= Descendants of Henry II of France =

Henry II of France and Catherine de' Medici were married on 28 October 1533, and their marriage produced ten children. Henry and Catherine became the ancestors of monarchs of several countries.

== Background, pedigree and family ties ==
Both Henry and Catherine were from distinguished families and had notable people in their respective family trees.

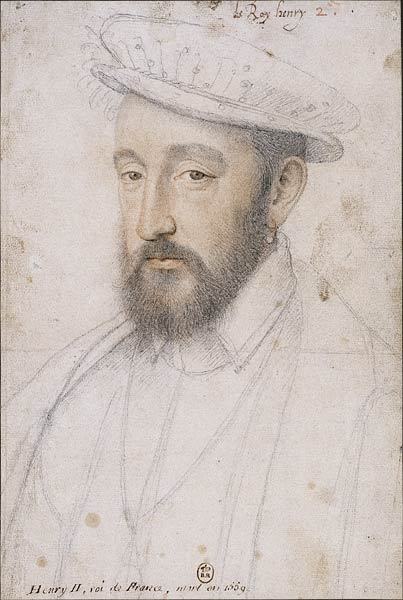
Henry II of France

=== Henry II of France ===
Henry's father was Francis I of France, the patron of Leonardo da Vinci and a member of the Valois-Angoulême branch of the House of Valois. His maternal grandfather was Louis XII of France, the conqueror of the Neapolitan Kingdom of Naples and the Duchy of Milan. Both Kings of France were descendants (in the male line) of Charles V, King of France, and as such represented, as the only extant line of the House of Valois, the descent of Charles, Count of Valois, fourth son of King Philip III of France, from the House of Capet.

Henry's maternal grandmother was Anne of Brittany, the defiant Duchess Regent of Brittany and Queen of France twice over. Her grandmother was Eleanor of Navarre, the daughter of John II of Aragon and half-sister of Ferdinand II of Aragon. Therefore, this made Henry a distant half-cousin of his son-in-law Philip II of Spain. This also made him a second cousin once-removed of his other son-in-law, Henry IV of France, who was also a distant cousin through their common male-line ancestor, St. Louis of France.

Catherine de' Medici

=== Catherine de' Medici ===
Catherine's father and grandfather were Lorenzo II de' Medici, Duke of Urbino and Piero the Unfortunate, respectively. The latter was a son of Lorenzo il Magnifico, the great Renaissance ruler of Florence. This made Catherine a scion of the illustrious House of Medici. Also her guardian till her marriage was Pope Clement VII, formerly Giulio De'Medici, illegitimate son of Giuliano De'Medici, brother of Lorenzo il Magnifico. Therefore, from her father's side, Catherine had high Italian ancestry.

Her mother was from the House of La Tour d'Auvergne, her father being the last Count of Boulogne from the aforementioned House. Her maternal grandmother Jeanne de Bourbon-Vendôme was a direct patrilineal descendant of Louis, the first duke of Bourbon. This made Catherine a direct descendant of Louis IX of France, and of the House of Capet, albeit through a female line. Also this made her a 7th cousin, once removed of her husband Henry and a 6th cousin, 3 times removed of Henri of Navarre, her son-in-law.

Ultimately both Henry and Medici, through Louis IX and the House of Capet, descended from Hugues Capet, the King of the Franks.

== Children ==
During their marriage, the royal couple faced health problems with their children: their fourth child, Louis, died when he was a baby and Catherine almost died giving birth to her youngest children, twins, Jeanne and Victoire. After their birth, the doctors told Henry and Catherine that their marriage should not produce more children.

The following table lists all the children of Henry and Catherine.

Name	Portrait	Birth	Death	Marriages and Issue/Notes
Francis II, King of France		19 January 1544	5 December 1560	Married Mary, Queen of Scots (1542–1587) on 24 April 1558. No issue.
Elizabeth of France		2 April 1545	3 October 1568	Married Philip II, King of Spain (1527–1598) on 22 June 1559. They had six children but only two daughters survived.
Claude of France		12 November 1547	21 February 1575	Married Charles III, Duke of Lorraine (1543–1608) on 19 January 1559. They had nine children.
Louis, Duke of Orléans		3 February 1549	24 October 1550	Died young; no issue.
Charles IX, King of France		27 June 1550	30 May 1574	Married Elizabeth of Austria (1554–1592) on 26 November 1570. Had one legitimate daughter (the only Valois grandchild of his parents) who died young.
Henry III, King of France		19 September 1551	2 August 1589	Married Louise of Lorraine on 15 February 1575. Had no issue. Briefly King of Poland in 1574.
Margaret of France		14 May 1553	27 March 1615	Known as "Queen Margot". Married Henry IV, King of France on 18 August 1572 and divorced on 17 December 1599. No issue.
Hercules, Duke of Anjou		18 March 1555	19 June 1584	Later known as Francis, Duke of Alençon and Anjou. No issue.
Victoire of France		24 June 1556	17 August 1556	Died young
Jeanne of France		24 June 1556	24 June 1556	Stillborn

== Descendants of Elizabeth of Valois ==
=== Progeny of Isabella Clara Eugenia of Spain ===
Name of Descendant	Portrait	Birth	Marriages and Issue	Death	Miscellaneous
Infanta Isabella Clara Eugenia of Spain		12 August 1566, Daughter of Elisabeth of Valois and Philip II of Spain	Albert VII, Archduke of Austria; No surviving Issue	1 December 1633	co-sovereigns of the Spanish Netherlands

=== Progeny of Catherine Michaela of Spain ===
Name of Descendant	Portrait	Birth	Marriages and Issue	Death	Miscellaneous
Catherine Michaela of Spain		10 October 1567, Daughter of Elisabeth of Valois and Philip II of Spain	Charles Emmanuel I, Duke of Savoy; 10 children	6 November 1597	
Philip Emmanuel, Prince of Piedmont		2 April 1586, Son of Charles Emmanuel I, Duke of Savoy and Catherine Michaela of Spain	Unmarried, No issue	9 February 1605	
Isabella of Savoy		11 March 1591, Daughter of Charles Emmanuel I, Duke of Savoy and Catherine Michaela of Spain	Alfonso III d'Este; 14 children	28 August 1626	
Francesco I d'Este		6 September 1610, Son of Alfonso III d'Este and Isabella of Savoy	Maria Caterina Farnese Vittoria FarneseLucrezia Barberini 6 children	14 October 1658	
Alfonso IV d'Este, Duke of Modena and Reggio		2 February 1634, Son of Francesco I d'Este and Maria Caterina Farnese	Laura Martinozzi 2 children	16 July 1662	
Isabella d'Este, Duchess of Parma		3 October 1635, Daughter of Francesco I d'Este and Maria Caterina Farnese	Ranuccio II Farnese, Duke of Parma 3 children	21 August 1666	
Eleonora d'Este		2 January 1643, Daughter of Francesco I d'Este and Maria Caterina Farnese	Became a Carmelite nun; No issue	24 February 1722	
Maria d'Este, Duchess of Parma and Piacenza		8 December 1644, Daughter of Francesco I d'Este and Maria Caterina Farnese	Ranuccio II Farnese, Duke of Parma 7 children	20 August 1684	
Rinaldo d'Este, Duke of Modena and Reggio		26 April 1655, Son of Francesco I d'Este and Lucrezia Barberini	Charlotte of Brunswick-Lüneburg 8 children	26 October 1737	
Victor Amadeus I, Duke of Savoy		8 May 1587, Son of Charles Emmanuel I, Duke of Savoy and Catherine Michaela of Spain	Christine Marie of France; 8 children	7 October 1637	
Princess Luisa Cristina of Savoy		27 July 1629, Daughter of Victor Amadeus I, Duke of Savoy and Christine Marie of France	Prince Maurice of Savoy No issue	12 May 1692	Her husband was her uncle, he was her fathers younger brother
Charles Emmanuel II, Duke of Savoy		20 June 1634, Son of Victor Amadeus I, Duke of Savoy and Christine Marie of France	Françoise Madeleine d'Orléans No issue Marie Jeanne of Savoy; 1 child	12 June 1675	
Victor Amadeus II of Sardinia		14 May 1666, Son of Charles Emmanuel II, Duke of Savoy and Marie Jeanne of Savoy	Anne Marie d'Orléans; Anna Teresa Canalis di Cumiana; 8 children	31 October 1732	
Maria Vittoria of Savoy, Princess of Carignano		9 February 1690, illegitimate Daughter of Victor Amadeus II of Sardinia and Jeanne Baptiste d'Albert de Luynes	Victor Amadeus I, Prince of Carignan 5 children	8 July 1766	
Vittorio Francesco, Marquis of Susa		10 December 1694, illegitimate Son of Victor Amadeus II of Sardinia and Jeanne Baptiste d'Albert de Luynes	Maria Lucrezia Franchi No issue	20 March 1762	
Princess Henriette Adelaide of Savoy		6 November 1636, Daughter of Victor Amadeus I, Duke of Savoy and Christine Marie of France	Ferdinand Maria, Elector of Bavaria; 4 children	18 March 1676	
Duchess Maria Anna Victoria of Bavaria		28 November 1660, Daughter of Princess Henriette Adelaide of Savoy and Ferdinand Maria, Elector of Bavaria	Louis, Dauphin of France; 3 children	20 April 1690	
Maximilian II Emanuel, Elector of Bavaria		11 July 1662, Son of Princess Henriette Adelaide of Savoy and Ferdinand Maria, Elector of Bavaria	Maria Antonia of Austria; Theresa Kunegunda Sobieska; 5 children	26 February 1726	
Emmanuel Philibert of Savoy, Viceroy of Sicily		16 April 1588, Son of Catherine Michaela of Spain and Charles Emmanuel I, Duke of Savoy	Unmarried, No issue	4 August 1624	
Margaret of Savoy, Vicereine of Portugal		28 April 1589, Daughter of Catherine Michaela of Spain and Charles Emmanuel I, Duke of Savoy	Francesco IV Gonzaga, Duke of Mantua; 1 child	26 June 1655	
Maria Gonzaga, Duchess of Montferrat		29 July 1609, Daughter of Margaret of Savoy, Vicereine of Portugal and Francesco IV Gonzaga, Duke of Mantua	Charles II Gonzaga; 2 children	14 August 1660	
Charles II Gonzaga, Duke of Mantua and Montferrat		31 October 1629, Son of Charles II Gonzaga and Maria Gonzaga, Duchess of Montferrat	Archduchess Isabella Clara of Austria 1 child	30 August 1631	
Ferdinando Carlo Gonzaga, Duke of Mantua and Montferrat		14 August 1665, Son of Charles II Gonzaga, Duke of Mantua and Montferrat and Archduchess Isabella Clara of Austria	Anna Isabella Gonzaga Suzanne Henriette of Lorraine No issue	5 July 1708	
Eleanor Gonzaga		18 November 1630, Daughter Maria Gonzaga, Duchess of Montferrat and Charles II Gonzaga	Ferdinand III, Holy Roman Emperor; 2 children	6 December 1686	
Eleonora Maria of Austria, Queen of Poland, Duchess of Lorraine		31 May 1653, Daughter of Eleanor Gonzaga and Ferdinand III, Holy Roman Emperor	Michał Korybut Wiśniowiecki, King of Poland and Grand Duke of Lithuania; Charles V, Duke of Lorraine; 2 children	17 Dec 1697	Husband = Charles V, Duke of Lorraine under Progeny of Henry II, Duke of Lorraine
Leopold the Good, Duke of Lorraine		11 September 1679, Son of Charles V, Duke of Lorraine and Eleonora Maria of Austria	Élisabeth Charlotte d'Orléans 14 children	27 March 1729	
Charles Joseph of Lorraine, Bishop of Olomouc		24 November 1680, Son of Charles V, Duke of Lorraine and Eleonora Maria of Austria	No issue	4 December 1715	
Archduchess Maria Anna Josepha of Austria		20 December 1654, Daughter of Eleanor Gonzaga and Ferdinand III, Holy Roman Emperor	Johann Wilhelm, Elector Palatine 2 children, both died in infancy	4 April 1689	
Prince Maurice of Savoy		Son of Catherine Michaela of Spain and Charles Emmanuel I, Duke of Savoy	Princess Luisa Cristina of Savoy No issue	3 October 1657	His wife was his niece, the daughter of his brother Victor Amadeus I, Duke of Savoy and Christine of France
Thomas Francis, Prince of Carignano		21 December 1596, Son of Catherine Michaela of Spain and Charles Emmanuel I, Duke of Savoy	Marie de Bourbon, Countess of Soissons; 7 children	22 January 1656	
Princess Louise of Savoy		1 August 1627, Daughter of Thomas Francis, Prince of Carignano and Marie de Bourbon, Countess of Soissons	Ferdinand Maximilian, Hereditary Prince of Baden-Baden 1 child	7 July 1689	
Emmanuel Philibert, Prince of Carignano		20 August 1628, Son of Thomas Francis, Prince of Carignano and Marie de Bourbon, Countess of Soissons	Maria Angela Caterina d'Este 4 children	23 April 1709	
Eugene Maurice, Count of Soissons		2 March 1635, Son of Thomas Francis, Prince of Carignano and Marie de Bourbon, Countess of Soissons	Olimpia Mancini 8 children	6 June 1673	

== Descendants of Claude of Valois ==
=== Progeny of Henry II, Duke of Lorraine ===
Name	Portrait	Birth and Parents	Marriages and Issue	Death	Miscellaneous
Henry II, Duke of Lorraine		8 November 1563, Claude of Valois and Charles III, Duke of Lorraine	Catherine of Navarre, Duchess of Lorraine; Margerita Gonzaga; 2 children	31 July 1621	
Nicolette of Lorraine		3 October 1608, Daughter of Henry II, Duke of Lorraine and Margerita Gonzaga	Charles IV, Duke of Lorraine; No Issue	2 February 1657	
Claude-Françoise of Lorraine		6 October 1612, Daughter of Henry II, Duke of Lorraine and Margerita Gonzaga	Nicholas II, Duke of Lorraine; 5 children	2 August 1648	
Charles V, Duke of Lorraine		3 April 1643, Son of Nicholas II, Duke of Lorraine and Claude-Françoise of Lorraine	Eleonore Maria of Austria 2 children		His wife = the Elenore under Progeny of Catherine Michaela of Spain
Anne-Marie-Thérèse of Lorraine		30 July 1648, Daughter of Nicholas II, Duke of Lorraine and Claude-Françoise of Lorraine	Became a nun; No issue	17 June 1661	

=== Progeny of Christine of Lorraine ===
Name of Descendant	Portrait	Birth	Marriages and Issue	Death	Miscellaneous
Christina of Lorraine		16 August 1565, Daughter of Claude of Valois and Charles III, Duke of Lorraine	Ferdinando I de' Medici, Grand Duke of Tuscany; 5 children	19 December 1637	
Cosimo II de' Medici, Grand Duke of Tuscany		12 May 1590, Son of Ferdinando I de' Medici and Christina of Lorraine	Maria Maddalena of Austria; 8 children	28 February 1621	
Ferdinando II de' Medici, Grand Duke of Tuscany		14 July 1610, Son of Cosimo II de' Medici, Grand Duke of Tuscany and Maria Maddalena of Austria	Vittoria della Rovere; 2 children	23 May 1670	
Cardinal Giancarlo de' Medici		24 July 1611, Son of Cosimo II de' Medici, Grand Duke of Tuscany and Maria Maddalena of Austria	Unmarried; No issue	22 January 1663	
Margherita de' Medici		31 May 1612, Daughter of Cosimo II de' Medici, Grand Duke of Tuscany and Maria Maddalena of Austria	Odoardo Farnese, Duke of Parma; 5 children	6 February 1679	
Ranuccio II Farnese, Duke of Parma		17 September 1630, Son of Odoardo Farnese, Duke of Parma, and Margherita de' Medici	Marguerite Yolande of Savoy; Isabella d'Este; Maria d'Este; 3 children	11 December 1694	
Elisabeth of Parma		22 October 1692, Daughter of Odoardo II Farnese and Dorothea Sophie of the Palatinate-Neuburg; Granddaughter of Ranuccio II Farnese, Duke of Parma	Philip V of Spain; 7 children	11 July 1766	
Mattias de' Medici Governor of Siena		9 May 1613, Son of Cosimo II de' Medici, Grand Duke of Tuscany and Maria Maddalena of Austria	Unmarried; No issue	11 October 1667	
Francesco de' Medici		16 October 1614, Son of Cosimo II de' Medici, Grand Duke of Tuscany and Maria Maddalena of Austria	Unmarried; No issue	25 July 1634	
Anna de'Medici		21 July 1616, Daughter of Cosimo II de' Medici, Grand Duke of Tuscany and Maria Maddalena of Austria	Ferdinand Charles, Archduke of Further Austria; 1 child	11 September 1676	
Claudia Felicitas of Austria		30 May 1653, daughter of Archduke Ferdinand Charles of Austria and Anna de'Medici	Leopold I, Holy Roman Emperor; 2 children	8 April 1676	
Claudia de' Medici		4 June 1604, Daughter of Ferdinando I de' Medici, Grand Duke of Tuscany and Christina of Lorraine	Federico della Rovere; Leopold V, Archduke of Austria; 5 children	25 December 1648	
Vittoria della Rovere		7 February 1622, Daughter of Claudia de' Medici and Federico della Rovere	Ferdinando II de' Medici, Grand Duke of Tuscany; 2 children	5 March 1694	
Ferdinand Charles, Archduke of Further Austria		17 May 1628, Son of Claudia de' Medici and Leopold V, Archduke of Austria	Anna de'Medici; 1 child	30 December 1662	
Archduchess Isabella Clara of Austria		c. 1629, Daughter of Claudia de' Medici and Leopold V, Archduke of Austria	Charles III, Duke of Mantua; 1 child	c. 1685	
Ferdinand Charles, Duke of Mantua and Montferrat		31 August 1652, Son of Archduchess Isabella Clara of Austria and Charles III, Duke of Mantua	Anna Isabella Gonzaga; Susanne de Lorraine; No Issue	5 July 1708	
Sigismund Francis, Archduke of Further Austria		27 November 1630, Son of Claudia de' Medici and Leopold V, Archduke of Austria	Never married No Issue	25 June 1665	
Maria Leopoldine of Austria		6 April 1632, Daughter of Claudia de' Medici and Leopold V, Archduke of Austria	Ferdinand III, Holy Roman Emperor; 1 child	7 August 1649	
Cardinal Leopoldo de' Medici		6 November 1617, Son of Cosimo II de' Medici, Grand Duke of Tuscany and Maria Maddalena of Austria	Unmarried; No issue	10 November 1675	

=== Progeny of Francis II, Duke of Lorraine ===
Name of Descendant	Portrait	Birth and Parents	Marriages and Issue	Death	Miscellaneous
Francis II, Duke of Lorraine		27 February 1572, Claude of Valois and Charles III, Duke of Lorraine	Christina of Salm; 3 children	14 October 1632	
Charles IV, Duke of Lorraine		5 April 1604, Son of Claude of Valois and Charles III, Duke of Lorraine	Nicolette of Lorraine; Béatrice de Cusance; 3 children	18 September 1675	
Anne of Lorraine		c. 1639, Daughter of Charles IV, Duke of Lorraine and Béatrice de Cusance	François Marie, Prince of Lillebonne; 3 children	c. 1720	
Élisabeth Thérèse de Lorraine		5 April 1664, Daughter of Anne de Lorraine and François Marie, Prince of Lillebonne	Louis de Melun; 2 children	7 March 1748	
Anne Julie de Melun		c. 1698, Daughter of Élisabeth Thérèse de Lorraine and Louis de Melun	Jules, Prince of Soubise; 3 children	18 May 1724	
Charles, Prince of Soubise		16 July 1715, Son of Anne Julie de Melun and Jules, Prince of Soubise	Anne Marie Louise de La Tour d'Auvergne; Princess Anna Teresa of Savoy; Landgravine Anna Viktoria of Hesse-Rotenburg; 2 children	4 July 1787	
Charlotte de Rohan		7 October 1737, Daughter of Charles, Prince of Soubise and Anne Marie Louise de La Tour d'Auvergne	Louis Joseph, Prince of Condé; 2 children	4 March 1760	
Louis Henri, Prince of Condé		13 April 1756, Son of Charlotte de Rohan and Louis Joseph, Prince of Condé	Bathilde d'Orléans; 1 child	30 August 1830	
Victoire de Rohan		28 December 1743, Daughter of Charles, Prince of Soubise and Princess Anna Teresa of Savoy	Henri Louis, Prince of Guéméné; 3children	20 September 1807	
Nicholas II, Duke of Lorraine		12 December 1612, Son of Francis II, Duke of Lorraine and Christina Salm	Claude of Lorraine; 1 child	25 January 1670	
Charles V of Lorraine		3 April 1643, Son of Nicholas II, Duke of Lorraine and Claude of Lorraine	Eleonora Maria of Austria; 2 children	18 April 1690	
Leopold, Duke of Lorraine		11 September 1679, Son of Charles V of Lorraine and Eleonora Maria of Austria	Élisabeth Charlotte d'Orléans; 5 children	27 March 1729	
Francis I, Holy Roman Emperor		8 December 1708, Son of Leopold, Duke of Lorraine and Élisabeth Charlotte d'Orléans	Maria Theresa of Austria; 16 children	18 August 1765	
Marguerite of Lorraine		22 July 1615, Francis II, Duke of Lorraine and Countess Christine of Salm	Gaston, Duke of Orléans; 5 children	13 April 1672	
Marguerite Louise d'Orléans		28 July 1645, Daughter of Gaston de France, Duke of Orléans and Marguerite of Lorraine	Cosimo III de' Medici, Grand Duke of Tuscany; 3 children	17 September 1721	
Élisabeth Marguerite d'Orléans		26 December 1646, Daughter of Gaston de France, Duke of Orléans and Marguerite of Lorraine	Louis Joseph, Duke of Guise; 1 child	17 March 1696	
Françoise Madeleine d'Orléans		13 October 1648, Daughter of Gaston de France, Duke of Orléans and Marguerite of Lorraine	Charles Emmanuel II, Duke of Savoy; No Issue	14 January 1664	

== Descendants of Charles IX ==
Name	Portrait	Birth and parents	Death	Marriages and issue/notes
Marie Elisabeth of Valois		27 October 1572; Elisabeth of Austria; Charles IX of France	9 April 1578	Died young; no issue

== See also ==
- Descendants of Louis XIV of France
- Descendants of Philippe I, Duke of Orléans
- Descendants of Philip V of Spain
- Descendants of Charles III of Spain
- Descendants of Charles I of England
