= Margherita Gonzaga, Duchess of Lorraine =

Margherita Gonzaga
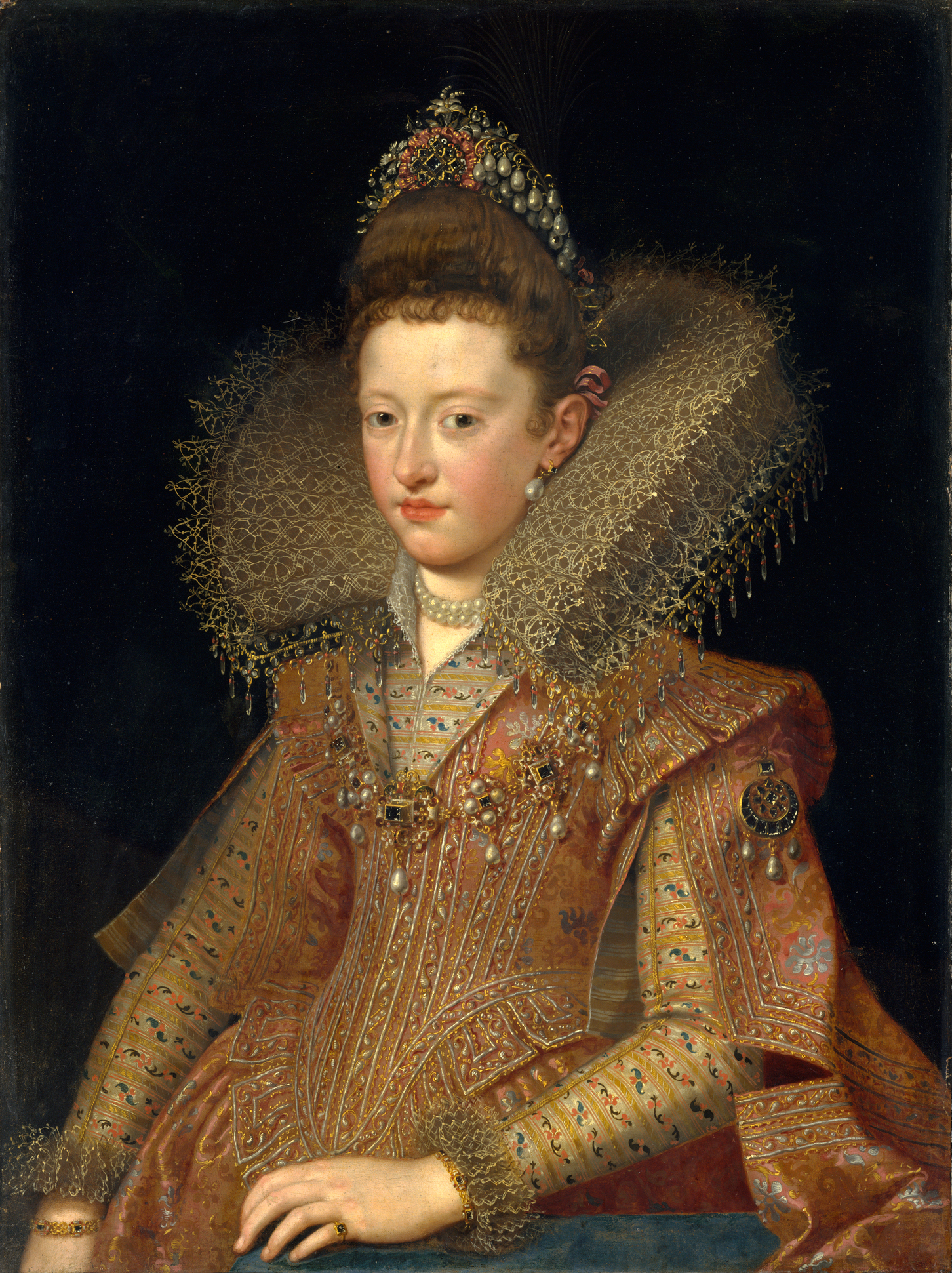
- Portrait by Frans Pourbus the younger, 1606. Metropolitan Museum of Art, New York City.

Duchess consort of Lorraine
- Tenure: 14 May 1608 – 31 July 1624
- Born: 2 October 1591; Mantua
- Died: 7 February 1632 (aged 40); Nancy
- Spouse: Henry II, Duke of Lorraine (m. 1606; died 1624)
- Issue: Nicole, Duchess of Lorraine; Claude, Duchess of Lorraine
- House: Gonzaga
- Father: Vincenzo Gonzaga, Duke of Mantua
- Mother: Eleonora de' Medici

Margherita Gonzaga (2 October 1591 – 7 February 1632) was Duchess of Lorraine from 1606 until 1624 by marriage to Henry II, Duke of Lorraine. She was an agent of Pro-French and anti-Protestant policy in Lorraine, and is most known for her support of her daughter Nicole's right to the Duchy of Lorraine. She also claimed her right to the Duchy of Montferrat during the Mantuan war of succession.

== Life ==
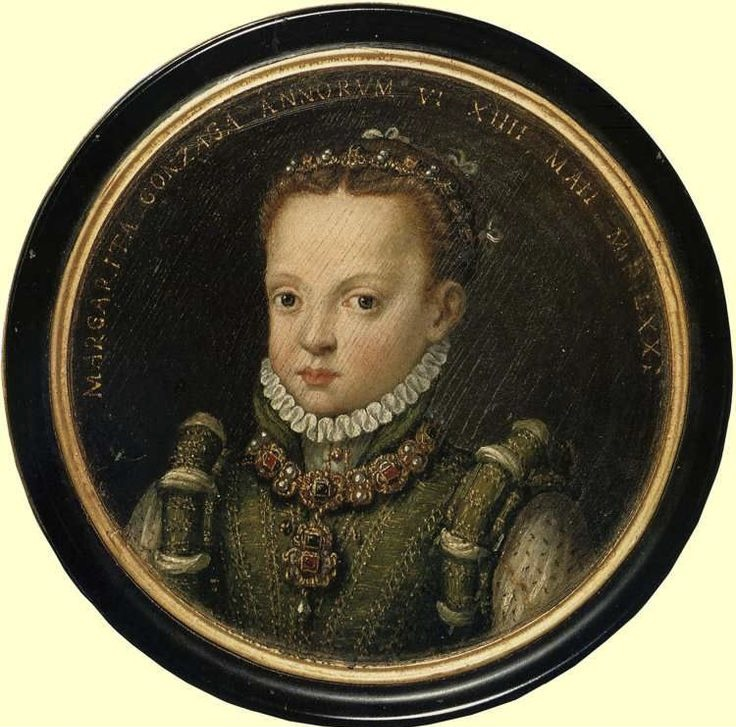
Miniature at age six by Sofonisba Anguissola (c. 1598)

She was born in Mantua, the eldest daughter of Vincenzo I Gonzaga and Eleonora de' Medici; she was also a sister of Francesco IV Gonzaga, Ferdinando I Gonzaga, Vincenzo II Gonzaga and Eleonora Gonzaga. Her brothers all succeeded their father as Duke of Mantua and Eleonora became Holy Roman Empress by her marriage to Ferdinand II, Holy Roman Emperor.

=== Marriage ===
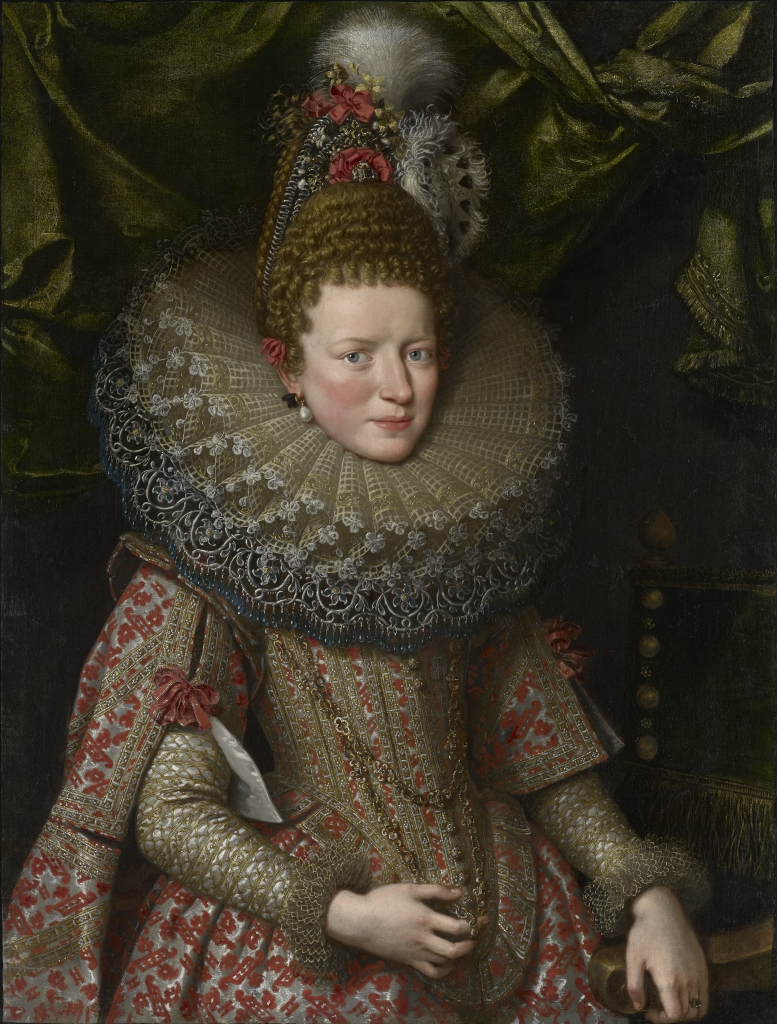
Portrait by Frans Pourbus the Younger (c. 1606)

She married Henry II, Duke of Lorraine on 24 April 1606. He had previously been married to Catherine of Navarre, sister of King Henry IV of France, but the marriage was childless (Catherine was forty years old at the time of her marriage).

A marriage between Henry II and Margherita Gonzaga, her being the niece of the new Queen of France (Marie de' Medici), would ally the Lorraine not only with the House of Gonzaga but also work as a proxy alliance between Lorraine and France, and that is how it was perceived at the French royal court as well. In September 1605, Henry IV of France and Vincenzo I Gonzaga agreed to make a mutual alliance with Lorraine through Margherita, and in February 1606 the marriage contract was signed in Paris by the agents of the bride and groom. A wedding by proxy took place in Mantova in April 1606, followed by the wedding in Nancy in June.

=== Duchess of Lorraine ===
In May 1608 Henry II succeeded his father as Duke of Lorraine and Margherita Gonzaga became Duchess. She was described as unattractive with a heavy chin and a big nose and was said to look older than her years, but also as strong and healthy. She was a spendthrift who loved luxury and reportedly loved to give expensive gifts, bought twelve shoes every month and continued to expand her stable with new horses; she was an enthusiastic hostess who preferred to stay in the Ducal Palace of Nancy, where she often arranged balls.

Margherita Gonzaga did have some political influence. Described as a Catholic fanatic, she supported Henry's persecution of the huguenots in Lorraine, and supported his decree in which all Protestants were ordered to leave Lorraine before 20 April 1617. She supported a Pro-French policy and successfully prevented the marriage of her daughter to a Spanish prince and instead supported (this time unsuccessful) her marriage to the French Dauphin.

In the absence of a son, Margherita and Henry attempted to secure the inheritance of Lorraine and Bar for their eldest daughter Nicole. They arranged a marriage between Nicole and Louis de Guise, son of Cardinal Louis II of Lorraine. However, Henry II's younger brother (Francois de Guise, comte de Vaudemont) refused Nicole's right by claiming that the Salic law applied in Lorraine, a conflict which was not settled until Nicole was married to Francois de Guise's son Charles.

=== Later life ===
On 13 July 1624, Henry died and was succeeded by his daughter Nicole with the support of Margherita Gonzaga. In 1625, Nicole's rights were challenged by her father-in-law Francois de Guise and her husband. Margherita Gonzaga travelled to the French royal court in Paris and successfully asked Louis XIII to send a French army to support her daughter’s right as duchess regnant of Lorraine. When Louis XIII sent an army under Louis de Marillac to the Duchy, however, Francois de Guise managed to win over the support of the Lorraine Estates, who were afraid of France, and be declared Francis II of Lorraine, deposing Nicole; he soon abdicated in favor of his son, who became Charles IV of Lorraine. After this event, France retracted their military support to Margherita Gonzaga and Nicole; Margherita Gonzaga made repeated attempts to secure French support for her daughter, but France was unwilling to engage further, although it did give Margherita support in words.

On 25 December 1627, Margherita's brother Vincenzo died, and a war broke out over the Mantuan succession. Margherita Gonzaga pressed her own right to Montferrat, which in contrast to Mantua allowed female succession; a theory is that she wanted to give her daughter Nicole a realm from her mother, since she had been deprived of her fathers realm. However, Margherita was not able to secure any support for her claim, particularly since her closest ally France supported Charles of Nevers. In the Regensburg Treaty of October 1630 she was given the right to compensation for having given up her claims (against her will).

In 1631, Margherita Gonzaga defended her daughter Nicole when her son-in-law tried to divorce Nicole with an annulment by accusing the vicar who performed their marriage ceremony, Melchior de La Vallee, of witchcraft.

== Issue ==
Henry and Margherita had four daughters, two of whom survived infancy:

- Stillborn daughter (February 1607);
- Nicole of Lorraine (3 October 1608 – 23 February 1657), married her cousin, Charles IV, Duke of Lorraine, separated in 1635;
- A daughter (10 February 1611 – 11 February 1611);
- Claude of Lorraine (15 October 1612 – 2 August 1648), married her cousin, Nicholas II, Duke of Lorraine

Both of Margherita's two daughters married their cousins, who were Henry's successors due to the fact that he and Margherita did not have a son to inherit his estates.

== Death ==
Margherita died in Nancy in 1632 at the age of forty. She had been a widow since 1624.

== Ancestry ==
Ancestors of Margherita Gonzaga, Duchess of Lorraine

16. Francesco II Gonzaga, Marquess of Mantua
8. Federico II, Duke of Mantua
17. Isabella d'Este
4. Guglielmo X Gonzaga, Duke of Mantua
18. William IX, Marquess of Montferrat
9. Margaret Palaeologina
19. Anne of Alençon
2. Vincenzo Gonzaga, Duke of Mantua
20. Philip I of Castile (= 28)
10. Ferdinand I, Holy Roman Emperor (= 14)
21. Joanna of Castile (= 29)
5. Archduchess Eleanor of Austria
22. Vladislas II of Hungary (= 30)
11. Anna of Bohemia and Hungary (= 15)
23. Anna of Foix-Candale (= 31)
1. Margherita Gonzaga
24. Giovanni dalle Bande Nere
12. Cosimo I de' Medici, Grand Duke of Tuscany
25. Maria Salviati
6. Francesco I de' Medici, Grand Duke of Tuscany
26. Pedro Álvarez de Toledo, 2nd Marquis of Villafranca
13. Eleanor of Toledo
27. Maria Osorio
3. Eleonora de' Medici
28. Philip I of Castile (=20)
14. Ferdinand I, Holy Roman Emperor (= 10)
29. Joanna of Castile (=21)
7. Archduchess Joanna of Austria
30. Vladislas II of Hungary (=22)
15. Anna of Bohemia and Hungary (= 11)
31. Anna of Foix-Candale (=23)

== Sources ==
- Parrott, David (1997). "The Mantuan Succession, 1627–31: A Sovereignty Dispute in Early Modern Europe". The English Historical Review. CXII (445, February). Oxford Academic: 20–65. doi:10.1093/ehr/CXII.445.20.
- Ward, Adolphus William; Prothero, G.W.; Leathes, Stanley, eds. (1911). The Cambridge Modern History. Vol. 13. The Macmillan Co.

Margherita Gonzaga, Duchess of Lorraine House of Gonzaga Born: 2 October 1591 Died: 7 February 1632
Royal titles
Vacant Title last held by Claude of France	Duchess consort of Lorraine; 1608–1624	Vacant Title next held by Christina of Salm
