= Claude, Duchess of Lorraine =

Claude, Duchess of Lorraine may refer to:

- Claude of France (1547–1575), Duchess of Lorraine, spouse of Charles III, Duke of Lorraine and daughter of Henry II of France
- Claude-Françoise of Lorraine (1612–1648), Duchess of Lorraine, spouse of Nicholas Francis, Duke of Lorraine
