= Claude of Lorraine =

Claude of Lorraine may refer to:

- Claude, Duke of Guise (1496–1550), called "Claude of Lorraine" prior to his creation as Duke of Guise in 1528
- Claude, Duke of Aumale (1526–1573), French nobleman and military commander
- Claude, Duke of Chevreuse (1578–1657), French nobleman
- Claude Lorrain (1600–1682), French artist
- Claude Françoise de Lorraine (1612–1648), Princess and Duchess of Lorraine
