= Frans Pourbus the Younger =

Flemish painter (1569–1622)

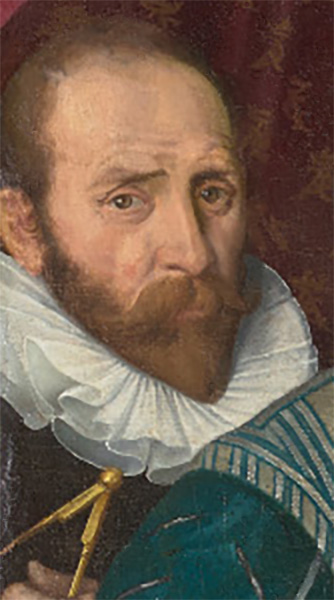
- Detail from Charles d'Arenberg and Anne de Croy with family, possibly a self-portrait of the painter
- Born: c. September–November 1569; Antwerp
- Died: before 19 February 1622 (aged 52); Paris
- Known for: Portrait painting
- Patrons: Archduke Albert and the Infanta Isabella; Vincenzo Gonzaga, Duke of Mantua; Marie de' Medici, Queen of France

Frans Pourbus the Younger or Frans Pourbus (II) (Antwerp, 1569 – Paris, 1622) was a Flemish painter, specialised in portrait painting. He was the third generation of a prominent family of religious and portrait painters.

Pourbus was a successful court painter for, successively, the Archdukes in Brussels, the Gonzaga Duke of Mantua (1600–1609), and then the French court. The majority of his work was royal portraits, many full-length, but he also painted some altarpieces. He painted the Brussels-based Spanish Regents of the Netherlands, the Duke of Mantua and Marie de' Medici, Queen of France.

Pourbus produced portraits that were pleasing to his patrons, but somewhat static with no dramatic situations, or landscape backgrounds. He is noted for his depiction of costume, jewellery and draperies, as in his portrait of Henry IV of France (below).

== Life ==
Frans was born in Antwerp as the son of Frans the Elder (1545 – 1581) and Suzanna Floris. Both his parents came from prominent artist families. His father was an important portrait and genre painter and his grandfather Pieter Pourbus (1523 – 1584) was the leading portrait and history painter in Bruges in the second half of the 16th century. His mother was a niece of his father's master, the Antwerp painter Frans Floris and daughter of Cornelis Floris de Vriendt, an influential sculptor and architect. He had two younger sisters. His mother died in 1674 after which his father remarried and had another son. His father died at the young age of 36 when Frans was only 12. There is no record of his artistic training, but he was likely an apprentice in his grandfather's workshop. He was admitted as a master in the Guild of St. Luke of Antwerp in the guild year 1591–92, when he was 22.

At the end of the 16th century, he worked for Archduke Albert and the Infanta Isabella in Brussels. On 27 June 1600, he was paid for a portrait of the Infanta. This work was subsequently presented to Anne of Denmark (wife of James VI and I) by the Ambassador of the Spanish Netherlands and remains in the Royal Collection until today.

In 1600, he was recruited as court painter in Mantua by Vincenzo Gonzaga, Duke of Mantua who met him when Gonzaga was on a visit to the Netherlands buying works of art. Within months of his appointment, Peter Paul Rubens arrived at the Mantuan court, but there is no evidence of hostility between the two. In 1609, Pourbus moved to Paris at the instigation of Marie de' Medici, Queen of France. It was here that he perfected his style. He worked as Marie de' Medici, Queen of France's court painter until his death.

== Death ==
He died in Paris and was buried on 19 February 1622.The exact date of his death is unknown.

== Work ==
Works of his can be found in the Royal Collection, the National Museum in Warsaw, the Louvre, the Prado, the Rijksmuseum, the Royal College of Art and the Metropolitan Museum of Art.

== Selected works ==
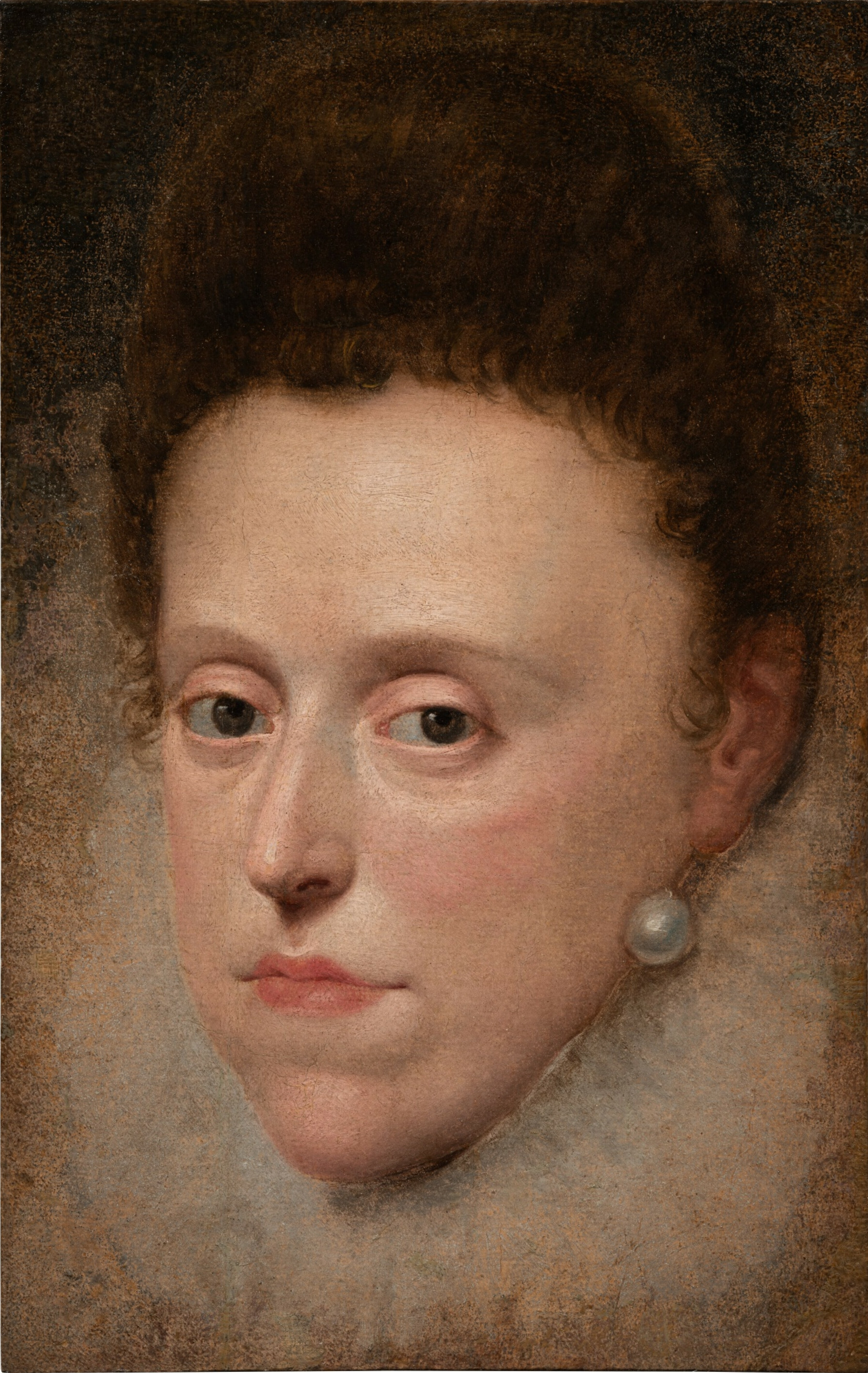
Portrait of Eleonora de' Medici Gonzaga, 1600–1602

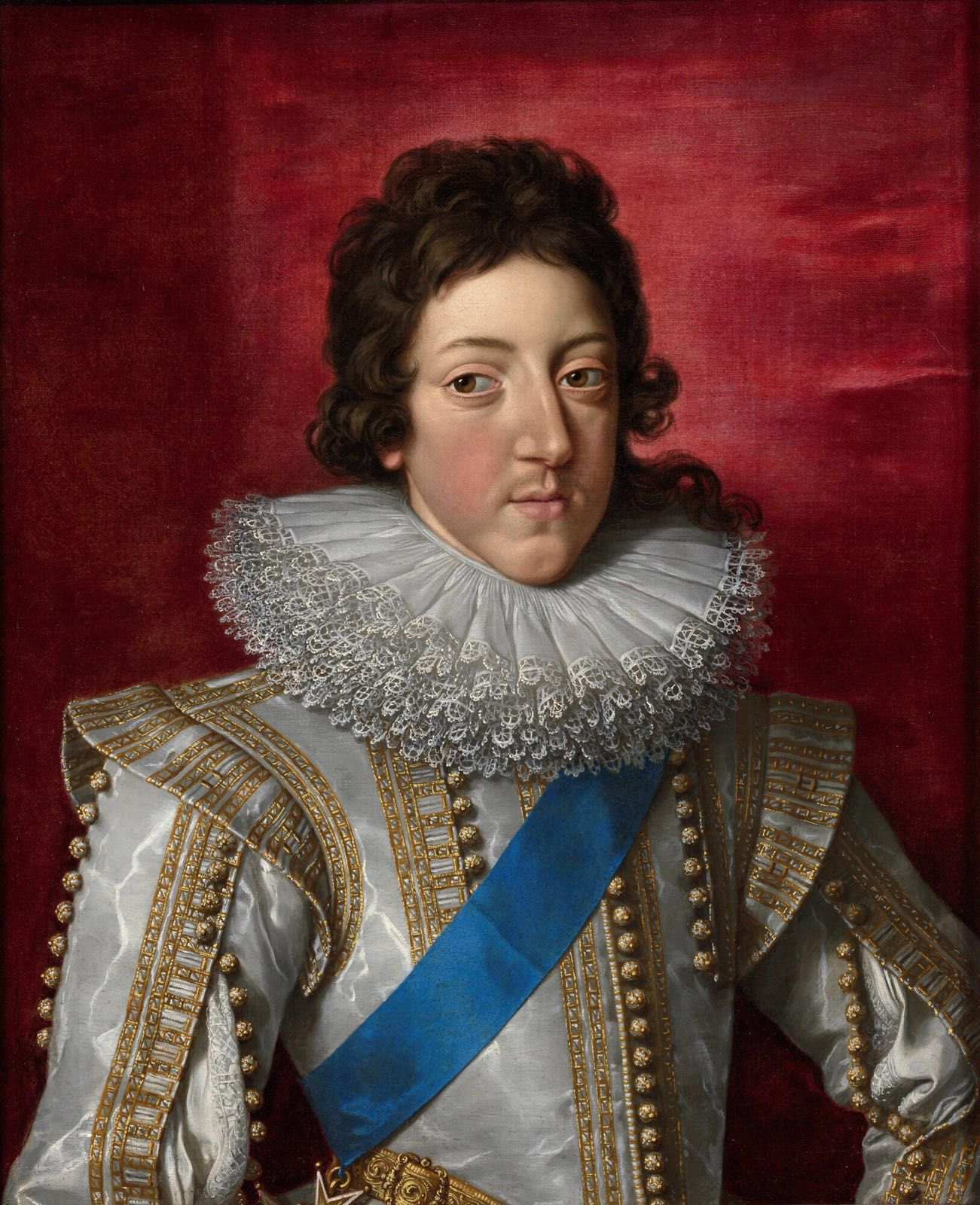
Louis XIII, King of France (with the Sash and Badge of the Order of Saint Esprit)

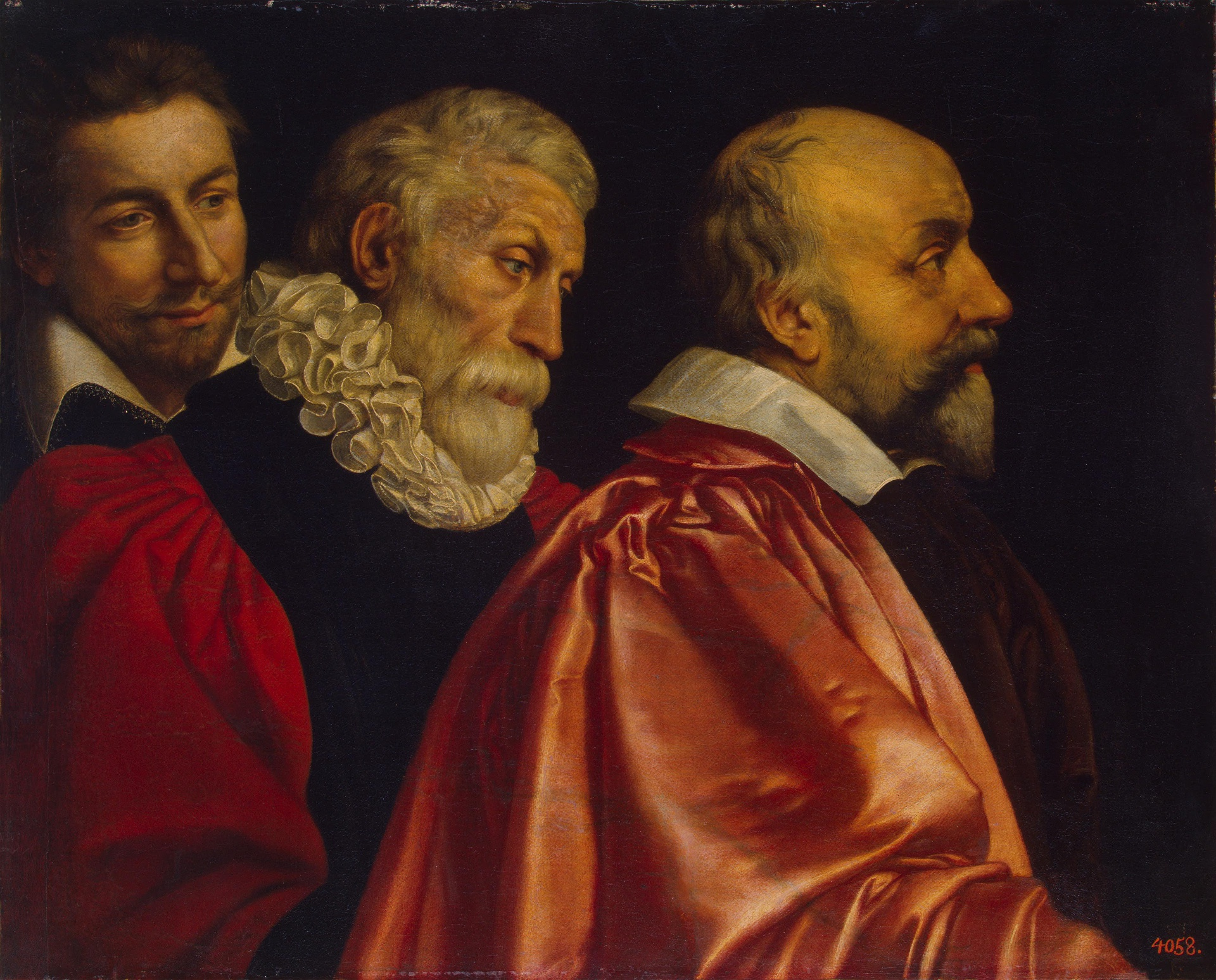
Councilors of Paris

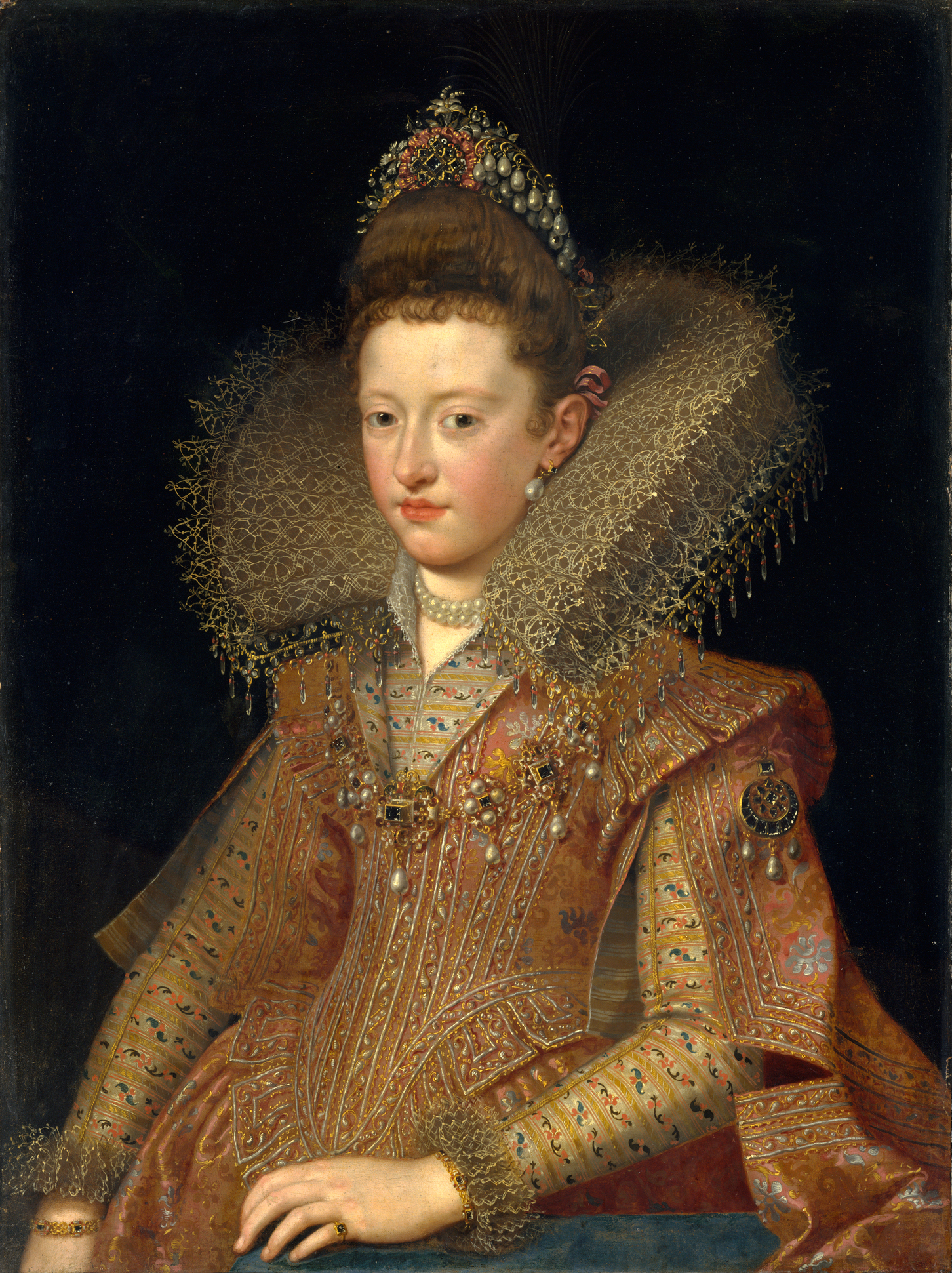
Margarita Gonzaga

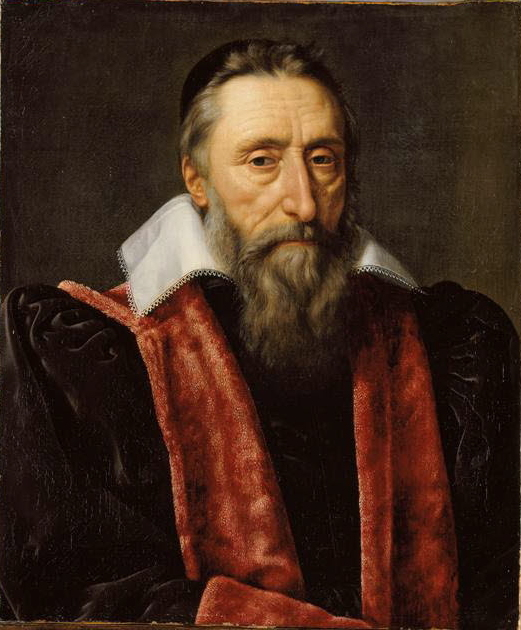
Portrait of Guillaume du Vair, Magistrate of the Parliament, Keeper of the Seals of France under Louis XIII

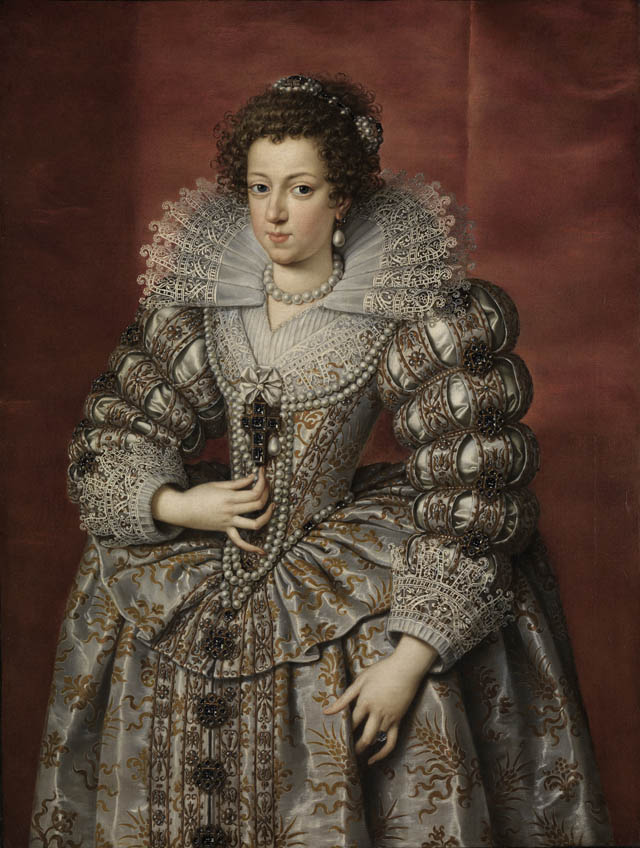
Anne of Austria

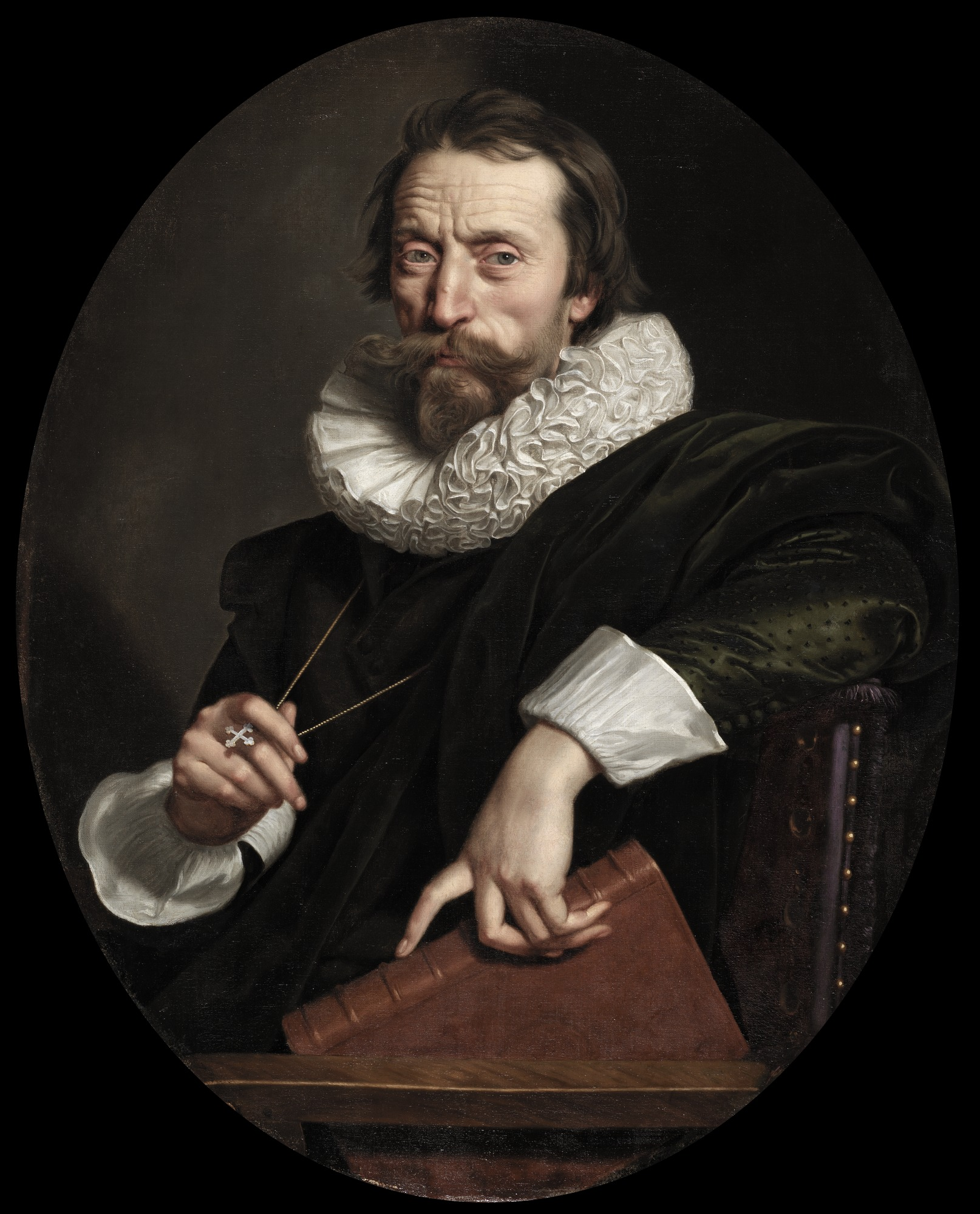
Portrait of the Italian poet Giambattista Marino

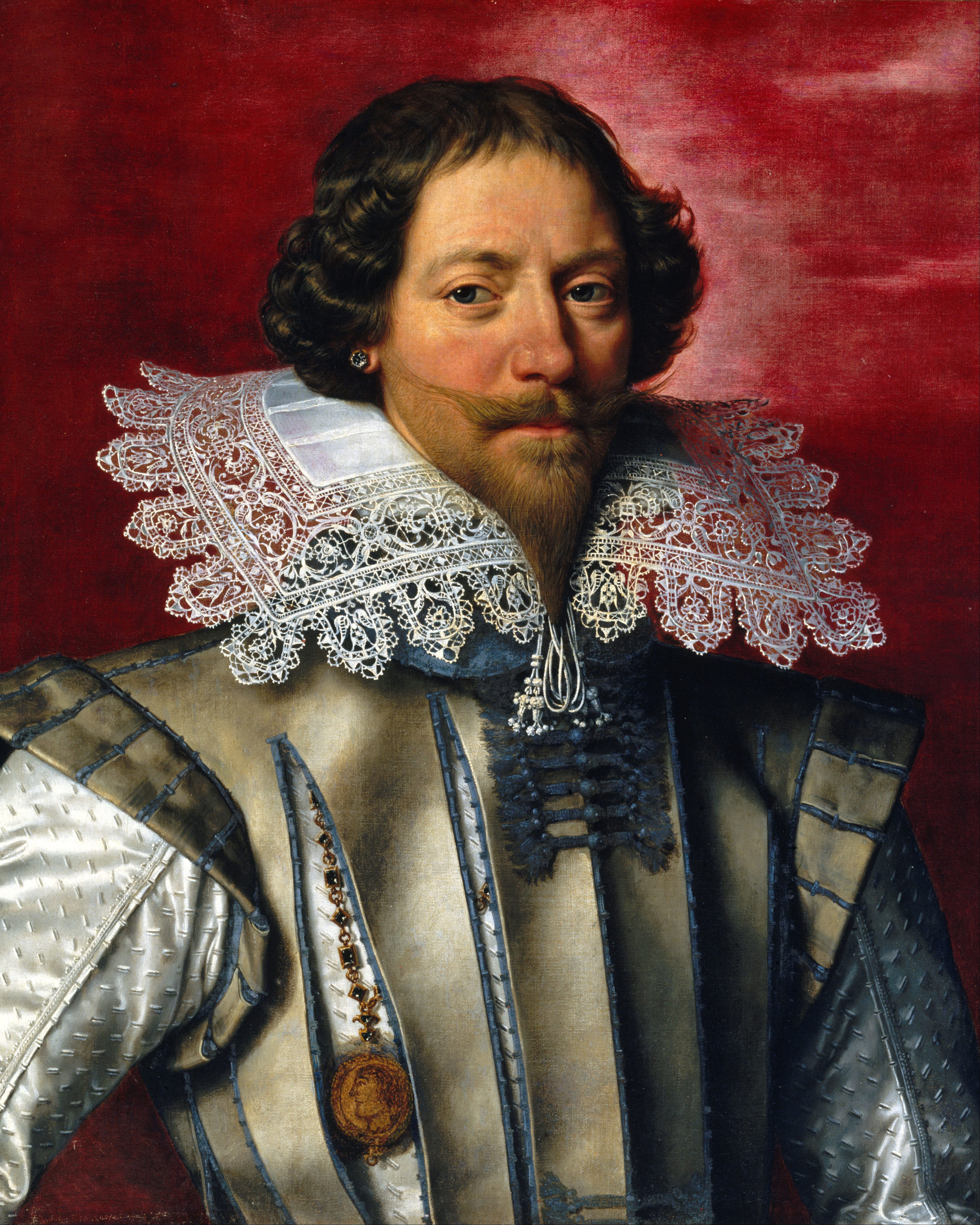
Portrait of a man

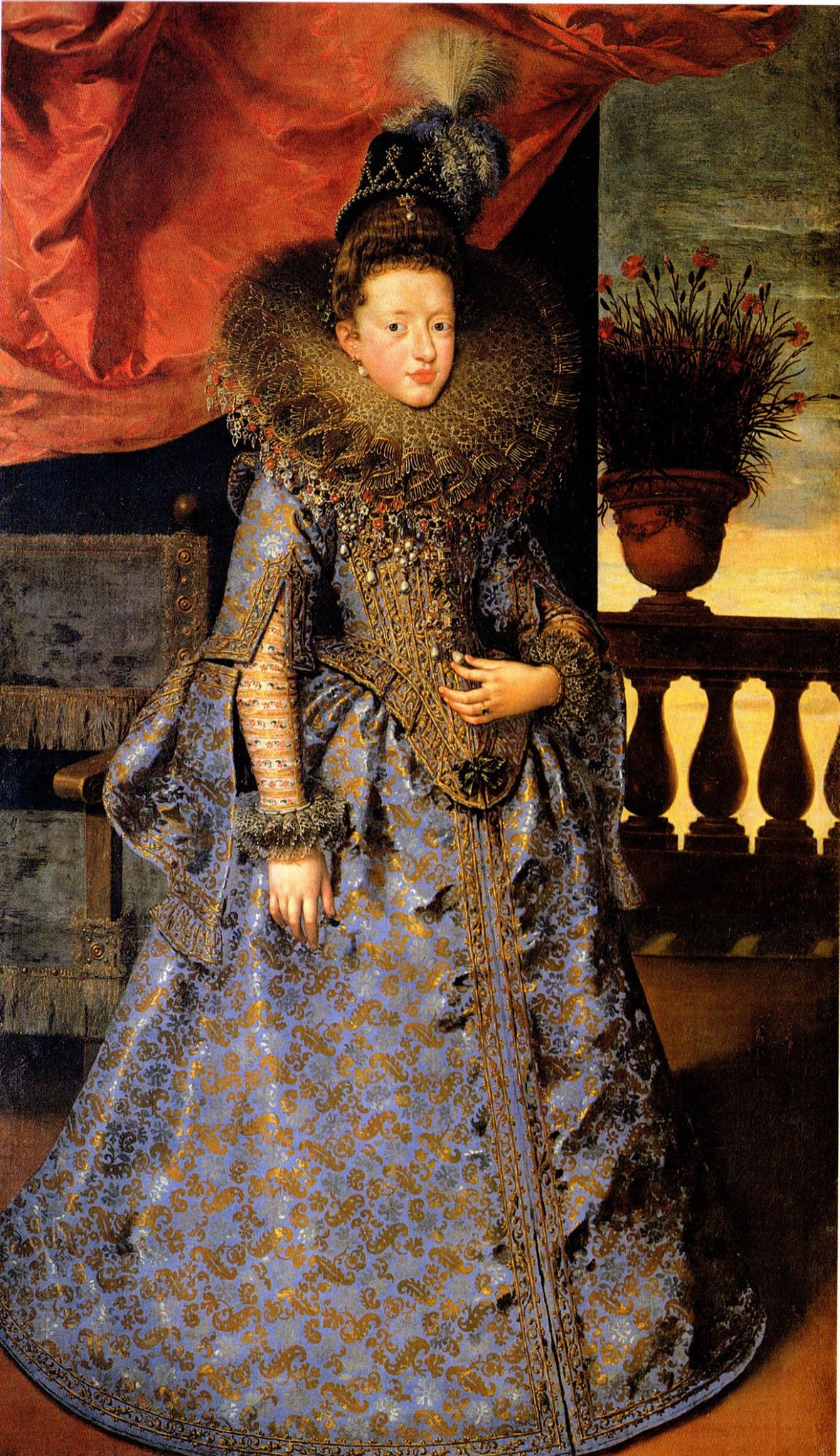
Portrait of Margherita Gonzaga

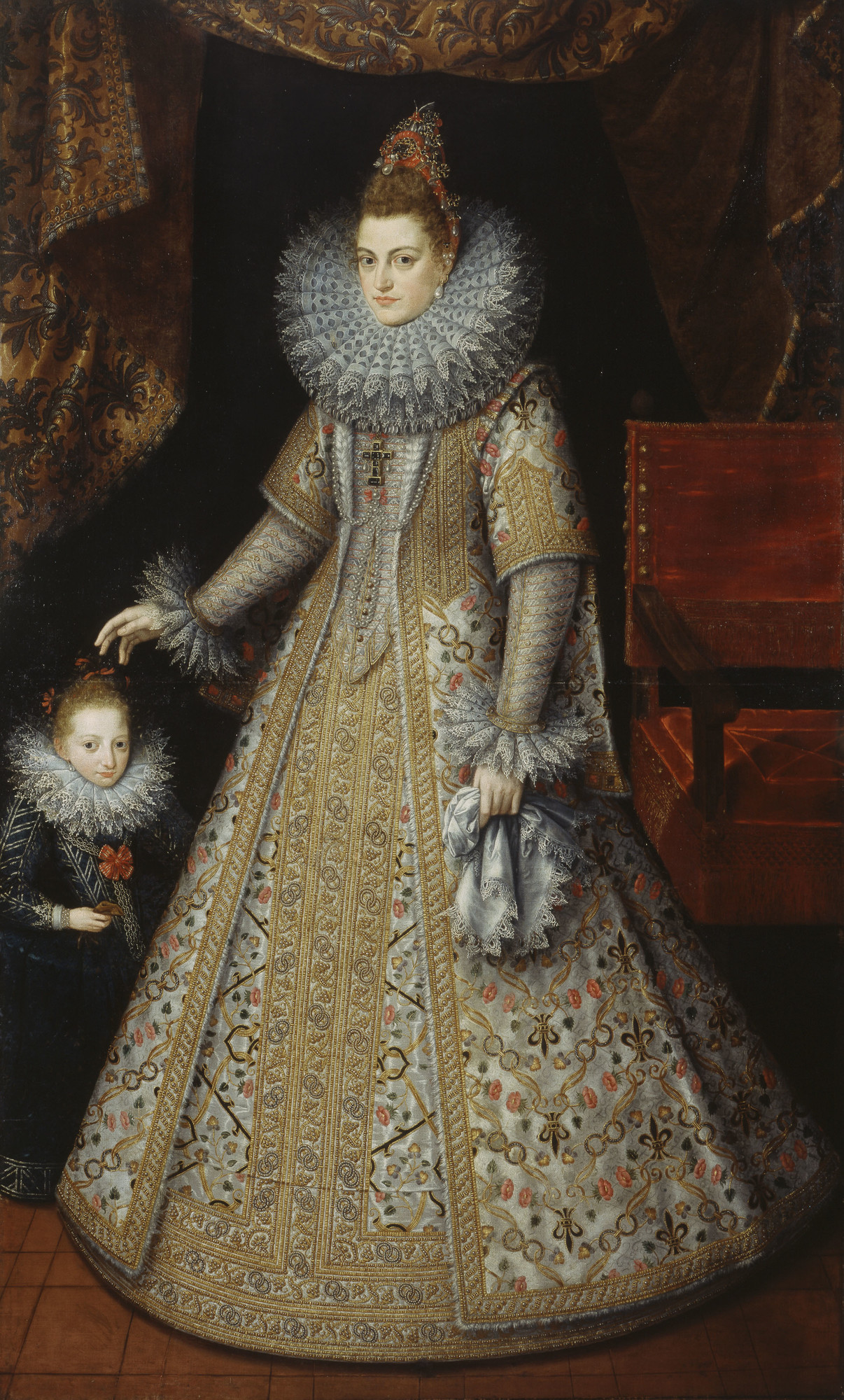
Infanta Isabella

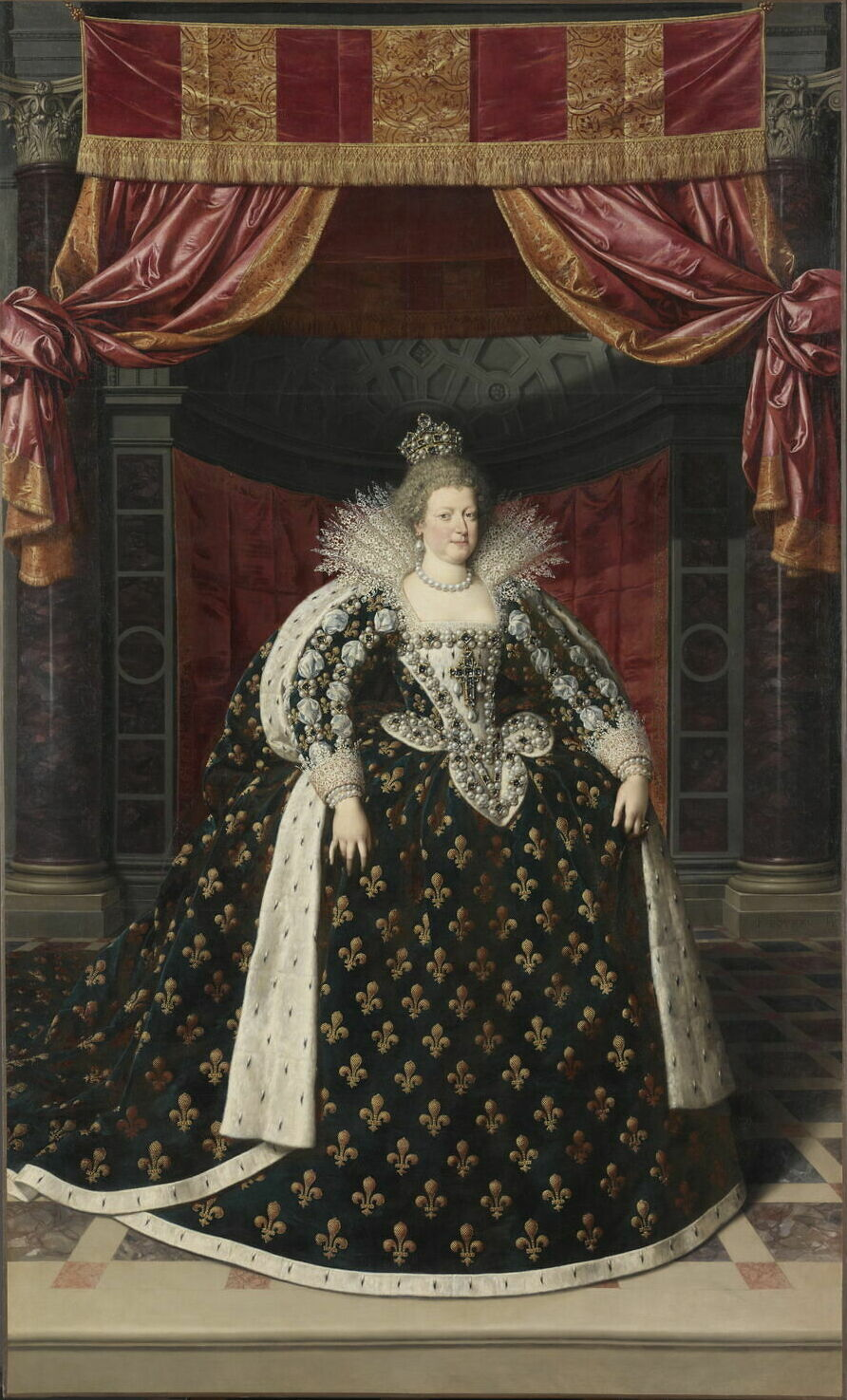
Marie de' Medici

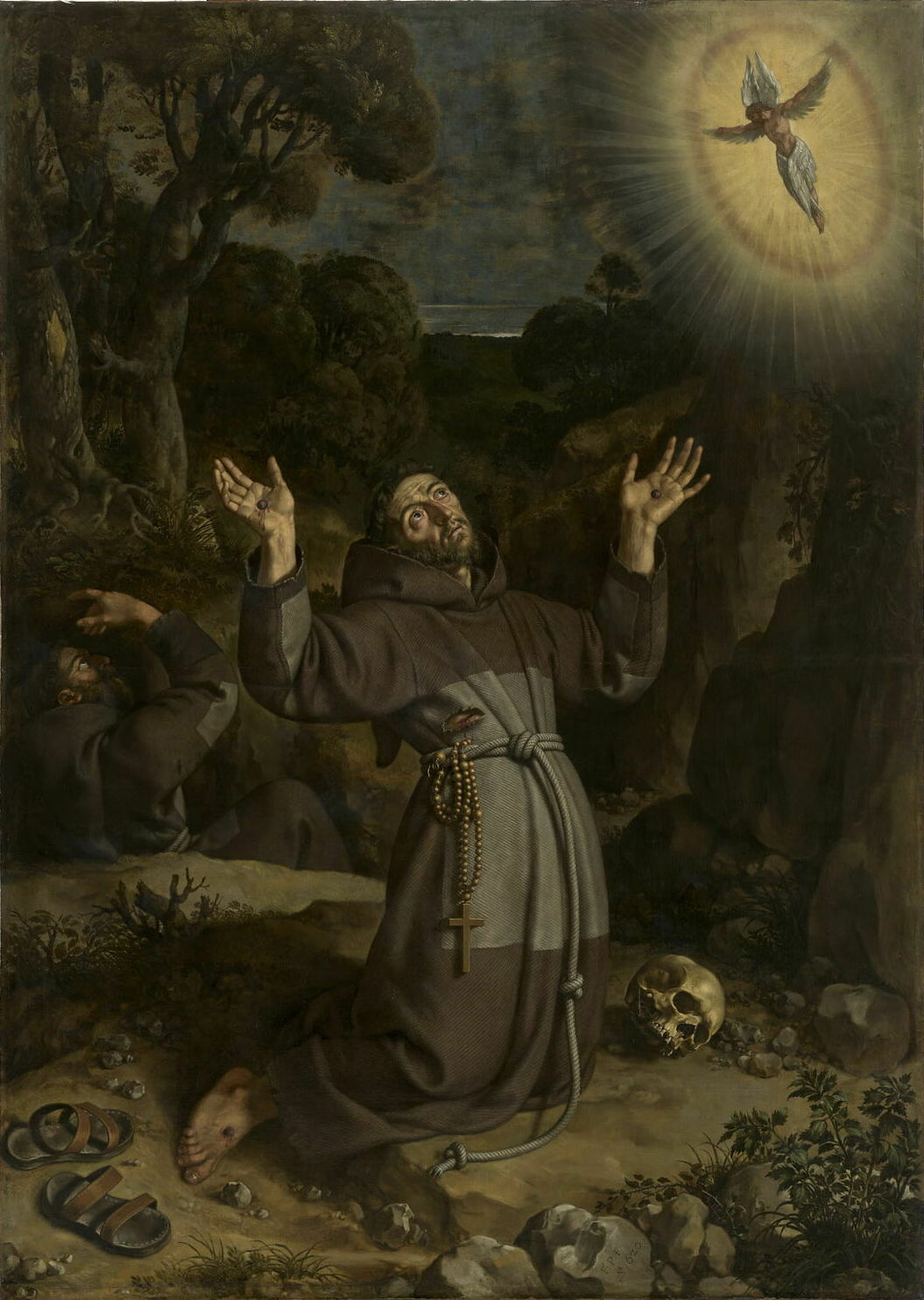
St Francis of Assisi receiving the stigmata
