= Francis II of Lorraine =

Duke of Lorraine and Bar in 1625

Francis II
- Count of Vaudémont
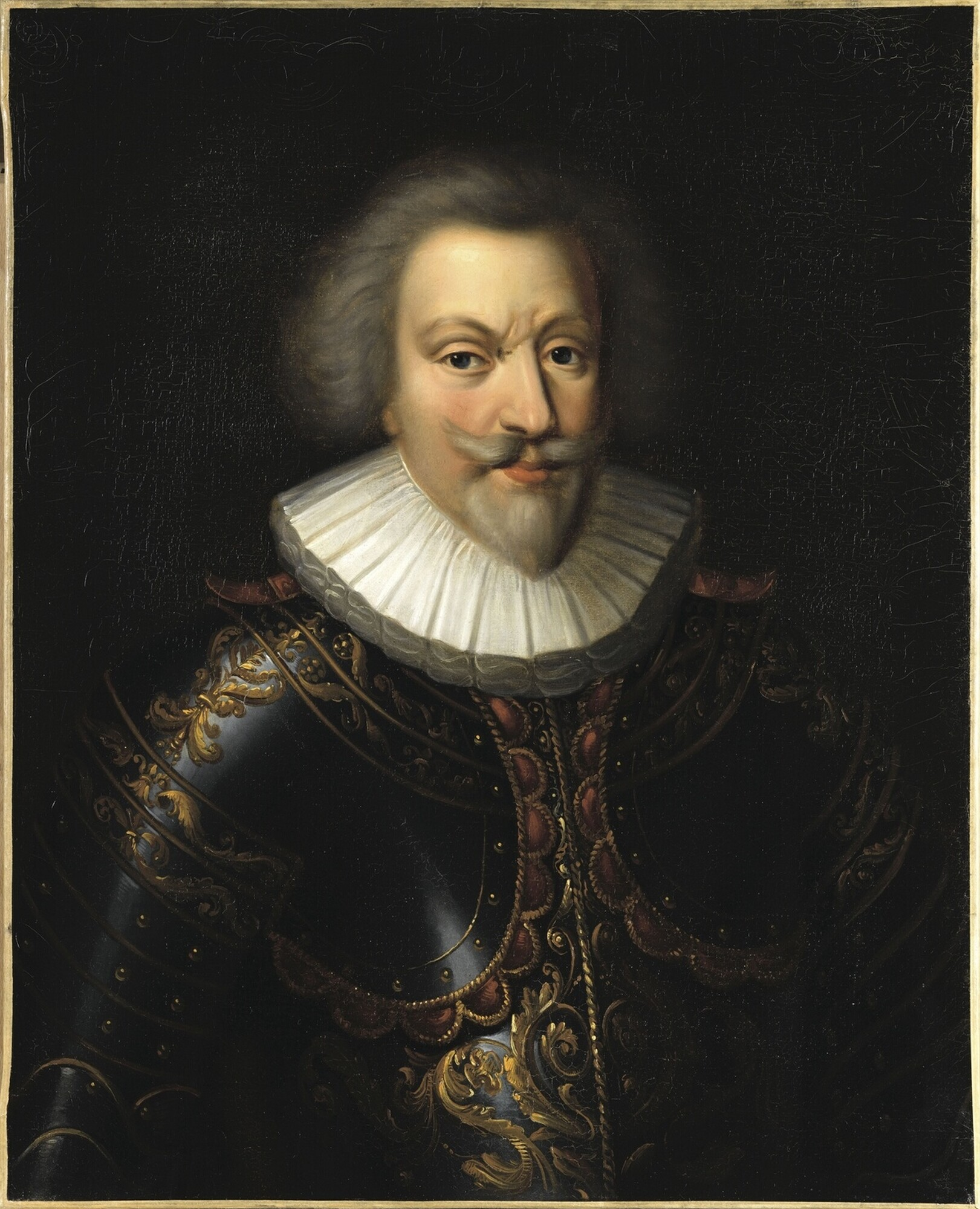
- Portrait by Théodore Ghirardi after a 17th-century portrait

Duke of Lorraine and Bar
- Reign: 25 November 1625 – 1 December 1625
- Predecessor: Nicole
- Successor: Charles IV
- Born: 27 February 1572; Ducal Palace of Nancy
- Died: 14 October 1632 (aged 60); Badonviller, France
- Spouse: Christina of Salm (m. 1597; died 1627)
- Issue: Charles, Duke of Lorraine; Henriette, Princess of Lexin; Nicolas, Duke of Lorraine; Marguerite, Duchess of Orléans
Names
- French: François de Lorraine; English: Francis of Lorraine
- House: Lorraine
- Father: Charles III, Duke of Lorraine
- Mother: Princess Claude of France

Francis II (François de Lorraine; 27 February 1572 – 14 October 1632) was the son of Charles III, Duke of Lorraine and Claude of Valois. He was Duke of Lorraine briefly in 1625, quickly abdicating in favour of his son.

== Biography ==
The youngest son of Charles III, Duke of Lorraine, and his wife Claude of France, Francis was styled the Count of Vaudémont during his father's reign (1545–1608) as well as during that of his older brother Henry II (1608–1624). His father appointed him as his deputy (Lieutenant General) of Lorraine, while in 1594 he was out of the country.

That same year he was Lieutenant General of the French king in Toul and Verdun. From September to October 1606 he was in his father's diplomatic mission in England. Rowland Whyte mentioned him dancing at Hampton Court in the presence chamber of Anne of Denmark. He spent much of the time hunting with King James away from London, where there was plague. They returned to Hampton Court and James gave him a jewel worth 10,000 crowns. Anne of Denmark wrote to his father expressing her pleasure and mentioning King James's nearest in blood to the family.

In 1621 Francis fell out with his brother Duke Henry II, who had become duke in 1608, and went to Germany to fight for the Holy Roman Emperor against the Protestants. The rift stemmed from Henry's attempt to name his daughter, Nicolette of Lorraine as heir to duchy and arrange her marriage to Fancis's son, Charles, despite the wil of Duke René II establishing strictly agnatic (male-only succession).Henry and his wife Margherita Gonzaga had only had daughters. After negotiations, the issue was then resolved and the marriage took place but the couple did not have any children and the duchy was to revert to Francis' other son, the future Nicholas II, Duke of Lorraine.

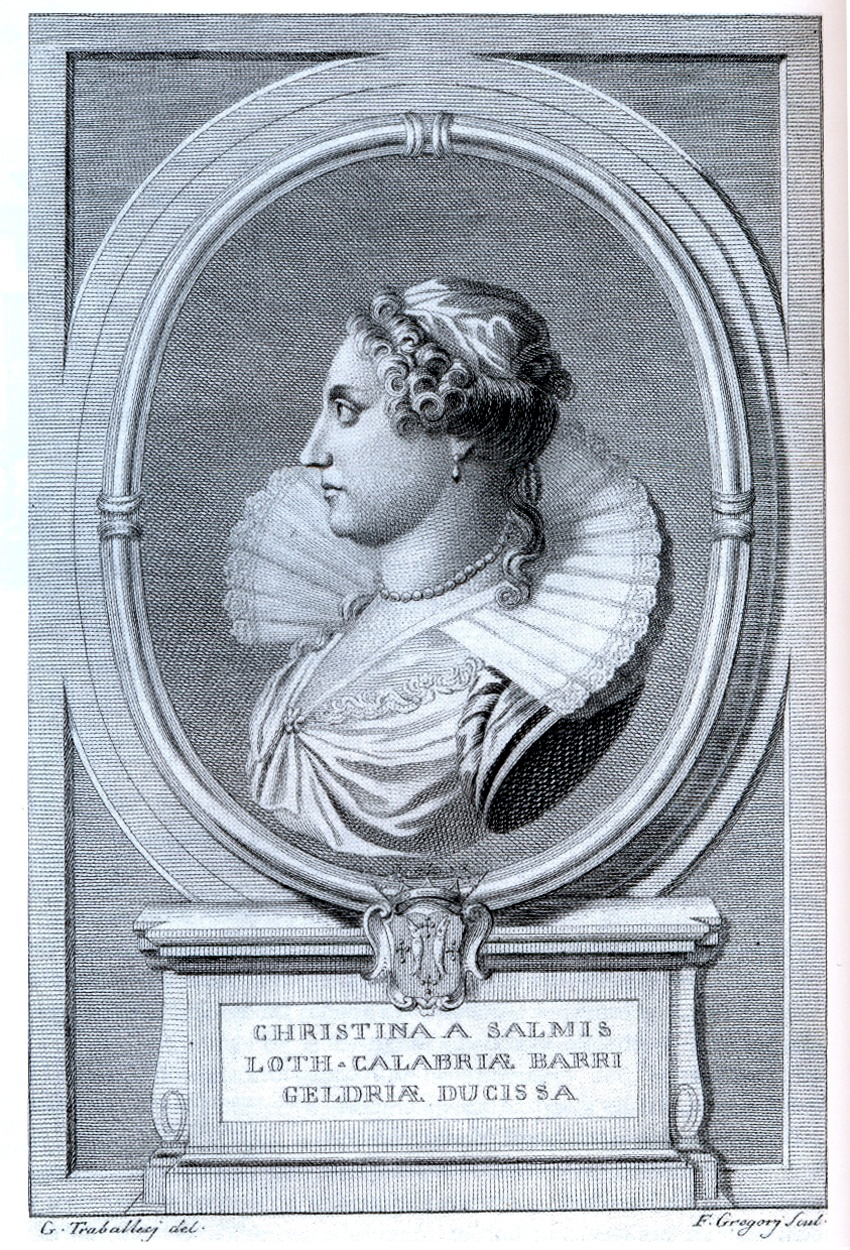
Engraving of his wife, Christina of Salm.

After Francis' brother died on 31 July 1624, the situation became complicated; Henry's final rules specified that Charles could only be the Duke of Lorraine as Nicolette's husband.

In November 1625, however, it was Francis himself who became the ruler of Lorraine. Having claimed the duchy for himself, he got it on 21 November 1625 from the duchy's States General.

After he had paid the duchy's debt out of its treasury five days later, he abdicated in favour of his son, who by then had pushed aside his wife and who then ruled in his own right.

In his will, Francis stated that he "never had ambitions to wear a crown in this world". After his abdication, Francis II took on the management of the county of Vaudémont. He died less than a year later.

== Family ==
He married Christina of Salm and had the following issue:

1. Henri de Lorraine, Marquis of Hattonchâtel (3 March 1602 – 20 April 1611) died young;
2. Charles de Lorraine, Duke of Lorraine (1604–1675) married Nicolette of Lorraine, no issue; married (bigamously) Béatrix de Cusance and had issue (he also remarried Beatrix after the death of Nicolette); married Marie Louise d'Aspremont, no issue;
3. Henriette de Lorraine (7 April 1605 – 16 November 1660), married Louis de Lorraine, Prince of Lexin, son of Louis II, Cardinal of Guise, no issue;
4. Nicolas, Duke of Lorraine (1609–1670), married Claude de Lorraine and had issue;
5. Marguerite de Lorraine (1615–1672), married Gaston de France, Duke of Orléans and had issue;
6. Christine de Lorraine (16 August 1621 – 19 December 1622) died in infancy.

== Ancestry ==
Ancestors of Francis II of Lorraine

8. Anthony, Duke of Lorraine
4. Francis I, Duke of Lorraine
9. Renée of Bourbon
2. Charles III, Duke of Lorraine
10. Christian II of Denmark
5. Christina of Denmark
11. Isabella of Austria
1. Francis II, Duke of Lorraine
12. Francis I of France
6. Henry II of France
13. Claude, Duchess of Brittany
3. Claude of Valois
14. Lorenzo de' Medici, Duke of Urbino
7. Catherine de' Medici
15. Madeleine de La Tour d'Auvergne

== Sources ==
- Tenace, Edward Shannon (2012). "Messianic Imperialism or Traditional Dynasticism? The Grand Strategy of Philip II and the Spanish Failure in the Wars of the 1590s". In Andrade, Tonio; Reger, William (eds.). The Limits of Empire: European Imperial Formations in Early Modern World History: Essays in Honor of Geoffrey Parker. Ashgate Publishing. pp. 281–308.

Preceded by Nicole	Duke of Lorraine; 25 November 1625 – 1 December 1625	Succeeded by Charles IV
