= Henry II of Lorraine =

Duke of Lorraine and Bar from 1608 to 1624

Henry II "the Good"
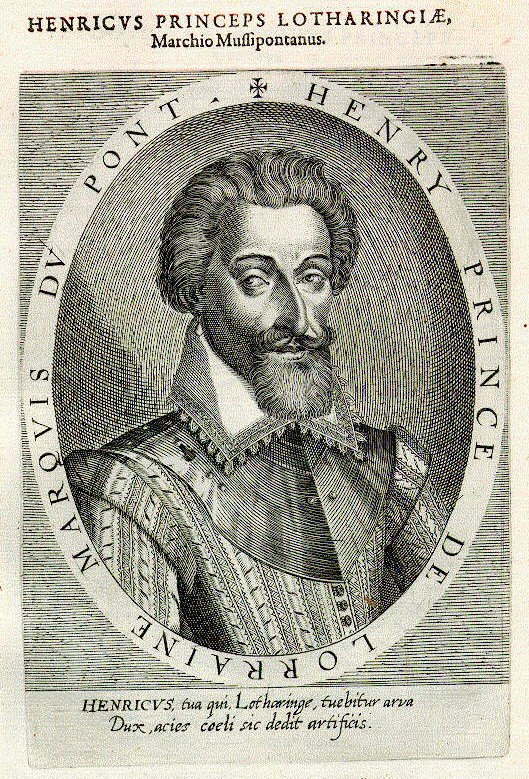
- Portrait by Dominicus Custos, c. 1602

Duke of Lorraine and Bar
- Reign: 14 May 1608 – 31 July 1624
- Predecessor: Charles III
- Successor: Nicole
- Born: 8 November 1563; Ducal Palace of Nancy, Lorraine
- Died: 31 July 1624 (aged 60); Ducal Palace of Nancy, Lorraine
- Spouse: Catherine of Bourbon (m. 1599; died 1604) Margherita Gonzaga (m. 1606)
- Issue: Nicole, Duchess of Lorraine; Claude, Duchess of Lorraine
Names
- Henri
- House: Lorraine
- Father: Charles III, Duke of Lorraine
- Mother: Claude of France
- Religion: Roman Catholicism

Henry II (French: Henri II; 8 November 1563 – 31 July 1624), known as "the Good (le Bon)", was Duke of Lorraine from 1608 until his death. Leaving no sons, both of his daughters became Duchesses of Lorraine by marriage. He was a brother-in-law of Henry IV of France.

== History and family ==
Henry was the son of Charles III, Duke of Lorraine, and Claude of Valois, daughter of Henry II of France and Catherine de' Medici. His paternal grandparents were Francis I, Duke of Lorraine, and Christina of Denmark. The splendour of his baptism in Bar-le-Duc was recalled by his aunt Margaret of Valois, who was ten at the time.

Henry married, firstly, Catherine of Bourbon, Duchess of Albret, daughter Antoine of Navarre and Jeanne d'Albret, sister of King Henry IV of France. The couple were married at the Château de Saint Germain-en-Laye outside Paris on 31 January 1599. The bride was already 39 years of age and the union was merely to secure relations with the House of Bourbon which had previously been rivals with the House of Lorraine. As Catherine was a Protestant and Henry was a Catholic, a papal dispensation was needed for the two to marry. Pope Clement VIII refused to grant a dispensation, but Catherine's brother, Henry, convinced their illegitimate half-brother, Charles, Archbishop of Rouen, to officiate at the wedding.

Catherine died childless in 1604, aged 45. With no issue from that union, Duke Henry married, secondly, Margherita Gonzaga on 24 April 1606 in Mantua. She was the eldest daughter of Vincenzo Gonzaga, Duke of Mantua and his wife Eleonora de' Medici. Margherita's sister Eleonor Gonzaga was a future Holy Roman Empress.

Henry was succeeded by his younger brother as Francis II, Duke of Lorraine.

== Issue ==
Henry and Margherita had four daughters, two of whom survived to adulthood:

- Stillborn daughter (February 1607).
- Nicole of Lorraine (3 October 1608 – 23 February 1657), married her cousin, Charles IV, Duke of Lorraine, separated in 1635.
- A daughter (10 February 1611 - 11 February 1611).
- Claude Françoise de Lorraine (6 October 1612 – 2 August 1648), married her cousin, Nicholas II, Duke of Lorraine,

== Sources ==
- Bogdan, Henry (2007). La Lorraine des ducs (in French). Perrin.
- Duke, A. C. (2009). Pollmann, Judith; Spicer, Andrew (eds.). Dissident Identities in the Early Modern Low Countries. Ashgate.
- Knecht, R.J. (1999). Catherine de' Medici (2nd ed.). Longman.
- Pitts, Vincent J. (2009). Henri IV of France: His Reign and Age. The Johns Hopkins University Press.
- Ward, Adolphus William; Prothero, G.W.; Leathes, Stanley, eds. (1911). The Cambridge Modern History. Vol. 13. The Macmillan Co.

Preceded by Charles III	Duke of Lorraine and Bar and Marquis of Pont-à-Mousson; 1608–1624	Succeeded by Nicole
Preceded by Marie	Marquis of Nomeny; 1610–1624	Succeeded by Nicole
