= Melchior de la Vallée =

French priest

Melchior de la Vallee (died 1631) was a French priest who was executed for witchcraft. His case was an important one, being connected to the divorce proceedings and political conflict between the Duke and Duchess of Lorraine.

In 1631, Charles IV, Duke of Lorraine tried to divorce his spouse Nicole, Duchess of Lorraine by an annulment by accusing the vicar who performed their marriage ceremony, Melchior de La Vallee, for witchcraft. The Pope did not ultimately agree to the demand of annulment. However, Melchior de La Vallee was executed by being burned at the stake for witchcraft.
