= Nicole, Duchess of Lorraine =

Duchess of Lorraine and Bar from 1624 to 1625

Nicole
- 17th century portrait

Duchess of Lorraine and Bar
- Reign: 31 July 1624 – 25 November 1625
- Predecessor: Henry II
- Successor: Francis II

Duchess consort of Lorraine
- Tenure: 1 December 1625 – 19 January 1634
- Born: 3 October 1608; Nancy, Lorraine
- Died: 2 February 1657 (aged 48); Paris, France
- Spouse: Charles IV, Duke of Lorraine (m. 1621)
- House: Lorraine
- Father: Henry II, Duke of Lorraine
- Mother: Margherita Gonzaga

Nicole (3 October 1608 – 2 February 1657) was reigning Duchess of Lorraine and Bar from 1 August 1624 to 21 November 1625, and duchess consort of Lorraine in 1625–1634. She was born in Nancy, the daughter of Henry II, Duke of Lorraine and Bar, and Margherita Gonzaga.

== Early life ==
In the absence of a son, Margherita and Henry attempted to secure the inheritance of Lorraine and Bar for their eldest daughter Nicole. Her father had no son and wanted to leave the Duchy of Lorraine to Nicole, but a supposed testament by René II of Lorraine specified that the duchy could not bypass the male lineage. However, Francis, Count of Vaudémont (Henry II's younger brother) refused Nicole's right by claiming that the Salic law applied in Lorraine. After negotiations with the male heirs, she married Francis' eldest son Charles on 23 May 1621. They had no children.

== Duchess regnant of Lorraine ==
Her father Henry II died 31 July 1624. She thereby became duchess of Lorraine with the support of her mother.

In November 1625, Nicole's rights were challenged by her uncle and father-in-law, Francis, and her cousin-husband. He made his claim based on the "testament" of Rene II, claimed the duchy.

Her mother Margherita Gonzaga travelled to the French royal court in Paris and successfully asked Louis XIII of France to send a French army to support her daughters right and duchess regnant of Lorraine. When Louis XIII sent an army under Louis de Marillac to the Duchy, however, Francis managed to win over the support of the States-General of Lorraine, who were afraid of France, and they declared him duke on 21 November 1625, deposing Nicole; five days later he abdicated in favor of his son, who became Charles IV of Lorraine. The latter had managed to remove his wife's power and become duke in his own right.

After this event, France retracted their military support to Margherita Gonzaga and Nicole; Margherita Gonzaga made repeated attempts to secure French support for her daughter, but France was unwilling to engage further, although it did give Margherita support in words.

== Duchess consort of Lorraine ==
In December 1627, Nicole's maternal uncle Vincenzo II Gonzaga died, after which the War of the Mantuan Succession began. Nicole's mother Margherita Gonzaga pressed her own right to Montferrat, which in contrast to Mantua allowed female succession; a theory is that she wanted to give her daughter Nicole a realm from her mother, since she had been deprived of her father's realm. However, Margherita was not able to secure any support for her claim, particularly since her closest ally France supported Charles of Nevers. In the Regensburg Treaty of October 1630, she was given the right to compensation for having given of her claims (against her will).

Married by dynastic interest, the gap between Nicole and her husband grew with the events of 1625. In 1631, Margherita Gonzaga defended her daughter Nicole when her son-in-law tried to divorce Nicole with an annulment by accusing the vicar who performed their marriage ceremony, Melchior de La Vallee, for witchcraft. That injustice was not corroborated by the Church and Charles IV remained officially married to Nicole.

In 1635, Charles took the opportunity to get rid of his wife's authority, the false pretext that he had not been free to choose at the time of his marriage, but did not persuade the papacy to annul the marriage.

Nicole separated from her husband and settled in Paris, where she enjoyed the support of the French royal court. Her husband remarried to Béatrix de Cusance in 1637 despite being still married to Nicole, due to which he was excommunicated in 1642. From Paris, Nicole continued with appeals to have both her marriage as well as her right to Lorraine acknowledged. She was successful in having her marriage legally recognized, but never secured support to be reinstated as the ruler of Lorraine. In 1654, her estranged husband was captured by the Spanish and Lorraine taken by Spain. From Paris Nicole unsuccessfully negotiated to secure her husband's release and her own reinstatement as ruler of Lorraine. She died in Paris.

Regnal titles
Preceded by Henry II	Duchess of Lorraine; 1624–1625	Succeeded by Francis II
French nobility
Preceded by Christina of Salm	Duchess consort of Lorraine; 1625–1634	Succeeded by Claude Françoise de Lorraine
