= Eleanor de' Medici =

Duchess of Mantua

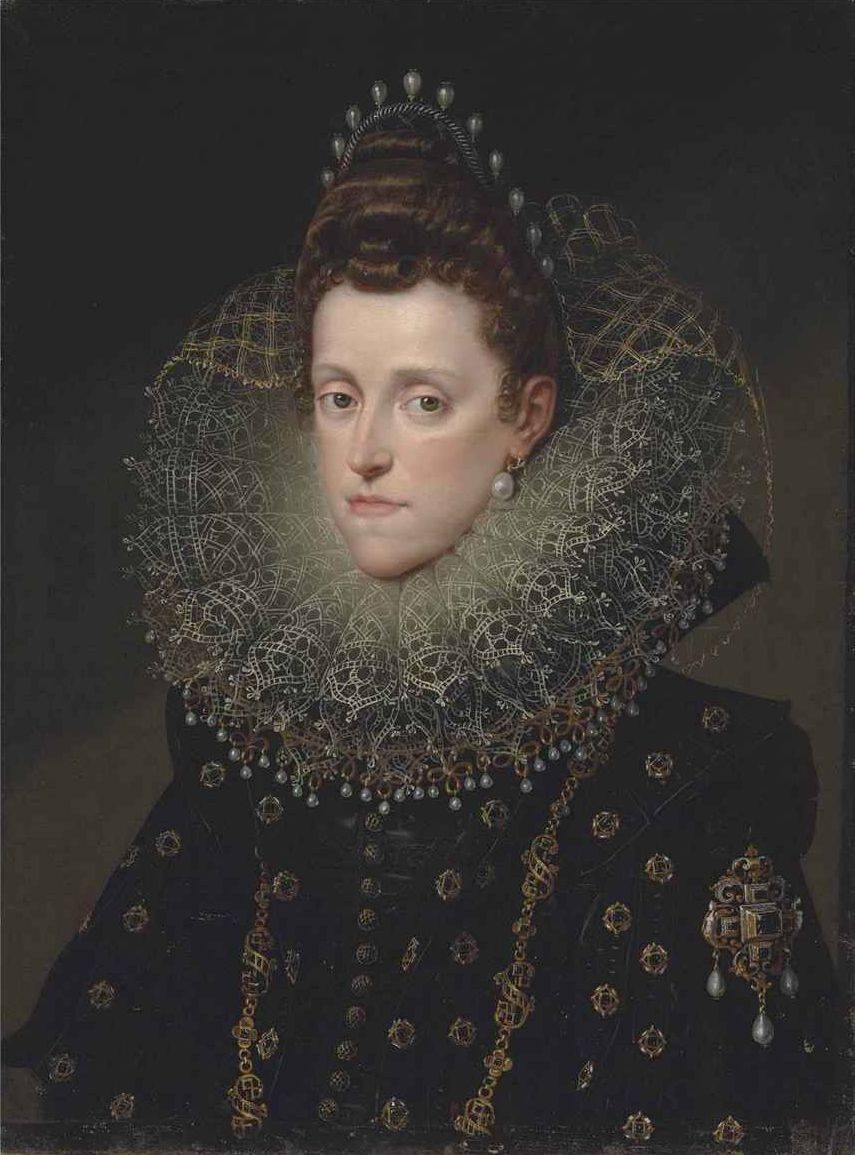
- Portrait of Eleanor whilst duchess of Mantua, c. 1600

Duchess consort of Mantua and Montferrat
- Tenure: 14 August 1587 – 9 September 1611
- Born: 28 February 1567; Florence, Republic of Florence (now in Italy)
- Died: 9 September 1611 (aged 44); Cavriana, Duchy of Mantua (now in Italy)
- Spouse: Vincenzo I Gonzaga (m. 1584)
- Issue: Francesco IV, Duke of Mantua; Ferdinando I, Duke of Mantua; Margherita, Duchess of Lorraine; Vincenzo II, Duke of Mantua; Eleonora, Holy Roman Empress
Names
- Eleonora di Francesco de' Medici
- House: Medici
- Father: Francesco I de' Medici, Grand Duke of Tuscany
- Mother: Joanna of Austria

Eleanor de' Medici (28 February 1567 – 9 September 1611) was a Duchess of Mantua by marriage to Vincenzo I Gonzaga. She served as regent of Mantua in 1595, 1597 and 1601, when Vincenzo served in the Austrian campaign in Hungary, and in 1602, when he left for Flanders for medical treatment. She was a daughter of Francesco I de' Medici and Joanna of Austria and the sister of Marie de' Medici, Queen of France.

== Early life ==
Eleanor, born Eleonora, was born in Florence, Tuscany, Italy, on 28 February 1567, as the eldest child of Francesco I de' Medici and his first wife Archduchess Joanna. Her baptism took place the same year and was attended by Cardinal Innocenzo Ciocchi Del Monte an adoptive nephew of Pope Julius III. Cardinal Spinello de' Benci performed the ceremony on behalf of Pope Pius V. The baptism was celebrated also with hunting excursions and parties.

It was at first believed Eleanor would marry Francis, Duke of Anjou, son of Henry II of France and Catherine de' Medici. In 1570 it was feared Eleanor had contracted smallpox but this was not the case, she had only a fever from which she recovered. Her parents and grandfather Cosimo sent her flasks of holy water as she recovered from her illness.

In 1574 when Eleanor was seven years of age, her grandfather Cosimo died so her father became Grand Duke of Tuscany. In 1578, when Eleanor was eleven her mother died, and her father later married Bianca Cappello. Medici was one of seven children; one of her sisters, Marie de' Medici became queen of France and was the mother of Louis XIII. Another sister, Anna, died at the age of 14; Eleanor wrote to her father on behalf of the dying Anna, who wished to see her father, but Anna died the same day. The rest of Eleanor and Marie's siblings also died during childhood.

== Duchess of Mantua ==
=== Wedding and celebrations ===
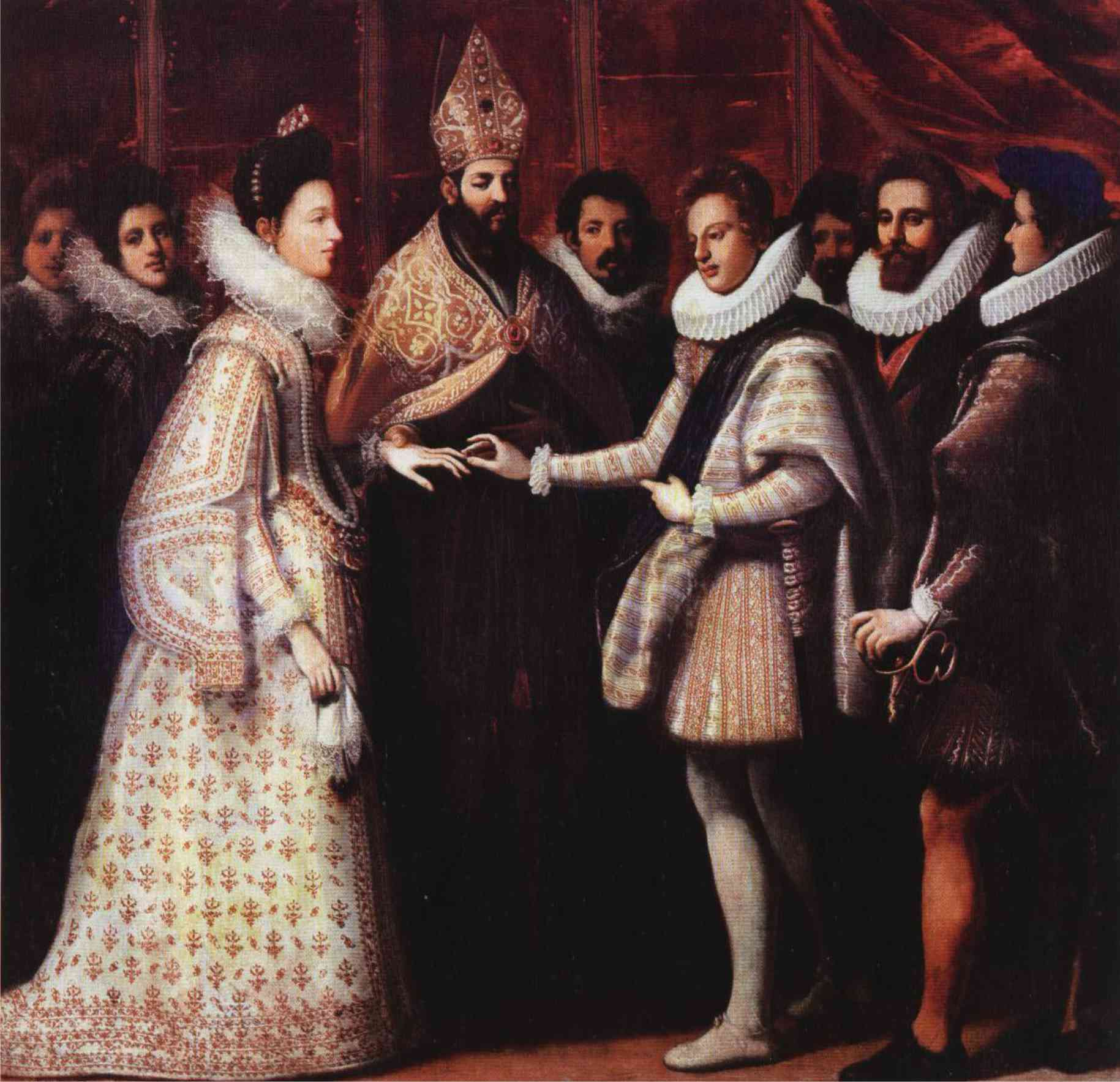
Marriage of Eleanor de' Medici and Duke Vincenzo I Gonzaga

Medici married Vincenzo I Gonzaga on 29 April 1584, as his second wife after he divorced Margherita Farnese. Celebrations for the signing of the marriage contract on 4 April 1584 took place in Mantua, including bells ringing and fireworks being set off. Eight days after the celebrations, the couple traveled to Florence to meet Eleanor's father Grand Duke Francesco and her stepmother Bianca Cappello. At this point Vincenzo kept a portrait of Eleanor by his bed. On 10 April, Francesco sent a letter to Philip II of Spain asking for permission for Eleanor and Vincenzo to be married, although Francesco also wished for proof of his son-in-law's fertility before concluding marriage negotiations.

On 3 May 1584, Eleanor arrived in Mantua. After arriving by boat, Eleanor disembarked at Miglioretto (the shores of the Mincio river immediately downstream from Mantua) and was accompanied to Palazzo Te by Ottavio Farnese, Duke of Parma, her husband Vincenzo, and many noblemen and women from Piacenza, Parma, and Mantua. After resting at Palazzo Te, Eleanor changed into a jewelled silver-brocade dress and made her entry into the city to salvos of arquebuses and artillery while riding in a semi-covered gilded carriage pulled by four white horses and accompanied by the Mantuan military, mounted arquebusiers, light cavalry, noblemen and women in carriages. After arriving at the Castello di San Giorgio she proceeded to the palatine church of Santa Barbara and the Ducal Palace where she was greeted at the foot of the stairs by Duke and Duchess of Mantua, Guglielmo Gonzaga and Eleanor of Austria. After a meal she was accompanied by Cardinals Gianfrancesco Gambara and Giovanni Vincenzo Gonzaga di Guastalla by boat to Palazzo Te, where she was visited by Cardinal Alessandro Farnese and Duke of Parma.

=== Duchess consort of Mantua ===
Eleanor initially had several portraits commissioned to be made of her deceased mother Joanna as well as her deceased siblings Anna and Filippo, but was unhappy with the length of time taken to paint the portraits. On 7 May 1586, Eleanor gave birth to her first child, a son named Francesco; during the pregnancy her father sent her a present of some plums. The following year, Eleanor's father-in-law Guglielmo died, Vincenzo becoming Duke of Mantua whilst Eleanor served as his Duchess consort. The same year, she gave birth to a second son, Ferdinando, after a difficult pregnancy. In the following years, Eleanor had further children: firstly a son, Guglielmo Domenico in 1589, who died young, then in 1591 a daughter, Margherita, who married Henry II, Duke of Lorraine, followed by a son, Vincenzo in 1594, who succeeded his older brothers. She then suffered a miscarriage in 1596, four months into pregnancy, and in 1598 she gave birth to a second daughter, also named Eleanor, who married Ferdinand II, Holy Roman Emperor.

In October 1600, Eleanor attended the wedding of her sister Marie to Henry IV of France. In 1601, Queen Marie gave birth to her first child and son, the future Louis XIII; Marie made her sister Eleanor the godmother of the child.

In 1602, Vincenzo traveled to Flanders in search of medical treatment, leaving Eleanor in control of the duchy. She sent the news of her post to Ferdinando I de' Medici, in a letter also containing a list of men condemned to the galleys.

During the winter of 1603–1604, Galileo visited the Mantuan court in an effort to obtain a position there, and was offered a salary, but could not agree on the terms with Vincenzo, who instead presented Galileo with a gold chain and two silver dishes. In 1606, Eleanor accompanied her daughter Margherita to Lorraine for her marriage to Duke Henry.

=== Death and funeral ===
Eleanor fell ill in the first quarter of 1611 with a prolonged illness, but seemed to recover by April. She retired for two months to the Palazzo di Porto in Porto Mantovano, "one mile from the city and beautiful for its gardens and fresh water." With the arrival of hotter weather, Eleanor moved north to the hill-top fortified villa at Cavriana. There, on the day after the Feast of the Birth of the Virgin, her health rapidly declined and died on 9 September 1611, aged forty four. At the time of her death, her husband Duke Vincenzo was in Casale Monferrato; he outlived her by only one year, dying in 1612.

After her death, Eleanor's body was placed in a "lead casket" (which in turn was placed inside a wooden casket sealed with pitch and draped with a black velvet cloth), and accompanied by "numerous priests from the outlying towns" to the parish church of Cavriana, where she lay in state for two days. Next her body was transported to Mantua on a "cart draped with black fabric" and pulled by six horses caparisoned in black and accompanied by twelve "priests on horseback" and twelve "foot attendants bearing burning torches" and followed by twelve carriages carrying members of the Gonzaga family and twelve carts, also covered in black. Eleanor's body was then taken to the Corte Vecchia where her body was deposited to await the return of Vincenzo.

When Duke Vincenzo returned to Mantua on 3 October 1611, plans were made for Eleanor's funeral to be held on the Feast of Saint Francesco (it was then delayed by a few days so that preparations in Sant'Andrea could be finished). During this interim period, her body was placed upon a "beautiful catafalque resplendant with many candles" that had been specially constructed in the aforementioned oratory and accompanied by priests from Santa Barbara and tertiary nuns from the city's major churches. The funerary functions were performed by the Bishop of Casale, since the bishop of Mantua, Annibale ("Francesco") Gonzaga di Bozzolo, was ill. The procession on foot that accompanied Eleanor's body from the oratory in the Corte Vecchia to Sant'Andrea was led by the "gonfalone" of the principal church and followed in order by members of the city's various civic and religious institutions, including: the misericordia, the city's various hospitals, schools, and churches (including the abbots of each).

== See also ==
- Descendants of Cosimo I de Medici
- Marie de' Medici
- House of Medici
- The Gonzaga Family in Adoration of the Holy Trinity

== Sources ==
- Cornelison, Sally J. (2012). Art and the Relic Cult of St. Antoninus in Renaissance Florence. Ashgate Publishing.
- Carter, Tim; Goldthwaite, Richard A. (2013). Orpheus in the Marketplace: Jacopo Peri and the Economy of Late Renaissance Florence. Harvard University Press.
- Parrott, David (1997). "The Mantuan Succession, 1627–31: A Sovereignty Dispute in Early Modern Europe". The English Historical Review. CXII (445, February). Oxford Academic: 20–65. doi:10.1093/ehr/CXII.445.20.
- Pellizzer, Sonia (1993). "Eleonora de' Medici, duchessa di Mantova". Dizionario Biografico degli Italiani (in Italian). Vol. 42.
