= Anne-Marie-Thérèse of Lorraine =

Anne-Marie-Thérèse Princess of Lorraine
- Born: 30 July 1648
- Died: 17 June 1661 (aged 12)
- Years active: 1657–1660
- Title: Abbess of Remiremont
- Predecessor: Élisabeth Marguerite d'Orléans
- Successor: Dorothea Maria of Salm
- Parents: Nicholas Francis, Duke of Lorraine (father); Claude-Françoise of Lorraine (mother)
- Family: House of Lorraine

Anne Marie Thérèse of Lorraine (30 July 1648 – 17 June 1661), was a Princess of Lorraine and was later a Princess Abbess of the Imperial Remiremont Abbey in France.

== Biography ==
Born into an ancient House of Lorraine, she was the youngest daughter of Nicholas Francis, Duke of Lorraine and his wife, Claude Françoise de Lorraine.

She was a minor during her entire rule and Remiremont was ruled by the Dame Doyenne, Hélène d'Anglure, and the Dame Sonière Bernarde de Cléron de Saffre (fl. 1704).
