= Nicholas Francis, Duke of Lorraine =

Duke of Lorraine and Bar in 1634

Nicholas Francis
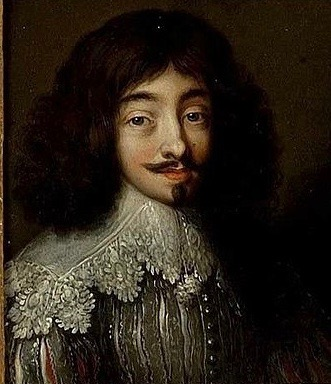
- Portrait by unknown, 17th century

Duke of Lorraine and Bar
- Reign: 19 January 1634 – 1 April 1634
- Predecessor: Charles IV
- Successor: Charles IV
- Born: 6 December 1609
- Died: 25 January 1670 (aged 60)
- Burial: 4 July 1670
- Spouse: Claude Françoise of Lorraine (m. 1634; died 1648)
- Issue Detail: Charles V, Duke of Lorraine; Anne Marie Thérèse of Lorraine
- House: Lorraine
- Father: Francis II, Duke of Lorraine
- Mother: Christina of Salm
- Religion: Roman Catholic

Nicholas Francis (French: Nicolas François; 6 December 1609 – 25 January 1670), also known as Nicholas II, was briefly Duke of Lorraine and Duke of Bar for a few months in 1634, spanning the time between the abdication of his older brother and his own resignation. He was therefore duke during the invasion of Lorraine by the French in the Thirty Years War.

He is the direct male ancestor of all rulers of the Habsburg-Lorraine dynasty, including all Emperors of Austria.

== Biography ==
Nicholas Francis was the youngest son of Duke Francis II of Lorraine and his wife, Christina of Salm. Born on the feast of Saint Nicholas, he was named in his honour.

As it appeared unlikely that he would succeed to the duchy, he was destined for the church. He was made coadjutor bishop of Toul, in spite of his youth, in 1619 and succeeded to the see in 1624, but never actually received any sacred orders. He studied philosophy and theology at the University of Pont-à-Mousson, 1622–1629. He returned to Nancy in June 1629. The thesis he prepared on the sacrament of penance was printed in Holland in 1627 with a dedication to Pope Urban VIII. After his promotion to the cardinalate, he received private lessons from two Jesuit priests.

Nicholas Francis was named abbot in commendam – a lucrative sinecure – of several abbeys and was sent on several embassies by his brother, Charles IV, Duke of Lorraine, and by King Louis XIII of France.

On 19 January 1626 he was created cardinal in pectore (secretly). The appointment was not proclaimed publicly until 30 August 1627. He never received the cardinal's red hat nor was he assigned a cardinal-deaconry. When in 1634 his brother Charles was pressured into resigning in his favor, he became sovereign Duke of Lorraine. He wrote to Pope Urban VIII, 4 March 1634, resigning as cardinal to marry his cousin Claude-Françoise of Lorraine, the second daughter of Henry II, on 17–18 February. On 8 March 1634, the pope declared him in nullo e sacris ordinis constitutum, depriving him of the title of cardinal and the diocese of Toul. In the consistory of 22 March 1634, the pope communicated this to the College of Cardinals.

Immediately following Nicholas's accession to the dukedom, the French invaded the duchy and forced the new duke to sign a treaty recognizing their right to occupy it. In April 1634, Nicholas himself fled into exile, and soon after abdicated himself, returning the claim to the duchy to his older brother, Charles. With one brief exception, Charles would not, however, be able to return to his duchy until 1661.

== Marriage and issue ==
He married his first cousin Claude Françoise of Lorraine who died in childbirth:

- Ferdinand Philippe, Hereditary Prince of Lorraine, jure matris Duke of Bar (29 December 1639 – 1 April 1659), died unmarried and without issue.
- Charles Léopold, Duke of Lorraine (3 April 1643 – 18 April 1690); married Eleonora Maria of Austria and had issue.
- Anne Eléonore (12 May 1645 – 28 February 1646); died in infancy, buried in the Ducal Crypt, Vienna.
- Anne Marie Thérèse (30 July 1648 – 17 June 1661); Abbess of Remiremont, no issue.

== See also ==
- Dukes of Bar

| Preceded by Charles IV | Duke of Lorraine; 1634 | Succeeded by French occupation next Duke: Charles IV |
