= Claude-Françoise of Lorraine =

Duchess consort of Lorraine (1612–1648)

Claude
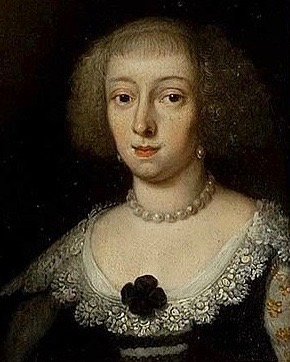
- Anonymous 17th-century portrait

Duchess consort of Lorraine
- Tenure: 18 February 1634 – 2 August 1648
- Born: 6 October 1612; Ducal Palace of Nancy, Lorraine
- Died: 2 August 1648 (aged 35); Vienna, Austria
- Burial: Church of Saint-François-des-Cordeliers, Nancy
- Spouse: Nicholas II, Duke of Lorraine (m. 1634)
- Issue Details...: Charles V, Duke of Lorraine; Anne Marie Thérèse, Abbess of Remiremont
Names
- Claude-Françoise de Lorraine
- House: Lorraine
- Father: Henry II, Duke of Lorraine
- Mother: Margherita Gonzaga
- Religion: Roman Catholic

Claude-Françoise of Lorraine (6 October 1612 – 2 August 1648) was Duchess consort of Lorraine as the wife of Nicholas II, Duke of Lorraine. A daughter of Henry II, Duke of Lorraine, she married her first cousin Nicholas in 1634 and was the mother of Charles V, Duke of Lorraine.

== Early life ==
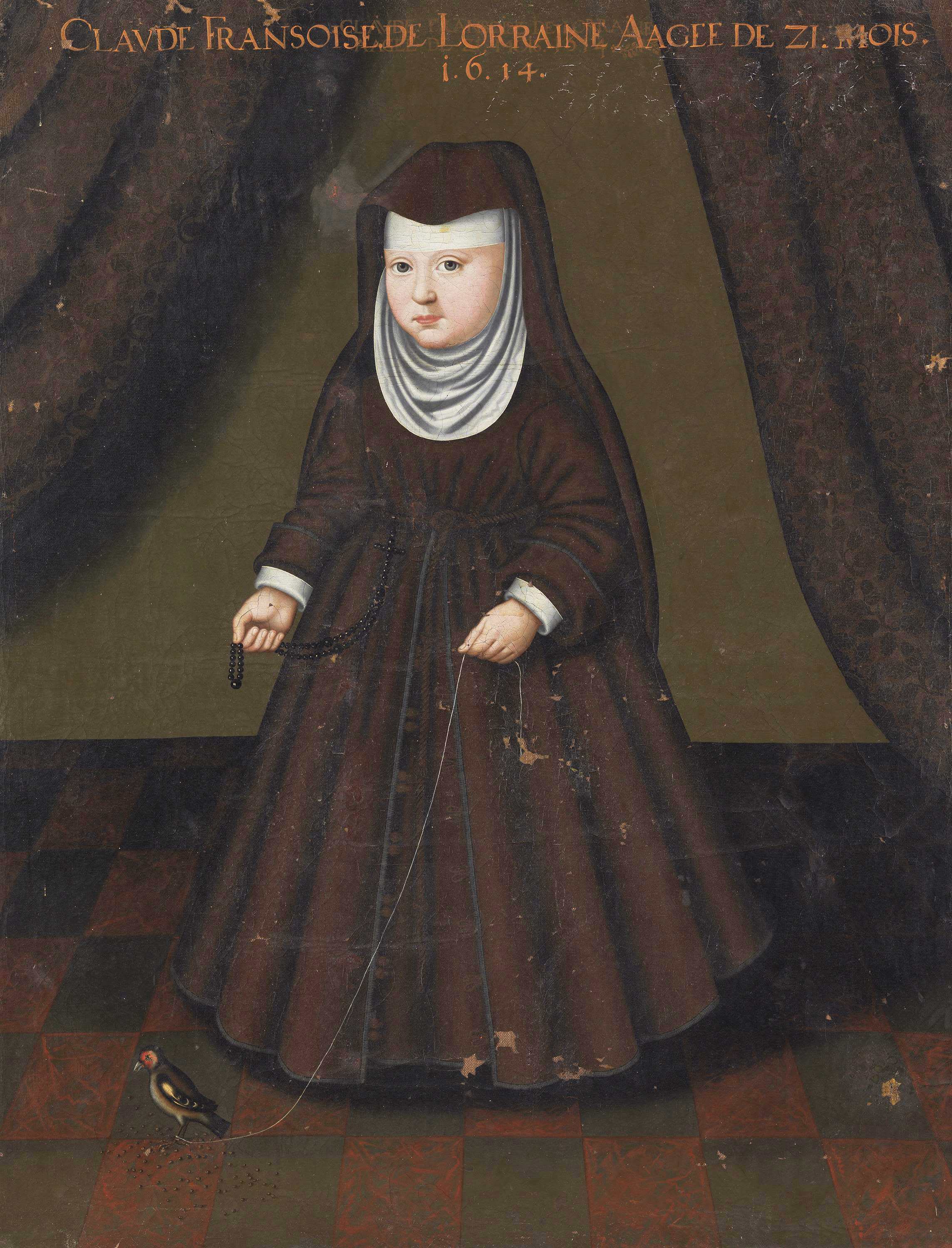
Claude Françoise aged 21 months, 1614

Claude was born into the House of Lorraine, being the younger daughter of Henry II, Duke of Lorraine, and his wife, Princess Margherita Gonzaga. Her elder sister was Nicole, Duchess of Lorraine.

== Marriage and exile ==
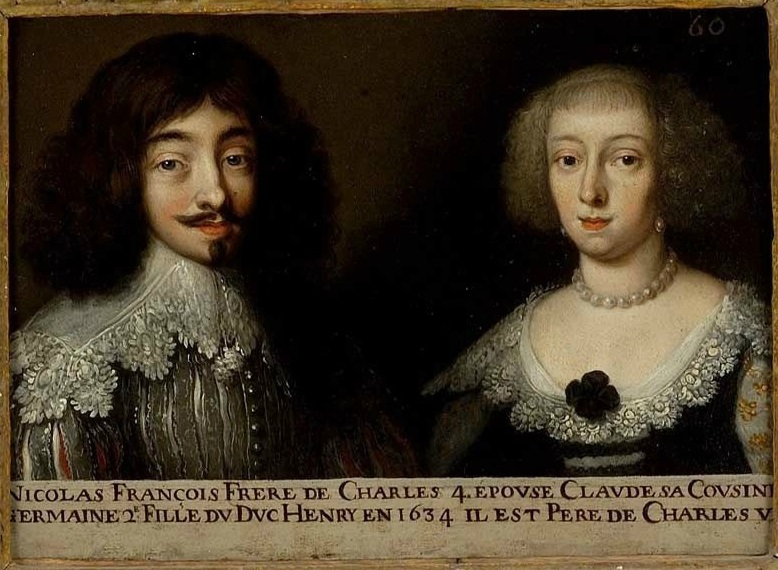
Claude Françoise with her husband Nicholas Francis, 1634

Her marriage was shaped by a succession crisis in the Duchy of Lorraine. In January 1634 her brother-in-law Charles IV abdicated in favour of his younger brother Nicholas Francis, seeking to forestall French claims to the duchy advanced through Charles's wife, Claude-Françoise's sister Nicole. Nicholas Francis, who had been made a cardinal but had not taken major holy orders, married his first cousin Claude-Françoise at Lunéville on 18 February 1634. The couple had the following children:

- Ferdinand Philippe, Hereditary Prince of Lorraine, jure matris Duke of Bar (29 December 1639 – 1 April 1659)
- Charles Léopold, Duke of Lorraine (3 April 1643 – 18 April 1690); married Eleonora Maria of Austria and had issue;
- Anne Eléanore de Lorraine (12 May 1645 – 28 February 1648) died in infancy
- Anne Marie Thérèse de Lorraine (30 July 1648 – 17 June 1661); Abbess of Remiremont, no issue;
- Marie Anne de Lorraine (born 30 July 1648, date of death unknown).

After French forces under Cardinal Richelieu occupied Lorraine, Nicholas Francis and Claude-Françoise went into exile, settling at the imperial court in Vienna, where she remained until her death.

== Death ==
Claude Françoise died in Vienna, aged 35, having given birth to twins, Anne Marie Thérèse and Marie Anne. She was buried at the Church of Saint-François-des-Cordeliers, Nancy, Lorraine.

== Ancestry ==
Ancestors of Claude-Françoise of Lorraine

8. Francis I, Duke of Lorraine
4. Charles III, Duke of Lorraine
9. Christina of Denmark
2. Henry II, Duke of Lorraine
10. Henry II of France
5. Claude of Valois
11. Catherine de' Medici
1. Claude Françoise of Lorraine
12. Guglielmo Gonzaga, Duke of Mantua
6. Vincenzo Gonzaga, Duke of Mantua
13. Eleanor of Austria
3. Margherita Gonzaga
14. Francesco I de' Medici, Grand Duke of Tuscany
7. Eleonora de' Medici
15. Joanna of Austria

Royal titles
Preceded by Nicole, Duchess of Lorraine	Duchess consort of Lorraine; 1634–1648	Succeeded by Béatrix de Cusance
