= Charles IV of Lorraine =

Duke of Lorraine and Bar (1625–1675)

Charles IV
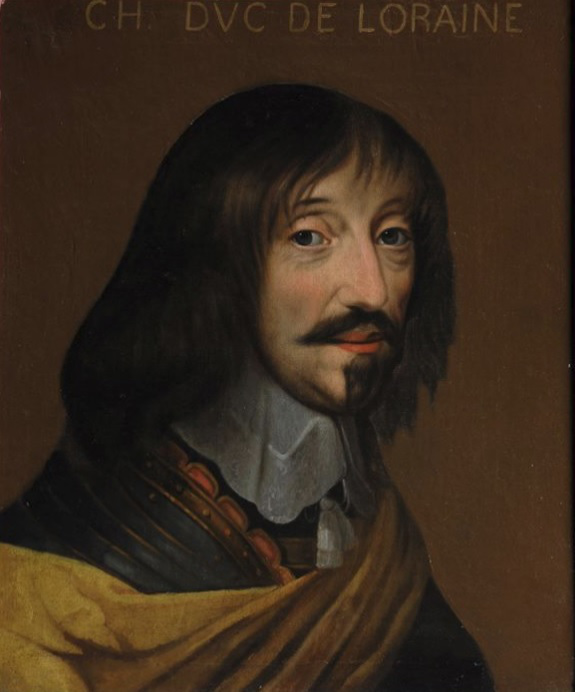
- Portrait by unknown, 17th century

Duke of Lorraine and Bar
- Reign: 1 December 1625 – 19 January 1634
- Predecessor: Francis II
- Successor: Nicholas II
- Reign: 1 April 1634 – 18 September 1675
- Predecessor: Nicholas II
- Successor: Charles V
- Born: 5 April 1604; Nancy
- Died: 18 September 1675 (aged 71); Allenbach
- Spouse: Nicolette of Lorraine (m. 1621; died 1657) Béatrice de Cusance (m. 1637; sep. 1642) (m. 1663; died 1663) Marie Louise d'Aspremont (m. 1665)
- Issue: Anne, wife of François Marie de Lorraine; Charles Henri, Prince of Vaudémont
Names
- Charles de Lorraine
- House: Lorraine
- Father: Francis II, Duke of Lorraine
- Mother: Christina of Salm

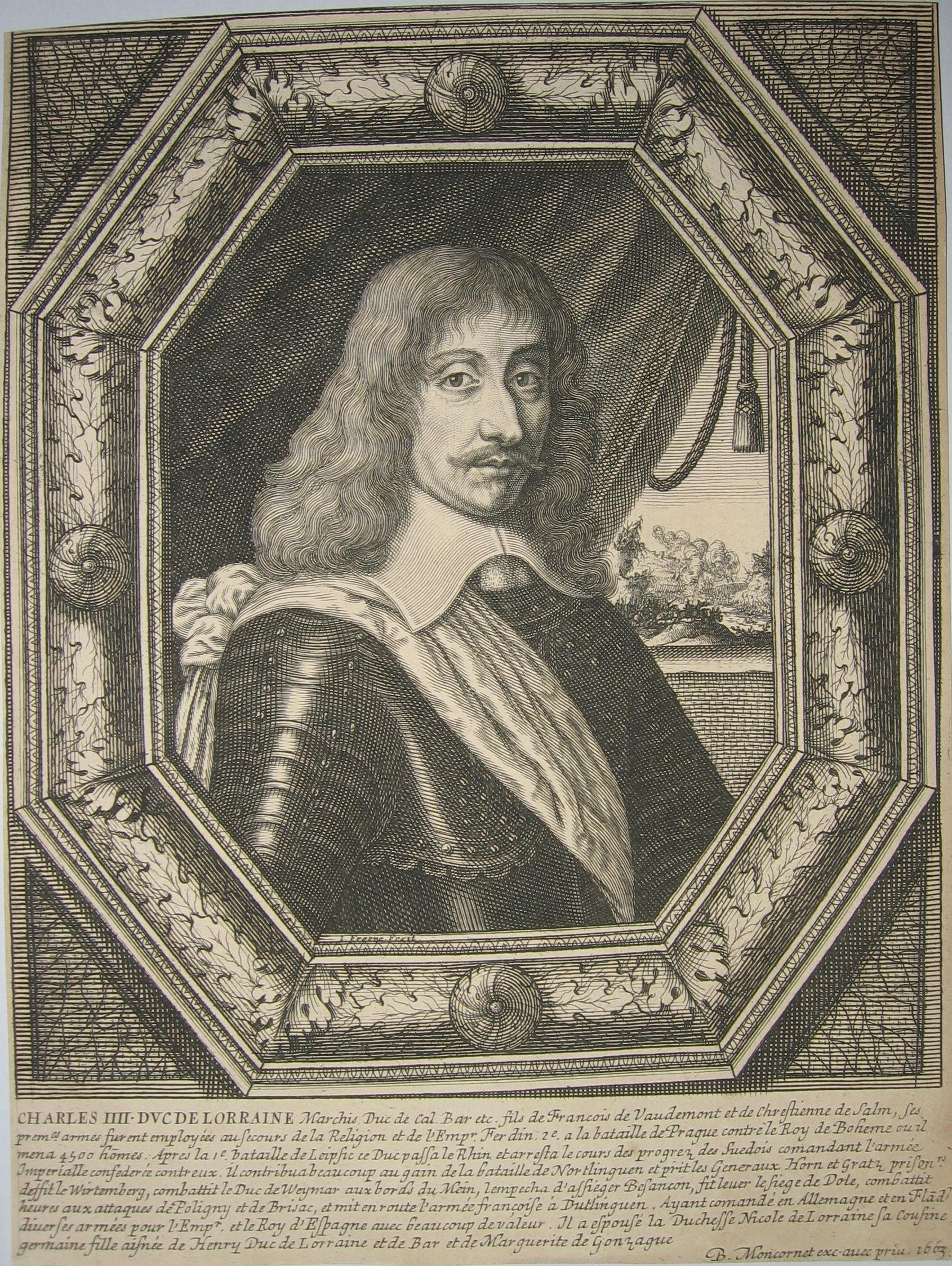
Charles IV

Charles IV (5 April 1604 – 18 September 1675) was Duke of Lorraine from 1624 until his death in 1675, with a brief interruption in 1634, when he abdicated under French pressure in favor of his younger brother, Nicholas Francis.

== Life ==
He came to lose his duchy because of his notionally anti-French policy; in 1633, French troops invaded Lorraine in retaliation for Charles's support of Gaston d'Orléans—who repeatedly plotted against Richelieu's governance of France under the childless Louis XIII and dallied dangerously with its enemies as a young heir presumptive—and Richelieu's policies were always anti-Habsburg so as to increase the strength and prestige of France at the expense of the two dynasties. Gaston d'Orléans, frequently sided with either branch of the Habsburg family against Richelieu, who was de facto ruler of France as its Chief Minister, and had to flee several times to avoid charges and trial for treason. His allies and confederates generally bore the price of these escapades by the young and impetuous heir and Charles IV was one such. On one visit to the ducal court at Nancy, the widowed Gaston fell in love with Charles's 15-year-old sister and married her secretly, which so infuriated the king that he convened the clergy of France and the Parlement of Paris to void the marriage, giving consent only on his death bed.

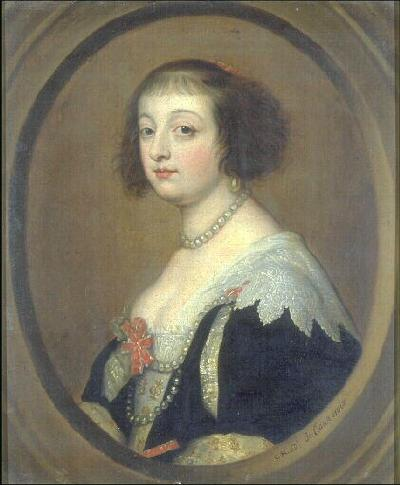
Béatrix de Cusance

In that circumstance and sense, Charles was a casualty of the fierce factional infighting in the French court between the King's brother Gaston d'Orléans, and Cardinal Richelieu, even though technically, Lorraine was subject to the Holy Roman Empire and the Emperor Ferdinand II of Austria. Forced to make humiliating concessions to France, he abdicated under the French pressure and invasion in 1634 in favor of his brother, Nicholas Francis, and entered the imperial service in the Thirty Years' War and was victorious at the Battle of Nördlingen. Shortly thereafter, Nicholas Francis too fled into exile and abdicated his claims, which were now taken up once again by Charles, who remained Duke of Lorraine in exile for the next quarter century.

In 1635, he tried in vain to recapture his duchy together with an Imperial army under Matthias Gallas. The aggressive Charles and the defensive-minded Gallas did not go along well; while Charles urged to recapture his capital Nancy, Gallas preferred to entrench his troops at the Seille to give them some rest after a long march from the Rhine. An outbreak of plague ended all hopes of further approaching Nancy. The next year, the Imperials sent Charles to the Spanish Franche-Comté, where he lifted the French siege of Dole and advanced as far as Dijon. Appointed captain general of the troops in Burgundy, Charles defended the core area of the Franche-Comté around Besançon, Dole and Salins against the French over the next few years. He also made repeated forays into the French heartland or into Lorraine to attack French garrisons. In May 1638, he advanced into Bassigny, moved from there to Lorraine, recaptured Épinal in August and besieged Lunéville in September. Since in the meantime Bernard of Saxe-Weimar was besieging the fortress Breisach on the Upper Rhine, Charles was called upon to relieve it and attack the besiegers from two sides at the same time, together with the Imperial and Bavarian troops on the right bank of the Rhine. Bernard, however, used the advantage of the inner line and was able to repulse Charles at Thann on 15 October as well as Johann von Götzen's attack on the siege positions around Breisach a few days later. The fall of Breisach on 17 December largely cut off Franche-Comté from the Empire and the rest of the Habsburg territories. Charles gave up the post of captain general in January 1639, relieved the besieged castle of his second wife in Belvoir and went to Brussels, where he hoped for a new command.

After Charles fought in the Spanish Netherlands in 1640, where he took part in the relief attempt of the Spanish army for Arras, he re-entered negotiations with France in early 1641, which returned his duchy to him as a French protectorate in the Treaty of Saint-Germain-en-Laye of 2 April 1641, on condition that he refrain from alliances detrimental to France. Charles's confidant Johann Wilhelm von Hunolstein, who was serving in the Bavarian military, announced the Lorraine negotiations with France to Emperor Ferdinand III and the Bavarian Elector at the Regensburg Imperial Diet. However, as Charles continued to work against Richelieu and cover up the conspiracy of the Count of Soissons, he should be arrested after the Cardinal caught the conspirators. In July 1641, he managed to evade this by fleeing. He re-entered military service, fighting first on the side of the Spanish in Flanders, later in the south-west of the empire, where he took part in the Battle of Tuttlingen in November 1643, in which he defeated the French together with Franz von Mercy and Johann von Werth.

In 1651 Charles IV was approached by an Irish delegation who were seeking his support to defend Ireland from the invasion of the Parliamentarian army of England. Traditional accounts of the Cromwellian wars often dismiss the appeal to Lorraine as an act of desperation, but recently one historian has argued that the stateless Duke was in fact seriously interested in becoming the Protector of Ireland. In the summer of 1652, a number of ships sent by Charles arrived at Inishbofin island with supplies, one of the last strongholds of the Irish. Unfortunately Charles faced great opposition by the Irish Leaders Clanricarde and Ormonde, both of whom were arch-royalists loyal to Charles II of England. Lorraine eventually concluded that Ireland had been destroyed by the jealousy of those who desired the loss of it, than they should be obliged for its recovery to the protection of his said Highness.

In 1661, the French withdrew from Lorraine, and Charles was able to return to the Duchy for the first time. In 1670, the duchy was again occupied by the French under King Louis XIV. Charles served in the Imperial armies in both the Thirty Years' War and the Franco-Dutch War (1672–1678), both of which secured French dominance on the Continent.

In 1675 he defeated François de Créquy at Konzer Brucke, and died the same year in Austrian service.
The duchy was not restored to his family until more than twenty years later.

He is sometimes numbered as Charles III of Lorraine.

== Issue ==
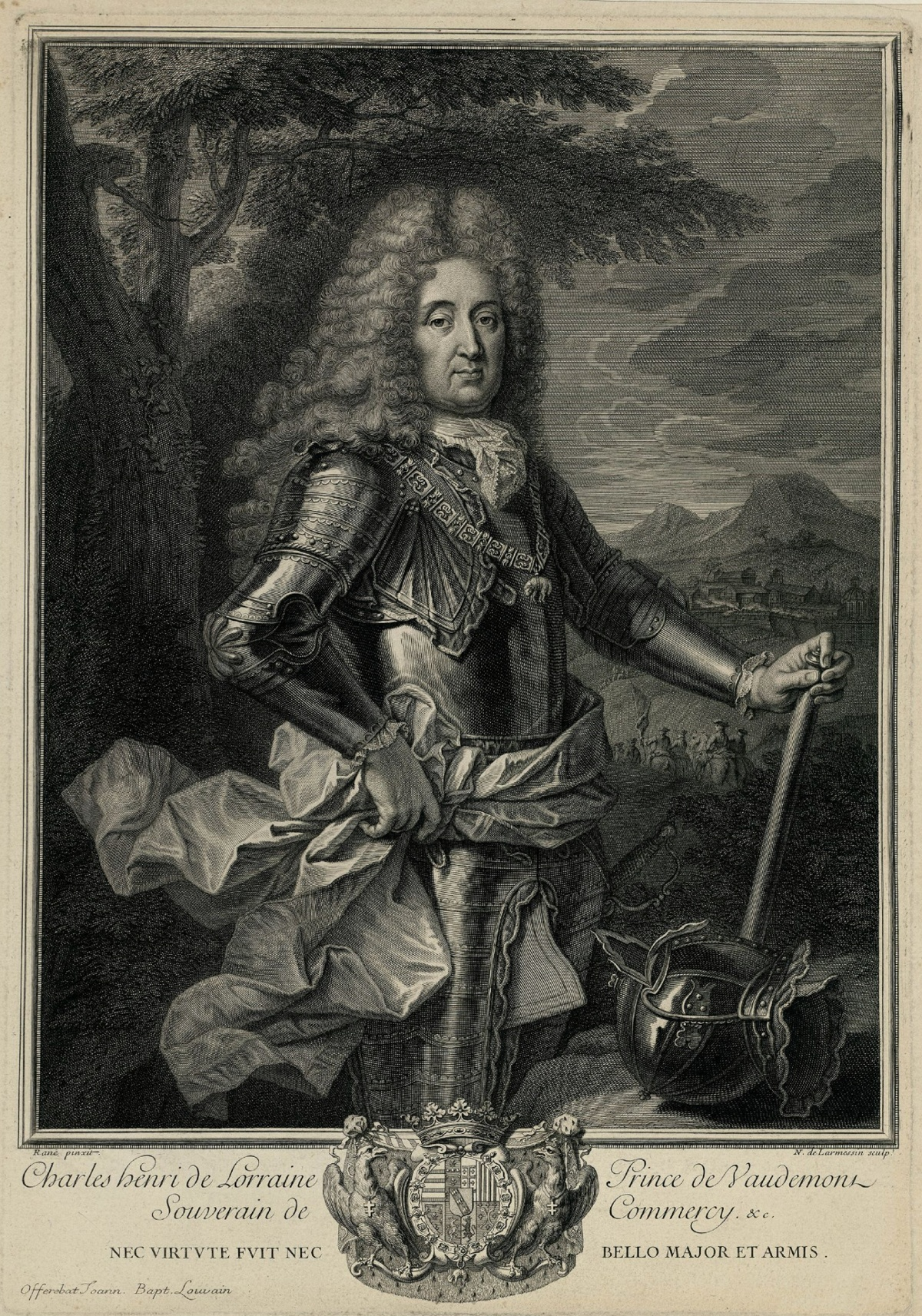
Charles's only surviving son, Charles Henri.

Charles married first Nicolette of Lorraine, whom he deposed and replaced as monarch of Lorraine in 1625. They had no children and Charles abandoned her.

On 2 April 1637, he married Béatrice de Cusance, Princess de Cantecroix (1614–1663), daughter and heiress of Claude-François de Cusance, Baron de Belvoir, (1590–1633) and of Ernestine de Witthem, Countess van Walhain (before 1588–1649), who had become the widow of Eugene Perrenot de Granvelle dit d'Oiselet, Prince de Cantecroix (1615-1637), earlier that year; and had three children;

- Francis de Lorraine (23 August 1637 – 12 June 1638); died in infancy
- Anne de Lorraine (23 August 1639 – 19 February 1720), married her cousin François Marie de Lorraine (1624–1694), Prince de Lillebonne in 1660, had issue;
- Charles Henri de Lorraine (1649–1723), Prince of Vaudémont and of Commercy.

His marriage to Béatrice de Cusance was not deemed valid by the Roman Catholic church, which had not authorised his divorce from Nicole. The couple separated in April 1642 following his excommunication, which was the consequence of his second marriage; it was also the month in which she bore a son whom Charles recognised. More than 20 years later, on 20 May 1663, Charles married Béatrice de Cusance a second time, to allow legitimation of their children. She died two weeks after this second marriage.

Charles married a fourth time at the age of 61. The bride was Countess Marie Louise of Aspremont-Lynden (1652–1692), the 18-year-old daughter of Charles of Aspremont-Lynden, Count of Reckheim (1590-1671) and his wife, Marie Françoise de Mailly (1625-1702). They had no children and in 1679, a widow, she married Count Heinrich Franz von Mansfeld, Prince di Fondi, by whom she had two daughters.

== See also ==
- Dukes of Lorraine family tree

== Sources ==
- The Columbia Encyclopedia, Sixth Edition
- Michael O Siochru, God's Executioner: Oliver Cromwell and the Conquest of Ireland, Faber & Faber Ltd, London, 2008

Preceded by Nicole	Duke of Lorraine; 1625–1634	Succeeded by Nicholas II
Preceded by Nicholas II	Duke of Lorraine; 1661–1675	Succeeded by Charles V
