= Elisabeth of Lorraine, Electress of Bavaria =

Duchess

Elisabeth
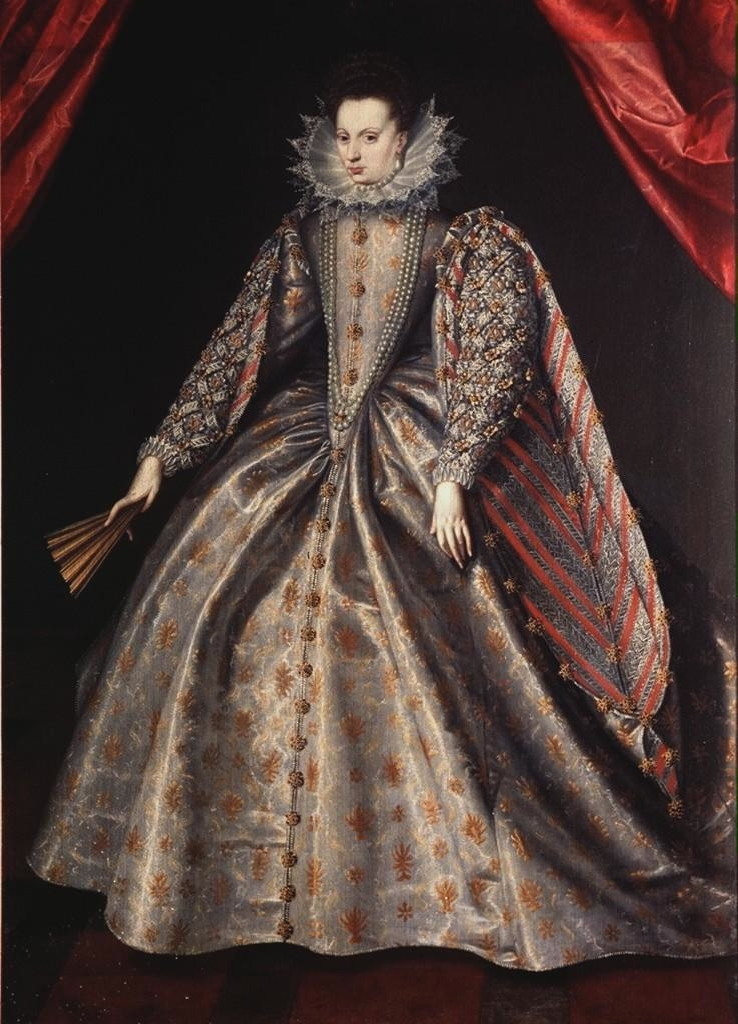
- Anonymous portrait, c. 1590–99, Uffizi Gallery

Electress consort of Bavaria
- Tenure: 25 February 1623 – 4 January 1635

Duchess consort of Bavaria
- Tenure: 1597 – 1623

Electress Palatine
- Tenure: 23 February 1623 – 4 January 1635
- Born: 9 October 1574
- Died: 4 January 1635 (aged 60)
- Spouse: Maximilian I, Elector of Bavaria (m. 1595)
- House: Lorraine
- Father: Charles III of Lorraine
- Mother: Claude of Valois
- Religion: Roman Catholic

Elisabeth of Lorraine (9 October 1574 – 4 January 1635), was a Duchess and an Electress consort of Bavaria by marriage to Maximilian I, Elector of Bavaria.

== Life ==
Elisabeth was a daughter of Charles III, Duke of Lorraine, through his marriage to Claude of Valois.

On 9 February 1595, in Nancy, she married her cousin Maximilian I, Elector of Bavaria. The marriage was arranged to confirm the alliance between the two Catholic dynasties of Bavaria and Lorraine and give Bavaria connections to France and Tuscany, her sister being married to the Grand Duke of Tuscany. Her spouse came to power in Bavaria in 1597.

The marriage was childless due to Elisabeth's sterility, which was a cause of suffering. Her relationship to her spouse was described as good and harmonious despite fertility issues, which caused an uproar and succession crisis.

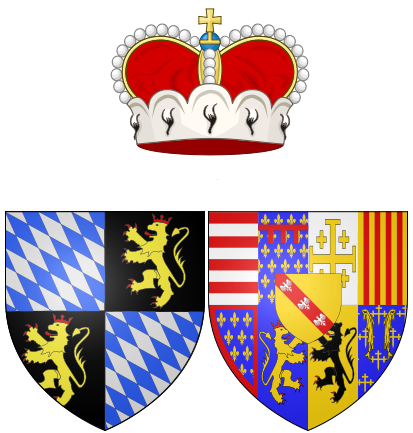
Coat of arms of Elisabeth as Electress of Bavaria

Elisabeth is described as a very devout Catholic, who devoted a lot of her time to her religious duties, and became known for her ascetic life style. As newly married, she was seen as vivid and jolly, but she became more melancholic and depressive by age. Maximilian gave no political influence or tasks to Elisabeth, but she spent a great deal of effort on charity.

She died after a long period of illness. Because her marriage had not resulted in any issue, Maximilian married again only a few months after her death, eventually siring the long awaited heir to his Electorate.

== Ancestry ==
Ancestors of Elisabeth of Lorraine, Electress of Bavaria

16. René II, Duke of Lorraine
8. Antoine, Duke of Lorraine
17. Philippa of Guelders
4. Francis I, Duke of Lorraine
18. Gilbert, Count of Montpensier
9. Renée de Bourbon
19. Clara Gonzaga
2. Charles III, Duke of Lorraine
20. John, King of Denmark
10. Christian II of Denmark
21. Christina of Saxony
5. Princess Christina of Denmark
22. Philip I of Castile
11. Archduchess Isabella of Austria
23. Joanna the Mad of Castile
1. Elisabeth of Lorraine
24. Charles, Count of Angoulême
12. Francis I of France
25.Princess Louise of Savoy
6. Henry II of France
26. Louis XII of France
13. Claude of France
27. Anne of Brittany
3. Claude of Valois
28. Piero the Unfortunate
14. Lorenzo II de' Medici, Duke of Urbino
29. Alfonsina Orsini
7. Catherine de' Medici
30. John III, Count of Auvergne
15. Madeleine de La Tour d'Auvergne
31. Jeanne de Bourbon-Vendome

== See also ==
- Dukes of Lorraine family tree

Elisabeth of Lorraine, Electress of Bavaria House of Lorraine Born: 9 October 1574 Died: 4 January 1635
Royal titles
Preceded by Renata of Lorraine	Electress consort of Bavaria; 1597–1635	Succeeded by Maria Anna of Austria
Preceded by Elizabeth Stuart	Electress Palatine; 1623–1635	Succeeded by Maria Anna of Austria
