= Dorothea of Lorraine =

- Duchess of Brunswick-Lüneburg
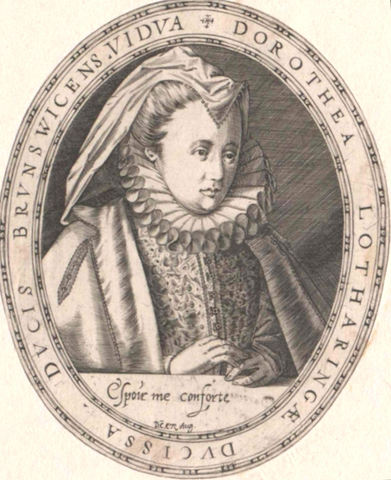
- Engraving by Dominicus Custos
- Born: 24 May 1545; Château de Deneuvre, Deneuvre, Lorraine
- Died: 2 June 1621 (aged 76); Nancy, Lorraine
- Spouse: Eric II, Duke of Brunswick-Lüneburg; Marc de Rye, Marquis de Varambon
- House: Lorraine
- Father: Francis I, Duke of Lorraine
- Mother: Christina of Denmark

Dorothea of Lorraine or Dorothée de Lorraine (24 May 1545 – 2 June 1621), was by birth a member of the House of Lorraine and by marriage to Eric II, Duke of Brunswick-Lüneburg, Duchess of Brunswick-Lüneburg-Calenburg.

Born at the Château de Deneuvre, she was the third child and second daughter of Francis I, Duke of Lorraine and Christina of Denmark. Her paternal grandparents were Antoine, Duke of Lorraine and Renée of Bourbon-Montpensier and her maternal grandparents were Christian II of Denmark and Isabella of Austria.

== Life ==
Dorothea was named after her maternal aunt and she was born crippled or lame, which was attributed to the stress of her mother during the pregnancy (her father died one month after her birth, on 12 June 1545). During the visit of her maternal aunt and uncle in 1551, she and her sister were described:

"both lovely little maidens, only that the youngest is lame and cannot walk, for which cause her uncle and aunt embraced her the more tenderly."

Dorothea was described as having a certain charm and gaiety which made her brother and his family devoted to her. She helped her brother design the terraced gardens, adorned with fountains and orangeries, in the precincts of the ducal palace: he named a bell in the new clock-tower of Nancy from 1577 after her. She attended the wedding between King Henry III of France and Louise of Lorraine in Reims in 1573.

On 26 November 1575 at Nancy, she married Eric II, Duke of Brunswick-Lüneburg, an old friend of her family and a recent widower from an unfortunate marriage with Sidonie of Saxony. As a Morgengabe (morning gift), Dorothea received the castle in Uslar, which was renamed Freudental Castle on this occasion, as well as the usufruct from the County of Clermont. In 1576, he also granted her Erichsburg as a personal estate. The marriage was childless; Dorothea's two pregnancies ended in miscarriages.

In 1578, she joined Eric on his war expedition to support Juan d'Austria in Namur. The same year, Eric was employed by Philip of Spain in his attempt to conquer Portugal. Dorothea lived at the Spanish court, and became a personal friend of the King. He made instructions that certain amounts of her spouse's salary be given to her rather than to him, granted her personal gifts, a patent for working certain gold-mines, and the succession of her spouse to Tortona, the dower estate of her mother in Italy, upon her mother's death.

In 1582, Dorothea persuaded Archbishop Granvelle to recommend Eric to the post of Viceroy of Naples. However, he died in 1584. After the death of Eric, Dorothea joined her mother in Tortona. In 1589, she met her niece Christina of Lorraine in Lyon and escorted her to her marriage with the Grand Duke of Tuscany in Marseilles.

In 1597 she married secondly with a French noble, Marc de Rye de la Palud, Marquis de Varambon, Comte de la Roche et de Villersexel, who died one year later, in December 1598. In 1608, she returned to Lorraine to nurse her brother on his deathbed. She remained in Lorraine the rest of her life, dying aged 76 in 1621. She was buried in the Église des Cordeliers, Nancy.
