= Catherine of Lorraine (born 1573) =

Abbess of Remiremont (1573–1648)

- Abbess of Remiremont
- Portrait c. 1598–99
- Born: 3 November 1573; Ducal Palace of Nancy, France
- Died: 7 March 1648 (aged 74); Paris, France
- House: House of Lorraine
- Father: Charles III, Duke of Lorraine
- Mother: Claude of France

Catherine of Lorraine (3 November 1573 – 7 March 1648) was the Abbess of Remiremont.

== Biography ==
Catherine was the seventh child and fourth daughter of Charles III, Duke of Lorraine, and his wife Claude, daughter of Henry II of France and Catherine de' Medici. Her mother died in childbirth in 1575 when Catherine was a year and a half. She was born at the Ducal Palace of Lorraine in Nancy, capital of the Duchy of Lorraine.

Catherine was devoted to religion and even went as far to ignore an alliance with the future Holy Roman Emperor, Ferdinand II.

In 1602 Catherine became the Coadjutrice of the Abbey. In 1612 she became the Abbess of the prestigious Remiremont Abbey, a Benedictine abbey near Remiremont, Vosges, France. The previous abbess, Elizabeth of Salm, had resigned specifically for Catherine to take the post.

Remiremont was one of the most important, illustrious and aristocratic Abbey in France and was closely associated with the House of Lorraine. She later became the coadjutor to her niece, Margaret. Margaret had lost her mother in 1627 and went to live with Catherine at Remiremont. The young Marguerite was later the Duchess of Orléans as wife Gaston, scandalous brother of Louis XIII. Margaret, as a result of marrying Gaston without royal permission, was sent into exile with her husband in Brussels.

In 1638 the troops of Turenne occupied Remiremont for a month. The following year the Princess obtained the neutrality of Vosges (for Épinal, Remiremont, Bruyère, St Dié, Arches) for the rest of the Thirty Years War.

She died in a Lorraine which had been ravaged by the Thirty Years war. At her death, the abbey was given to her great niece Élisabeth Marguerite d'Orléans who ruled the abbey under a regency of her parents, the Duke and Duchess of Orléans.

Remiremont was ruled by two more Lorraine princesses; Élisabeth Charlotte (1700–1711) and then Anne Charlotte (1714–1773).

== Ancestry ==
Ancestors of Catherine of Lorraine (born 1573)

8. Antoine, Duke of Lorraine
4. Francis I, Duke of Lorraine
9. Renée de Bourbon
2. Charles III, Duke of Lorraine
10. Christian II of Denmark
5. Princess Christina of Denmark
11. Archduchess Isabella of Austria
1. Princess Catherine of Lorraine
12. Francis I of France
6. Henry II of France
13. Princess Claude of France
3. Princess Claude of France
14. Lorenzo II de' Medici, Duke of Urbino
7. Catherine de' Medici
15. Madeleine de La Tour d'Auvergne

== References and notes ==
- Jacqueline Carolus-Currien, Pauvres duchesses, Metz, Édition serpenoise, 2007.
