= Nicolas, Duke of Mercœur =

Nicolas
- Duke of Mercœur
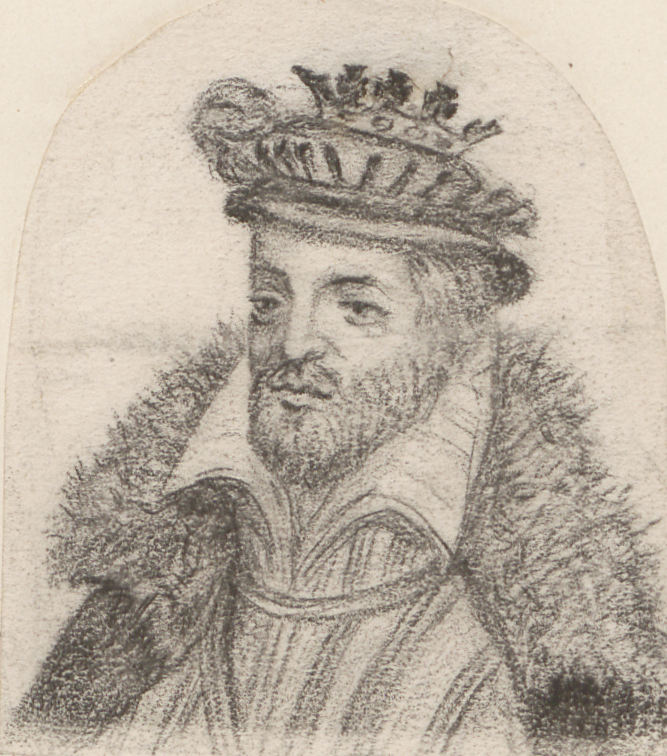
- Born: 16 October 1524; Bar-le-Duc, France
- Died: 23 January 1577 (aged 52)
- Spouse: Marguerite d'Egmont; Joanna of Savoy; Catherine of Lorraine
- Issue: Louise, Queen of France and Poland; Philippe Emmanuel, Duke of Mercœur; Charles, Cardinal of Vaudémont; Marguerite, Duchess of Joyeuse and Piney; François, Marquis of Chaussin; Henri, Marquis de Mouy and Count of Chaligny; Antoine, Bishop of Toul; Eric, Bishop of Verdun
Names
- French: Nicolas de Lorraine
- House: House of Lorraine
- Father: Antoine, Duke of Lorraine
- Mother: Renée de Bourbon

Nicolas of Lorraine, Duke of Mercœur (16 October 1524 – 23 January 1577), was the second son of Antoine, Duke of Lorraine, and Renée de Bourbon.

== Life ==
Nicolas was originally destined for an ecclesiastical career, being made bishop of Metz in 1543 and of Verdun in 1544. In June 1545, he became joint "tutor and administrator" for his nephew, Charles III, Duke of Lorraine, with his sister-in-law Christina of Denmark. However, the Estates of Lorraine, in November 1545, removed him in favor of Christina as sole regent. He opposed her pro-Imperial policies. Resigning his dioceses in 1548 in favor of his uncle Jean, Cardinal of Lorraine, he took the title Count of Vaudémont.

After seizure of the Three Bishoprics in 1552 by Henry II of France, he was re-appointed as sole regent for his nephew, a position he retained until 1559.

Nomeny was detached from the Bishopric of Metz in 1551 and given to him as a margraviate by Maximilian II, Holy Roman Emperor, in 1567, in right of which he was recognized as an independent, hereditary Prince of the Empire (the House of Lorraine would obtain a full vote in the Imperial Diet in 1736 for Nomeny in compensation for cession of the Duchy of Lorraine to France—in addition to acquisition of the Grand Duchy of Tuscany).

In France, his mother's barony of Mercœur was likewise elevated to the status of a princedom (though not independent of the French crown) in 1563, and raised to a ducal peerage in 1569. He was also created a knight of the Order of Saint Esprit.

== Marriages ==
Nicolas married three times. His first marriage, on 1 May 1549 in Brussels, was to Countess Marguerite d'Egmont (1517 – 10 March 1554, Bar-le-Duc), daughter of Count Jean IV of Egmont. They had:

1. Marguerite of Lorraine (b. 9 February 1550), died at birth
2. Catherine of Lorraine (b. 26 February 1551, Nomeny), died at birth
3. Henri of Lorraine (b. 9 April 1552, Nomeny) Count of Chaligny, died at birth
4. Louise of Lorraine (30 April 1553, Nomeny – 29 January 1601, Château de Moulins), married on 13 February 1575, at Reims, Henry III of France.

His second marriage was on 24 February 1555 at Fontainebleau, to Princess Joanna of Savoy-Nemours (1532–1568), daughter of Philippe, Duke of Nemours. By this marriage they had:

1. Philippe Emmanuel of Lorraine, Duke of Mercœur (1558–1602).
2. Charles de Lorraine (20 April 1561, Nomeny – 29 October 1587, Paris), known as the Cardinal de Vaudémont, Bishop of Toul and of Verdun.
3. Jean of Lorraine (b. 14 September 1563, Château de Deneuvre), died at birth
4. Marguerite of Lorraine (14 May 1564, Nomeny – 20 September 1625), married on 24 September 1581 in Paris Anne, Duke of Joyeuse (1561–1587), married on 31 May 1599 François de Luxemburg, Duke of Piney (d. 1613).
5. Claude of Lorraine (b. 12 April 1566, Nomeny), died at birth
6. François of Lorraine (15 September 1567 – 15 September 1596, Châtel-sur-Moselle), Marquis of Chaussin, died unmarried, without issue.

His third marriage was on 11 May 1569 at Reims, to Princess Catherine of Lorraine-Aumale (1550–1606), daughter of Claude, Duke of Aumale. They had:

1. Henri of Lorraine (31 July 1570, Nancy – 26 October 1600, Vienna), Marquis of Mouy and Count of Chaligny, married on 19 September 1585 Claude de Mouy.
2. Christine of Lorraine (b. 24 September 1571, Château de Koeurs), died at birth
3. Antoine of Lorraine (27 August 1572 – 15 January 1587, Mainz), Abbot of Beaulieu and Bishop of Toul
4. Louise of Lorraine (b. 27 March 1575, Nancy), died at birth
5. Eric of Lorraine (14 March 1576 – 27 April 1623), Bishop of Verdun.

== Sources ==
- de Busbecq, Ogier Ghislain (1961). Letters of Ogier Ghislain de Busbecq to the Holy Roman Emperor Maximilian II. Translated by Jones, Robert Epes; Weber, Bernerd Clarke. Bookman Associates.
- Carroll, Stuart (2009). Martyrs and Murderers: The Guise Family and the Making of Europe. Oxford University Press.
- Gebhardt, Bruno (1973). Handbuch der Deutschen Geschichte, 9, Auflage (in German). Vol. 2. Ernst Ketler Verlag.
- George, Hereford Brooke (1875). Genealogical Tables Illustrative of Modern History. Oxford at the Clarendon Press.
- Knecht, Robert J. (1998). Catherine de'Medici. Pearson Education Limited.
- Levantal, Christophe (1996). Les ducs et pairs et duchés-pairies laïques à l'époque moderne Paris (in French). Maisonneuve & Larose.
- Oresko, Robert (2004). "Maria Giovanna Basttista of Savoy-Nemours (1644-1724): Daughter, Consort, and Regent of Savoy". In Orr, Clarissa Campbell (ed.). Queenship in Europe 1660-1815: The Role of the Consort. Cambridge University Press. ISBN 9780521814225.
- Pussot, Jean (2008). Simiz, Stefano; Buridant, Jérôme (eds.). Journalier de Jean Pussot maître-charpentier à Reims (1568-1626). Presses Universitaires di Septentrion. ISBN 9782859399993.
- Yates, Frances A. (1975). Astraea. Vol. V. Routledge.
- Zeller, Gaston (1926). La Réunion de Metz à la France (1552–1648). Vol. 1. Les Presses Universitaires de France.

| Preceded by elevated from Barony | Prince of Mercœur; 1563–1569 | Succeeded by elevated to Duke |
| Preceded by Antoine | Count of Vaudémont; 1548–1577; With: Charles III | Succeeded by Charles III |
| Preceded by — | Margrave of Nomeny; 1567–1577 | Succeeded by Philippe Emmanuel |
| Preceded by elevated from Princedom | Duke of Mercœur; 1569–1577 | Succeeded by Philippe Emmanuel |
