= Charles de Lorraine de Vaudémont =

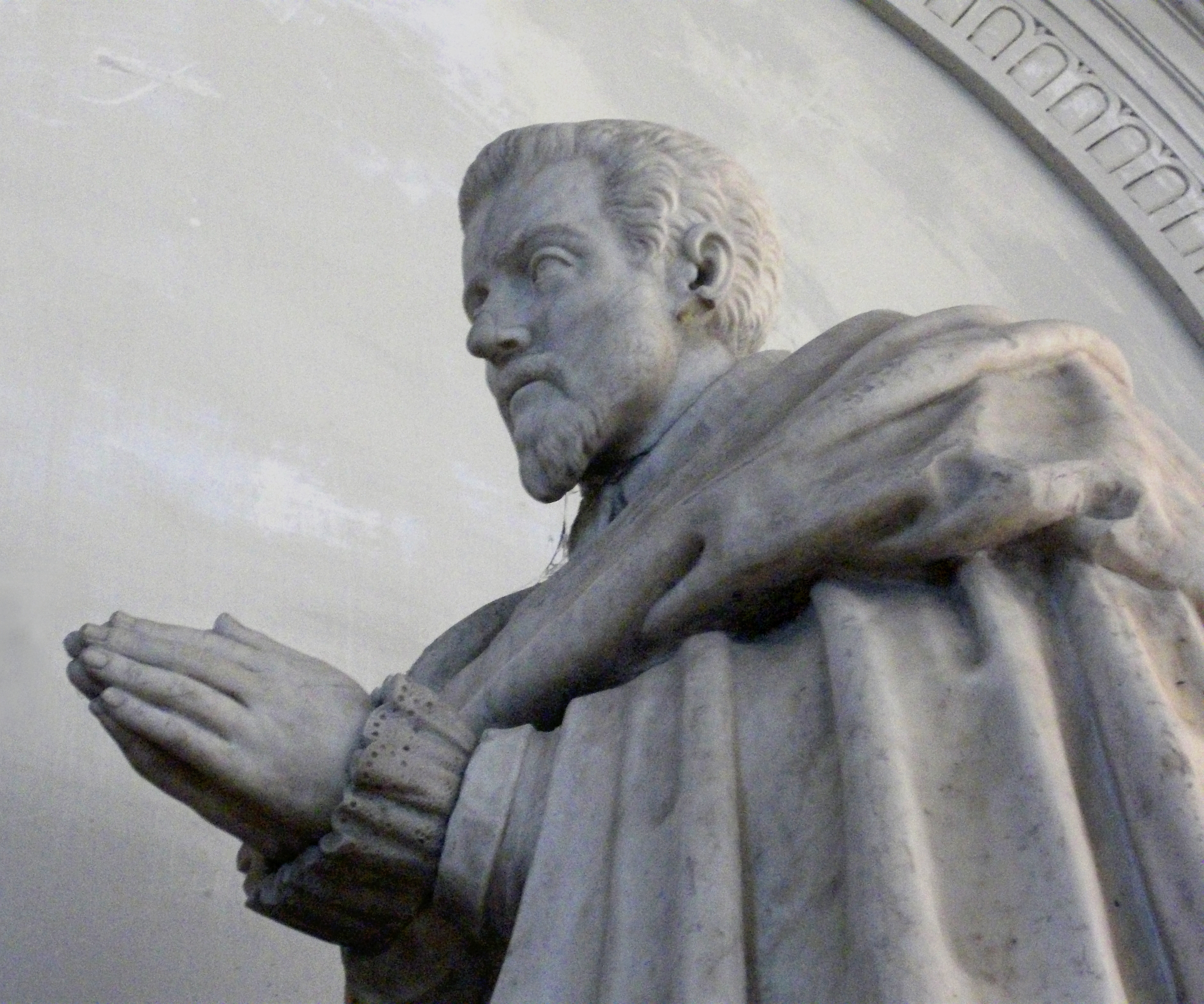
Funerary monument in the Franciscan church in Nancy, France.

Charles de Lorraine de Vaudémont (20 April 1561–30 October 1587) was a French Roman Catholic cardinal.

== Biography ==
Charles de Lorraine de Vaudémont was born in Nomeny on 20 April 1561, the son of Nicolas, Duke of Mercœur and his wife Margaret of Egmont. He was the younger brother of Louise of Lorraine and the uncle of Cardinal Charles de Lorraine-Vaudémont.

He studied Christian theology at the Jesuit University of Pont-à-Mousson. When his sister married Henry III of France on 13 February 1575, he was briefly called to court, but soon returned to Pont-à-Mousson to resume his studies. He was the commendatory abbot of Moissac Abbey from 1571 to 1580.

Pope Gregory XIII made him a cardinal deacon in the consistory of 21 February 1578. On 9 March 1580 he became administrator of the Diocese of Toul, with the understanding that he would become its bishop upon reaching the canonical age of 27. He administered the diocese until his death at age 26. In 1583, he became a Commander of the Order of the Holy Spirit. He was elected Bishop of Verdun on 7 January 1585.

He did not participate in the papal conclave of 1585 that elected Pope Sixtus V. Following the papal conclave, on 24 June 1585, he received the red hat and the deaconry of Santa Maria in Domnica.

On 25 November 1586 he was ordained a priest and consecrated a bishop in Verdun Cathedral. He opted for the order of cardinal priests on 20 April 1587, taking the titular church of Trinità dei Monti.

He died in Paris on 30 October 1587. He was buried in the Franciscan monastery in Nancy, France.
