= Antoine, Duke of Lorraine =

Duke of Lorraine and Bar from 1508 to 1544

Antoine
- Portrait by Hans Holbein the Younger, 1543

Duke of Lorraine and Bar
- Reign: 10 December 1508 – 14 June 1544
- Predecessor: René II
- Successor: Francis I
- Born: 4 June 1489; Bar-le-Duc, Duchy of Bar, Kingdom of France
- Died: 14 June 1544 (aged 55); Bar-le-Duc, Duchy of Bar, Kingdom of France
- Spouse: Renée de Bourbon (m. 1515; died 1539)
- Issue: Francis I, Duke of Lorraine; Nicholas, Duke of Mercœur; Anna, Princess of Orange
- House: Lorraine
- Father: René II, Duke of Lorraine
- Mother: Philippa of Guelders

Antoine (4 June 1489 – 14 June 1544), known as the Good, was Duke of Lorraine from 1508 until his death in 1544. Raised at the French court, Antoine would campaign in Italy twice: once under Louis XII and the other with Francis I. During the German Peasants' War, he would defeat two armies while retaking Saverne and Sélestat. Antoine succeeded in freeing Lorraine from the Holy Roman Empire with the Treaty of Nuremberg of 1542. In 1544, while Antoine suffered from an illness, the Duchy of Lorraine was invaded by Emperor Charles V's army on their way to attack France. Fleeing the Imperial armies, Antoine was taken to Bar-le-Duc where he died.

== Biography ==
Antoine was born on 4 June 1489 at Bar-le-Duc, the son of René II, Duke of Lorraine, and Philippa of Guelders. He spent seven years at the court of King Louis XII together with his brother Claude, and became friends with the Duke of Angoulême, the future King Francis I. After the death of his father, Antoine succeeded him as duke of Lorraine in December 1508. In 1530, a transaction between Antoine and his brother, divided the family possessions, with Antoine getting the duchies of Lorraine and Bar while Claude would receive the duchy of Guise.

In 1509 Antoine entrusted the reins of the Duchy to his mother and Hugues des Hazards, bishop of Toul, and followed Louis XII in his campaign in northern Italy, where he took part in the Battle of Agnadello of that year. After Louis's death, he went back to Italy and under Francis I, participating in the battle of Marignano (13–14 September 1515). However, called back home by problems in Lorraine, he was absent at the decisive battle of Pavia (1525), in which Francis was taken prisoner and his brother François, count of Lambesc, was killed.

== Peasant war ==
In Lorraine, Antoine had to face the spreading of Protestant Reformation, against which he published an edict on 26 December 1523. The situation worsened the following year, when a rebellion, known as German Peasants' War, broke out in Alsace. The insurrectionists captured Saverne and tried to conquer Saint-Dié, while the peasants of Bitscherland also rebelled in May 1525. Antoine launched an expedition in which he massacred a peasant army at Saverne on 16 May and on 20 May he decisively defeated another peasant army near Sélestat.

== Duchy legal status ==
Despite remaining neutral in the wars between France and the Holy Roman Empire, Antoine sent his son Francis to the French court and by 1527 was attempting to marry him to Anne of Cleves. In an effort to improve his relations with German lords, Antoine sent a few hundred soldiers to fight against the Ottomans at the Siege of Vienna in 1529. Antoine dispatched legal envoys to the Imperial diet, in 1532, seeking clarification of the duchy of Lorraine's legal status within the Holy Roman Empire to no avail.

In 1538, Antoine claimed the titles of Duke of Guelders and Count of Zutphen upon the death of Charles of Egmond, but was unable to gain possession of them. He married his heir, Francis to Christina of Denmark, niece of Charles V, in 1541, and with the Treaty of Nuremberg (26 August 1542), Antoine obtained from Charles V the independence of the Duchy of Lorraine. He interceded at the start of Francis and Charles's war in 1542 as a peace envoy, visiting Charles in person, but due to gout sent his heir to Francis. In fact, Antoine asked his niece, Mary of Guise, to send him a Scottish hackney horse which he hoped would be easier to ride with his gout.

== Death and aftermath ==
In May 1544, Charles V's army marched into Lorraine as part of a plan to invade France, while Henry VIII of England attacked northern France from Calais. Weakened by an illness, Antoine was unable to respond, and was taken to Bar-le-Duc where he died on 14 June 1544.

Antoine's oldest son Francis succeeded him as Duke of Lorraine and ruled for only one year, dying in 1545. His son, Antoine's grandson, Charles III of Lorraine became duke with his mother, Christina of Denmark, as regent. By 1552, King Henry II of France visited Charles and it was decided that Charles would be educated at the French court and that the regency of Lorraine would fall to his uncle, Nicolas, Duke of Mercœur. In 1559, the House of Guise, fearing the influence of the Holy Roman Empire over Lorraine, orchestrated Charles's marriage to Claude of France, daughter of Henry II of France and Catherine de' Medici.

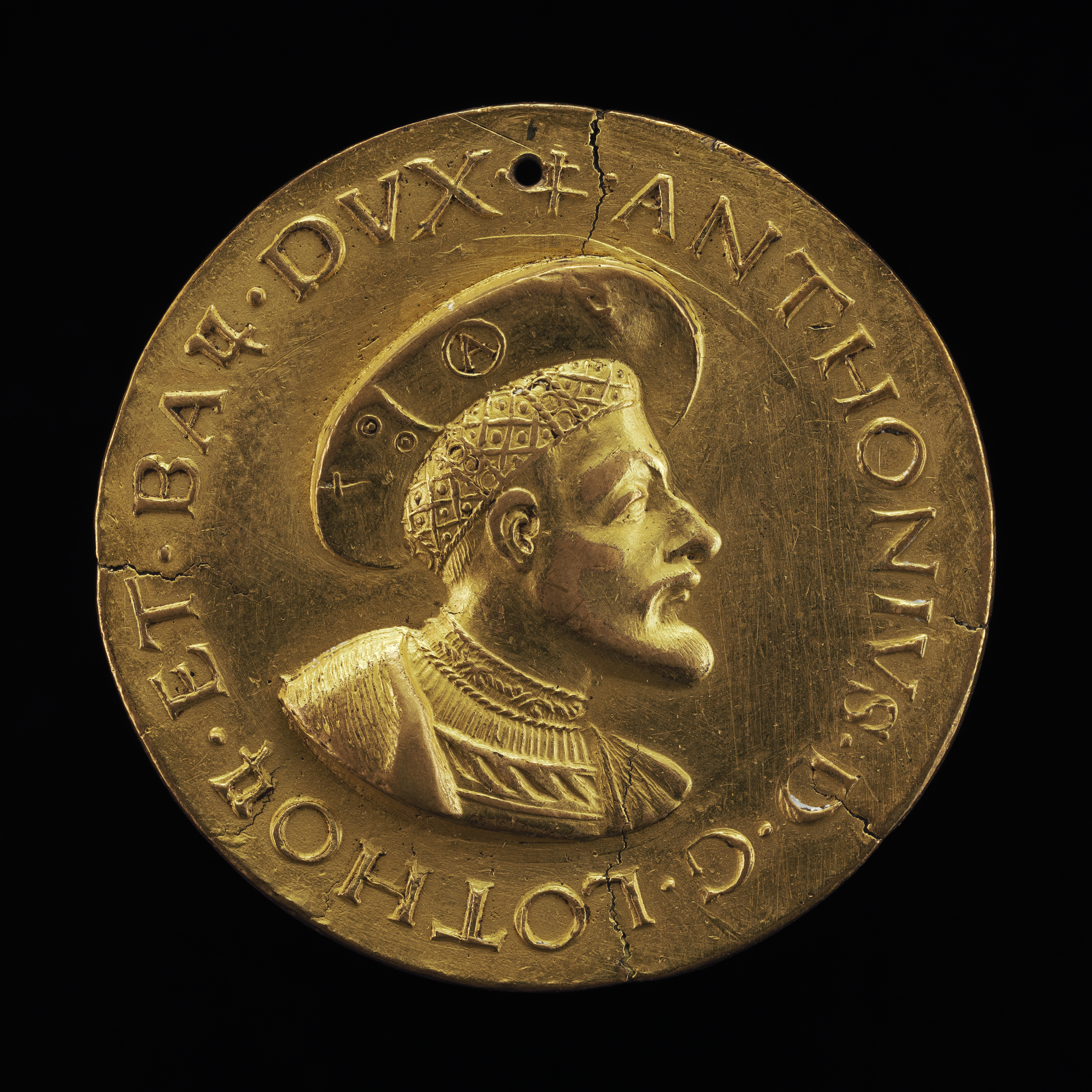
Antoine, 1489–1544, Duke of Lorraine and Bar 1508

== Family ==
On 26 June 1515, he married Renée of Bourbon, daughter of Gilbert de Bourbon, Count of Montpensier, and Clara Gonzaga.

They had:

- Francis I, Duke of Lorraine (1517–1545), married Christina of Denmark
- Nicholas, Duke of Mercœur (1524–1577)
- Anna (1522–1568), married firstly René of Châlon, Prince of Orange, and secondly Philip II, Duke of Aerschot (1496–1549)

== See also ==
- Dukes of Lorraine family tree

== Sources ==
- Bercé, Yves Marie (1987). Revolt and Revolution in Early Modern Europe: An Essay on the History of Political Violence. Translated by Bergin, Joseph. Manchester University Press. ISBN 978-0719019678.
- Bietenholz, Peter G. (2003). "Antoine, duke of Lorraine". In Bietenholz, Peter G.; Deutscher, Thomas Brian (eds.). Contemporaries of Erasmus: A Biographical Register of the Renaissance and Reformation. Vol. A–Z. University of Toronto Press. ISBN 978-0802025074.
- Blickle, Peter (1981). The Revolution of 1525: The German Peasants War from a New Perspective. Translated by Brady, Thomas A. Jr; Midelfort, H. C. Johns Hopkins University Press. ISBN 978-0801824722.
- Bogdan, Henry (2013). La Lorraine des ducs (in French). Tempus. ISBN 978-2262042752.
- Braye, Lucien (1924). René de Chalon et le mausolée du Cœur. Imprimerie Contant-Laguerre.
- Copenhaver, Brian P. (1978). Symphorien Champier and the Reception of the Occultist Tradition in Renaissance France. Mouton Publisher. ISBN 978-9027976475.
- Carroll, Stuart (2009). Martyrs and Murderers: The Guise Family and the Making of Europe. Oxford University Press. ISBN 978-0199229079.
- von Greyerz, Kaspar (1980). The Late City Reformation in Germany: the case of Colmar, 1522-1628. Steiner. ISBN 978-3515029971.
- Knecht, R.J. (1999). Catherine de' Medici (2nd ed.). Longman.
- Lipp, Charles T. (2011). Noble Strategies in an Early Modern Small State: The Mahuet of Lorraine. University of Rochester Press. ISBN 978-1580463966.
- Monter, E. William (2007). A Bewitched Duchy: Lorraine and Its Dukes, 1477–1736. Librairie Droz. ISBN 978-2600011655.
- Tucker, Spencer C., ed. (2010). "May 1544: Western Europe: France". A Global Chronology of Conflict: From the Ancient World to the Modern Middle East. ABC-CLIO. ISBN 978-1851096671.
- Ward, Adolphus William; Prothero, G.W.; Leathes, Stanley, eds. (1911). The Cambridge Modern History. Vol. 13. The Macmillan Co.
- Warnicke, Retha M. (2000). The Marrying of Anne of Cleves: Royal Protocol in Early Modern England. Cambridge University Press. ISBN 978-0521770378.
- Wood, Marguerite, ed. (1923). Balcarres Papers. Vol. 1. SHS. ISBN 978-1332183470.

Regnal titles
Preceded by René II	Duke of Lorraine and Bar; Marquis of Pont-à-Mousson; 1508–1544	Succeeded by Francis I
