= Elizabeth of Salm =

French abbess

Elisabeth zu Salm (1570–1611), was a German-Roman monarch as Princess Abbess of the Imperial Remiremont Abbey in France.

She was the daughter of Friedrich I zu Salm-Neuweiler, Wild- und Rheingraf in Dhaun (1561–1610), and his wife Franziska Gräfin von Salm (died in 1587). She became abbess in 1602. During her reign, the copper mines in Thillot reached its maximum production. She resigned in favor of Catherine de Lorraine in 1611. She received a large pension, but died the same year.
