= Anna of Lorraine =

Princess of the House of Lorraine

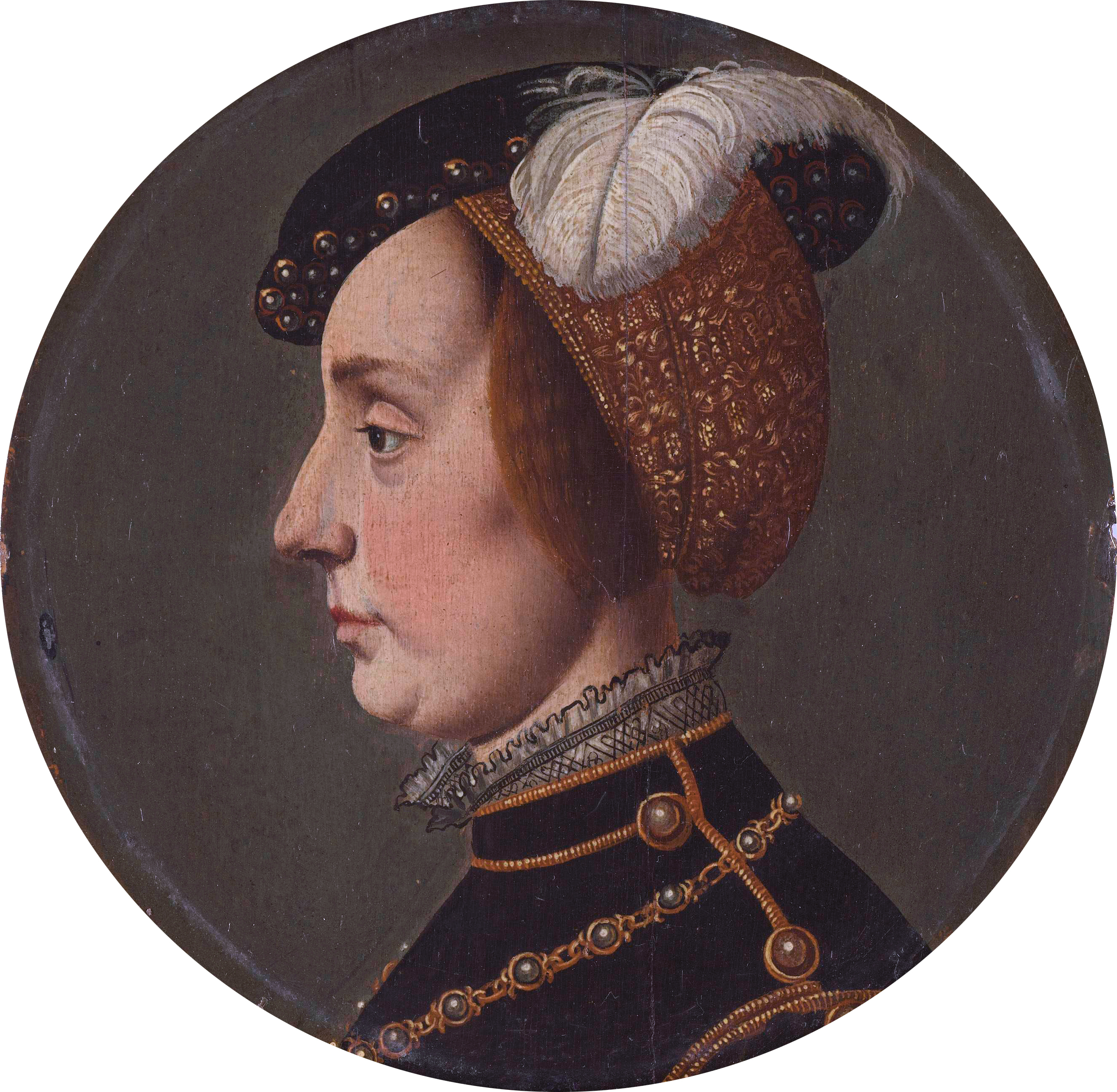
- Portrait by Jan van Scorel, 1542

Princess consort of Orange
- Tenure: 22 August 1540 – 15 July 1544
- Born: 25 July 1522
- Died: 15 May 1568 (aged 45); Diest
- Spouse: René of Chalon (m. 1540; died 1544) Philippe II de Croÿ (m. 1548; died 1549)
- Issue: Maria of Chalon; Charles Philippe de Croÿ
- House: Lorraine
- Father: Antoine, Duke of Lorraine
- Mother: Renée of Bourbon

Anna of Lorraine (25 July 1522 – 15 May 1568) was a princess of the House of Lorraine. She was Princess of Orange by her first marriage to René of Châlon, and Duchess of Aarschot by her second marriage to Philippe II of Croÿ.

== Life ==
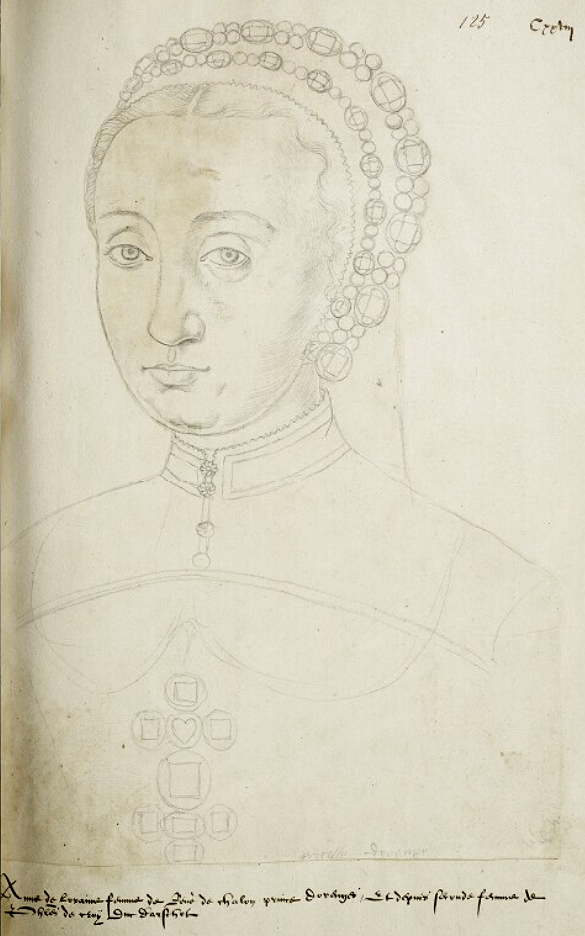
Posthumous drawing of Anna as a young woman by Jacques Le Boucq, c. 1570

Anna was the daughter of Antoine the Good, Duke of Lorraine, and Renée of Bourbon-Montpensier. Her maternal grandparents were Gilbert of Bourbon, Count of Montpensier, and Clara Gonzaga. Her brothers were Francis I, Duke of Lorraine and Nicolas, Duke of Mercœur.

By October 1537, Anna was suggested as potential bride to Henry VIII of England. Hans Holbein the Younger was dispatched to Lorraine to paint a portrait of Anna for the King. Henry chose Anne of Cleves as his new bride, and married her on 6 January 1540, only to have the marriage annulled on 12 July 1540. Henry swiftly remarried Catherine Howard on 28 July 1540, ruling out Anna of Lorraine as a potential bride.

Anna of Lorraine married René of Châlon, Prince of Orange on 22 August 1540 at Bar-le-Duc. They had a single daughter, Maria, born in 1544, who only lived three weeks and was buried in the Grote Kerk at Breda.

René died in 1544, and all of his lands were inherited by William the Silent, his cousin. Anna remarried to Philip II, Duke of Aarschot, on 9 July 1548. They had one son, Charles Philippe de Croÿ, born on 1 September 1549 in Brussels. He was the Prince of Croÿ and in 1580 married Diane de Dommartin (1550 – after 1635), Countess of Fontenoy-le-Château. He died on 25 November 1613 in Burgundy.

She died in Diest.

== Sources ==
- Bietenholz, Peter G.; Deutscher, Thomas Brian, eds. (1995). "Rene of Chalon". Contemporaries of Erasmus: A Biographical Register of the Renaissance and Reformation. Vol. 3. University of Toronto Press.
- Braye, Lucien (1924). René de Chalon et le mausolée du Cœur (in French). Imprimerie Contant-Laguerre.
- Scarisbrick, J. J. (1997). Henry VIII (2nd ed.). Yale University Press. ISBN 0-3000-7158-2.
