= Louise of Lorraine =

Queen of France from 1575 to 1589

- Duchess of Berry
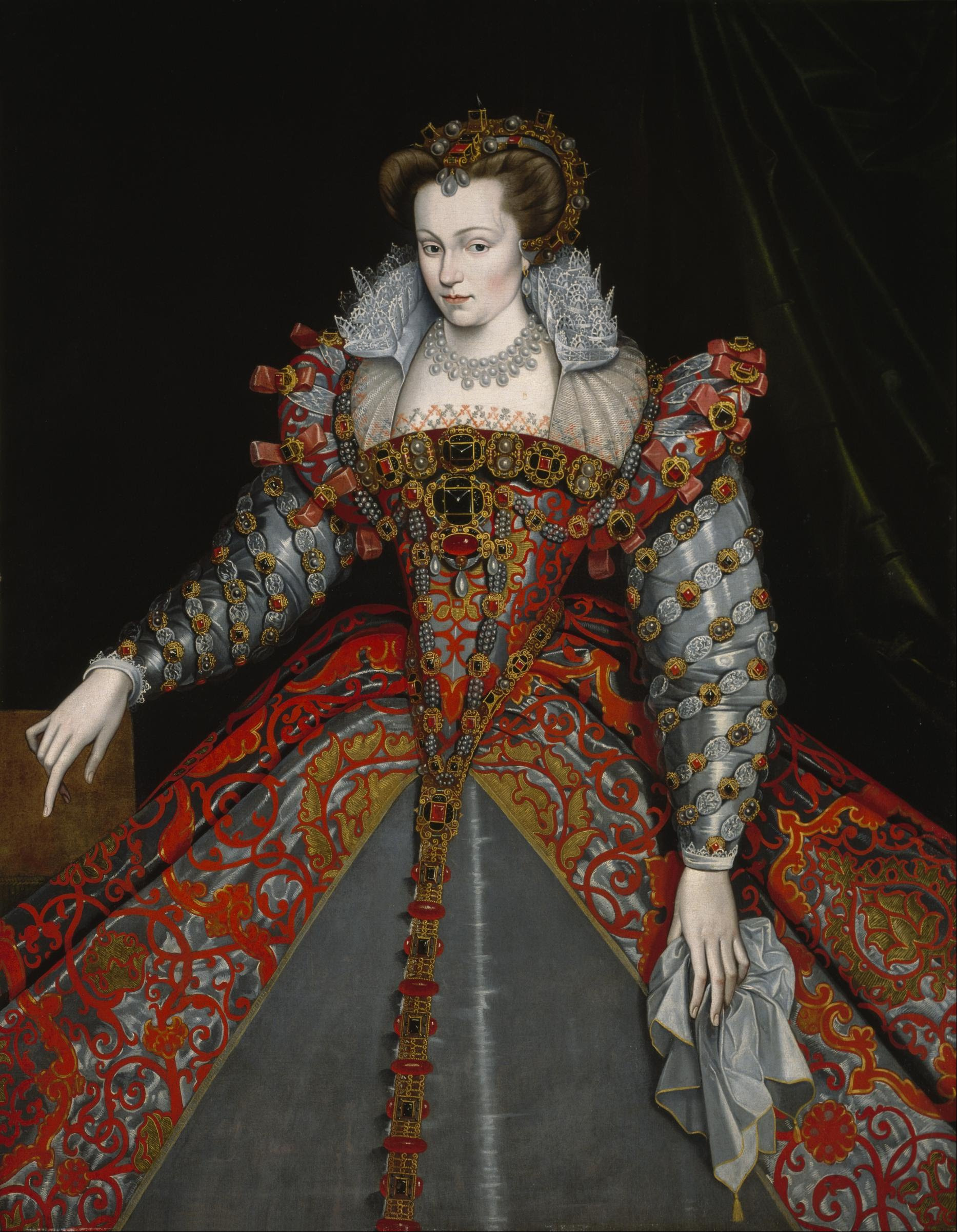
- Portrait in the manner of François Clouet in 1575

Queen consort of France
- Tenure: 15 February 1575 – 2 August 1589

Queen consort of Poland Grand Duchess consort of Lithuania
- Tenure: 15 February 1575 – 12 May 1575
- Born: 30 April 1553; Nomeny, Bar, France
- Died: 29 January 1601 (aged 47); Moulins, Allier, France
- Burial: 1817; Basilica of St Denis
- Spouse: Henry III of France (m. 1575; died 1589)
Names
- French: Louise de Lorraine; Louise de Lorraine-Mercoeur
- House: Lorraine
- Father: Nicholas, Duke of Mercœur
- Mother: Marguerite of Egmont

Louise of Lorraine (French: Louise de Lorraine-Vaudémont; 30 April 1553 – 29 January 1601) was Queen of France as the wife of King Henry III from their marriage on 15 February 1575 until his death on 2 August 1589. During the first three months of their marriage, she was also Queen of Poland and Grand Duchess of Lithuania. As a dowager queen, Louise held the title of Duchess of Berry.

== Life ==
=== Early life ===
Louise was born in Nomeny in the Duchy of Bar, she was the third daughter and youngest child born to Nicholas of Lorraine, Duke of Mercœur, and his first wife, Countess Margaret of Egmont (1517–1554). Louise was the only surviving child of her parents; her older siblings, two sisters and one brother, having died in infancy.

A few days after her birth Louise was baptized in the chapel at Nomeny, her godparents were Toussaint d´Hocedy, bishop of Toul and Louise de Stainville, comtesse de Salins and wife of Jean VIII, maréchal of Lorraine. Louise's mother died shortly before her first birthday in 1554, and her father quickly remarried, in 1555, to Princess Joanna of Savoy-Nemours (1532–1568), a second cousin to Henry II. Louise was given a classical education and her step-mother Joanna introduced her to Nancy's court at the age of ten. Her education was also overseen by a governess, Mme de Changy (or de Changi or de Champi), whose daughter Gillette de Changy became one of Louise´s companions. Later an additional governess Mlle de Montvert joined Louise´s household.

In 1568, at the age of 15 years, Louise was chosen to accompany her cousin Renata of Lorraine to Munich, where Renata was to marry William V, Duke of Bavaria.

The same year, Louise step-mother, Joanna of Savoy-Nemours died and Louise's father contracted his third and last marriage in 1569 with Princess Catherine of Lorraine-Aumale (1550–1606). Like her predecessor Joanna, Catherine was a close relative of the French royal family. Furthermore, Catherine was only three years older than her step-daughter and contrary to her predecessor seems to have treated Louise and her siblings with coldness and indifference; due to her unhappiness at both her marriage and having had to leave the French court.

At the age of 20, Louise was described as a "remarkably beautiful", and as a delicate tall, blonde girl with a white complexion, light brown eyes (veiled by a slight myopia), with a slender and refined silhouette. Her upbringing reportedly resulted in her personality being quiet, dutiful and pious.

=== Marriage plans ===
Louise was the subject of several marriage schemes which all failed, such as with the son of her godmother, Paul, count of Salm whom she is said to have held an affection for, but he was seen as unsuitable because his rank was inferior to that of Louise.

Then there was Henri de La Tour d'Auvergne, Duke of Bouillon, who is said to have declined, due to his uncle Guillaume de Montmorency-Thoré had expressed an interest in marrying Louise, but another reason was he saw it as political ploy to persuade Henri to ally with the Lorraines and alienate his Montmorency relatives.

François, Duke of Piney, a wealthy neighbour to the Lorraine ducal family also showed interest in marrying Louise in 1574, but lost out to Henry. In 1559 Louise´s cousin, Charles III, Duke of Lorraine, finally allowed to return to Lorraine had married Claude of Valois, sister of Henry III.This closer connection to the ruling house opened up for new marital prospects for the young Louise. Henry wrote a letter to François to explain that, as he had taken the duke's mistress, in return Henry offered his own mistress Renée de Rieux; an offer which François declined.

François would later marry Louise´s step-aunt (sister of her stepmother Catherine), Diane and after her death, he married Louise´s half-sister, Marguerite of Lorraine.

==== The marriage proposal of Henry III ====
Despite her cousins marriage to Henry's sister; Louise first saw Henry, Duke of Anjou, in the autumn of 1573, when he was on his way to Kraków, the capital of his new kingdom, Poland-Lithuania. She attracted Henry's interest during a celebration in honor of Henry's election as King of Poland-Lithuania.

In November of the same year Ogier Ghiselin de Busbecq, a diplomat in the employ of the Holy Roman Empire was reporting that; Some think that he [Henry] has set his heart on Monsieur de Vaudemont's daughter, who is a very handsome girl. Besides, the King is devoted to the House and party of Lorraine. and most anxious for its advancement. However, if he marries her he will cause tongues to wag, and give offence to those who from interest or jealousy are opposed to the party of Lorraine. Amongst these must be numbered Vendôme, Condé, and possibly Alençon himself, who will suspect-not without reason perhaps-that this marriage is only the thin end of the wedge.

Henry's mother Catherine is said to have dismayed at the news, not only with not being told about it but also that she saw as a mesalliance and worse; Louise was a member of the Lorraine family and related to the Guise.

Following the death of Charles IX of France, Henry of Poland-Lithuania succeeded him under the name of Henry III of France and returned clandestinely to France. Louise was with her family traveling to Reims for Henry's coronation, when Philippe Hurault de Cheverny and Michel Du Guast arrived to make Henry's marriage proposal.

== Queen ==
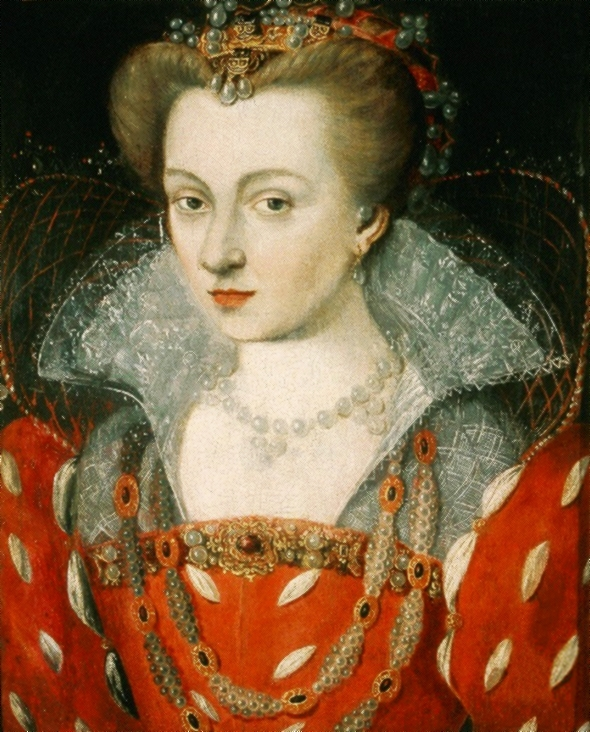
Portrait by Jean Rabel, ca. 1575.

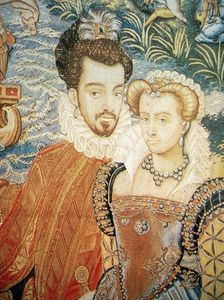
Louise and Henry III, detail of the Valois Tapestries, Florence, Uffizi Gallery.

Louise and Henry's wedding took place at the Cathedral of Reims in a ceremony celebrated by Charles, Cardinal de Bourbon two days after Henry's coronation, 15 February 1575. At the end of the month, the new Queen of France made her official entry to Paris with her husband.

Described as a "sweet and virtuous" young woman, Louise reportedly immediately and deeply fell in love with her husband, a feeling that never changed, despite the difficulties, tragedies, his infidelities and finally death. Being a pious and very simple person, she is said to have suffered terribly because of the conflicts between her family (the Houses of Guise and Lorraine and in particular between her brother Philippe Emmanuel, Duke of Mercœur) and her husband during the Wars of Religion.

Thanks to her calm personality, Louise duly accepted her husband's eccentricities: for example, Henry III loved to dress her in elegant dresses and made her into something of a fashion doll; she readily accepted this because she was happy for his attention. Coming from a simple upbringing in the country, Louise was given Jeanne de Dampierre as Première dame d'honneur to guide her in court protocol and manners, and Louise de la Béraudière as Dame d'atour to guide her in fashion and appearance to make her a Queen consort able to meet Henry III's idea of presentation, and they were both reported to have succeeded very well with their task. The King's interest in pampering Louise was used by his enemies against him; he was called "Hair-dresser to his Wife" in a libelous pamphlet.

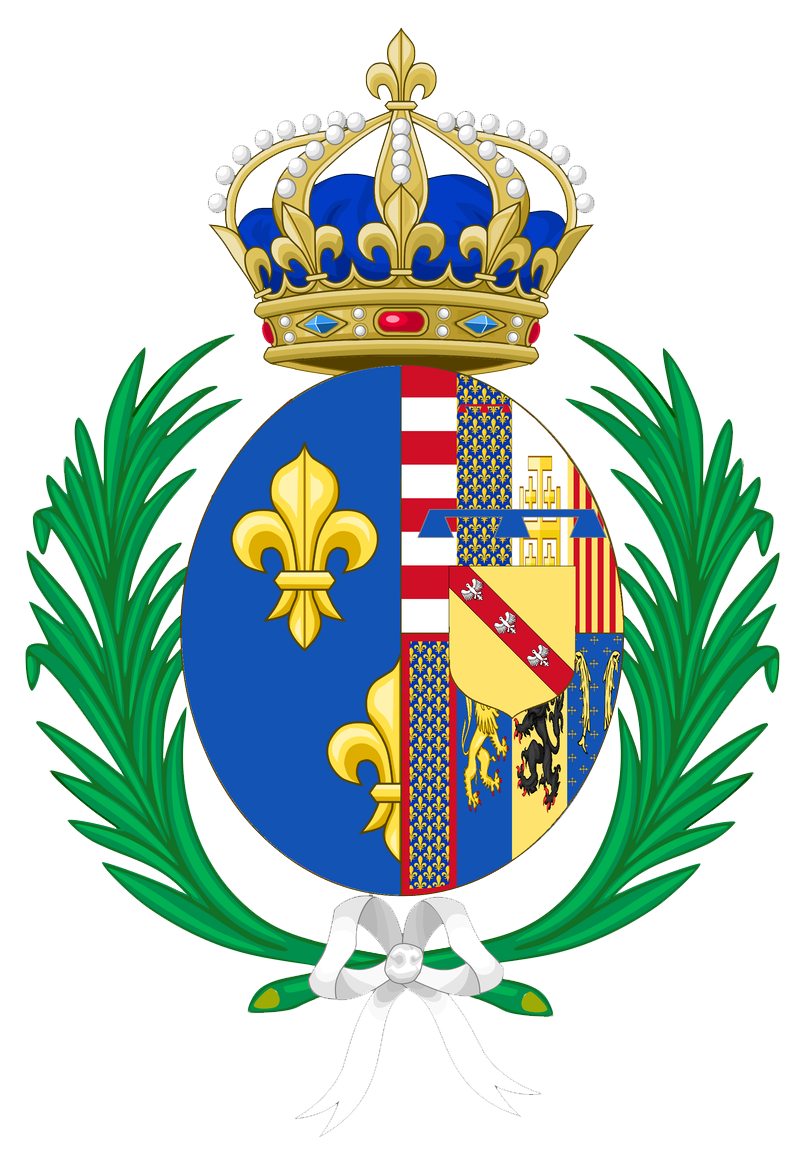
Arms of Louise as queen consort of France

The marriage did not produce children — apparently Louise was pregnant at the beginning of her marriage, but had a miscarriage in May 1575; however this is an unconfirmed rumor, as no pregnancy was ever officially announced. The Queen blamed herself for this and as a result became thin, suffering bouts of depression. Between 1579 and 1586, both she and her husband made numerous pious offerings and pilgrimages, especially to Chartres and spa treatments in the hope of having an heir. As a result, the heir presumptive was (after the death of the King's brother Francis, Duke of Anjou in 1584) the controversial Henry III of Navarre, a fact which placed additional pressure upon both Louise and her husband. In 1584, there were rumors that Henry III would divorce her, but they proved to be untrue. According to Brantôme, Louise was at one point advised by a lady-in-waiting, that because her marriage would not result in children, it would be wise to use a different method to accomplish this (referring to another biological father), but the Queen took deep offense at this advice and refused to listen.

As Queen consort, Louise was given a great representational role by Henry and often in his company, participating in ceremonies, parties, and receptions at his side, and performing representational tasks, such at the opening session of the Estates General and when she placed the foundation stone to Pont Neuf with her husband on 31 May 1578. She was never involved in state affairs except in a purely ceremonial sense: she attended the Council of the King, received ambassadors in her own chambers, and officiated over the opening of parliament when it was required that she perform such tasks for ceremonial reasons, but she never used these tasks to actually participate in politics.

Louise was popular among the public for her beauty and charitable personality. Due to this popularity, in 1588 she proved a moral symbolic support for the royal cause when she remained in Paris with her mother-in-law after the King had fled from the capital during his conflict with the Duke of Guise.

=== Queen dowager ===
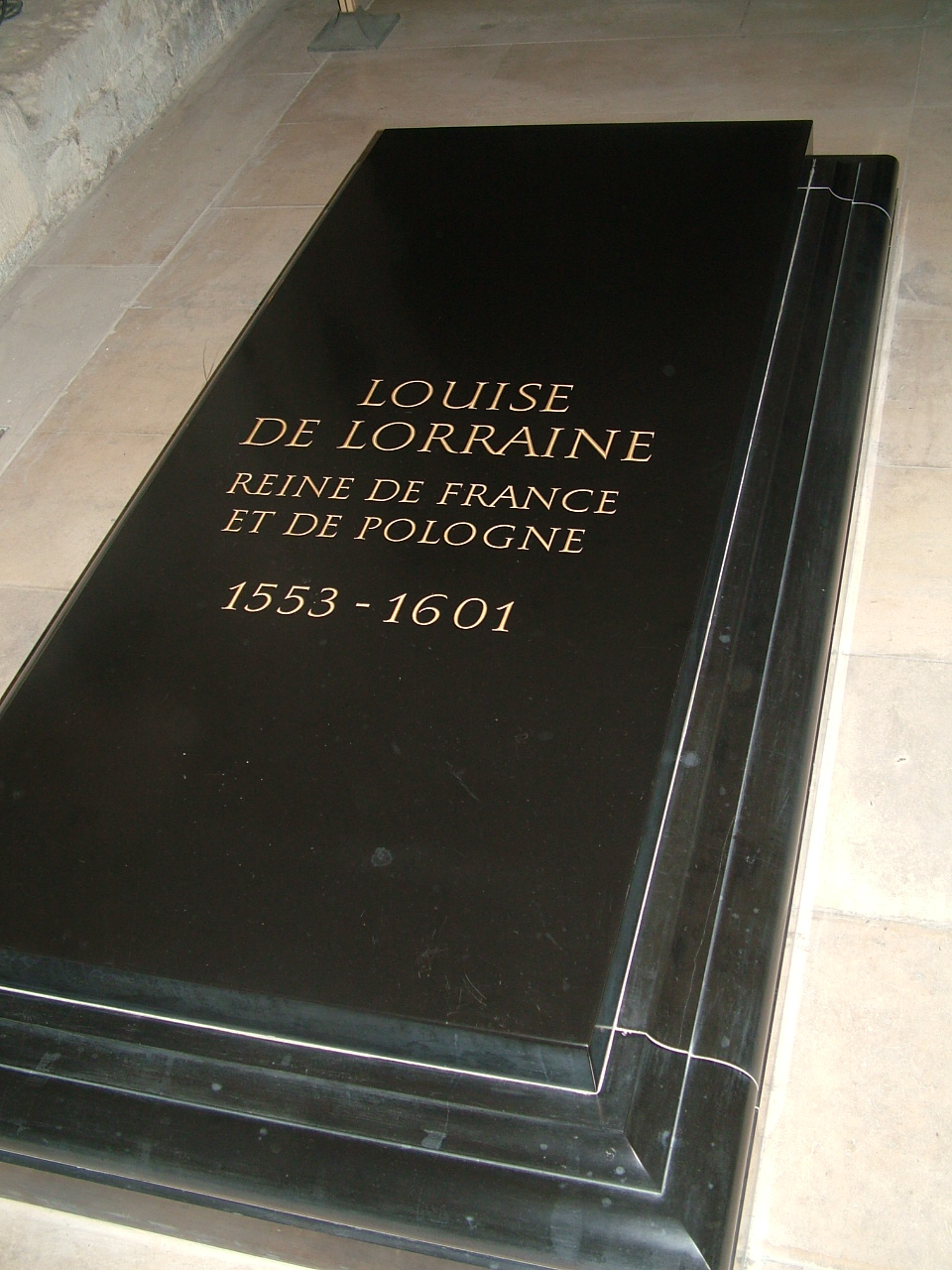
Grave of Queen Louise of France, née Princess of Lorraine, burial site at Saint-Denis (2008)

After the assassination of her husband by the Dominican Jacques Clément on 1 August 1589, Louise fell into a state of permanent depression and began to dress in white, the traditional mourning colour of French queens, being nicknamed the "White Queen". As a dower land, she received the Duchy of Berry during her lifetime. She was working to rehabilitate the memory of her husband, who had been excommunicated after the assassination of the Cardinal of Guise. On 6 September 1589, barely a month after the death of her husband, Louise asked Henry IV to clear her late husband's name, and on 20 January 1594, she officially demanded the rehabilitation of Henry III at a ceremony in Nantes.

Following her husband's death and for the next 11 years, Louise lived at the Château de Chenonceau, which she received as inheritance from her mother-in-law; she installed her room on the second floor, and she covered the walls with black. The decor was rather somber with the attributes ordinarily reserved for mourning: crosses, shovels and tips of the burial, cornucopia shedding tears. This black and silver decoration was reproduced on the curtains of the bed and the windows. But the castle being mired in debts and having not itself a huge pension, she bequeathed it to her niece Françoise of Lorraine, the only surviving child and heiress of her brother, who later married César de Bourbon, Duke of Vendôme (illegitimate son of King Henri IV and Gabrielle d'Estrées).

== Death ==
Louise died in the Château de Moulins in Moulins, Allier on 29 January 1601. She left 20,000 écus for the founding of a Capuchin convent in Bourges. In September 1603, a papal bull ordered the construction of a Convent of Capuchins in Paris, where she was buried on 20 March 1608. The original funerary monument was of a modest design in black marble and with the epitaph engraved in red letters.

Her remains, found in October 1805, are located since 1817 in the royal crypt of Saint Denis Basilica. She was the only queen consort prior to the French Revolution actually to be buried in a tomb bearing her name in Saint-Denis.

== Additional sources ==
- Adams, Charles Kingsley; Auerbach, Erna, eds. (1971). Paintings and Sculpture at Hatfield House. Constable.
- Boucher, Jacqueline (1995). Deux épouses et reines à la fin du XVIe siècle: Louise de Lorraine et Marguerite de France (in French). Publications de l'Universite de Saint-Etienne. ISBN 9782862720807.
- Diefendorf, Barbara B. (2004). From Penitence to Charity: Pious Women and the Catholic Reformation in Paris. Oxford University Press. ISBN 9780190282608.
- Holmes, Jr., Urban T. (1946). "The Background and Sources of Remy Belleau's Pierres Précieuses". PMLA. 61 (3 (Sep.): 624–635.
- Honegger, Marc; Prévost, Paul, eds. (1986). La musique et le rite sacré et profane: Actes du XIIIe Congrès de la Société internationale de musicologie, Strasbourg, 29 août–3 septembre 1982. Vol. 2: Communications libres. Association des Publications près les Universités de Strasbourg.
- Knecht, Robert J. (1998). Catherine de'Medici. Pearson Education Limited.
- Knecht, Robert J. (2016). Hero or Tyrant? Henry III, King of France, 1574-89. Routledge.
- Pernot, Michel (2013). Henri III, le roi décrié (in French). Éditions de Fallois.

Louise of Lorraine House of Lorraine Cadet branch of the House of Metz Born: 30 April 1553 Died: 29 January 1601
French royalty
| Vacant Title last held by Elisabeth of Austria | Queen consort of France; 15 February 1575 – 2 August 1589 | Succeeded by Margaret of France |
