= Catherine of Lorraine =

Catherine of Lorraine may refer to:

- Catherine of Lorraine, Margravine of Baden-Baden (1407–1439), daughter of Charles II, Duke of Lorraine
- Catherine de Lorraine (1551–1596), daughter of Francis, Duke of Guise and wife of Louis, Duke of Montpensier
- Catherine of Lorraine (1573–1648), daughter of Charles III, Duke of Lorraine, and Abbess of Remiremont
- Catherine de Mayenne (1585–1618), or Catherine de Mayenne-Lorraine-Guise, daughter of Charles, Duke of Mayenne who became Duchess of Mantua by marriage
