= Henri, Count of Chaligny =

Count of Chaligny, Marquis of Moy, and French Military Commander

Prince Henri of Lorraine (31 July 1570 - 26 November 1600), Count of Chaligny and Marquis of Moy, was a French nobleman and a commander in the Catholic League during the French Wars of Religion.

== Life ==
He was born at Nancy on 31 July 1570, the son of Nicolas, Duke of Mercœur, and his third wife, Catherine of Lorraine (1550-1606).

Henri began his military career in the service of Charles III, Duke of Lorraine, and rose to command the light cavalry that the duke sent in support of the Catholic League. In February 1589 he entered Rouen alongside Charles, Duke of Mayenne, and in the early 1590s fought with the Catholic League against the forces of Henry of Navarre. He was, embarrassingly, briefly the prisoner of Henry's fool, Chicot.

He went on to serve under his half-brother Philippe Emmanuel, Duke of Mercœur, both in France and later in the Long Turkish War.

He died in Vienna on 26 November 1600.

== Marriage and children ==
On 19 September 1585 he married Claude, Marquise of Moy (1572–1627), with whom he had four children:

1. Prince Charles of Lorraine (18 July 1592 – 28 April 1631), bishop of Verdun from 1611 to 1623
2. Princess Louise of Lorraine (9 February 1595 – 1 December 1667), who in 1608 married Florent (1588–1622), eldest son of Lamoral, 1st Prince of Ligne. Louise and Florent are the parents of Claude Lamoral, 3rd Prince of Ligne.
3. Prince Henri of Lorraine (27 March 1596–10 June 1672), count of Chaligny and marquis of Moy
4. Prince François of Lorraine (13 January 1599 – 10 June 1671), bishop of Verdun from 1623 to 1661.
