= Francis I of Lorraine =

Duke of Lorraine and Bar from 1544 to 1545

Francis I
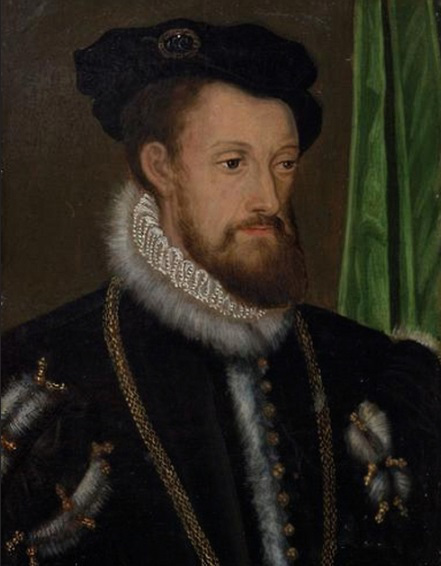
- 16th-century portrait of Francis

Duke of Lorraine and Bar
- Reign: 14 June 1544 – 12 June 1545
- Predecessor: Antoine
- Successor: Charles III
- Born: 23 August 1517; Nancy
- Died: 12 June 1545 (aged 27); Remiremont
- Spouse: Christina of Denmark (m. 1541)
- Issue: Charles III, Duke of Lorraine; Renata, Duchess of Bavaria; Dorothea, Duchess of Brunswick-Calenberg
- House: Lorraine
- Father: Antoine, Duke of Lorraine
- Mother: Renée of Bourbon

Francis I (French: François Ier de Lorraine) (23 August 1517 – 12 June 1545) was Duke of Lorraine from 1544–1545.

== History ==
Born in Nancy, Francis was the eldest son of Antoine, Duke of Lorraine and Renée de Bourbon, daughter of Gilbert de Bourbon, Count of Montpensier. He was briefly engaged in the mid-1530s to Anne of Cleves, who in 1540 would become the fourth wife of King Henry VIII of England. Their betrothal would be used by Henry to break his marriage to Anne after six short months.

On 10 July 1541, Francis married Christina of Denmark in Brussels. Christina was a daughter of King Christian II and Isabella of Austria. Francis died at Remiremont in 1545, leaving Duchess Christina as the regent of Lorraine and as the guardian of their young children.

== Children ==
By Christina of Denmark (c.1521 – 1590; married in 1541)

Name	Birth	Death	Notes
Charles	1543	1608	married Claude of Valois and had issue.
Renata	1544	1602	married William V, Duke of Bavaria and had issue.
Dorothea	1545	1621	married in 1575, Eric II, Duke of Calenberg

== See also ==
- Dukes of Lorraine family tree
- List of rulers of Lorraine

== Sources ==
- Carroll, Stuart (2009). Martyrs and Murderers: The Guise Family and the Making of Europe. Oxford University Press.
- Sidney, Philip (2012). Kuin, Roger (ed.). The Correspondence of Sir Philip Sidney. Vol. 1. Oxford University Press.
- Thomas, Andrew L. (2010). A House Divided: Wittelsbach Confessional Court Cultures in the Holy Roman Empire, c.1550-1650. Brill.
- Warnicke, Retha M. (2017). Elizabeth of York and Her Six Daughters-in-Law: Fashioning Tudor Queenship, 1485-1547. Palgrave Macmillan.

Francis I of Lorraine House of Lorraine Born: 23 August 1517 Died: 12 June 1545
Regnal titles
Preceded by Anthony	Duke of Lorraine and Bar; Marquis of Pont-à-Mousson; 1544–1545	Succeeded by Charles III
