= Renée of Bourbon =

Duchess consort of Lorraine

- Duchess of Lorraine
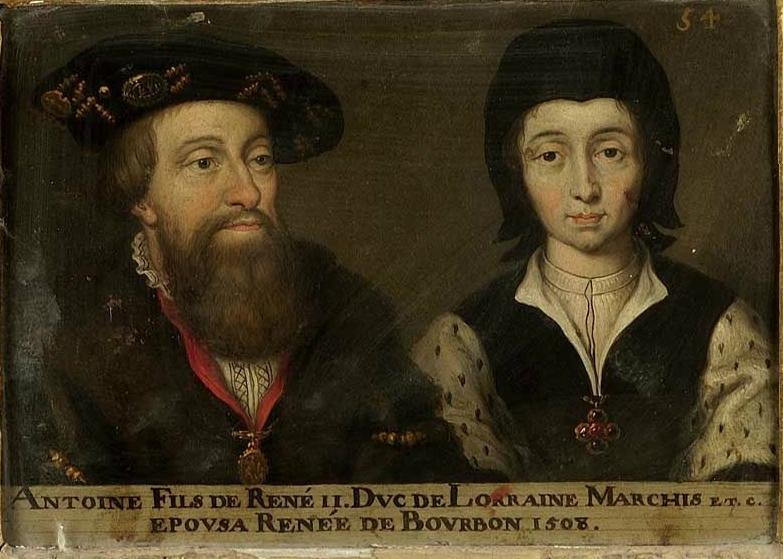
- Born: 1494
- Died: 26 May 1539 (aged 45); Nancy
- Noble family: Bourbon-Montpensier
- Spouse: Antoine, Duke of Lorraine (m. 1515)
- Issue: Francis I, Duke of Lorraine; Nicholas, Duke of Mercœur; Anna, Princess of Orange
- Father: Gilbert, Count of Montpensier
- Mother: Clara Gonzaga

Renée of Bourbon, Duchess of Lorraine (1494 – 26 May 1539), also called Renée, Lady of Mercœur, was a Duchess consort of Lorraine. She was a daughter of Gilbert de Bourbon, Count of Montpensier by Clara Gonzaga, and sister of Charles de Bourbon, Duke of Bourbon.

== Life ==
Renée was brought up with her cousins, the princesses of France. On 26 June 1515 she married Antoine, Duke of Lorraine in Amboise. The marriage was arranged by the French King, Francis. Francis had promised Antoine marriage to the French queen dowager, Mary Tudor of England, but when Mary chose another spouse, Francis replaced her with Renée.

Renee's entry to Nancy was described in a chronicle. She arrived at Nancy from Bar-le-Duc at the start of May 1516. First she stopped short of the town at a village called Laixou. After enjoying a magnificent picnic for six hours, she came to the gates of Nancy and was met by a choir on a scaffold singing in her honour, accompanied by cannon fire from the ramparts.

Renée, reportedly, did not have the force of character to exert any political influence in Lorraine. However, she became known for her cultivated Italian taste, and was said to have brought "the graces and refinement of the Mantuan Court" to Lorraine. The blossoming of the arts which took place in Nancy from the reign of Antoine has been attributed to her.

In August 1538, Renée was commanded to court at Compiègne to meet Mary of Austria, Queen of Hungary. In March 1539 she travelled to Neufchâteau to meet Antoine who had stomach trouble and they returned to Nancy. Renée died at Nancy of dysentery on 26 May 1539.

== Issue ==
Renee and Antoine had:

- Francis I, Duke of Lorraine (1517–1545), first the Marquis de Pont-à-Mousson.
- Anna (1522–1568), married firstly René of Châlon, Prince of Orange, and secondly Philip II, Duke of Aerschot (1496–1549)
- Nicolas, Duke of Mercœur (1524–1577), first Bishop of Verdun and Metz, then in 1548, Count of Vaudemont.

== Sources ==
- Bogdan, Henry (2013). La Lorraine des ducs (in French). Tempus. ISBN 978-2262042752.
- Braye, Lucien (1924). René de Chalon et le mausolée du Cœur (in French). Imprimerie Contant-Laguerre.
- Carroll, Stuart (2009). Martyrs and Murderers: The Guise Family and the Making of Europe. Oxford University Press. ISBN 978-0199229079.
- Ward, Adolphus William; Prothero, G.W.; Leathes, Stanley, eds. (1911). The Cambridge Modern History. Vol. 13. The Macmillan Co.

Renée of Bourbon House of Bourbon Born: 1494 Died: 26 May 1539
Royal titles
Preceded by Philippa of Guelders	Duchess consort of Lorraine; 1515–1539	Succeeded by Christina of Denmark
