= Stuart Carroll =

British historian (born 1965)

Stuart Carroll, FBA, FRHistS (born 1965) is a British historian and academic, who specialises in early modern Europe. Since 2007, he has been Professor of Early Modern History at the University of York.

== Early life and education ==
Carroll was born in 1965 in Whitechapel, London, England. He undertook his Bachelor of Arts (BA) degree at the University of Bristol and his Doctor of Philosophy (PhD) at the University of London.

== Academic career ==
In 1992, Carroll joined the University of York as a lecturer in its Department of History. Having been previously promoted to senior lecturer, he was appointed Professor of Early Modern History in 2007. He served as Head of the Department at History from 2011 to 2015.

== Honours ==
Carroll was awarded the J. Russell Major Prize of the American Historical Association in 2011 for the best French history book of the year for his Martyrs and Murderers: The Guise Family and the Making of Europe (2009).

In 2013, Carroll was elected a Fellow of the Royal Historical Society (FRHistS). In 2024, he was elected a Fellow of the British Academy (FBA), the United Kingdom's national academy for the humanities and social sciences.

== Selected publications ==
- Enmity and Violence in Early Modern Europe. Cambridge: Cambridge University Press, 2023.
- Martyrs and Murderers: The Guise Family and the Making of Europe. Oxford: Oxford University Press, 2009.
- Cultures of Violence: Interpersonal Violence in Historical Perspective (editor). Palgrave Macmillan, 2007.
- Blood and Violence in Early Modern France. Oxford: Oxford University Press, 2006.
- Noble Power during the French Wars of Religion: the Guise Affinity and the Catholic Cause in Normandy. Cambridge: Cambridge University Press, 1998.
