= Nomeny =

- Commune
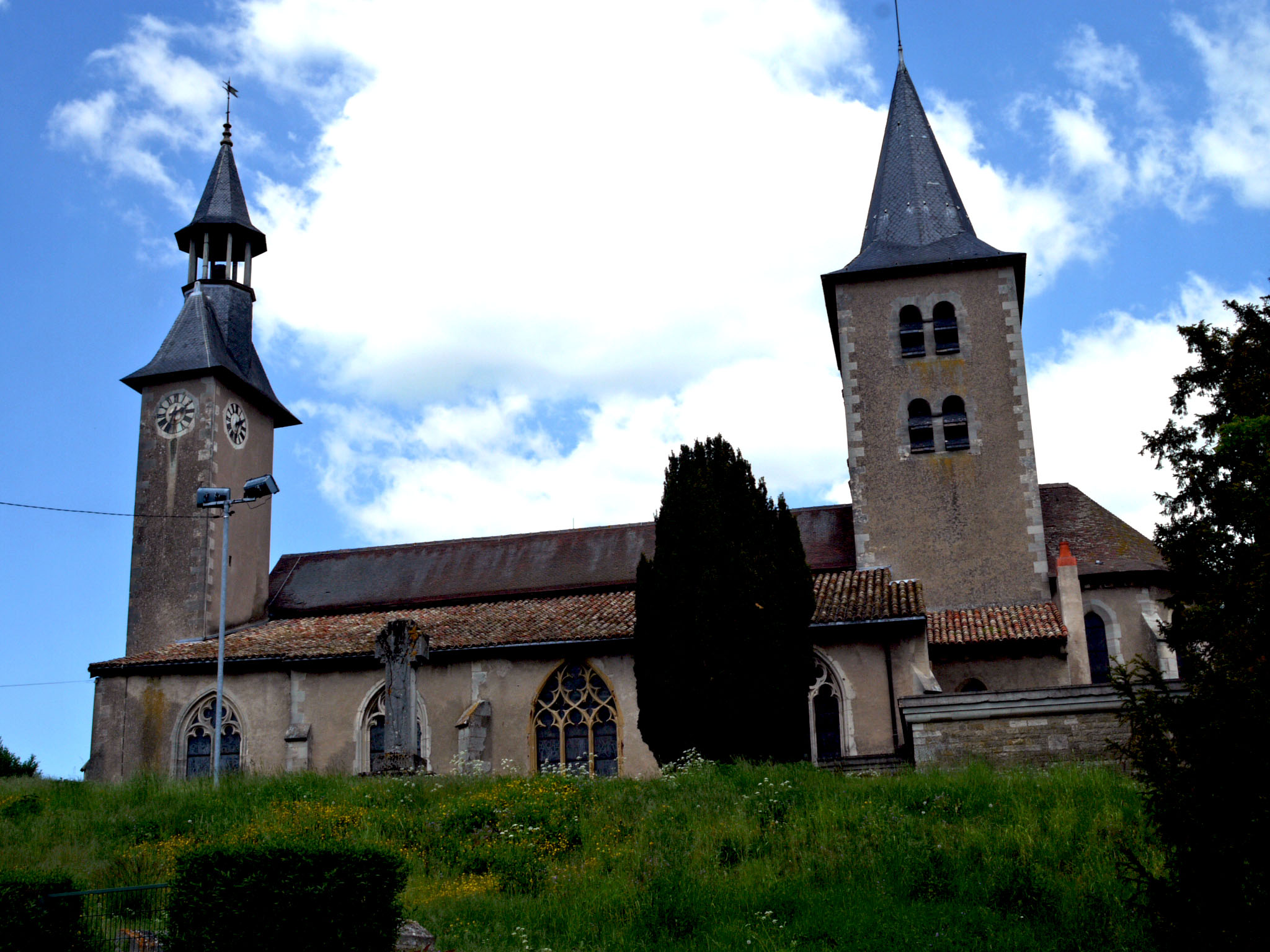
- The church in Nomeny

- Coat of arms
- Location of Nomeny
- Location within France Location within Grand Est
- Coordinates: 48°53′26″N 6°13′33″E
- Country: France
- Region: Grand Est
- Department: Meurthe-et-Moselle
- Arrondissement: Nancy
- Canton: Entre Seille et Meurthe
- Intercommunality: Seille et Grand Couronné

Government
  - Mayor (2020–2026): Antony Caps
- Area^{1}: 17.79 km^{2} (6.87 sq mi)
- Elevation: 185 m (607 ft)
- Highest elevation: 340 m (1,120 ft)
- Lowest elevation: 179 m (587 ft)
- Population (2023): 1,142
  - Density: 64.19/km^{2} (166.3/sq mi)
- Time zone: UTC+01:00 (CET)
  - Summer (DST): UTC+02:00 (CEST)
- INSEE/Postal code: 54400 /54610
- ^{1} French Land Register data, which excludes lakes, ponds, glaciers > 1 km^{2} (0.386 sq mi or 247 acres) and river estuaries.

Nomeny (French pronunciation: [nɔmni]), also Nomény ([nɔmeni]), is a commune in the Meurthe-et-Moselle department in north-eastern France. South of Nomeny, there is a mediumwave broadcasting station, which works on 837 kHz with 300 kW. It uses two guyed masts with different height, which are both insulated against ground, as antenna. The tallest of them has a height of 160 metres.

== See also ==
- Communes of the Meurthe-et-Moselle department
