= Claude of Valois =

Duchess of Lorraine from 1559 to 1575

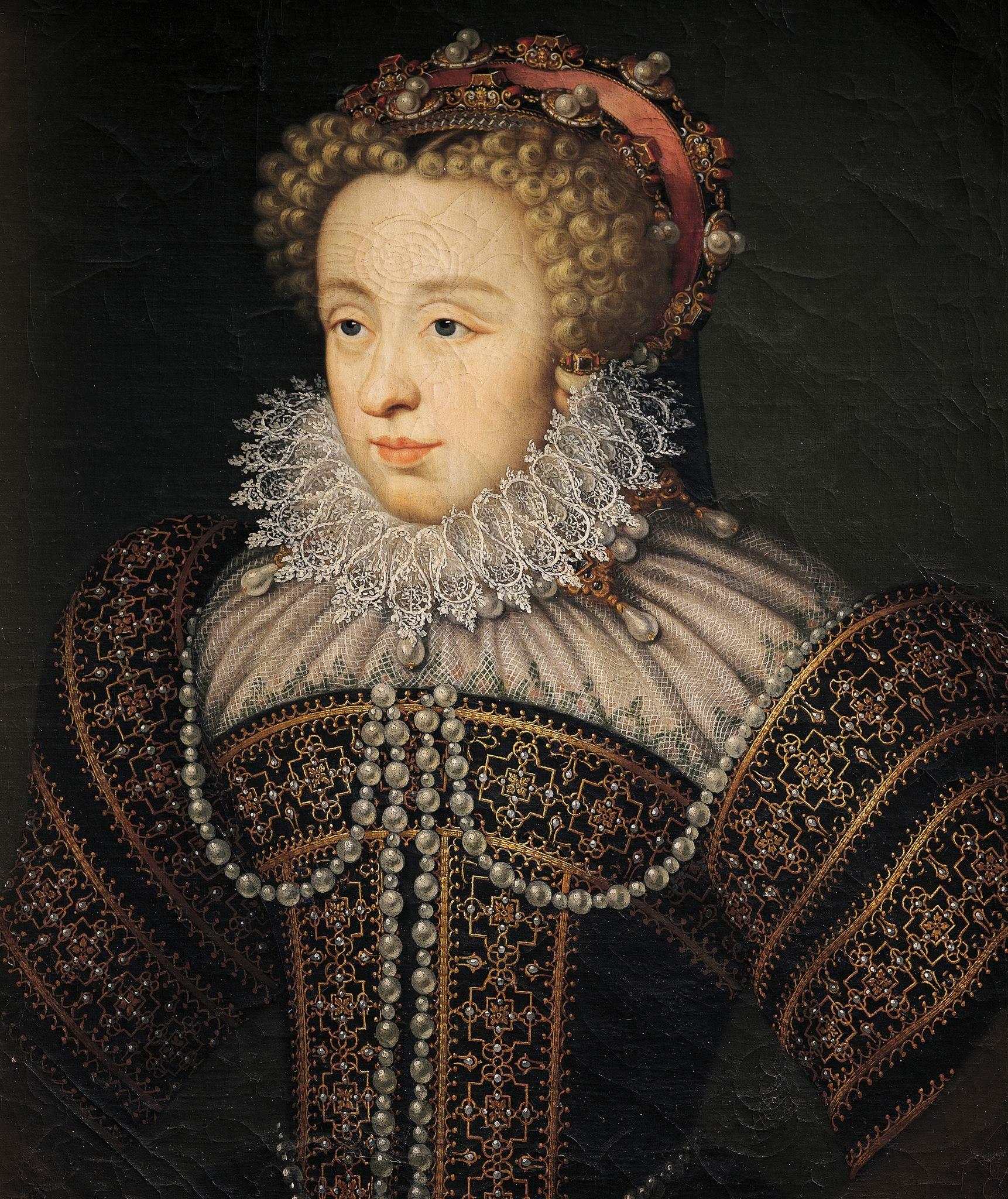
- Portrait by François Clouet

Duchess consort of Lorraine
- Tenure: 19 January 1559 – 21 February 1575
- Born: 12 November 1547; Fontainebleau, France
- Died: 21 February 1575 (aged 27); Nancy, France
- Spouse: Charles III, Duke of Lorraine (m. 1559)
- Issue: Henry II, Duke of Lorraine; Christina, Grand Duchess of Tuscany; Charles, Bishop of Metz and Strasbourg; Antoinette, Duchess of Jülich-Cleves-Berg; Anne of Lorraine; Francis II, Duke of Lorraine; Catherine, Abbess of Remiremont; Elisabeth, Electress of Bavaria; Claude of Lorraine
- House: Valois-Angoulême
- Father: Henry II of France
- Mother: Catherine de' Medici

Claude of Valois (12 November 1547 – 21 February 1575) was a French princess as the second daughter of King Henry II of France and Catherine de' Medici, and Duchess of Lorraine by marriage to Charles III, Duke of Lorraine.

== Biography ==
Claude was born in Fontainebleau, but as she was believed to have been conceived at Chateau d'Anet, she was nicknamed as 'Mademoiselle d'Anet' at court, a nickname that displeased her mother.

Claude was raised alongside her sister Elisabeth, and her future sister-in-law, Mary, Queen of Scots. The royal children were raised under the supervision of the governor and governess of the royal children, Jean d'Humières and his wife Françoise d'Humières, under the orders of Diane de Poitiers.

Claude was victim of the unhealthy traits that Catherine appeared to pass on to all her children with the exception of Marguerite, and suffered from a hunchback and a club foot, and during her childhood she was frequently vulnerable to various diseases.

On 19 January 1559, at the age of 11, she married Charles III, Duke of Lorraine, in the cathedral of Notre Dame in Paris. The marriage was arranged as a symbolic union of peace between France and Lorraine, after Charles III had spent his childhood as a hostage at the French royal court, and completed after the Treaty of Chateau-Cambresis. Claude departed to Lorraine with her spouse in late 1559, shortly before the departure of her sister Elisabeth to Spain and her aunt Marguerite to Savoy.

=== Duchess of Lorraine ===
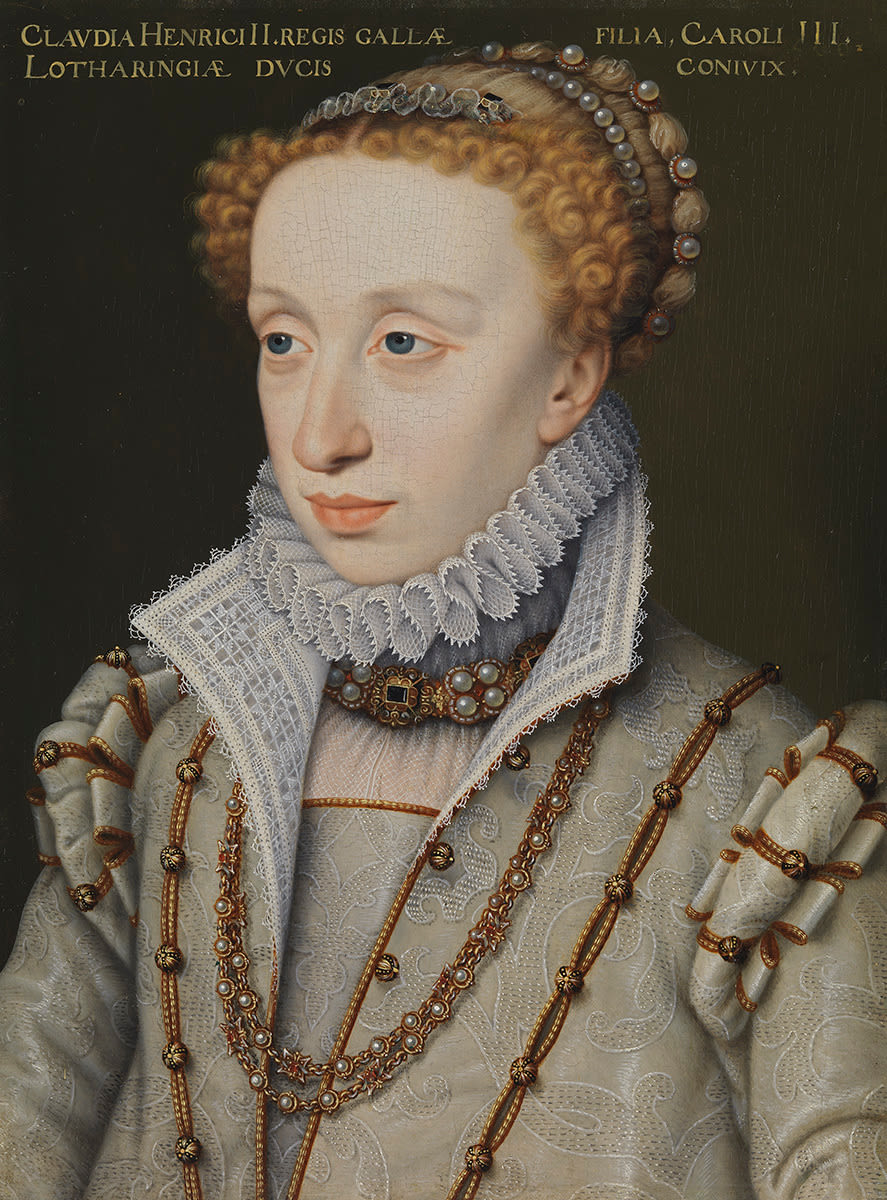
Portrait by François Clouet c. 1570-1572

The relationship between Claude and Charles III was described as a happy one. Claude was a favorite of her mother, who occasionally visited her in Lorraine, visits described as rare occasions of private family gatherings in the life of Catherine de' Medici, who enjoyed seeing her grandchildren by Claude and also liked her son-in-law Charles very much. Catherine de' Medici was, for example, present in Bar-le-Duc for the splendid baptism of Claude's firstborn son Henry, along with her younger children.

In 1570, Margaret of Valois wrote to her sister for help. For some time, their mother and brother, the Duke of Anjou, had come to believe that there was a romance between Margôt and Henry of Guise, nicknamed le Balafré ("Scarface") whose family the Valois distrusted and disliked. Claude arranged the marriage of the Duke of Guise to the Princess of Porcien, and mediated for her family members, explaining to her mother that the supposed romance between Margôt and Navarre was nothing more than a vicious lie invented to discredit her.

Claude attended the wedding between Henry of Navarre and her sister Margaret of Valois in Paris in August 1572. On her way there, she had been ill and cared for by her mother in Chalons, which was the reason why Catherine de' Medici had been absent from the royal court during the border attack of Jean de Genlis near the Spanish Netherlands in July, which was used by Admiral Coligny to attempt to convince Charles IX to declare war on Spain.

On the evening of the Massacre, Claude was evidently informed that a massacre was to take place against the groom of her sister and his followers, and Margaret of Valois described how Claude had tears in her eyes and tried to stop her from leaving their mother's chamber, when Margaret was about to retire to the chamber of her spouse. Claude took Margaret's arm and begged her not to leave: she was contradicted by their mother, who warned Claude not to tell Margaret anything. Claude told their mother that it was not right to send Margaret to be "sacrificed", as she would risk becoming a target, but Catherine de' Medici replied to Claude that Margaret would be safe if God wished it, that it would arouse suspicion if she did not go, and then told Margaret to leave, upon which Claude cried. After the massacre started, one of the courtiers of Navarre, de Leran, broke into the bedchamber of Margaret and begged her to save him from the captain of the Guards, M. de Nancay, who gave her the man's life, and then escorted her to the chamber of Claude, where she was given refuge during the massacre.

During the last of her frequent visits to the French court, her brother the king gave her the gift of "the ransoms of Guyenne, which came from the confiscations that took place there", and in turn gave one of the ransoms to Jeanne de Dampierre when asked.

Brantôme gave the following description of her:

"In her beauty she resembled her mother, in her knowledge and kindness she resembled her aunt; and the people of Lorraine found her ever kind as long as she lived, as I myself have seen when I went to that country; and after her death they found much to say of her. In fact, by her death that land was filled with regrets, and M. de Lorraine mourned her so much that, though he was young when widowed of her, he would not marry again, saying he could never find her like, though could he do so he would remarry, not being disinclined. [...] In short, she was a true daughter of France, having good mind and ability, which she proved by seconding wisely and ably her husband, M. de Lorraine, in the government of his seigneuries and principalities."

Claude died in childbirth in 1575 at the age of 27. Brantôme wrote that she "died in child-bed, through the appetite of an old midwife of Paris, a drunkard, in whom she had more faith than in any other."

== Children ==
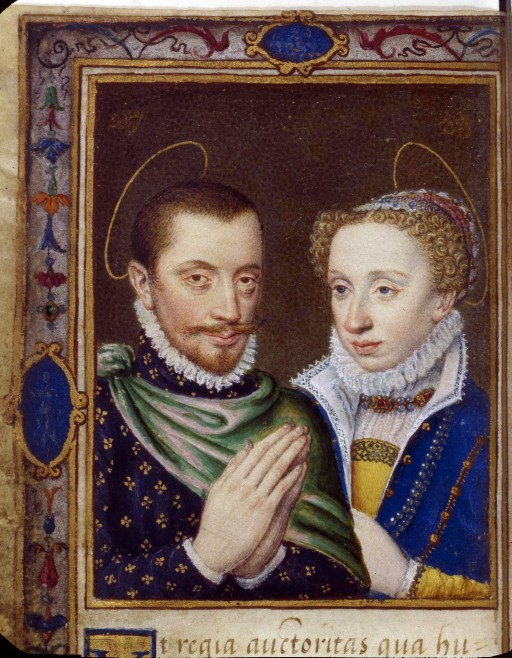
Illustration of Charles and Claude from Catherine de' Medici's book of hours, 1572

Claude and her husband had nine children:

- Henry II, Duke of Lorraine (1563–1624)
- Christina of Lorraine (16 August 1565 – 19 December 1637); married Ferdinando I de' Medici, Grand Duke of Tuscany.
- Charles of Lorraine (1567–1607), Cardinal of Lorraine and Bishop of Metz (1578–1607), Bishop of Strasbourg (1604–1607).
- Antonia of Lorraine (1568–1610); married Jean-Guillaume, Duke of Jülich-Cleves-Berg.
- Anne of Lorraine (1569–1576)
- Francis II, Duke of Lorraine (1572–1632)
- Catherine of Lorraine (1573–1648), Abbesse de Remiremont.
- Elisabeth of Lorraine (1574–1635); married Maximilian I, Elector of Bavaria.
- Claude of Lorraine (1575–1576)

== Sources ==
- Knecht, R.J. (1999). Catherine de' Medici (2nd ed.). Longman.
- Dhondt, Frederik (2015). Balance of Power and Norm Hierarchy: Franco-British Diplomacy after the Peace of Utrecht. Brill.
- Ward, Adolphus William; Prothero, G.W.; Leathes, Stanley, eds. (1911). The Cambridge Modern History. Vol. 13. The Macmillan Co.
- Anselme de Sainte-Marie, Père (1726). Histoire généalogique et chronologique de la maison royale de France [Genealogical and chronological history of the royal house of France] (in French). Vol. 1 (3rd ed.). Paris: La compagnie des libraires.
- Tomas, Natalie R. (2003). The Medici Women: Gender and Power in Renaissance Florence. Aldershot, UK: Ashgate. ISBN 0-7546-0777-1.
- Whale, Winifred Stephens (1914). The La Trémoille family. Boston, Houghton Mifflin. p. 43.

Claude of Valois House of Valois, Angoulême branch Cadet branch of the House of Capet Born: 12 November 1547 Died: 21 February 1575
Royal titles
Vacant Title last held by Christina of Denmark	Duchess consort of Lorraine; 1559–1575	Vacant Title next held by Margerita Gonzaga
