= Charles III of Lorraine =

Duke of Lorraine and Bar from 1545 to 1608

Charles III
- Marquis of Pont-à-Mousson
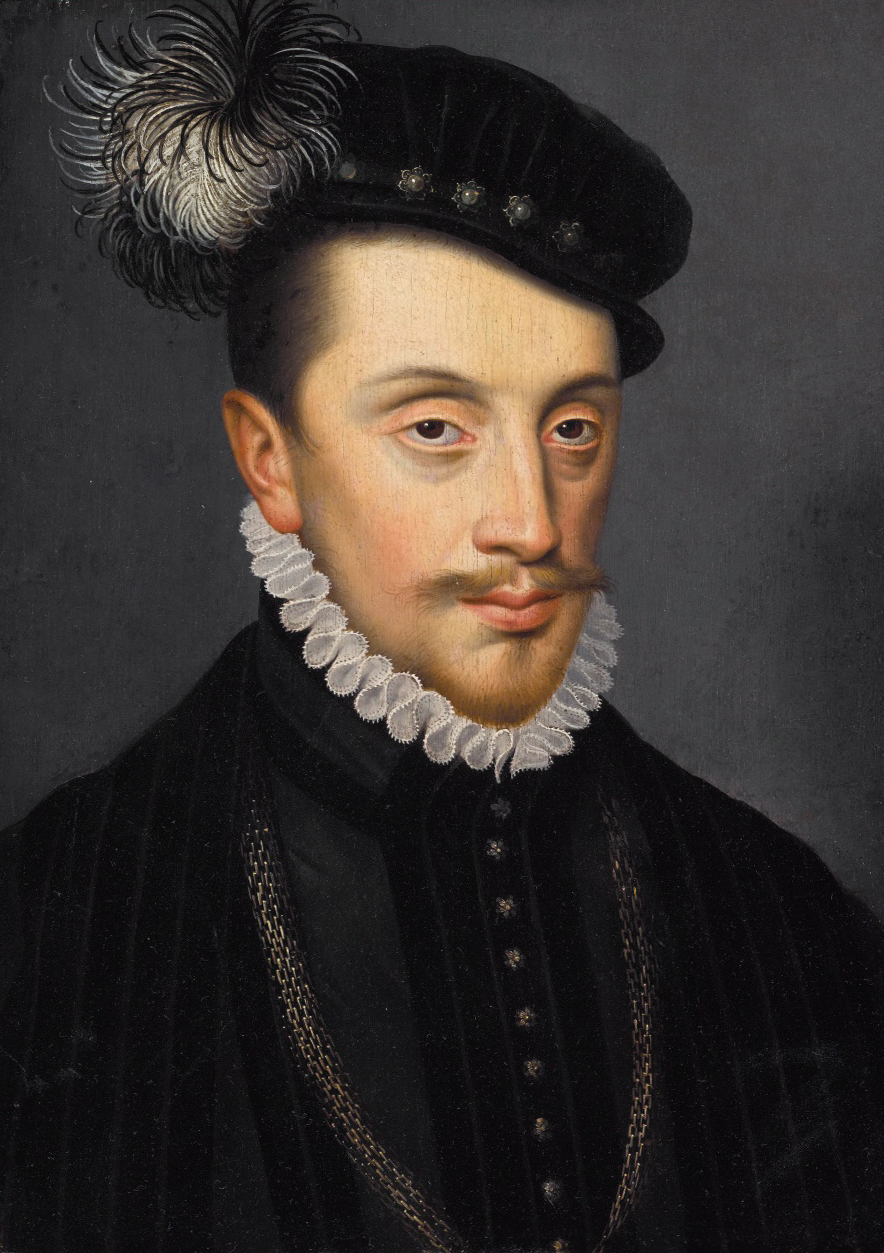
- Portrait by the studio of François Clouet

Duke of Lorraine and Bar
- Reign: 12 June 1545 – 14 May 1608
- Predecessor: Francis I
- Successor: Henry II
- Born: 18 February 1543; Ducal Palace of Nancy
- Died: 14 May 1608 (aged 65)
- Spouse: Claude of Valois (m. 1559; died 1575)
- Issue: Henry II of Lorraine; Christina, Grand Duchess of Tuscany; Charles of Lorraine, Bishop of Metz and Strasbourg; Antoinette, Duchess of Jülich-Cleves-Berg; Francis II of Lorraine; Catherine, Abbess of Remiremont; Elisabeth, Electress of Bavaria
- House: Lorraine
- Father: Francis I of Lorraine
- Mother: Christina of Denmark
- Religion: Roman Catholicism

Charles III (18 February 1543 – 14 May 1608), known as the Great, was Duke of Lorraine from 1545 until his death.

== Life ==
Charles was the eldest surviving son of Francis I of Lorraine, and Christina of Denmark. In 1545, his father died, and his mother served as the regent during his minority. During his childhood, his aged great-grandmother, Philippa of Gelderland, died in 1547, leaving also her inheritance to the young Charles. His dynasty claimed the Kingdom of Jerusalem and used also the title of Duke of Calabria as symbol of their claims to the Kingdom of Naples. Additionally, they had a claim to the Duchy of Gelderland, inherited from Charles of Egmont, Duke of Gelderland.

In 1552, Lorraine was invaded by France, his mother's regency was terminated and Charles was removed from Lorraine to France, to be raised at the French royal court in accordance to the needs of French interests. According to Julio Alvarotto, envoy of Ercole II d'Este, Duke of Ferrara, Charles paid for a masque involving pageant ships with sails of silver cloth, designed by Bartolomeo Campi, at the wedding of Mary, Queen of Scots, and Francis, Dauphin of France, on 24 April 1558. During the pageant he danced with his future wife, Claude of France. In 1559, they were married and he was allowed to depart to Lorraine and take control of his domain.

The reign of Charles is regarded as a great age of peace and prosperity for Lorraine. He pursued a policy of neutrality between France and The Holy Roman Empire, as well as during the French Wars of Religion. He founded the University of Pount-a-Mousson. He also expanded his realm by the incorporation of Pfalzburg from George John I, Count Palatine of Veldenz, in 1590, and tried to conquer also Lützelstein, though George John I's widow, Anna of Sweden, managed to negotiate a truce.

In 1590, Charles broke his policy of neutrality and allied himself with the French Catholic League because he, as a Catholic, could not accept Henry of Navarre as king of France. In his peace with Henry in 1594, he married his son to Henry's sister Catherine de Bourbon.

== Family ==
In 1559, Charles married Claude of Valois, princess of France, daughter of King Henri II and Catherine de' Medici. They had the following children:

- Henry II of Lorraine (1563–1624) married Catherine de Bourbon and Margerita Gonzaga
- Christine (1565–1637), married Ferdinando I de' Medici, Grand Duke of Tuscany
- Charles (1567–1607), Cardinal of Lorraine and Bishop of Metz (1578–1607), Bishop of Strasbourg (1604–1607)
- Antoinette (1568–1610), married John William, Duke of Jülich-Cleves-Berg.
- Anne (10 October 1569 – 8 August 1576), died in early childhood.
- Francis II of Lorraine (1572–1632) married Christina of Salm
- Catherine (1573-1648), Abess de Remiremont
- Elisabeth Renata (1574–1635), married Maximilian I, Elector of Bavaria
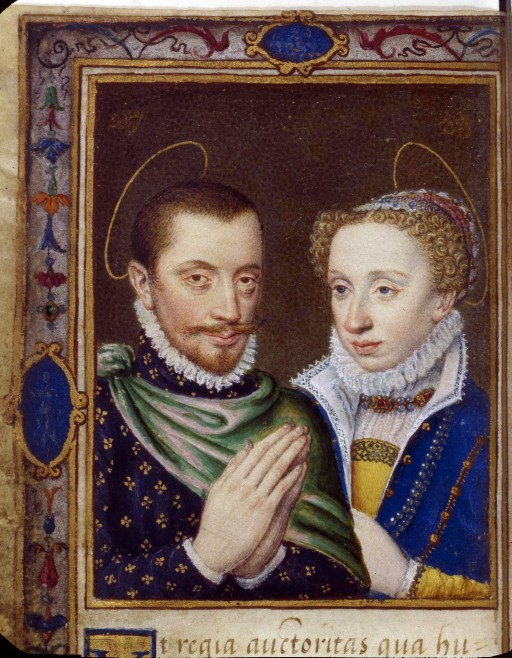
- Charles and his wife Claude
  Claude, (20 February 1575 – 2 October 1576), died in early childhood.

== See also ==
- Dukes of Lorraine family tree

== Sources ==
- Bogdan, Henry (2005). La Lorraine des ducs (in French). Perrin.
- Butters, Suzanne B. (2007). "The Uses and Abuses of Gifts in the World of Ferdinando de' Medici (1549-1609)". I Tatti Studies. 11: 243–354.
- Dundas, Iara Alejandra (2018). "Honneurs et applaudissements: celebrating the first Jesuit saints in seventeenth-century France". In Frost, Christian; Browne, Jemma; Lucas, Ray (eds.). Architecture, Festival and the City. Routledge. pp. 63–80. ISBN 9780429778049.
- von Friedeburg, Robert; Morrill, John, eds. (2017). Monarchy Transformed: Princes and their Elites in Early Modern Western Europe. Cambridge University Press.
- Van Scoy, Herbert; Weber, Bernerd C. (1952). "The Marriage of Mary Queen of Scots and the Dauphin". Scottish Historical Review. 31 (111, Part 1 (April)).

Preceded by Francis I	Duke of Lorraine and Bar; Marquis of Pont-à-Mousson; 1545–1608	Succeeded by Henry II
