= Siege of Philippsburg =

Siege of Philippsburg may refer to:

- Siege of Philippsburg (1644) by France during the Thirty Years' War
- Siege of Philippsburg (1676) by the Holy Roman Empire during the Franco-Dutch War
- Siege of Philippsburg (1688) by France during the Nine Years' War
- Siege of Philippsburg (1734) by France during the War of the Polish Succession
