= Maximilian Lorenz Starhemberg =

Austrian soldier (1640–1689)

Maximilian Lorenz von Starhemberg
- Born: c. 1640
- Died: 17 September 1689 (aged 48–49)
- Buried: Bildstein
- Allegiance: Holy Roman Empire
- Branch: Imperial Army
- Service years: 1664–1689
- Rank: Generalfeldmarschall
- Conflicts: Austro–Turkish War of 1663–64 War of Devolution Great Turkish War: Siege of Visegrád; Siege of Buda; Nine Years' War: Siege of Philippsburg; Siege of Mainz

Maximilian Lorenz Graf von Starhemberg (c. 1640 – 17 September 1689) was an Austrian field marshal as well as the younger brother of Ernst Rüdiger von Starhemberg, who defended Vienna during the siege of Vienna in 1683.

== Life ==
Starhemberg was born around 1640, the second son of Count Konrad Balthasar von Starhemberg (1612-1687) by his first wife, Countess Anna Elisabeth von Zinzendorf and Pottendorf (1608-1659). Between 1662 and 1664, Starhemberg worked as a chamberlain for Archduke Charles Joseph of Austria and Leopold I, Holy Roman Emperor. In 1664, Starhemberg joined the imperial army as a captain during the Austro–Turkish war of 1663–64. Folloqing the war, Starhemberg was promoted to lieutenant colonel. Starhemberg served the Spanish king during the War of Devolution in 1667–68 and was in turn promoted to colonel. Starhemberg, as a general of the cavalry later led troops during the Siege of Visegrád, part of the Great Turkish War. Starhemberg was later distinguished by the royal family for his efforts during the siege, which successfully pushed the Ottomans out of Visegrád. Starhemberg, alongside his brother Ernst, led Imperial troops against a besieged Ottoman force during the unsuccessful siege of Buda the same year. In 1688, Starhemberg chose his final resting place where he would reside after his death. Starhemberg also wrote his will in 1688. Starhemberg and an Imperial force held out against France during the Siege of Philippsburg in 1688. After about a monthlong siege, Starhemberg and his men surrendered the fortress and went to Ulm. Following the defeat, Starhemberg was acquitted by a military court from any wrongdoing, after questioning. In 1689, Starhemberg was promoted to Feldmarschall (field marshal).

== Death and funeral ==
Starhemberg was hit with a bullet on 6 September 1689 during the Siege of Mainz and died 11 days later, on 17 September 1689. Starhemberg had chosen to be buried in Bildstein the year before, and he was buried there on 11 October 1689.

== Personal life ==
Starhemberg married Dorothea Polixena von Scherffenberg in 1664. They had 1 child. Before joining the Imperial Army, Starhemberg signed a marriage contract that ensured his wife would be taken care of in the event of his death.
