= Siege of Buda (1684) =

Siege in the Great Turkish War

Coordinates: 47.4666°N 19.05°E

- Part of Great Turkish War
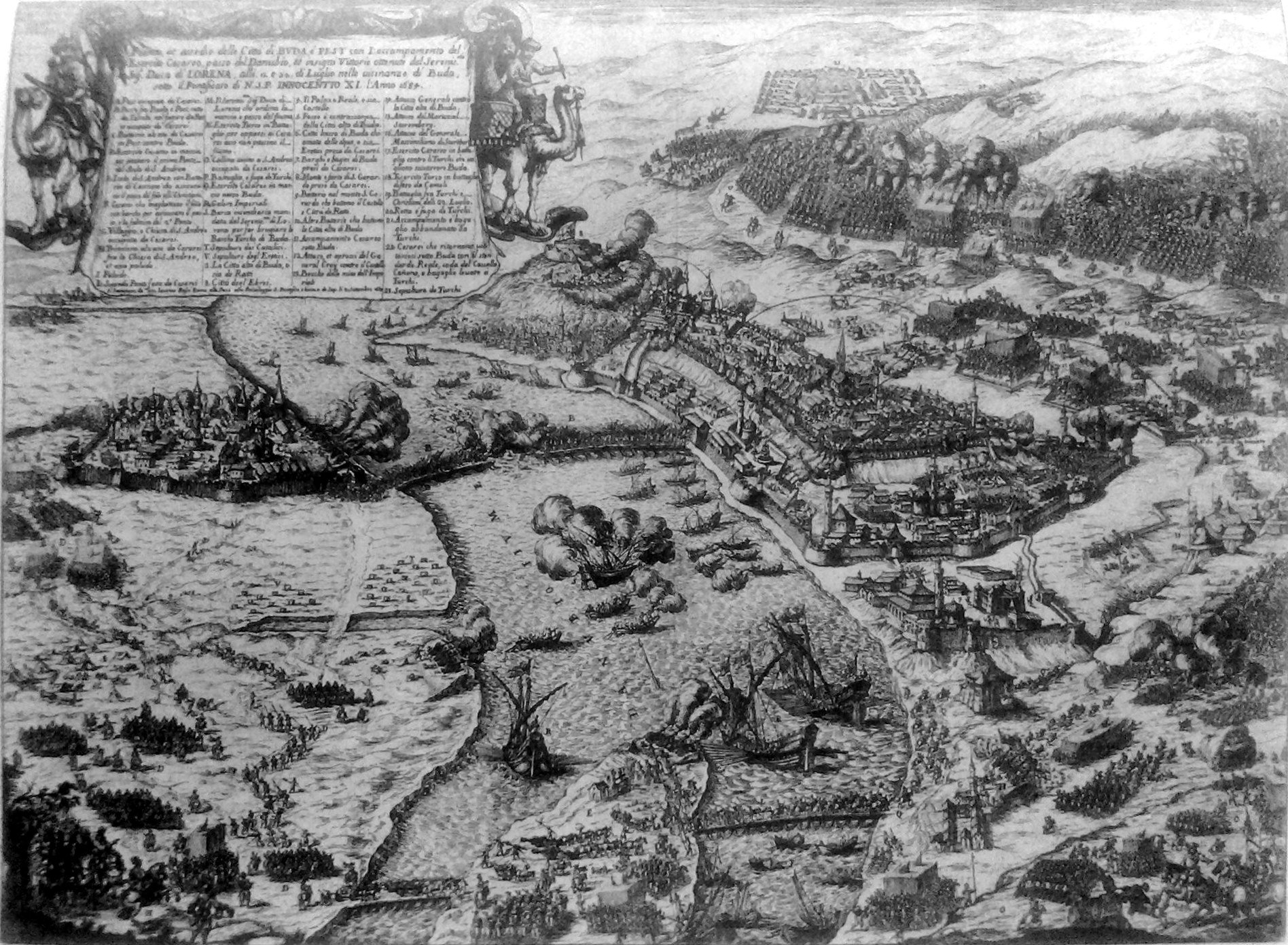
- Engraving of the siege of Buda by Giovanni Giacomo de Rossi
Date	14 July – 30 October 1684
Location	Buda, Ottoman Hungary
Result	Ottoman victory

Belligerents
Ottoman Empire	Holy Roman Empire

Commanders and leaders
(Ottoman Empire) Grand Vizier Kara Ibrahim Pasha (Ottoman Empire) Abdi Pasha the Albanian	(Holy Roman Empire) Charles V, Duke of Lorraine (Holy Roman Empire) Louis William, Margrave of Baden-Baden (Holy Roman Empire) Ernst Rüdiger von Starhemberg

Strength
7,000 inside Buda; 17,000 relief forces	34,000–43,000

Casualties and losses
Unknown	24,000–30,000

The siege of Buda (14 July – 30 October 1684) was a siege by the Holy Roman Empire of the Ottoman fortress of Buda. After 109 days, the siege was abandoned.

== Prelude ==
In May 1684, an army of 38,000–43,000 men marched under Charles V, Duke of Lorraine to capture the city of Buda from the Turks. After the main army crossed the Danube at Esztergom on 13 June, the front of the imperial army under the command of Maximilian Lorenz Starhemberg and the cavalry Gen. Louis William, Margrave of Baden-Baden arrived at the castle town of Visegrád on 15 June. On 16 June the town of Esztergom was taken by storm by imperial troops in spite of its strong walls, after a gate was destroyed by cannons. The majority of the Turkish occupation troops were killed and the city was plundered. Only a few Turks managed to withdraw to the castle on the rock above the city. After a siege of 1-1/2 days, the remaining Turkish garrison capitulated on 18 June.

On 27 June the imperial army met a strong Turkish force of 17,000 men at the Battle of Vác under the command of Grand Vizier Kara İbrahim Pasha, who would eventually drive out the Habsburgs. Although the Turks had entrenched themselves in a favorable position, Karl V opened the fight with cannon fire. The center of the imperial troops was led by Maximilian Lorenz von Starhemberg, and after a rather short fight he knew that the Turkish troops were defeated. Vác fell to the imperial army the same day.

== Siege ==
On 30 June the imperial main army entered the city of Pest, to which the Turks had set fire shortly before. After the army crossed the Danube at Vác, it began the siege of Buda, which was defended by approximately 7,000 Turks. The imperial army of 34,000 men began the bombardment of Buda's fortress with 200 cannons on 14 July 1684, the anniversary of the beginning of the siege of Vienna. Field Marshal Graf Ernst Rüdiger von Starhemberg was assigned to conduct the siege.

On 19 July imperial forces took control of the lower part of the town of Buda. However, since too few troops were available to occupy it, Ernst Rüdiger ordered the houses in that part of the town burned down. Throughout July and August the imperial army made several attempts to attack the fortress, but all were repelled by the Turkish defenders.

At the beginning of September, an imperial general reported that the number of soldiers fit for service had shrunk to 12,500, and morale was low. On 11 September an imperial auxiliary corps reached Buda, providing new momentum to the campaign.

On 22 September a Turkish relief army arrived and attacked the besieging forces. The imperial army managed to repel them but was unable to defeat them. The Turkish relief army then engaged imperial troops in repeated nuisance attacks which, coupled with losses caused by the Turkish city garrison, caused a plunge in morale. Ernst Rüdiger, who was severely wounded and facing sustained criticism from his army, had to be replaced. The final blow was a spell of poor weather conditions throughout October, and the decision was made to withdraw.

On 30 October the imperial army withdrew after a siege that had lasted 109 days. Several factors had caused the size of the allied force to shrink to about half its original size: battle losses, dysentery and a fever epidemic, poorly dug trenches and tactical errors in the siege. Capt. Paul Joseph Jakob von Starhemberg and the Christian allies after this failed enterprise had sustained losses of between 24,000—30,000 men. Ironically, the blame for the failure was laid on the man who had only led the army at the beginning of the siege: Ernst Ruediger von Starhemberg.
