= Battle of Ortenbach =

1678 battle during the Franco-Dutch War

- Part of Franco-Dutch War
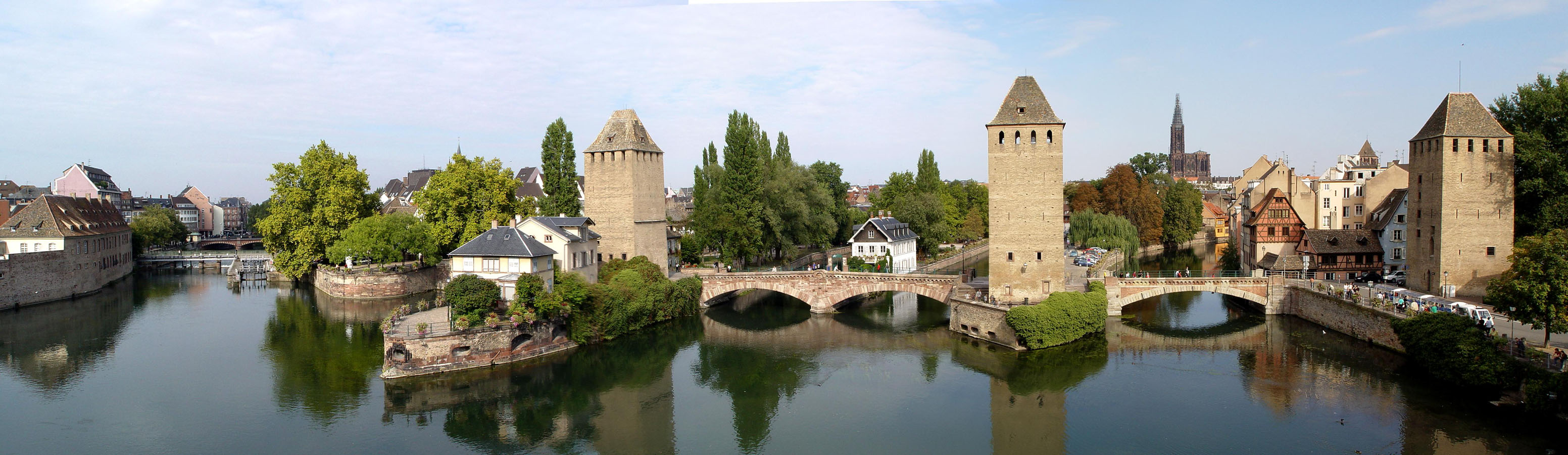
- The Barrage Vauban across the Rhine at Strasbourg; the 1678 campaign ensured French control
Date	23 July 1678
Location	Near Offenburg, Baden-Württemberg, Germany
Result	French victory

Belligerents
France	Holy Roman Empire

Commanders and leaders
(Kingdom of France) de Créquy (Kingdom of France) Schomberg	(Duchy of Lorraine) Charles of Lorraine

Strength
15,000–18,000	20,000–30,000 (maximum)

Casualties and losses
Minimal	Minimal
- The precise derivation of 'Ortenbach' is unclear but is the title given by historian John Lynn and others.

The Battle of Ortenbach, also known as the Battle of Gengenbach, took place on 23 July 1678 during the closing stages of the 1672-1678 Franco-Dutch War, in the modern German state of Baden-Württemberg. It featured a French army commanded by François de Créquy and an Imperial force under Charles V, Duke of Lorraine.

While in reality a skirmish, rather than a battle, Ortenbach was part of a series of events that enabled the French to secure Alsace and capture both Kehl and the crossing over the Rhine near the Imperial city of Strasbourg. The war ended in January 1679 when France and the Holy Roman Empire signed the Treaty of Nijmegen; Strasbourg was annexed by France in 1681.

== Background ==
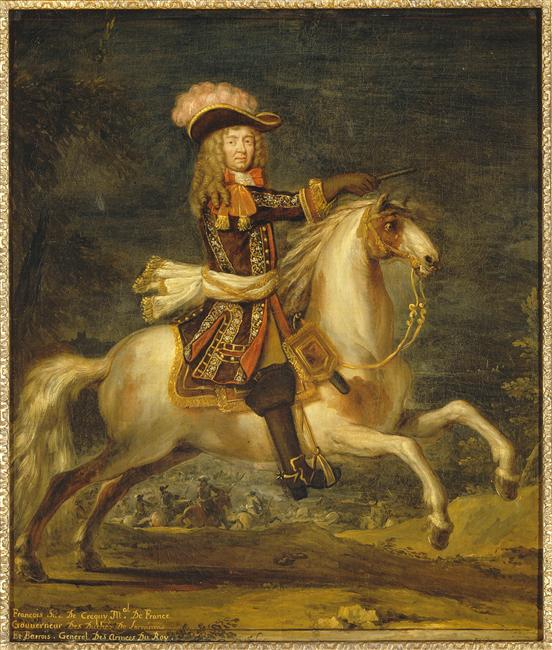
François de Créquy, French commander in the Rhineland 1676-1678

In the 1667-1668 War of Devolution, France captured most of the Spanish Netherlands and Franche-Comté, before the Triple Alliance of the Dutch Republic, England and Sweden forced them to relinquish most of these gains in the 1668 Treaty of Aix-la-Chapelle. Angered by what Louis XIV viewed as Dutch ingratitude for previous French support, in May 1672 French forces invaded the Dutch Republic.

They initially seemed to have achieved an overwhelming victory but by late July, the Dutch position had stabilised and they received support from Brandenburg-Prussia, Emperor Leopold and the Spanish Empire. This was formalised by the August 1673 Treaty of the Hague, which opened a new front in the Rhineland; despite being outnumbered, poor co-ordination between the Imperial armies and the skill of Turenne's skill allowed the French to retain the vital territory of Alsace.

Turenne's death at Salzbach in 1675 forced the French onto the defensive and in September 1676, the Imperialists regained Philippsburg and control of the Rhine crossing at Strasbourg. During 1677, the new French commander de Créquy prevented them invading Alsace by astute manoeuvring; he won a minor battle at Kochersberg in October and then captured Freiburg im Breisgau.

With peace negotiations nearing completion at Nijmegen, Louis planned a rapid campaign in March and April 1678 to strengthen his position in the Spanish Netherlands, remaining on the defensive elsewhere. De Créquy was instructed not to seek battle and ensure the retention of Freiburg; despite his successful defence of Alsace, Louis had limited confidence in him due to his defeat at Konzer Brücke in 1675 and subsequent loss of Trier. While an apparently minor defeat, it clearly rankled, since it was specifically mentioned in the eulogy delivered at Louis' funeral in 1715.

In the spring of 1678, de Créquy concentrated his forces at Scherwiller, where he was reinforced by the Army of the Moselle under Schomberg. Charles of Lorraine began assembling an army of 30,000 outside Offenburg, intending to re-capture Freiburg and in late June, de Créquy sought to divert him by moving against Rheinfelden, now in Switzerland. Charles despatched Starhemberg and 7,000 men to its relief but the French caught them crossing the river, inflicting 3,000 casualties, many drowned, and taking 800 prisoners. After this success, Louis gave de Créquy permission to attack the main Imperial force, if he saw an opportunity to do so.

== Battle ==
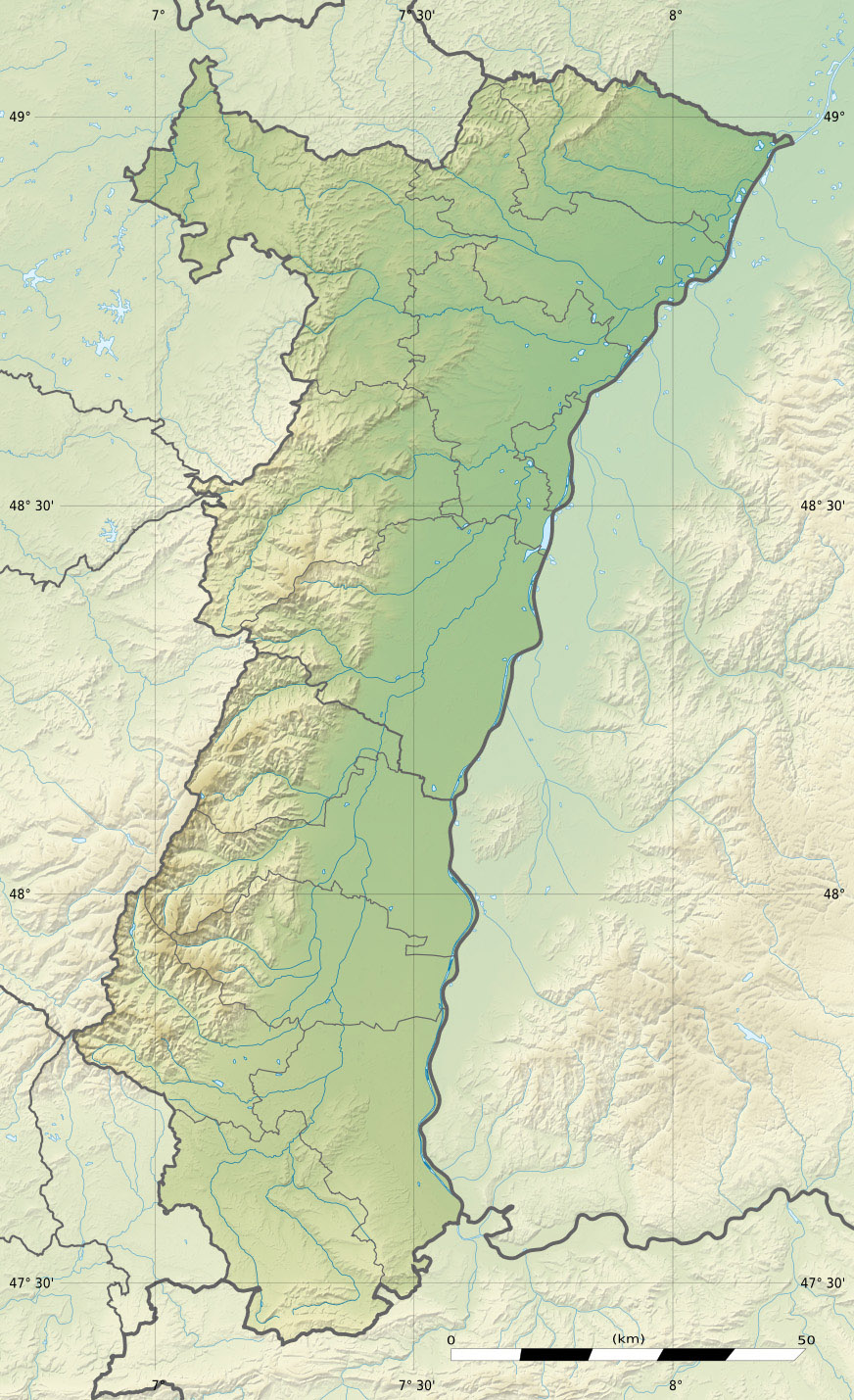
The 1678 campaign in Alsace; note, the Rhine is marked by the modern French-German border

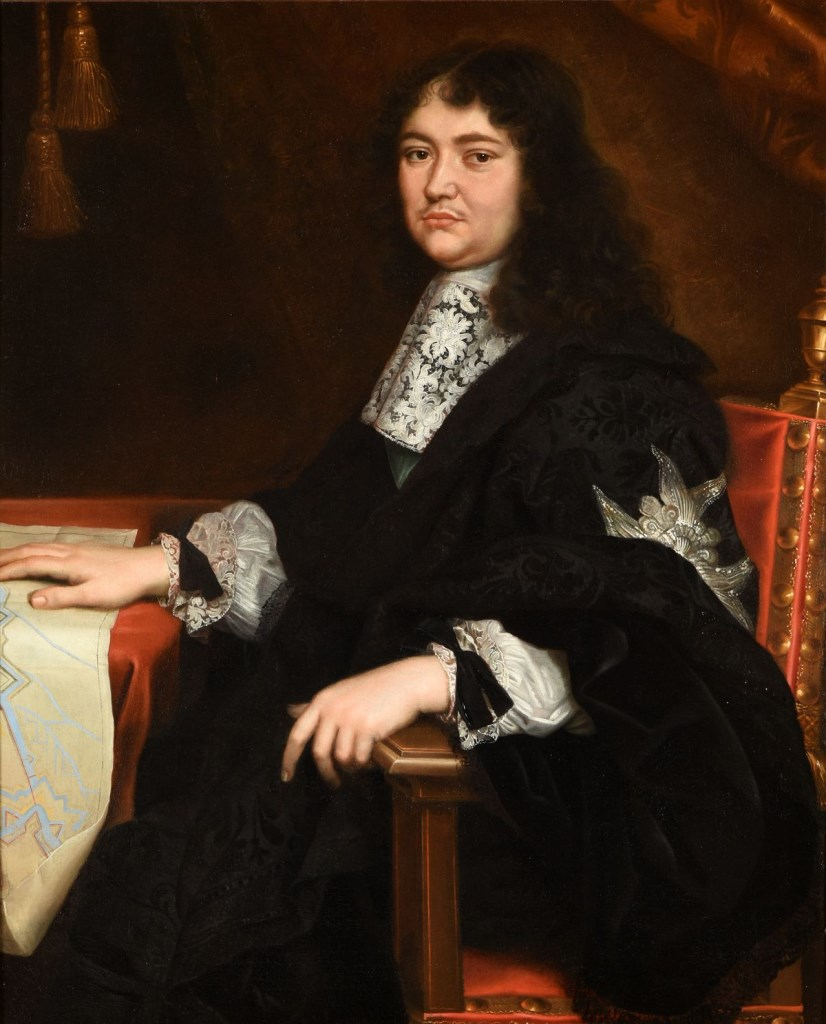
The Marquis de Louvois; the campaign illustrates the benefits provided to French military commanders by his highly efficient logistics support

Throughout the war, the logistics support designed by Louvois allowed French armies to move faster and open campaigns much earlier, even during the winter, when armies traditionally halted operations due to lack of forage for cavalry and transport. This was enhanced by a systematic policy of denying supplies to the enemy through blockades and the destruction of towns, villages and farms.

Their comparative advantage was particularly marked in the Rhineland, due to the weakness of the Imperial system and their armies' dependence on proximity to the Rhine for resupply. In May 1677, the English envoy in Vienna reported Charles of Lorraine was short of ammunition and his troops unable to survive more than three days away from the river.

In the 1677 campaign, the Imperialists sustained severe losses from disease and hunger due to the strain placed on their supply lines by constant marching and counter-marching; Freiburg was captured in November because they were incapable of defending it. De Créquy now repeated this strategy; leaving Choiseul at Rheinfelden to reduce the remaining Imperial strongpoints and burn down Bad Säckingen, he returned to Bad Krozingen, 15 kilometres south-west of Freiburg. By mid July, most of the Imperial army was spread out between the villages of Gengenbach and Lahr, with forward elements at Denzlingen (see Map).

As in the previous year, the Imperial army began to disintegrate due to disease and desertion forcing Charles to withdraw behind the Kinzig, a tributary of the Rhine providing a natural defence barrier in front of Offenburg. On 23 July, the French attempted to cross it but were prevented from doing so by the Imperial cavalry; this is the encounter known as the Battle of Ortenbach. Charles refused to commit his forces to a general engagement and retreated to Oberkirch but at the price of being cut off from the Rhine; on 27 July, de Créquy captured Kehl, its bridge over the Rhine and the associated fort of Etoile.

Both the Dutch Republic and Spain had ended the war by mid-August but Emperor Leopold continued to delay in the hope of regaining some of his losses. Charles crossed back onto the left back of the Rhine at Philippsburg but found de Créquy once again blocking his advance. In late September, he admitted defeat and withdrew to the Electoral Palatinate, which ended the campaign.

== Aftermath ==
In the January 1679 Treaty of Nijmegen, France retained Kehl and Freiburg-im-Breisgau; Emperor Leopold then further damaged relationships with his German allies by unsuccessfully demanding he be granted the Free Imperial Cities of Gengenbach, Zell-am-Harmersbach and Offenburg as 'compensation.'

As the entry point into Alsace, Louis decided Strasbourg had to be annexed; de Créquy's 1678 campaign allowed him to blockade the city if needed and on 30 September 1681, French troops occupied the city. French possession of Strasbourg was confirmed by the 1697 Treaty of Ryswick but in return they withdrew from territories on the right bank of the Rhine, including Kehl and Freiburg.

== Sources ==
- Black, Jeremy (2011). Beyond the Military Revolution: War in the Seventeenth Century World. Palgrave Macmillan. ISBN 978-0230251564.;
- De Périni, Hardÿ (1896). Batailles françaises, Volume V. Ernest Flammarion, Paris.;
- Lynn, John (1996). The Wars of Louis XIV, 1667-1714 (Modern Wars In Perspective). Longman. ISBN 978-0582056299.;
- Massillon, François, Aizpurua, Paul (2004). Oraison funèbre de Louis XIV: 1715. Editions Jérôme Millon. ISBN 978-2841371587.;
- Wagner, André. "Les années Vauban à Haguenau". Archeographe, 2008.;
- Wilson, Peter (1998). German Armies: War and German Society, 1648-1806. Routledge. ISBN 978-1857281064.;
- Young, William (2004). International Politics and Warfare in the Age of Louis XIV and Peter the Great. iUniverse. ISBN 978-0595329922.
