= Siege of Philippsburg (1644) =

1644 battle during the Thirty Years' War

- Part of the Thirty Years' War
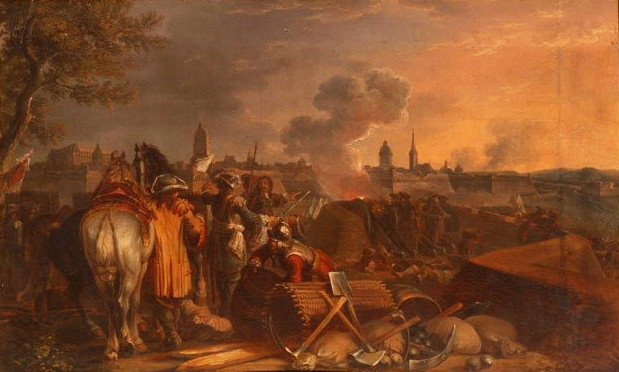
- Painting of the siege by Jean-Baptiste Le Paon (1769)
Date	25 August – 12 September 1644 (2 weeks and 4 days)
Location	Philippsburg, Prince-Bishopric of Speyer, Holy Roman Empire, (present-day Germany) 49.2370°N 8.4548°E
Result	French victory

Belligerents
France	Holy Roman Empire

Commanders and leaders
(Kingdom of France) Duc d'Enghien (Kingdom of France) Vicomte de Turenne (Kingdom of France) Duc de Gramont	(Holy Roman Empire) Caspar Baumberger

Strength
5,000 men	500 men

The siege of Philippsburg (25 August – 12 September 1644) was a French siege of the Rhine fortress of Philippsburg during the Thirty Years' War. After the battle of Freiburg in early August, the French under the Duc d'Enghien refrained from attacking the city and marched north to besiege the imperial-held Philippsburg instead. The place fell after a two-week siege.

With Philippsburg and the subsequent capture of Mainz, the French took control of the northern Rhine valley, enabling them to launch offensives into the interior of Germany and against Bavaria, the emperor's most important ally. Afterwards, the Bavarian Elector Maximilian believed that the war could no longer be won by military means and urged Emperor Ferdinand III to conclude a separate peace with France.

== Prelude ==
Philippsburg Fortress, named after Speyer's Prince-Bishop Philipp Christoph von Sötern, had been built in the former village of Udenheim because the bishop felt threatened by his Protestant neighbours, the Margraviate of Baden-Durlach and the Electoral Palatinate. Both foiled the first attempts of Sötern to fortify the place in 1618. In autumn 1621, the Protestant mercenaries of Ernst von Mansfeld pillaged the area. Sötern was too weak to resist Mansfeld's army, so he retreated with his few men to Udenheim that he fortified again. The Catholic victories at Wimpfen and Höchst in 1622 allowed Sötern to finish the construction until spring 1623.

Soon, Prince-Bishop and Archbishop-Elector of Trier Philipp Christoph fell out with Spain which occupied parts of the Electoral Palatinate around Frankenthal to secure the Spanish road, its critical military route to the Netherlands during the Eighty Years' War. Out of fear of military occupation by Spain, Bishop Sötern instead sought support from France. When a second threat approached by the rapid advance of Protestant Sweden in 1632, Sötern tried to hand over his fortresses Ehrenbreitstein and Philippsburg to France. While Ehrenbreitstein was successfully handed over, Philippsburg's commander Caspar Baumberger refused and continued to hold the fortress in the name of Emperor Ferdinand II. The Swedes captured it in January 1634 with the help of their German allies but it was recaptured by Caspar Baumberger in a surprise attack one year later.

Sötern's imprisonment by Spanish troops in March 1635 was used as a pretext for France to declare war on Spain and actively enter the war on the Swedish side. France needed to gain access over the Rhine so that its troops were able to operate and to be supplied within the Empire. However, they lost their bridgehead at Ehrenbreitstein in 1637, leaving the Middle Rhine in Imperial control. Only Bernard of Saxe-Weimar's successes in 1638 obtained France the principal fortress of Breisach at the Upper Rhine. From there, French troops still needed to cross the Black Forest to threaten the Emperor and his Bavarian allies.

France was unable to further advance until 1643, when an offensive led by Jean-Baptiste Budes, Comte de Guébriant conquered Rottweil after two sieges; Guébriant was mortally wounded in the second. His successor Josias Rantzau was surprised by the Bavarians under Franz von Mercy in his winter quarters at Tuttlingen in November 1643. The Bavarians captured him and shattered his army. The next year, Mercy went into the offensive, retaking the previous French conquests Überlingen at Lake Constance in May and Freiburg im Breisgau in July. The French army, rebuilt by the Vicomte de Turenne, was first able to counter Mercy when reinforced by the Duc d'Enghien at the end of July 1644, few days after the fall of Freiburg. Both attacked Mercy's army in front of Freiburg on 3 August but were repulsed with heavy losses over three days. Mercy only withdrew when the French bypassed Freiburg from the north to threaten his supply lines on 9 August.

== Siege ==
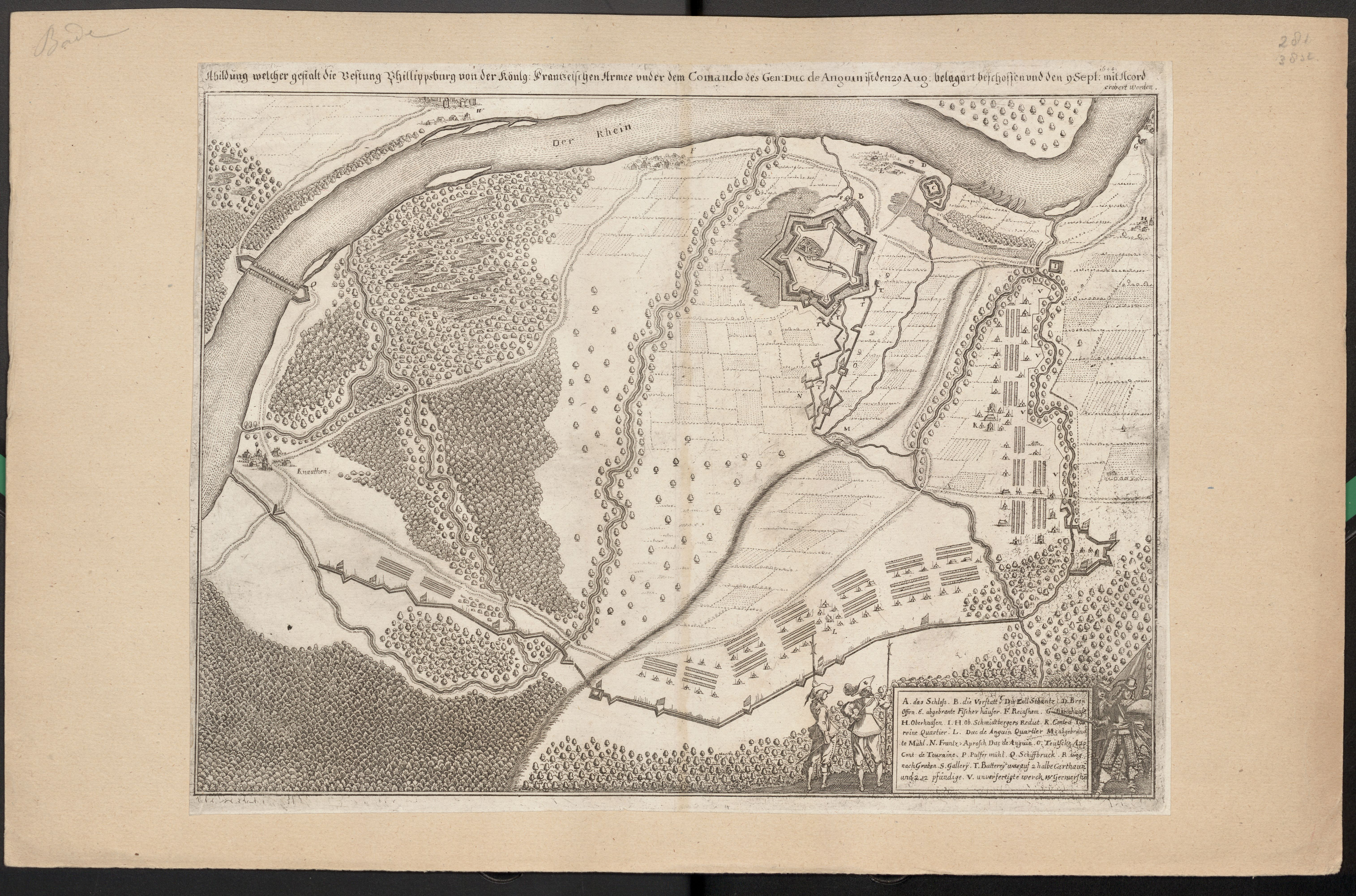
Plan of the siege

Turenne convinced d'Enghien not to try retaking Freiburg but instead to march north to besiege Philippsburg. The Weimar cavalry in French service under Taupadel and Rosen swept through Baden, followed by the French infantry. Most of the French army occupied the area between the Rhine, the Black Forest and Odenwald. Only 5,000 men were used to encircle and invest Philippsburg, arriving on 25 August. The Imperial garrison with 500 men under Baumberger had 100 cannons in its arsenal, but not enough personnel and space to use more than a few at the same time. Also, the marshes that protected the fortress had been dried by a hot summer. Baumberger was not very confident in his men and gave up the redoubt northwest of the fortress on 26 August to concentrate on the defence of the core fortress. D'Enghien initially focused on building a circumvallation to cover the siege works against a possible relief attempt by Mercy.

The latter had marched a parallel route east of the Black Forest from Villingen via Tübingen to Neckarsulm. There he awaited Imperial reinforcements by Count Hatzfeld and sent a cavalry detachment with more than 1000 men under Johann von Werth to interfere with d'Enghien's plans. The besiegers were able to fill up the enemy ditch and dig their trenches despite one successful sortie of the garrison by 300 foot soldiers and 100 horsemen on 26 August. The French artillery under Turenne established its artillery emplacements on 30 August and started shelling the walls. The Imperials could only use three guns at once on each flank that were repeatedly destroyed by Turenne's cannons, but each time replaced by spare ones from the arsenal. Baumberger was convinced he could not hold Philippsburg any longer and offered capitulation on 9 September, just a day after Mercy had united his force with Hatzfeld. On 12 September, Baumberger left the fortress with the remaining garrison and 2 guns.

== Aftermath ==
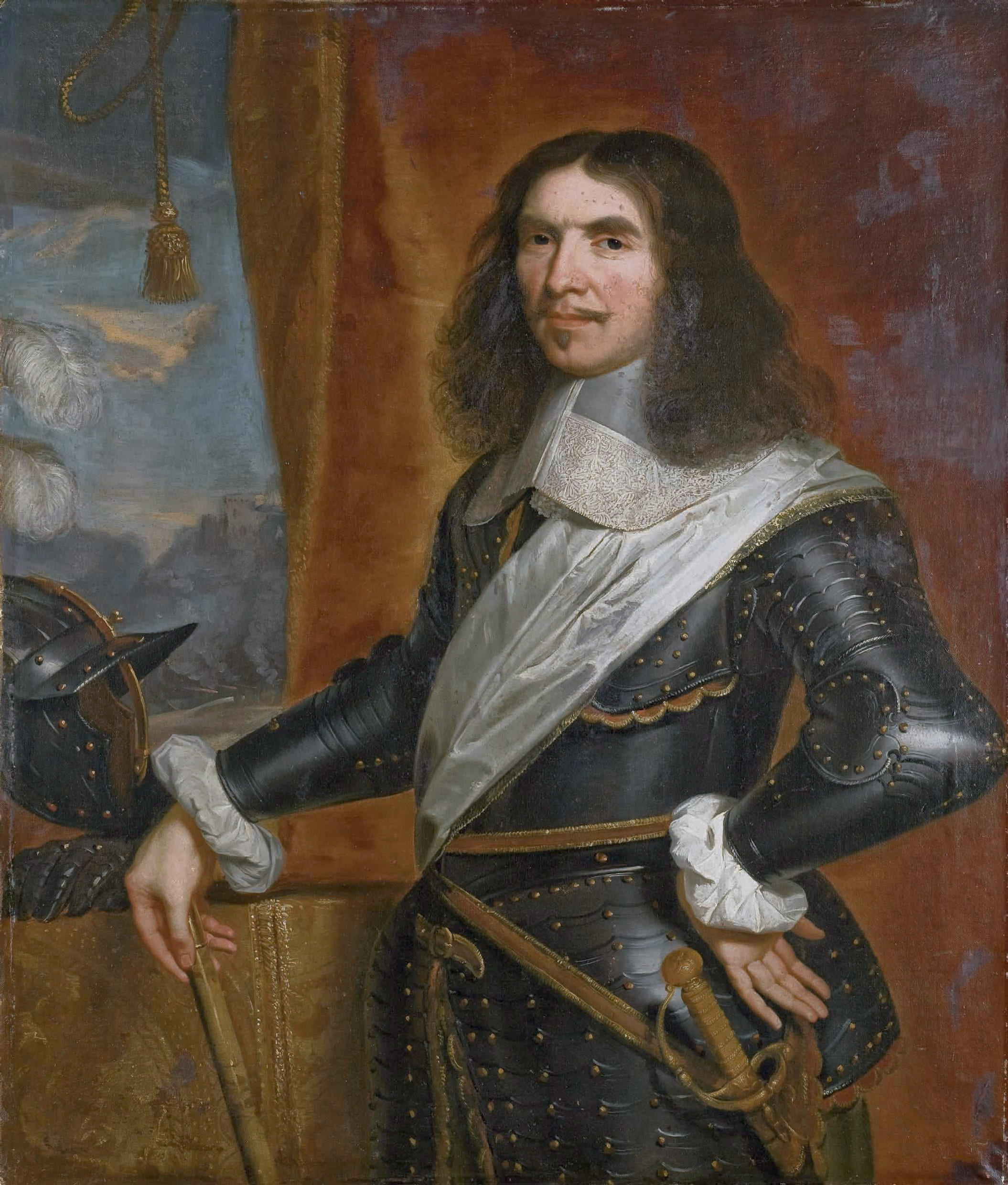
French general Henri de Turenne conquered the northern Rhine valley

From Philippsburg, French troops crossed the Rhine and took most hostile garrisons on the left bank, including Worms, Oppenheim, Mainz and Landau but not the Spanish Frankenthal. Only the Lorraine garrison of Landau resisted for 5 days, the other towns surrendered without a fight. After Mainz's Elector Anselm Casimir had fled to Ehrenbreitstein, the cathedral chapter capitulated on 17 September and handed Mainz over to the French, against the will of the 800-strong imperial garrison and although 700 reinforcements had already arrived from Mercy's army under Obrist Wolf. Thereby, France had attained an accessible route into Germany north of the mountainous Black Forest, facilitating offensives against Bavaria. It also left Duke Charles of Lorraine fully isolated from his allies in his war against France. He lost his last strongholds in Lorraine with La Mothe in 1645 and Longwy in 1646.

Although Mercy recovered Mannheim and Höchst in late autumn 1644 and cleared the right bank of the Rhine from French garrisons except Philippsburg, his sovereign Maximilian of Bavaria was convinced afterwards that the war could no longer be won militarily. Therefore, Maximilian henceforth urged the Emperor to make a separate peace with France. Nevertheless, he supported him in the defence of Bohemia against the Swedes, which was almost defenceless due to the disintegration of Matthias Gallas's main Imperial army. In winter, Hatzfeldt's Imperials and Werth marched off to Bohemia with more than 5000 Bavarians. Defeated at Jankau in March 1645, Werth returned with only 1,500 men. Turenne used the opportunity for an early offensive into Swabia but was stopped in a surprise Bavarian assault at Herbsthausen in May. When he advanced again together with D'Enghien, the Battle of Alerheim took place in August, in which Mercy fell. Troops of the Emperor, although themselves under pressure by the Swedes along the Danube, had to come to the aid of the Bavarians and pushed the French back to Philippsburg in October.

In response to French pressure, Emperor Ferdinand III agreed to set Archbishop-Elector Sötern free in April 1645 on the condition he would take Philippsburg from France and hand it back to the Emperor. For Sötern however, the conditions had only been means to an end; he even signed a treaty with France on 19 July 1646 that allowed them to permanently garrison the fortress. French possession of Philippsburg was confirmed in the Peace of Westphalia in 1648, it took until 1676 for Imperial troops to reconquer it. Philippsburg, conquered again in 1688 and 1734, was considered by Carl von Clausewitz to be a "model of a badly situated fortress" because it was too far from the Rhine to benefit from its proximity, but still close enough for the river to limit its effect.

== Bibliography ==
- Albrecht, Dieter (1998). Maximilian I. von Bayern 1573 – 1651 (in German). München: R. Oldenbourg. ISBN 3-486-56334-3.
- Clausewitz, Carl von (1867). Vom Kriege. Zweiter Teil (in German). Berlin: Dümmler.
- Guthrie, William P. (2003). The Later Thirty Years War: From the Battle of Wittstock to the Treaty of Westphalia. Greenwood Press.
- Höbelt, Lothar (2016). Von Nördlingen bis Jankau: Kaiserliche Strategie und Kriegsführung 1634-1645 (in German). Wien: Heeresgeschichtliches Museum. ISBN 978-3902551733.
- Schott, Rudolf (1978). "Die Kämpfe vor Freiburg im Breisgau, die Eroberung von Philippsburg und die Belagerungen mehrerer Städte am Rhein im Jahre 1644". Militärgeschichtliche Zeitschrift (in German). 24 (2): 9–22. doi:10.1524/mgzs.1978.24.2.9.
- Wagner, Paul (1888). "Philipp Christoph v. Sötern" . Allgemeine Deutsche Biographie (in German). Vol. 26. Leipzig: Duncker & Humblot. pp. 50–69.
- Wilson, Peter H. (2009). Europe's Tragedy: A History of the Thirty Years War. Allen Lane. ISBN 978-0-7139-9592-3.
