= Ernst Starhemberg =

Ernst Starhemberg may refer to:

- Count Ernst Rüdiger von Starhemberg (1638–1701), army commander of Vienna during the second siege of Vienna, imperial general during the Great Turkish War and President of the Hofkriegsrat
- Ernst Rüdiger Starhemberg (1899–1956), Austrian nationalist politician
