= Battle of Vác =

The Battle of Vác may refer to:

- Battle of Vác (1684)
- Battle of Vác (1849)
