= Siege of Buda (1686) =

1686 siege of the Great Turkish War

- Part of the Great Turkish War
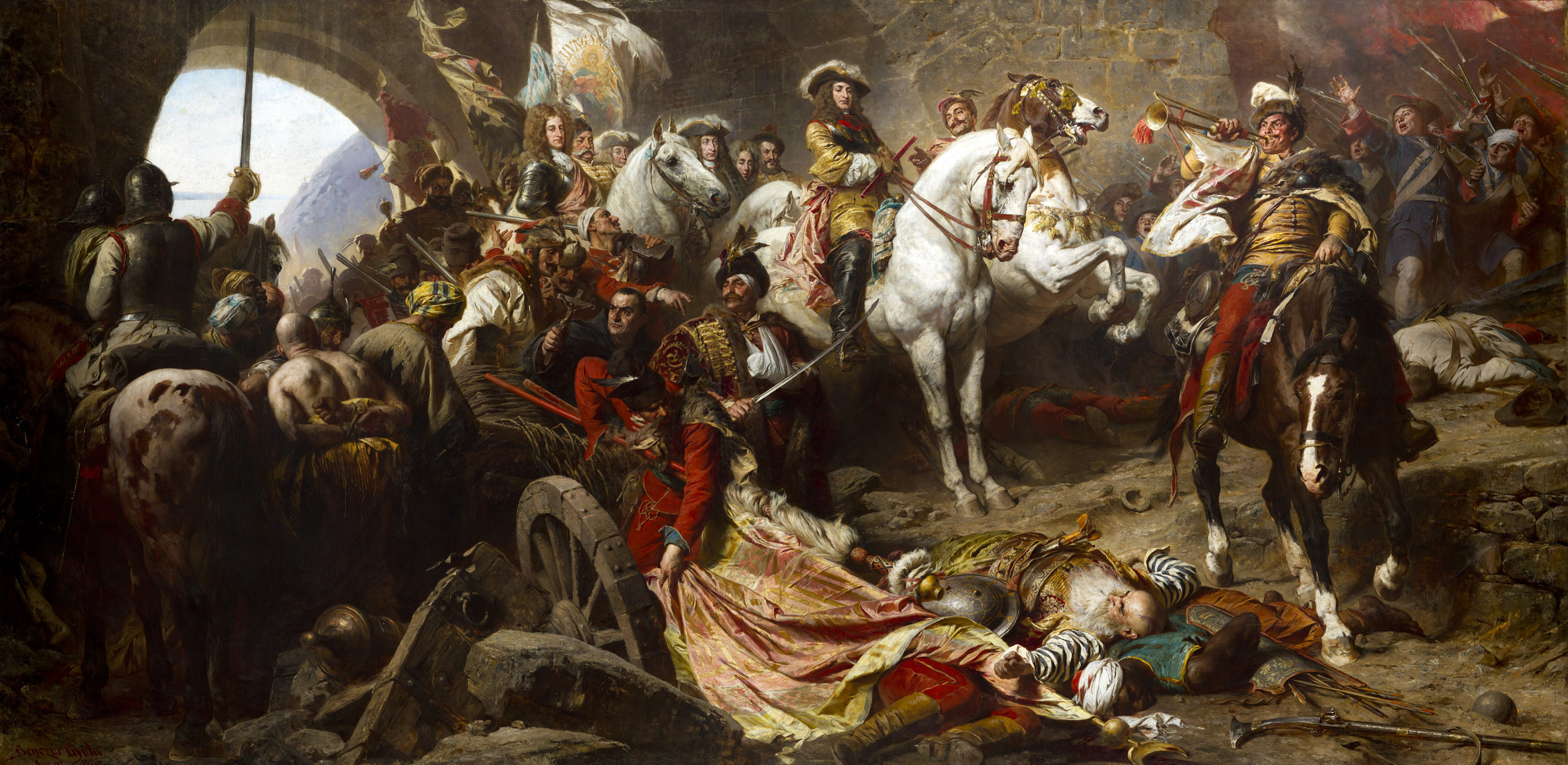
- The Siege of Buda Castle in 1686; Gyula Benczúr, 1896
Date	18 June – 9 September 1686
Location	Buda, Ottoman Hungary (now part of Budapest, Hungary) 47.502800°N 19.031700°E
Result	Holy League victory

Belligerents
Holy League	Ottoman Empire

Commanders and leaders
Charles V, Duke of Lorraine; Louis William, Margrave of Baden-Baden; Paul I, Prince Esterházy; Ernst Rüdiger von Starhemberg (WIA); Manuel López de Zúñiga †	Abdurrahman Abdi Arnavut Pasha †; Sarı Süleyman Paşa; Pasha of Temeşvar; Pasha of İstolni Belgrad; Pasha of Osijek

Strength
65,000–100,000	Garrison: under 7,000 (including 3,000 Janissaries, 1,000 cavalry, and civilians); Relief army: ~40,000

Casualties and losses
~20,000	~3,000 killed; ~6,000 captured (including civilians)

The siege of Buda (Hungarian: Buda visszafoglalása, lit. 'Recapture of Buda') was a military engagement during the Great Turkish War, in which forces of the Holy League, led by the Habsburg Monarchy, recaptured the fortified city of Buda (now part of modern-day Budapest) from the Ottoman Empire. The siege took place between 18 June and 9 September 1686, ending nearly 150 years of Ottoman sovereignty over the former Hungarian capital.

The campaign followed the failed Ottoman siege of Vienna in 1683 and was part of a broader counteroffensive launched by the Holy League. The coalition army of up to 100,000 men besieged the city for more than two months before storming the defences. The fall of Buda marked a decisive step in the Habsburg consolidation of central Hungary, leading to the recognition of hereditary Habsburg rule by the Hungarian Diet at Pressburg in 1687.

== Background ==
=== Ottoman Buda ===
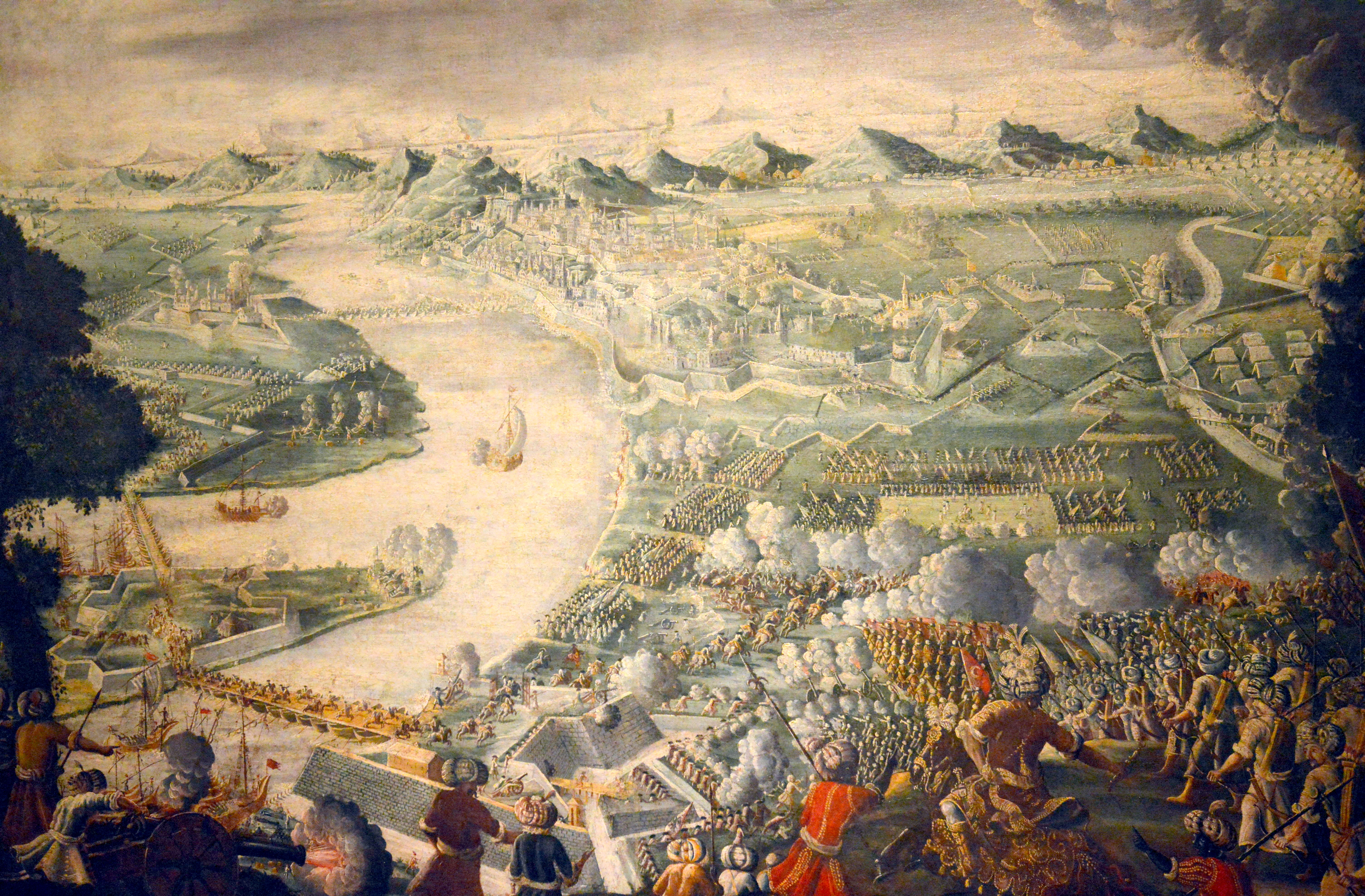
The Holy League took Buda after a long siege in 1686

In 1541, Buda was conquered by the Turks in the siege of Buda, and was under Ottoman rule for the next 145 years. Under Ottoman rule the economic decline of Buda, the capital city of Hungary, was characterized by the stagnation of population. The population of Buda was not larger in 1686 than the population of the city two centuries earlier in the 15th century. The Ottomans allowed the Hungarian royal palace to fall into ruins. The amortized palace was later transformed into a gunpowder storage and magazine by the Ottomans, which caused its detonation during the siege in 1686. The original Christian Hungarian population did not feel secure during the Ottoman conquest, and their numbers significantly shrank in the next decades, because they fled to the Habsburg-ruled Royal Hungary. The number of Jewish and Gypsy immigrants became dominant during the Ottoman rule in Buda. It became an Ottoman cultural and commercial center.

=== Earlier phases of the 1683 war ===
Following the Ottoman failure in the second siege of Vienna, which started the Great Turkish War, Emperor Leopold I saw the opportunity for a counter-strike and the conquest of Hungary, so that the Hungarian capital Buda could be gained from the Ottomans. With the aid of Pope Innocent XI, the Holy League was formed on 5 March 1684, with King Jan Sobieski of Poland, Emperor Leopold I and the Republic of Venice agreeing to an alliance against the Turks.

However, the Holy League's first attempt on Buda ended in defeat, the Austrians and their allies having to withdraw with great losses after 108 days of besieging the Ottoman-held city.

== Siege ==
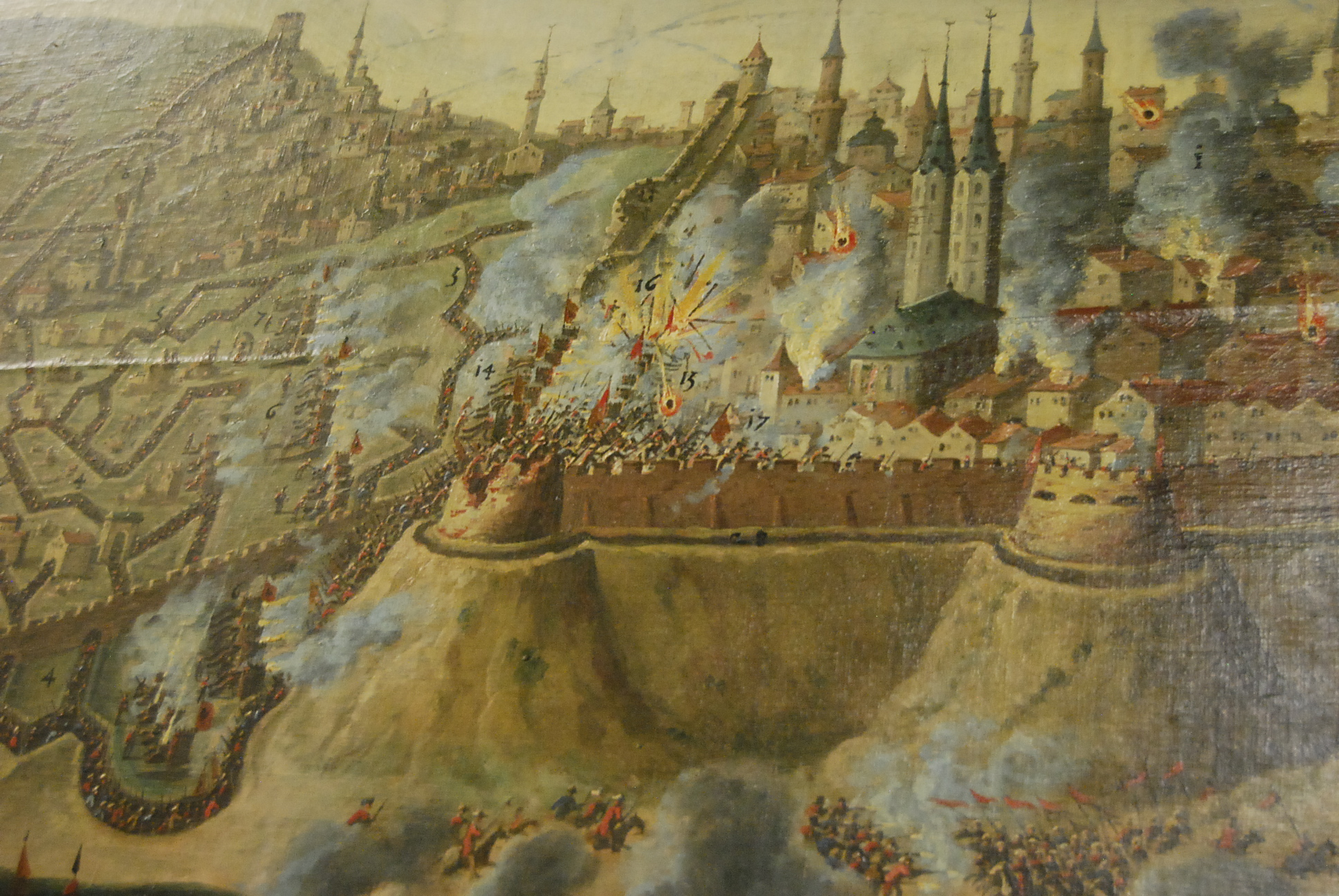
Siege of Buda by Frans Geffels

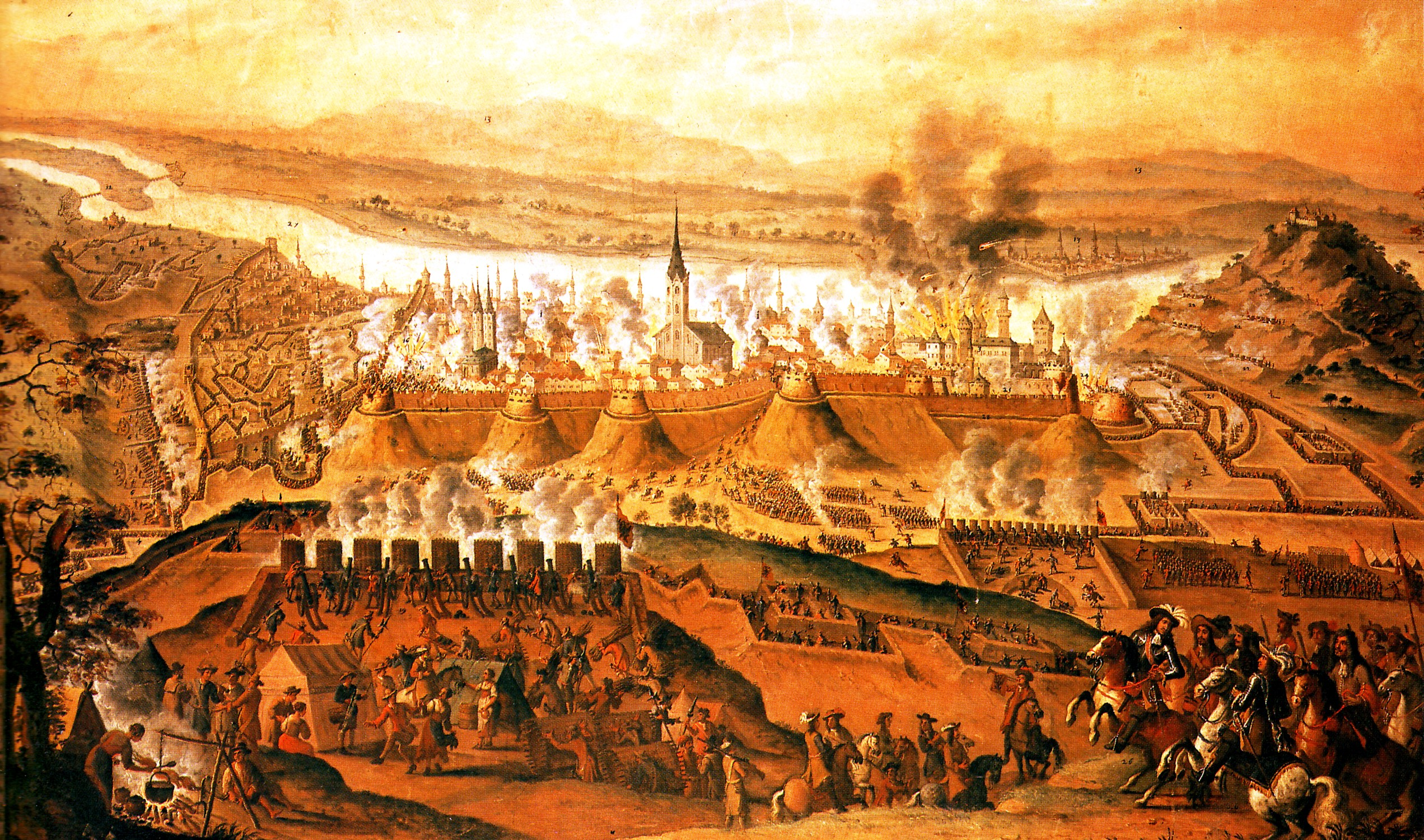
The Siege of Buda in 1686

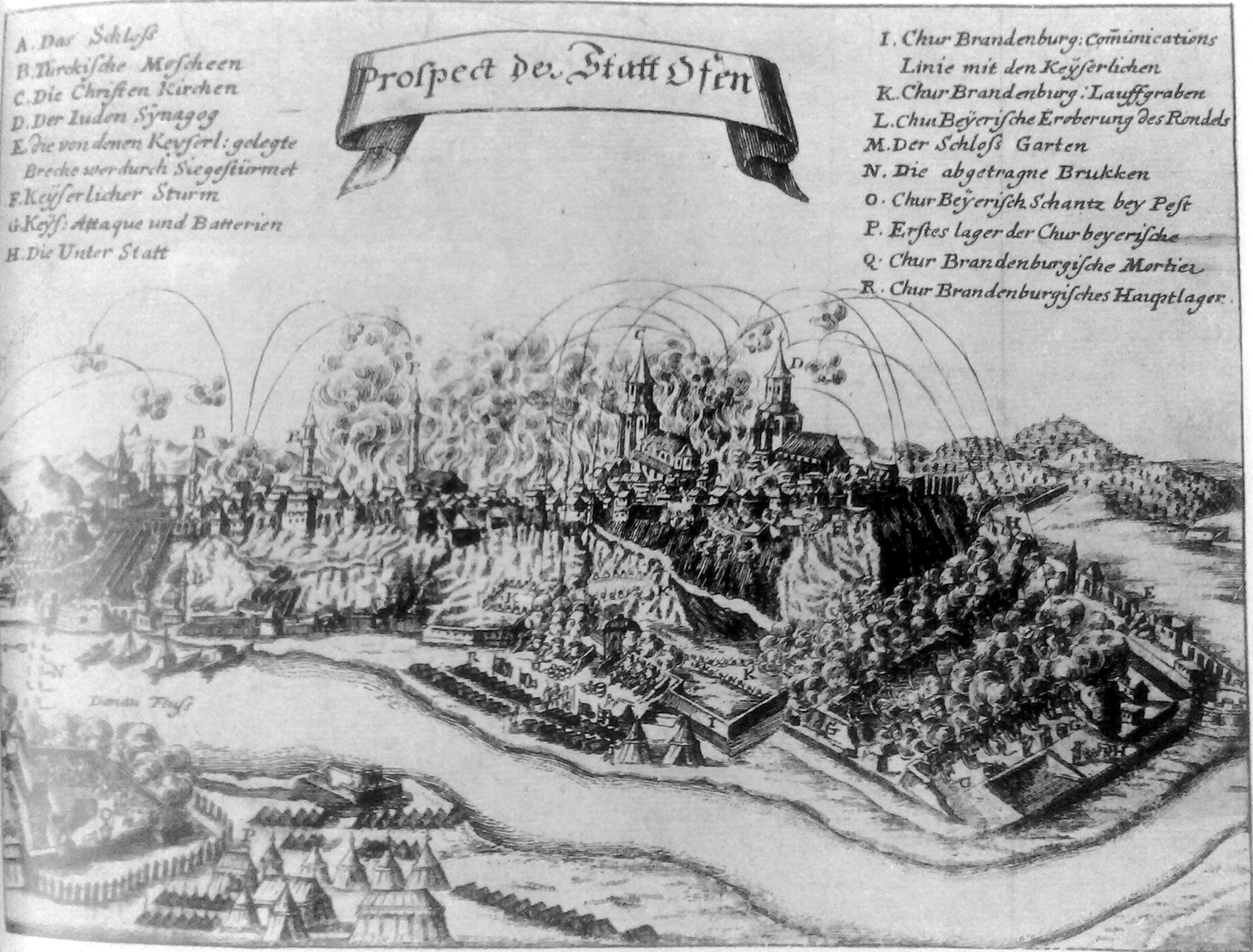
Siege of Buda, 1686, by Johann Azelt

In 1686, two years after the unsuccessful first siege of Buda, a renewed campaign was started to take the city. This time the Holy League's army was much larger, consisting of 65,000-100,000 men, including German, Hungarian, Croat, Dutch, English, Spanish, Czech, Italian, French, Burgundian, Danish and Swedish soldiers, and other Europeans as volunteers, artillerymen and officers. The Turkish defenders consisted of 7,000 men.

By the middle of June 1686 the siege had begun. On 27 July the Holy League's army started a large-scale attack, which was repulsed with a loss of 5,000 men. 300 Spanish soldiers from the Tercio de Flandes spearheaded the assault of the city walls. A Turkish relief army arrived at Buda in the middle of August led by Grand Vizier Sarı Süleyman Paşa, but the besieged Ottoman forces, led by commander Abdurrahman Abdi Arnavut Pasha, were unable to mount any offensive and he was shortly afterwards killed in action. Abdi Pasha's defensive efforts are referred to as "heroic" by Tony Jaques in his book "The Dictionary of Battles and Sieges".

Prince Eugene of Savoy and his dragoons were not directly involved in entering the city but secured the rear of their army against the Turkish relief army, which could not prevent the city from being entered after 145 years in Turkish possession. According to a Hungarian chronicler, the final assault was led by Spanish troops ahead of the Bavarian contingent.

== Massacre of Jews and Muslims ==
The Turks rejected several offers to surrender. After the conquest, the Christian Western European victorious soldiers, enraged by the high number of casualties, took out their fury on the hated "heathens". Knowledge of the Turkish threat was firmly embodied in the consciousness of Europe at that time, fueled by reports of Turkish atrocities against civilians and the religious attitudes of the Christian Church:

Buda was taken and abandoned to plundering. The soldiers committed thereby such excesses. Against the Turks, because of their long and persistent resistance, which had cost an amazing quantity of its comrades their lives, they spared neither age nor sex. The Elector of Bavaria and the Duke of Lorraine, disturbed by knowing of men killed, and women raped, gave good orders that the butchery must stop, and the lives of over 2000 Turks were saved.

Over 3,000 Turks were killed in the slaughter perpetrated by imperial troops, and the violence was directed not only against the Muslims, but likewise against the Jewish population of Buda. As subjects of the Ottoman Empire, who enjoyed greater tolerance under the Ottomans compared to the Habsburgs, the Jews had fought side-by-side with the Turks and were considered their allies. After the conquest of the city, the Jewish community of Buda, which at its height had numbered 3,000 persons, was almost completely destroyed. Approximately half of the city's 1,000 Jews were massacred; hundreds of Jews and 6,000 Muslims were captured to be held for ransom as a "punishment" for their loyalty to the Ottoman Turks. The homes and properties of the Jews were looted and destroyed. The Reformation Hungarian Protestants advocated the complete removal of the Jewish population of Hungary. Most of the Jews remaining in Buda, as well as most of those in the rest of Hungary, left with the retreating Turks. The captured ones were sent to Vienna, Pozsony or Mikulov. The mosques and minarets of Buda were destroyed and three synagogues were burned, along with numerous valuable books, by the Army of the Holy Roman Empire.

The bloodiest events of the siege have been recorded by Johann Dietz of Brandenburg, an army doctor in the besieging army:

. . . Not even the babies in their mother's wombs were spared. All were sent to their deaths. I was quite horrified by what was done here. Men were far more cruel to each other than wild beasts (Bestien).

The imperial troops buried their own dead and threw the dead bodies of the Turks and Jews into the Danube.

== Consequences ==
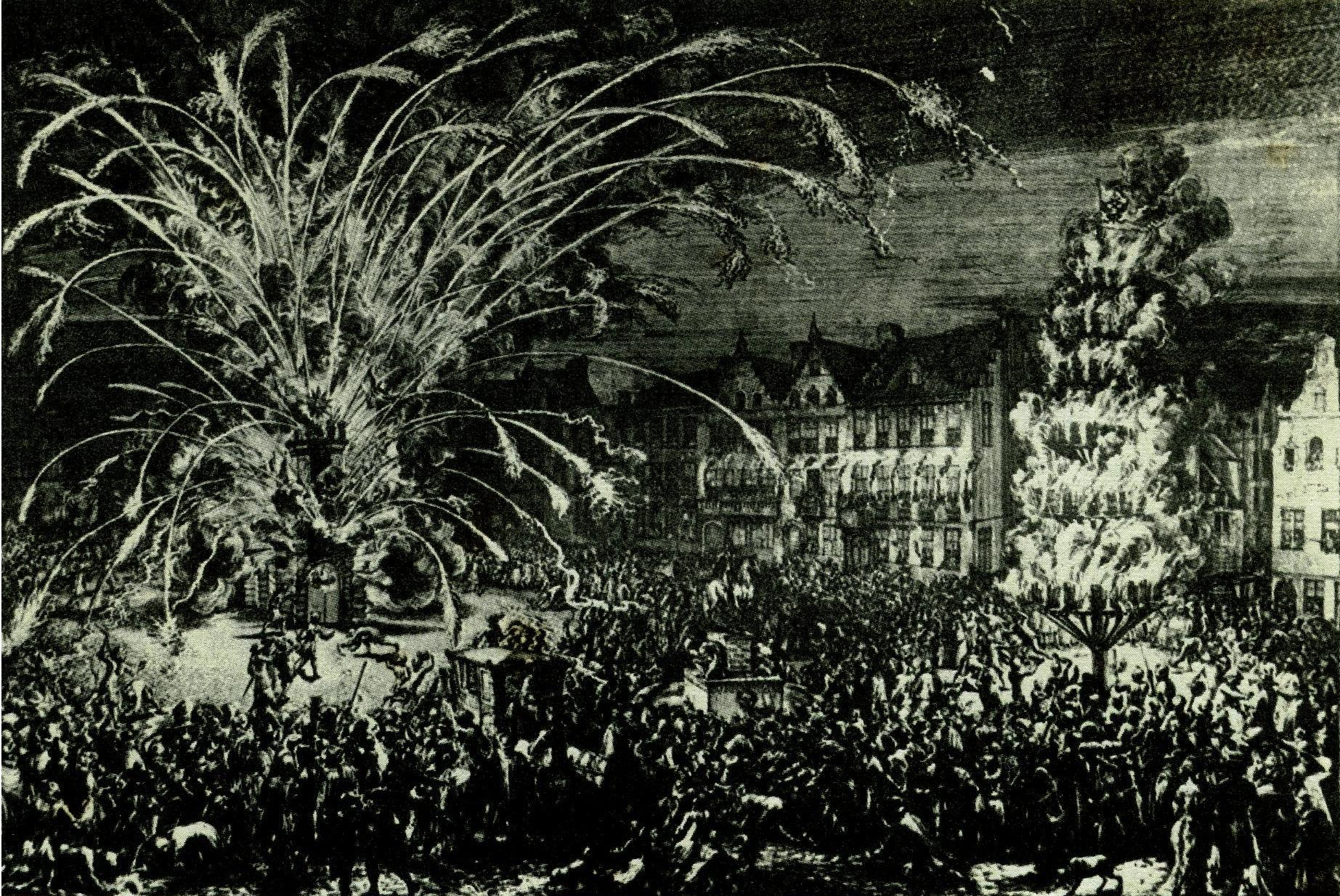
Fireworks in Brussels in commemoration of the recapture of Buda from the Turks in 1686

Buda had been under Ottoman rule for a century and a half, and Ottoman rule had not ended by an uprising of the Hungarians themselves, but by the forceful intervention of the Habsburgs. This fact was reflected in the post-war arrangements.

As a consequence of the recapture of Buda from the Turks, as well as the victory in the Battle of Mohács (1687), the Hungarian parliament recognized at Pressburg in November 1687 that the inheritance of the Hungarian crown had passed to the Habsburgs, without the right to object as well as resist. In addition, the Hungarian parliament committed itself to crown the Habsburg successor to the throne still during his father's lifetime as king of Hungary. Thus on 9 December 1687 Joseph, the nine-year-old son of emperor Leopold, was crowned as a first hereditary king with the Stephanskrone. Hungary was a hereditary country of the Habsburgs and already in June 1688 the "commission for the mechanism of the Kingdom of Hungary" was finally created, in order to create in the country of the Stephanskrone a strong monarchistic government.

== Legacy ==
Today, a monument in Budapest marks the spot where Spanish troops breached the walls to re-take the city from the Ottomans. A plaque honors Catalan soldiers in the Spanish contingent who participated in the siege.

== Bibliography ==
- Bodart, G. (1908). Militär-historisches Kriegs-Lexikon (1618-1905).
- Wheatcroft, Andrew (2008). The Enemy at the Gate: Habsburgs, Ottomans and the Battle for Europe. New York: Basic Books. ISBN 978-0-465-01374-6.
