= Philippsburg =

- Town
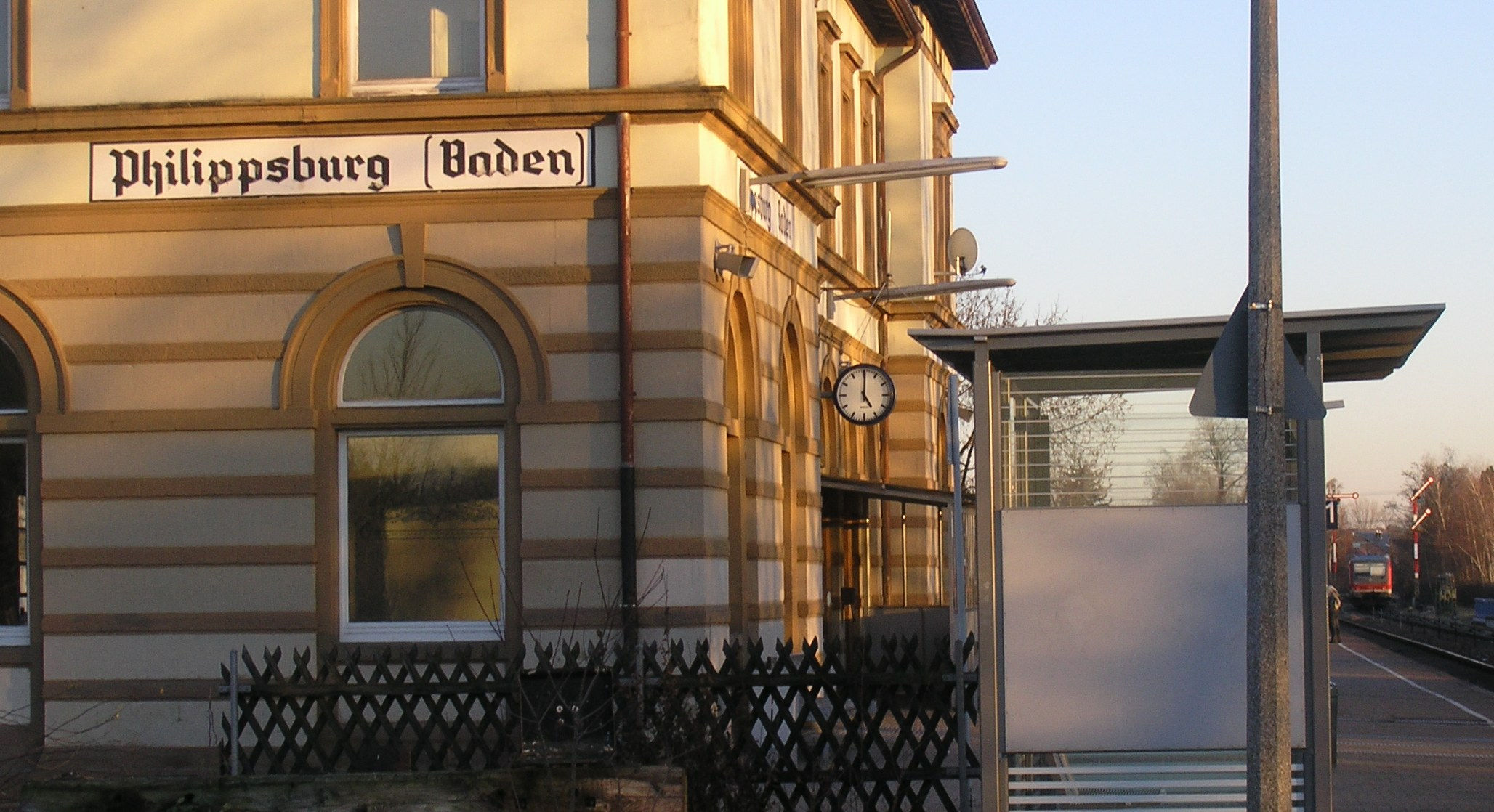

- Coat of arms

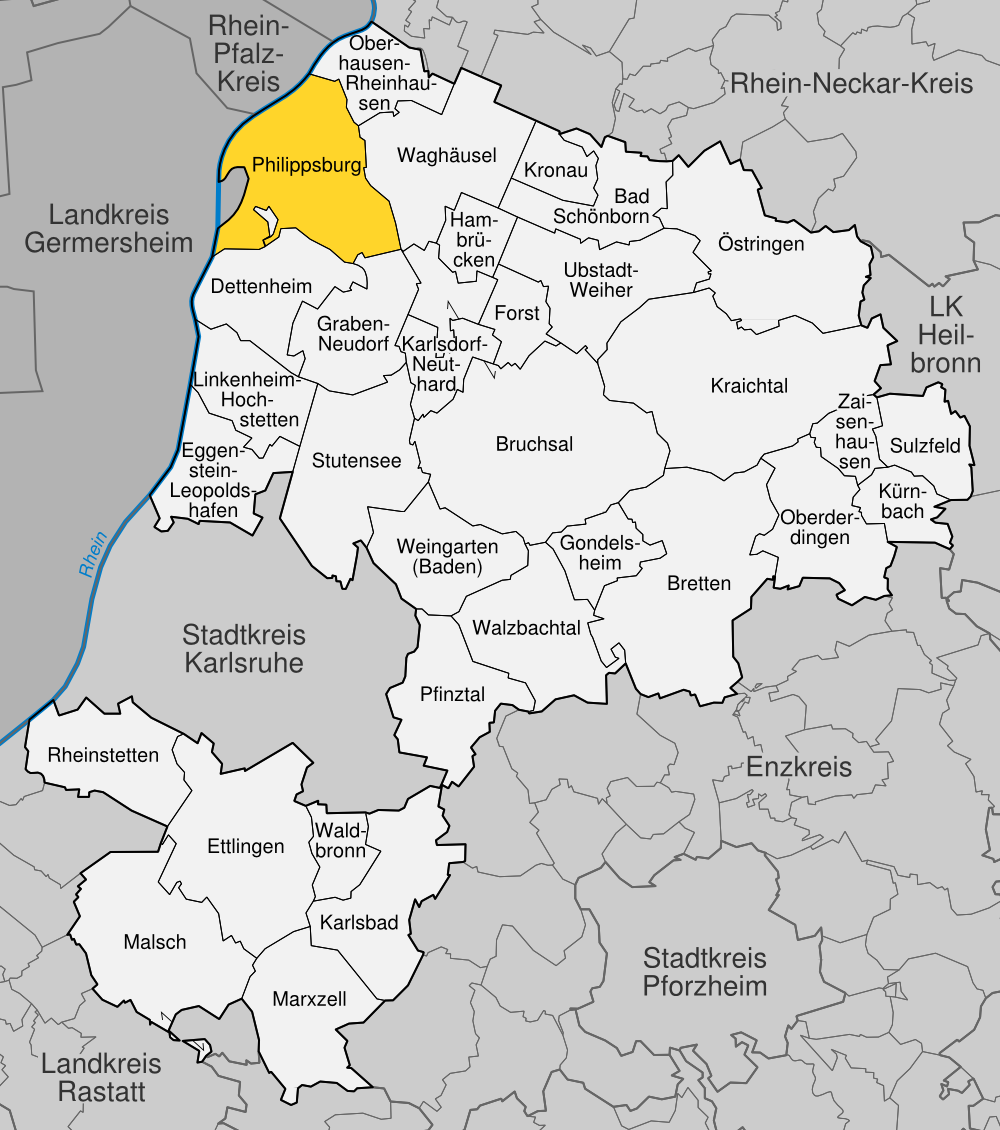
- Location of Philippsburg within Karlsruhe district
- Interactive map of Philippsburg
- Location within Germany Location within Baden-Württemberg
- Coordinates: 49°14′N 08°27′E
- Country: Germany
- State: Baden-Württemberg
- Admin. region: Karlsruhe
- District: Karlsruhe

Government
  - Mayor (2021–29): Stefan Martus

Area
  - Total: 50.54 km^{2} (19.51 sq mi)
- Elevation: 100 m (330 ft)

Population (2025-12-31)
  - Total: 13,765
  - Density: 272.4/km^{2} (705.4/sq mi)
- Time zone: UTC+01:00 (CET)
  - Summer (DST): UTC+02:00 (CEST)
- Postal codes: 76661
- Dialling codes: 07256
- Vehicle registration: KA
- Website: www.philippsburg.de

Philippsburg (German pronunciation: [ˈfɪlɪpsbʊʁk]) is a town in the district of Karlsruhe, Baden-Württemberg, Germany.

== History ==
Before 1623, Philippsburg was known as "Udenheim".

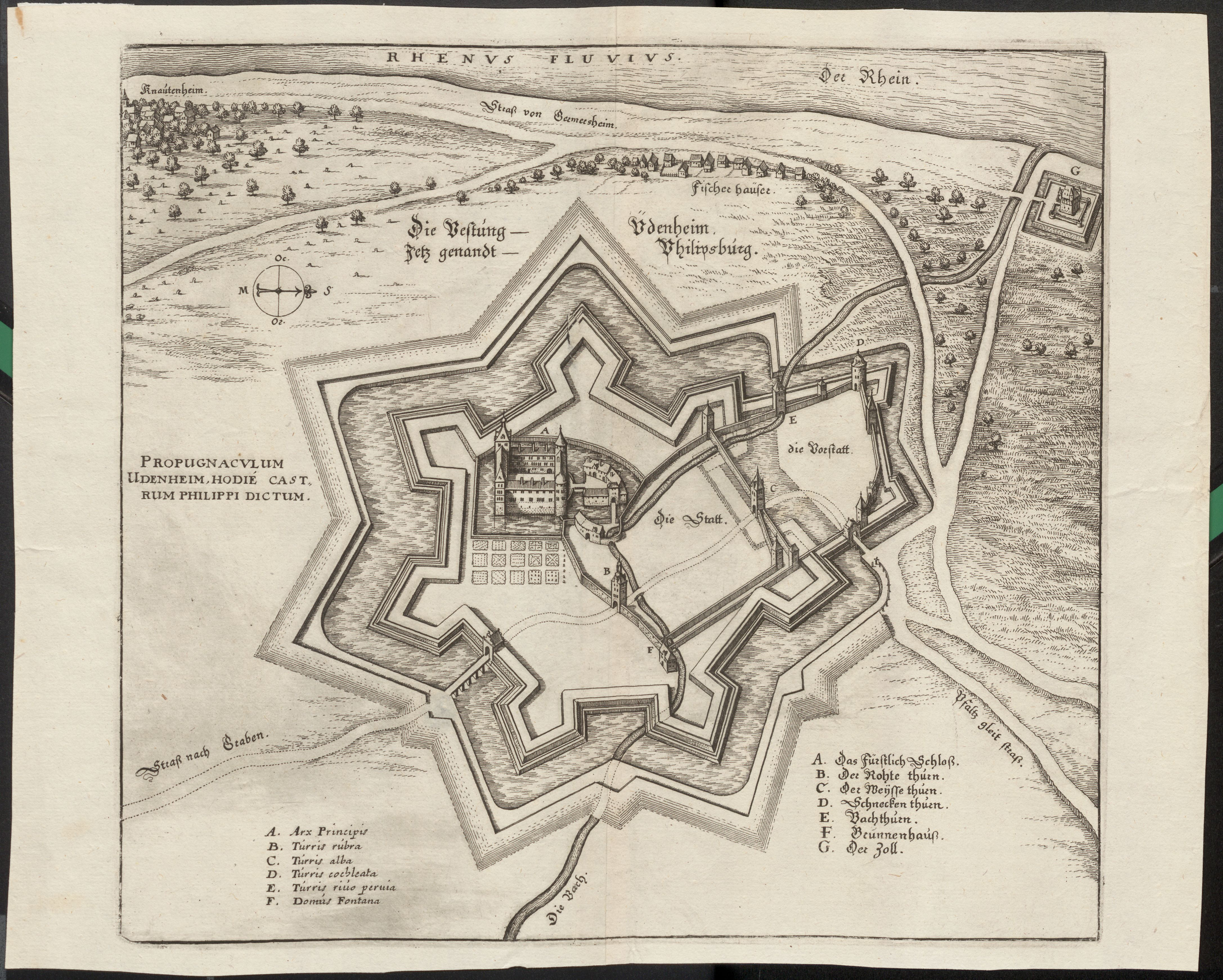
Fortress of Udenheim 1615

The city was a possession of the Bishop of Speyer from 1316 to 1803. The town is named after Philipp Christoph von Sötern, who was bishop from 1610–1652. It was ruled by France between 1644 and 1676 and again between 1688 and 1697. The city became part of the Grand Duchy of Baden in 1803.

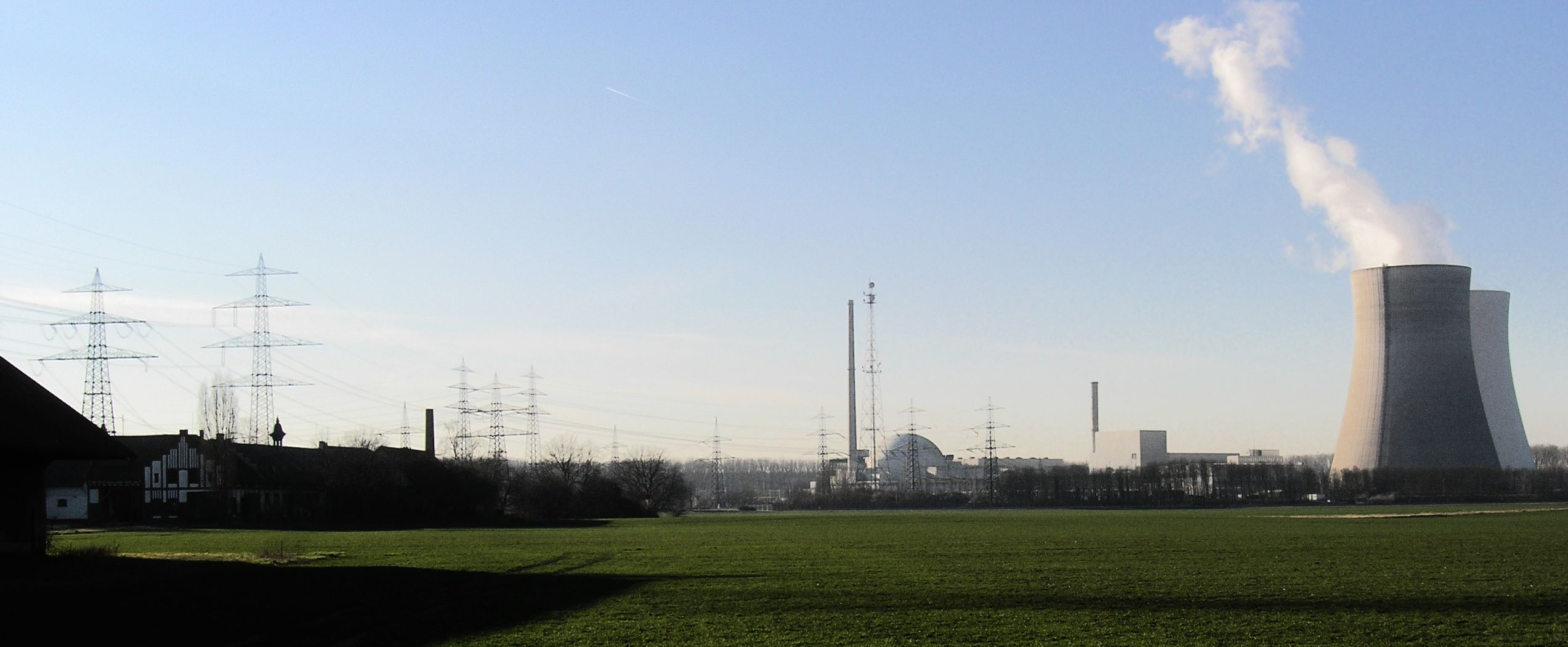
Farm and power plant

Historically, possession of the town was disputed between Germany and France. Formerly, there was a fortress located at the town, whose location was mentioned by Carl von Clausewitz. In Book VI of On War, he suggested that "If a fortress cannot be located directly on a river, it is better not to place it in the immediate vicinity, but some fifty to sixty miles away; otherwise the river will cut through and interfere with its sphere of influence with respect to all the points mentioned above." He then mentions in a footnote "Philippsburg was a perfect example of how not to site a fortress. Its location was that of an idiot standing with his nose against the wall.". The fortress was besieged in 1644, 1676, 1688, and 1734, and during the War of the Second Coalition in 1799. Following the Peace of Lunéville, the fortress was demolished.

== Miscellaneous ==
The town is the site of the Philippsburg Nuclear Power Plant and a Goodyear Tire and Rubber Company plant.

== People ==
- Franz Burda (1903–1986), publisher

== Bibliography ==
The siege of Philippsburg is covered in Clausewitz's campaign history.

- Clausewitz, Carl von (2021). The Coalition Crumbles, Napoleon Returns: The 1799 Campaign in Italy and Switzerland, Volume 2. Trans and ed. Nicholas Murray and Christopher Pringle. Lawrence, Kansas: University Press of Kansas. ISBN 978-0-7006-3034-9
