= Siege of Visegrád =

Battle fought between the forces of the Holy Roman Empire and the Ottoman Empire in 1684

- Part of the Great Turkish War
Date	15–18 June 1684
Location	Visegrád, Budin Eyalet
Result	Holy Roman Empire victory

Belligerents
Holy Roman Empire	Ottoman Empire

Commanders and leaders
Duke Charles of Lorraine	Unknown

Strength
Unknown	Unknown

Casualties and losses
Unknown	Unknown

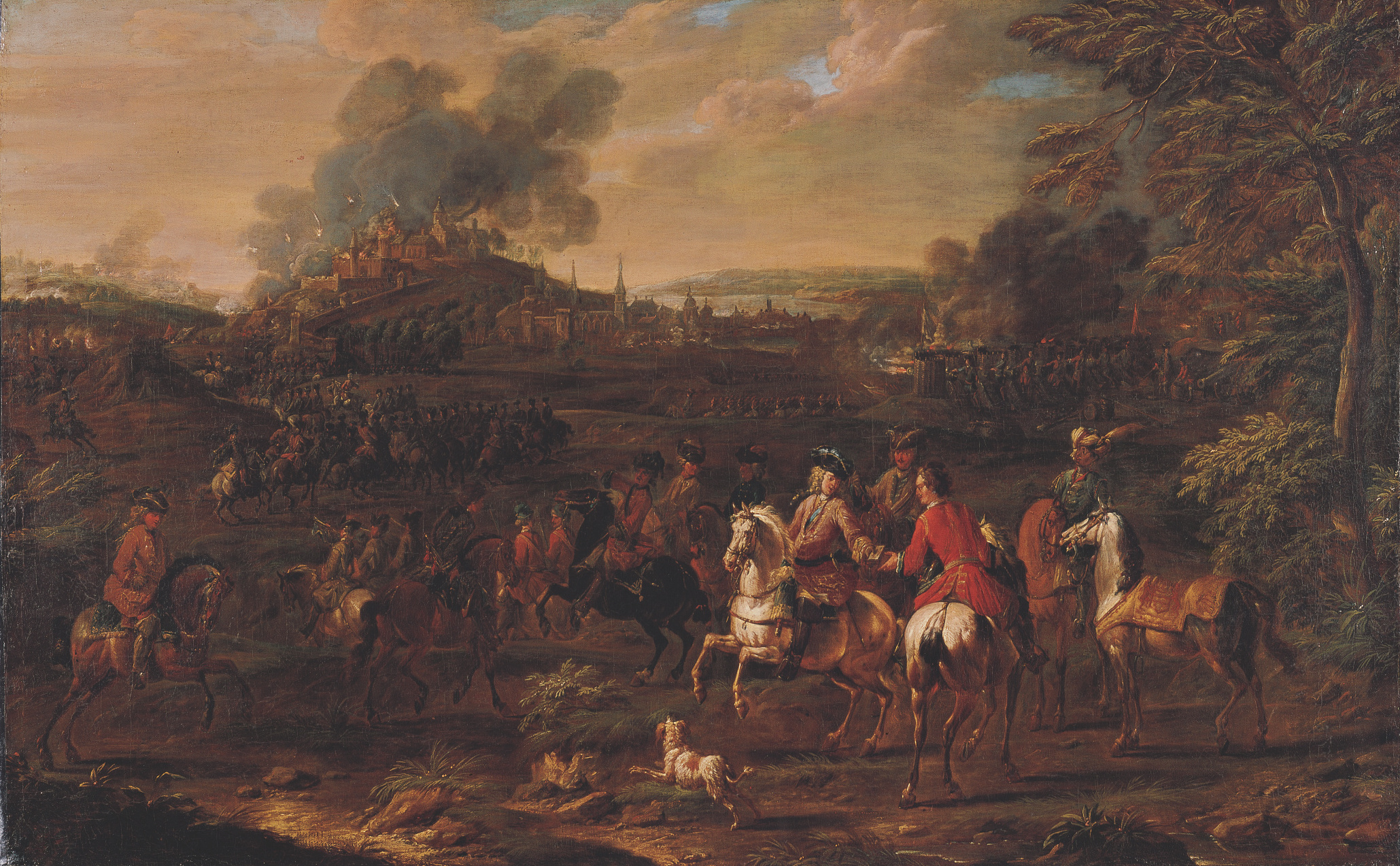
Siege of Visegrád by Jan Pieter van Bredael

The siege of Visegrád was fought between the forces of the Holy Roman Empire and the Ottoman Empire as part of the Great Turkish War. The Holy Roman Empire, led by Charles V, Duke of Lorraine captured the castle of Visegrád after a three-day siege.

== Prelude ==
The Hungarian campaign of 1684 began on 20 May when Charles V, Duke of Lorraine's Imperial force of 43,000 men under moved out from its base at the town of Šaľa on the river Váh, marching in disparate columns down the Danube's banks to undertake the conquest of Buda. The route along the southern bank contained the Ottoman castle of Visegrád.

== Siege ==
Lorraine started the siege of Visegrád on 15 June with an artillery bombardment. On 17 June, he demanded the Ottoman garrison's vacation of the fortress on penalty of execution by impalement. The garrison left the next day with its baggage.

== Aftermath ==
The last strongpoint on the road to Buda had been taken. The next action would be the Battle of Vác on 27 June.

== Bibliography ==
- Wheatcroft, Andrew (2008). The Enemy at the Gate: Habsburgs, Ottomans and the Battle for Europe. New York: Basic Books. ISBN 978-0-465-01374-6.
