= Charles V of Lorraine =

Duke of Lorraine and Bar from 1675 to 1690

Charles V
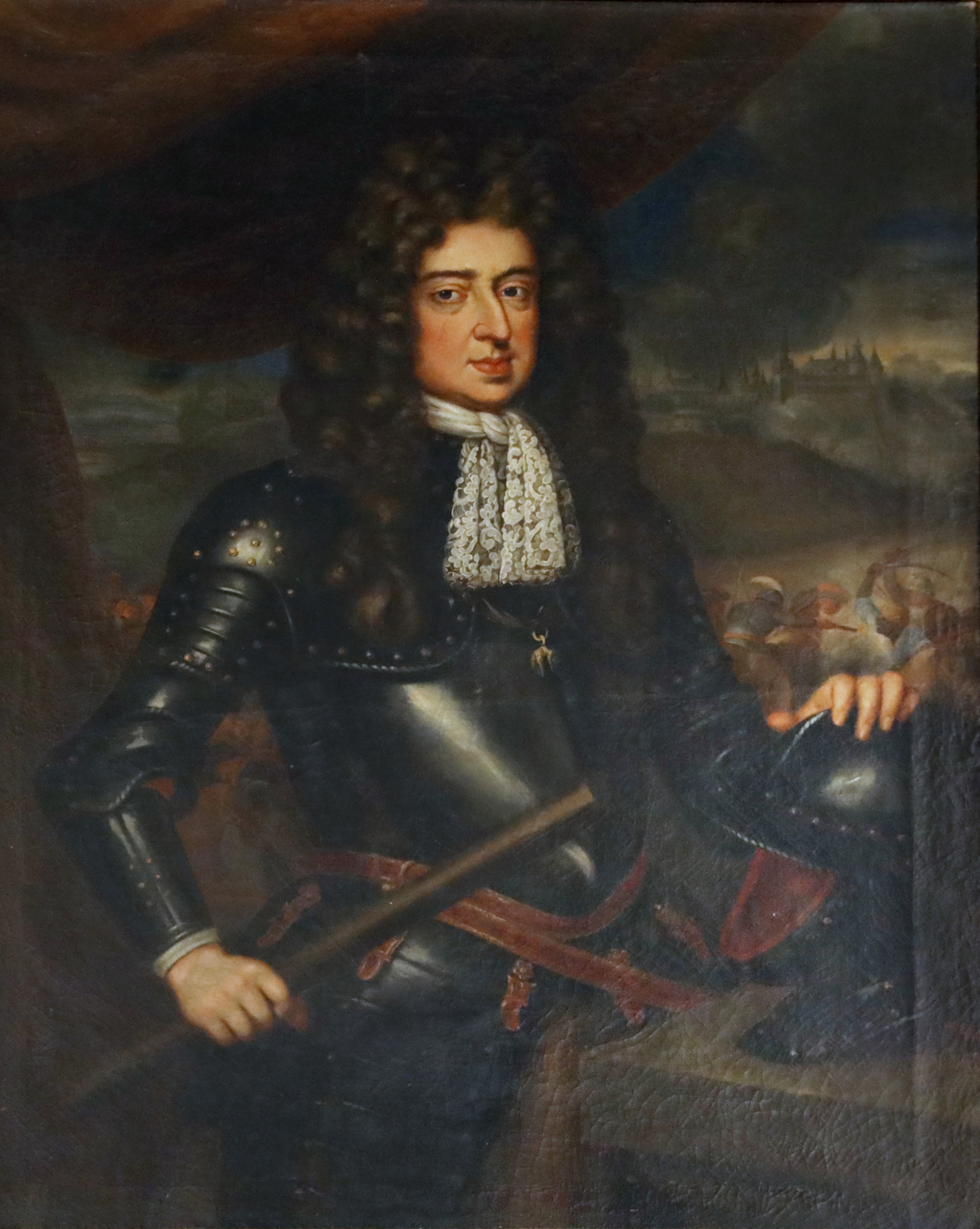
- 17th-century portrait

Duke of Lorraine and Bar
- Reign: 18 September 1675 – 18 April 1690
- Predecessor: Charles IV
- Successor: Leopold
- Born: 3 April 1643; Vienna, Archduchy of Austria
- Died: 18 April 1690 (aged 47); Wels, Archduchy of Austria
- Burial: Church of Saint-François-des-Cordeliers, Nancy, France
- Spouse: Eleonore of Austria (m. 1678)
- Issue more...: Leopold, Duke of Lorraine; Charles Joseph of Lorraine
- House: Lorraine
- Father: Nicholas Francis, Duke of Lorraine
- Mother: Claude-Françoise of Lorraine
- Religion: Catholicism
- Military career
- Allegiance: Duchy of Lorraine; Holy Roman Empire
- Branch: Imperial Army
- Service years: 1663–1690
- Rank: Generalfeldmarschall
- Conflicts: See battles: Austro-Turkish War (1663–1664); Battle of Saint Gotthard (1664); Franco-Dutch War; Battle of Seneffe; Siege of Philippsburg (1676); Battle of Ortenbach; Great Turkish War; Battle of Vienna; Siege of Visegrád; Battle of Vác (1684); Siege of Buda (1684); Siege of Esztergom (1685); Siege of Buda (1686); Battle of Mohács (1687); Nine Years War
- Awards: Order of the Golden Fleece

Charles V, Duke of Lorraine and Bar (French: Charles Léopold Nicolas Sixte; German: Karl V Leopold; 3 April 1643 – 18 April 1690) succeeded his uncle Charles IV, Duke of Lorraine as titular Duke of Lorraine and Bar in 1675; both duchies were occupied by France from 1634 to 1661 and 1670 to 1697.

Born in exile in Vienna, Charles spent his military career in the service of the Habsburg monarchy. He played an important role in the Great Turkish war of 1683, which reasserted Habsburg power in Hungary. Ending his life as an Imperial Field Marshal.

== Life ==
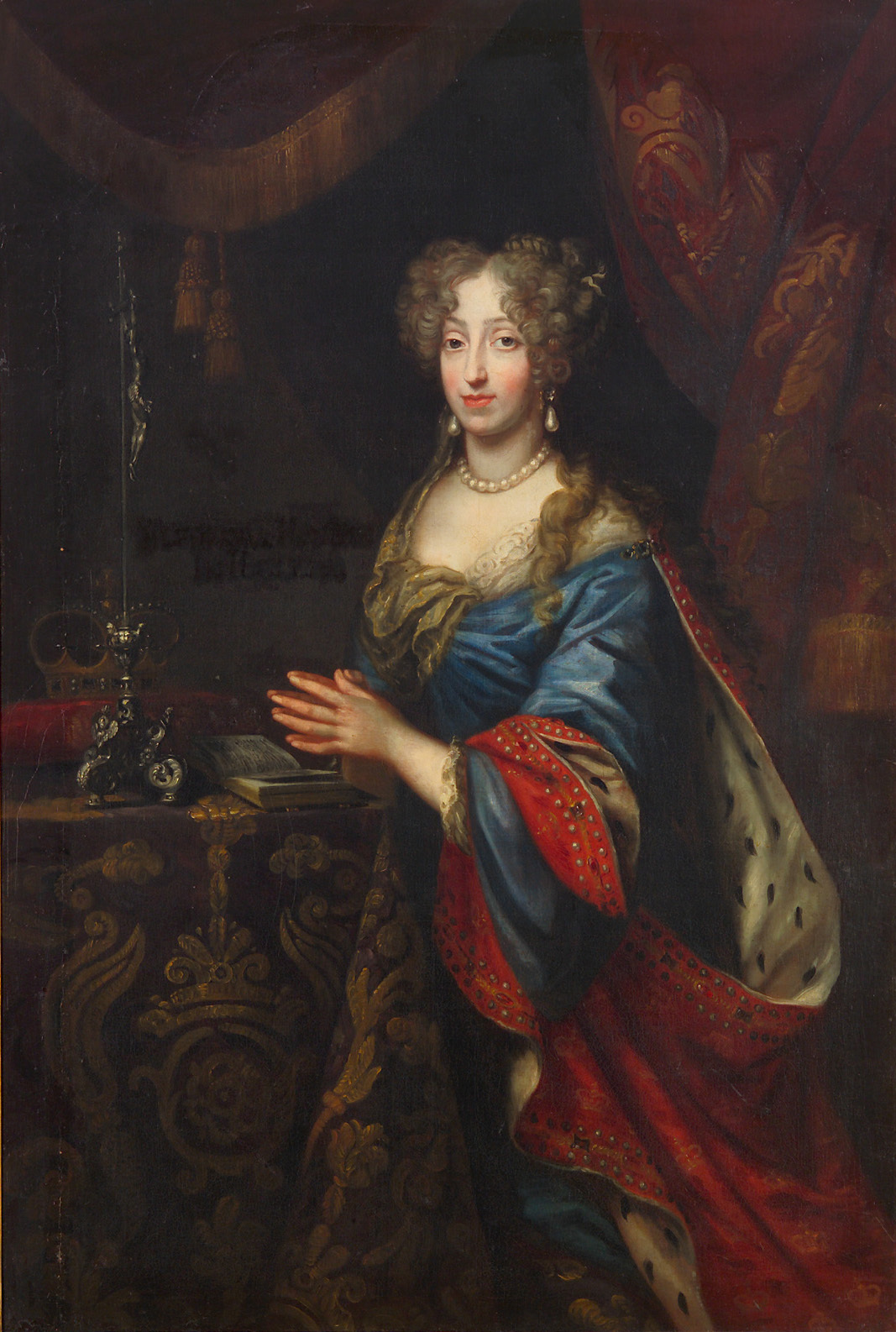
In 1678, Charles married Eleanor of Austria, formerly Queen of Poland

Charles was born on 3 April 1643 in Vienna, second son of Nicholas, younger brother of Charles IV, Duke of Lorraine, and his wife Claude Françoise of Lorraine. In 1634, his father replaced his uncle as duke; shortly afterwards, France occupied the Duchy of Lorraine and Nicholas went into exile, resigning in favour of his elder brother. The French withdrew in 1661, but invaded again in 1670 and only returned in 1697.

Charles became heir to the duchy on the death of his elder brother Ferdinand Philippe (1639–1659). In 1678, he married Eleanor of Austria (1653–1697), widow of King Michael of Poland; he stood for election twice as king of Poland but was unsuccessful.

They had four children who survived infancy;

- Leopold, Duke of Lorraine (1679–1729)
- Charles Joseph (1680–1715)
- Joseph Emanuel (20 October 1685 – 25 August 1705) died at 19 in battle. Unmarried and without issue.
- François Antoine (8 December 1689 – 25 July 1715) died aged 25, unmarried and without issue.

== Career ==
Charles, who always called himself Carolus, was destined for a career in the church as a younger son. In 1648 he became provost of Saint-Dié and in 1649 abbot of Gorze Abbey. However, the death of his older brother Ferdinand in 1659 made him heir to Lorraine and Bar. He resigned from his church offices and switched to a military career.

Charles was engaged to Marie Jeanne of Savoy but after his uncle was restored as Duke of Lorraine in 1661, he abandoned this marriage and returned to the Imperial court at Vienna. He took up a career in the Imperial Army in 1663, his first major action being Saint Gotthard in 1664, where he served under the Imperial commander, Raimondo Montecuccoli.

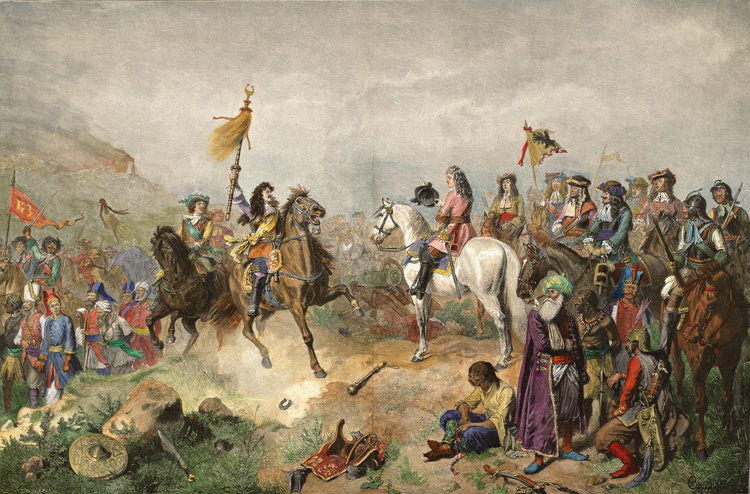
Ludwig Wilhelm of Baden (left) and Charles (right) at the Battle of Mohács

When France re-occupied Lorraine in 1670, both Charles and his uncle fought in the Imperial Army during the 1672–1678 Franco-Dutch War. He was wounded at the Battle of Seneffe in 1674 and replaced his uncle in the Rhineland after his death in 1675, taking part in the recapture of Philippsburg in 1676. In recognition of this, he was promoted Generalfeldmarschall in 1676 but was unable to build on these gains, largely due to poor logistics; in the last stages of the war, he was out manoeuvred by de Créquy and suffered minor defeats at Rheinfeld and Ortenbach.

The Treaty of Nijmegen in 1679 confirmed his title as Duke of Lorraine, but France retained the territory and, in 1681, also annexed Strasbourg, capital of Alsace. Charles' prospects of regaining his Duchy seemed increasingly remote and when the Great Turkish War began in 1683, he was appointed Commander of the Imperial army. He was outnumbered by the Ottomans, who were also supported by anti-Habsburg Hungarians known as Kurucs, as well as non-Catholic minorities who opposed Leopold's anti-Protestant policies.

Charles positioned his men outside Vienna, shielding them from the plague epidemic then prevailing in the city; unlike the Ottomans, many of whom died of it. His forces focused on raiding Ottoman camps and protecting resupply convoys to the city, while Pope Innocent XI assembled an alliance to support the Habsburgs. Known as the Holy League and led by John III Sobieski, this force combined with Charles's troops to defeat the besieging army at the Battle of Vienna on 11 September 1683.

In the next few years, the Habsburg army under Charles reconquered Hungary, Slavonia and Transylvania; his first siege of Buda in 1684 ended in defeat but was followed by major victories over the Ottomans at the siege of Buda in 1686 and the second battle of Mohács in 1687. In May 1688, he resigned his military commission in favor of Maximilian II Emanuel, Elector of Bavaria. When the War of the Palatine Succession broke out in September 1688, he returned to command Imperial forces in the Rhineland and reconquered Mainz from the French on 8 September 1689 but fell ill. He initially returned to his family in Innsbruck, but then wanted to travel to Vienna to organize a comprehensive army reform with Emperor Leopold. He died of a pulmonary embolism in Wels on 8 April 1690. He was succeeded by his son Leopold, who was restored as Duke of Lorraine after the 1697 Treaty of Ryswick. He was initially buried in the Jesuit Church in Innsbruck but after the treaty of Ryswick his remains were transferred to the ducal chapel in Church of Saint-François-des-Cordeliers in Nancy, Lorraine.

== Ancestry ==
Ancestors of Charles V of Lorraine

8. Charles III, Duke of Lorraine
4. Francis II, Duke of Lorraine
9. Claude of Valois
2. Nicholas Francis, Duke of Lorraine
10. Paul, Count of Salm-Badenweiler
5. Christina of Salm
11. Marie Le Veneur de Tillières
1. Charles V, Duke of Lorraine
12. Charles III, Duke of Lorraine (= 8)
6. Henry II, Duke of Lorraine
13. Claude of Valois (= 9)
3. Claude Françoise of Lorraine
14. Vincenzo Gonzaga, Duke of Mantua
7. Margherita Gonzaga
15. Eleonora de' Medici

== Sources ==
- De Périni, Hardÿ (1896). Batailles françaises, Volume V. Ernest Flammarion, Paris.
- Ingrao, Charles (2000). The Habsburg Monarchy 1618–1815. Cambridge University Press. ISBN 978-0521780346.
- Stoye, John (2007). The Siege of Vienna: The Last Great Trial Between Cross & Crescent. Pegasus Books. ISBN 978-1933648637.
- Tucker, Spencer (2010). Battles That Changed History: An Encyclopedia of World Conflict. ABC-CLIO. ISBN 978-1598844290.

Regnal titles
Preceded by Charles IV	Duke of Lorraine; 1675–1690	Succeeded by Leopold
