= Bildstein =

- Municipality
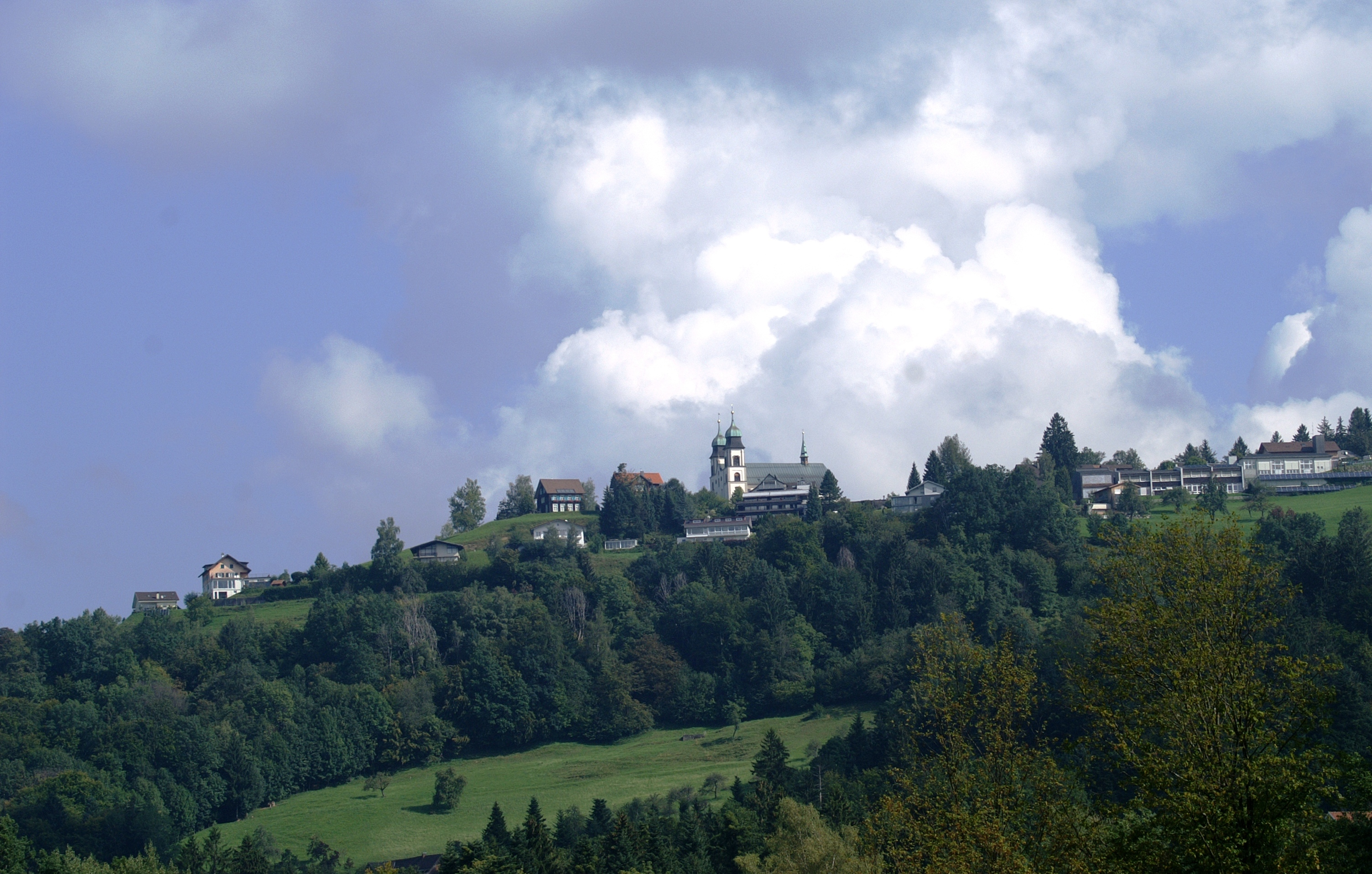

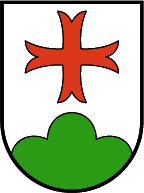
- Coat of arms

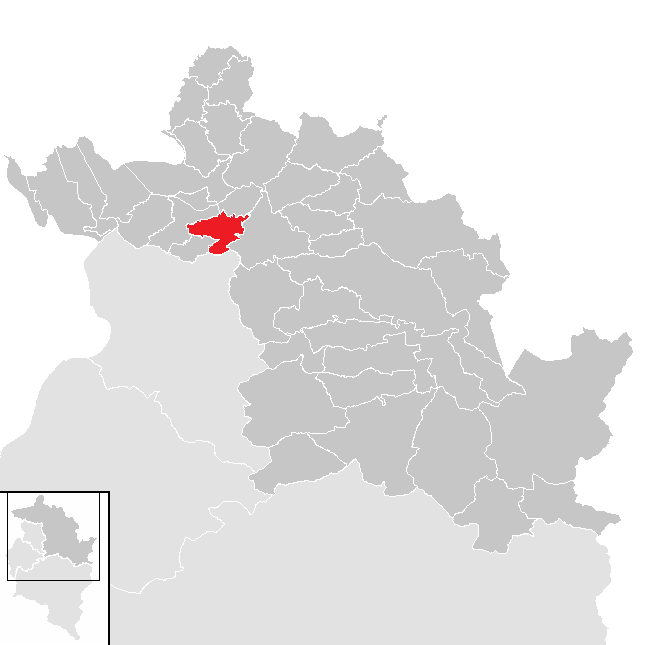
- Location in the district

- Location within Austria
- Coordinates: 47°27′N 09°46′E
- Country: Austria
- State: Vorarlberg
- District: Bregenz

Government
  - Mayor: Walter Moosbrugger

Area
  - Total: 9.15 km^{2} (3.53 sq mi)
- Elevation: 659 m (2,162 ft)

Population (2018-01-01)
  - Total: 766
  - Density: 83.7/km^{2} (217/sq mi)
- Time zone: UTC+1 (CET)
  - Summer (DST): UTC+2 (CEST)
- Postal code: 6858
- Website: http://www.gemeinde-bildstein.at

Bildstein is a municipality in the district of Bregenz in the Austrian state of Vorarlberg.

== Population ==
Historical population
Year	Pop.	±%
1869	807	—
1880	773	−4.2%
1890	721	−6.7%
1900	682	−5.4%
1910	672	−1.5%
1923	552	−17.9%
1934	573	+3.8%
1939	572	−0.2%
1951	586	+2.4%
1961	580	−1.0%
1971	587	+1.2%
1981	693	+18.1%
1991	704	+1.6%
2001	732	+4.0%
2011	725	−1.0%
