= Siege of Philippsburg (1676) =

1676 siege

- Part of the Franco-Dutch War
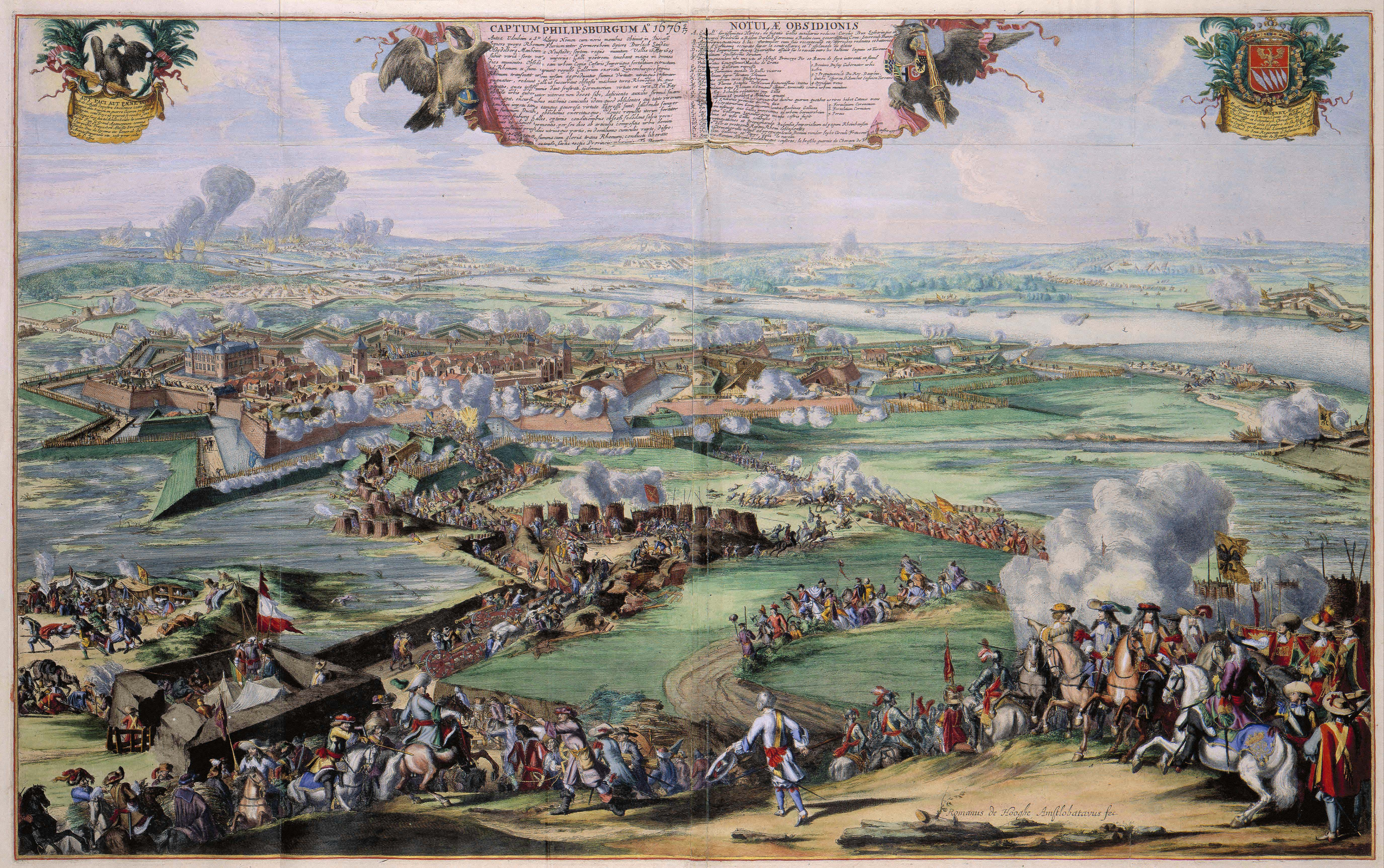
- The siege of Philippsburg
Date	23 June 1676 – 17 September 1676 (2 months, 3 weeks and 4 days)
Location	Philippsburg, Holy Roman Empire (present-day Germany) 49°14′13″N 8°27′17″E
Result	Imperial victory

Belligerents
Holy Roman Empire; Duchy of Lorraine	France

Commanders and leaders
Charles V of Lorraine; Frederick VI, Margrave of Baden-Durlach	(Kingdom of France) Charles de Faultrier du Fay

Strength
40,000	2,800

Casualties and losses
Unknown	1,300
- Location within Baden-Württemberg Siege of Philippsburg (1676) (Germany) Siege of Philippsburg (1676) (Europe)

The siege of Philippsburg was a successful Imperial siege of the fortress of Philippsburg during the Franco-Dutch War.

== History ==
In French hands since 1644 - with Breisach, it was then their only bridgehead on the east bank of the River Rhine and so Vauban had fortified it. This made it a constant threat to the Holy Roman Empire's west flank and at the outbreak of the Franco-Dutch War it became the jumping off point for several French incursions into the Palatinate and Neckar area. The garrisons of its outlying towns of Kißlau, Schwetzingen and Bruchsal were destroyed in spring 1676 and the Empire decided to lay siege to the fortress itself.

Charles V, Duke of Lorraine began the siege with a 40,000 strong imperial force on 23 June. The French commander Charles de Faultrier du Fay had just under 2,800 men and a French relief effort failed, leading to du Fay's surrender on 17 September. Only 1,500 French troops survived but these were allowed to march out with full military honours. 3,000 imperial troops were put in place to garrison the fortress, which remained in Imperial hands until its French recapture in 1688.
