= Ernst Rüdiger von Starhemberg =

Austrian field marshal (1638–1701)

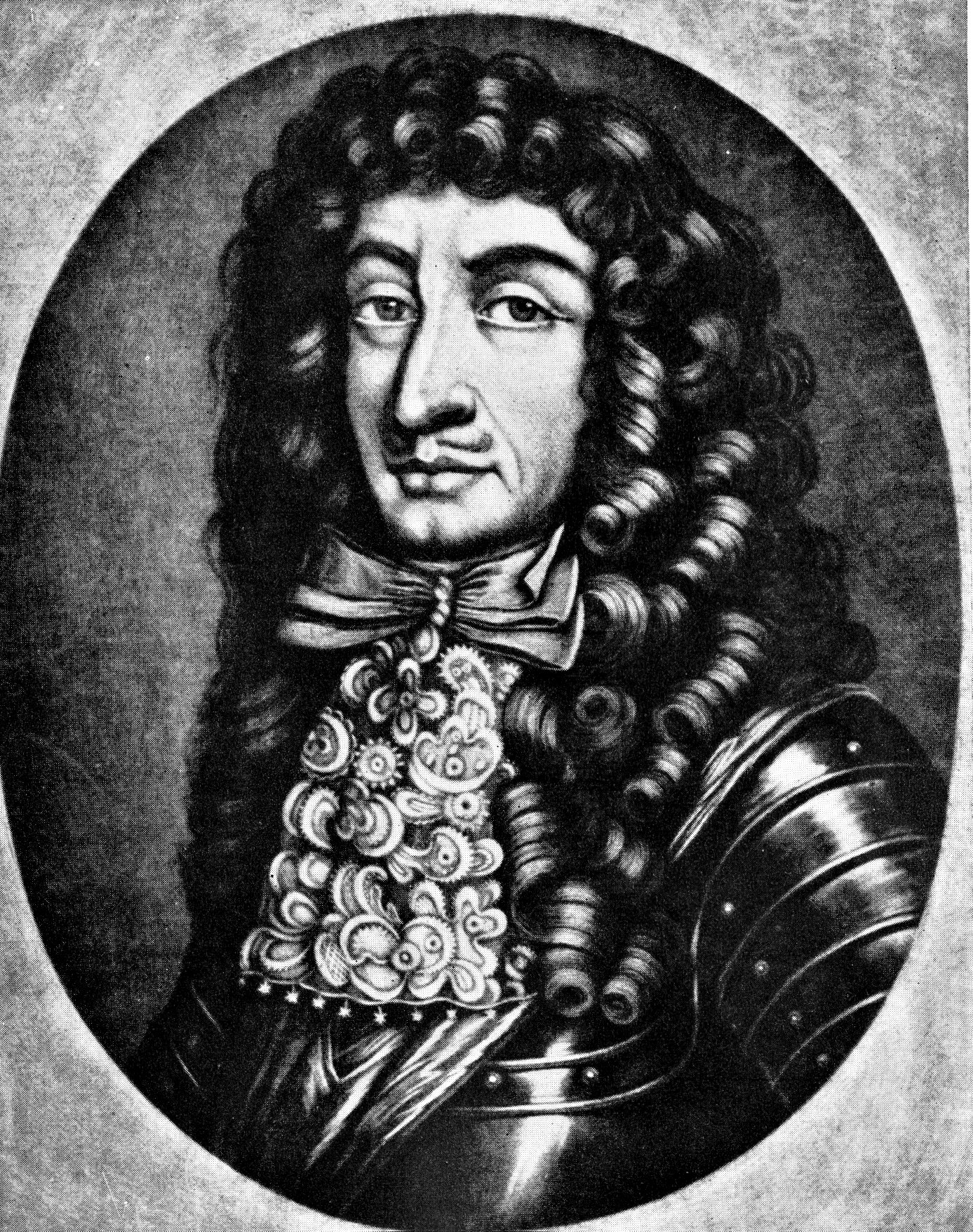
- Portrait, copy after Peter Schenk the Elder
- Born: 12 January 1638; Graz, Duchy of Styria
- Died: 4 January 1701 (aged 62); Vienna
- Burial place: Vienna
- Military career
- Allegiance: Holy Roman Empire
- Branch: Imperial Army
- Service years: c. 1660–1701
- Rank: Generalfeldmarschall
- Conflicts: Great Turkish War: Battle of Vienna; Battle of Buda; Battle of Ortenbach
- Awards: Order of the Golden Fleece

Count Ernst Rüdiger von Starhemberg (12 January 1638 – 4 January 1701) was military governor of Vienna from 1680, the city's defender during the Battle of Vienna in 1683, Imperial general during the Great Turkish War, and President of the Hofkriegsrat. By birth, he was a member of the House of Starhemberg.

== Life ==
He was born in Graz, Styria, as son of Count Conrad Balthasar von Starhemberg (1612–1687) and his first wife Countess Anna Elisabeth von Zinzendorf und Pottendorf (died in 1659). His cousin Count Guido von Starhemberg also became a famous soldier and fought as an adjutant at his side. Ernst Rüdiger von Starhemberg fought in the 1660s under Imperial Lieutenant general Raimondo Montecuccoli against French and Ottoman forces.

In 1683 he was military commander of the city of Vienna, with fewer than 20,000 men to oppose about 120,000 besieging Ottomans. On 15 July 1683 Starhemberg refused an offer by the Turkish commander Kara Mustafa Pasha to capitulate, counting on the speedy arrival of an Imperial army, sent by the Habsburg emperor Leopold I who had fled his residence, and the strength of city walls which had been fortified after the first Ottoman Siege of Vienna in 1529.

When after two months the relief army under the command of Polish king Jan Sobieski arrived in the first half of September, Vienna was on the brink of collapse. Its walls were breached by Turkish sappers who had tunnelled under the walls, packed the tunnels with gunpowder, and detonated the explosive charges. Finally, on 12 September, 80,000 Polish, Venetian, Bavarian, and Saxon troops attacked the Turks and were able to defeat them in the Battle on the Kahlenberg.

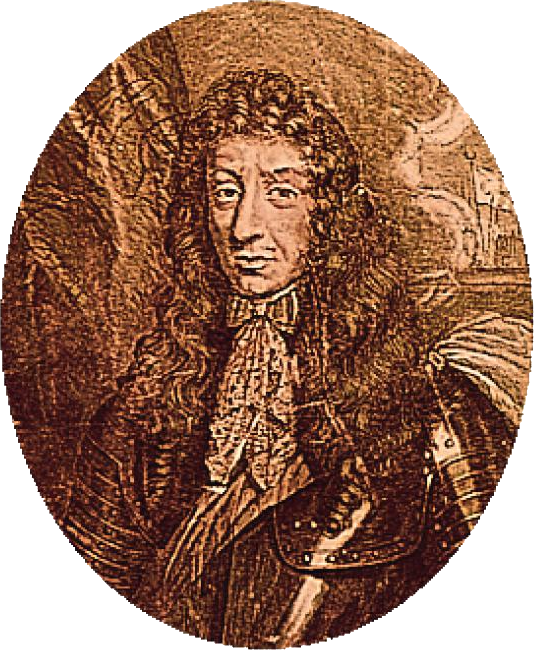
Starhemberg, engraving by Jean Le Pautre

Ernst Rüdiger von Starhemberg was promoted to the rank of a field marshal by the Emperor, recognizing Starhemberg's action in saving the imperial capital. He was also made a minister of the state. Going after the retiring Ottoman troops, Starhemberg was severely wounded in 1686 during the Siege of Buda by a shot in his left hand and had to abandon his command. In 1691 he was made President of the Hofkriegsrat and was responsible for the organisation of the Habsburg army.

== Personal life ==
He married firstly his third cousin, Countess Helena Dorothea von Starhemberg (1634–1688). After the death of his first wife, he married again in 1689 to Countess Maria Josepha Jörger von Tollet (1668–1746), his fourth cousin, once removed. He left issue from both marriages. The later Austrian politician Ernst Rüdiger, Fürst zu Starhemberg (1899–1956) was his descendant.

== Death ==
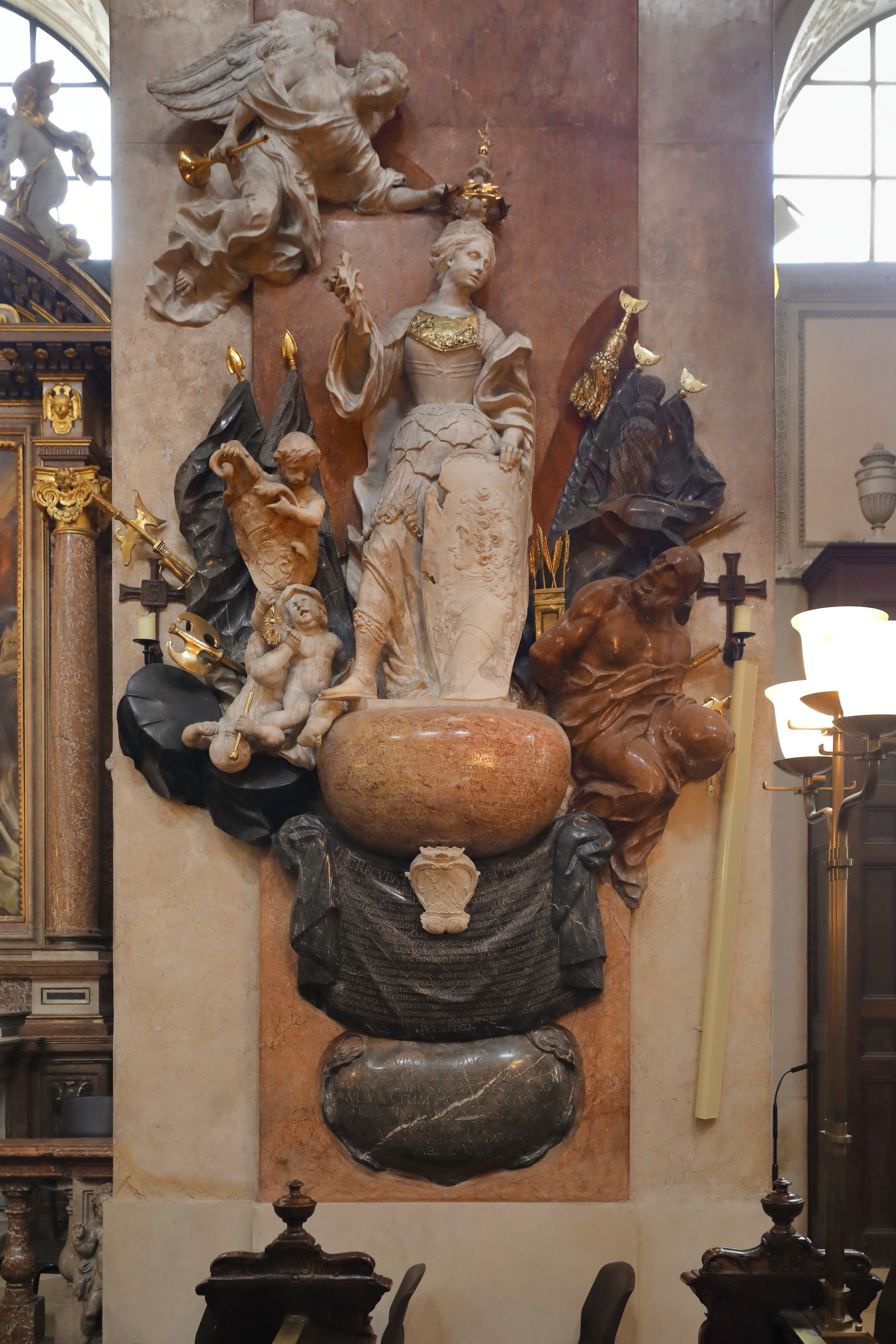
Epitaph of Count Starhemberg in Vienna's Schottenkirche

Starhemberg died in Vienna on 4 January 1701, aged 62. His tomb (by Joseph Emanuel Fischer von Erlach) is situated in the Vienna Schottenkirche.

== Legacy ==
Later generations have idealized Starhemberg as saviour of the Western world and culture. By order of Emperor Franz Joseph I of Austria, a statue was erected in his honour in 1872 at the Heeresgeschichtliches Museum in Vienna, where the Battle of Vienna is thoroughly documented, with Starhemberg's épée and armour on display.

== Sources ==
Adolf Schinzl: Starhemberg, Ernst Rüdiger Graf von. In: Allgemeine Deutsche Biographie (ADB). Band 35, Duncker & Humblot, Leipzig 1893, S. 468–470. Die Türkenkriege, Angriff auf das Abendland (= G/Geschichte; Heft Juni 2007)

== See also ==
- Starhemberg
