= Siege of Philippsburg (1688) =

1688 battle of the Nine Years' War

- Part of the Nine Years' War
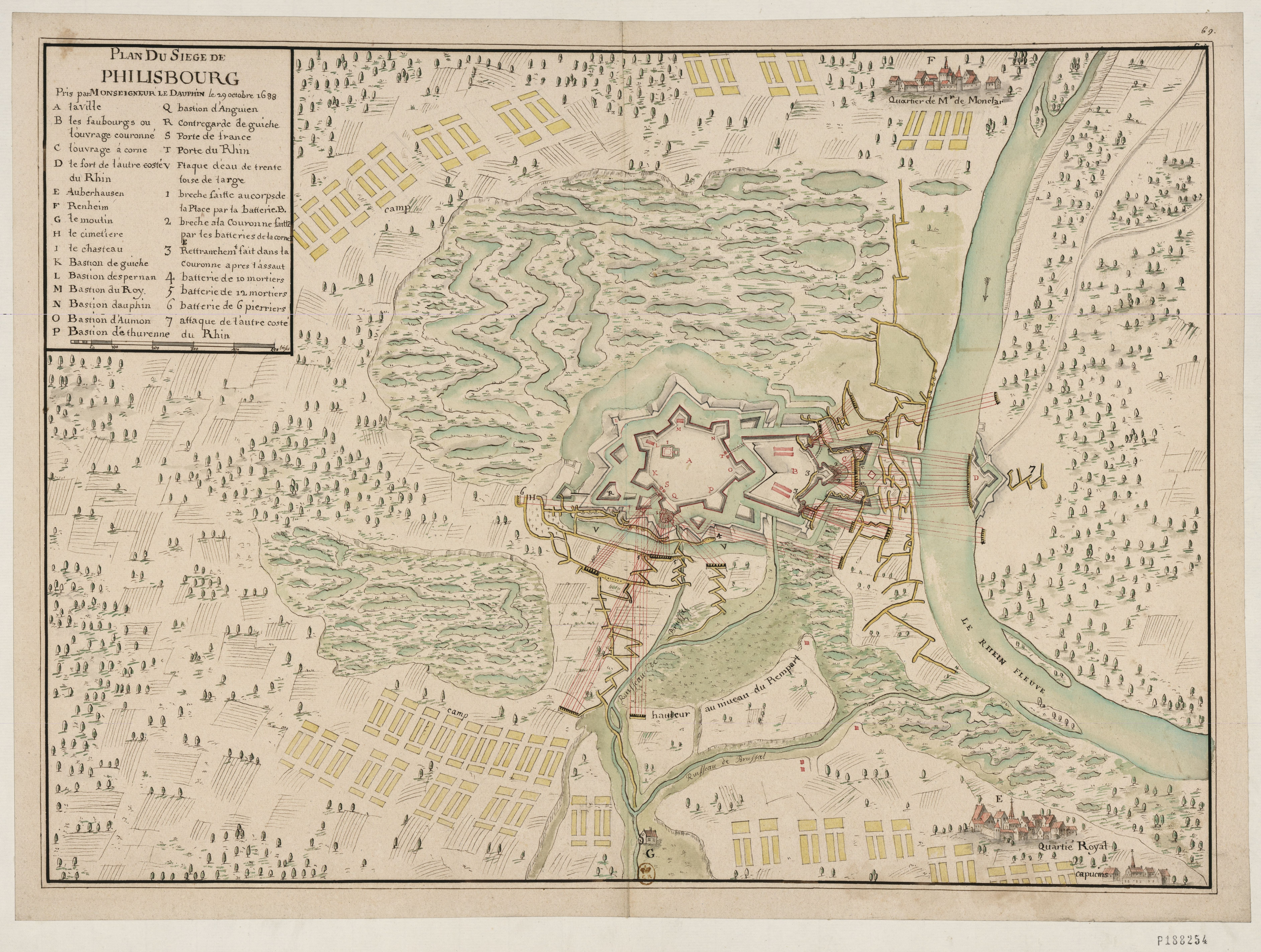
Date	27 September 1688 – 30 October 1688 (1 month and 3 days)
Location	Philippsburg, Holy Roman Empire (present-day Germany) 49.2370°N 8.4548°E
Result	French victory

Belligerents
France	Holy Roman Empire

Commanders and leaders
(Kingdom of France) Louis, Grand Dauphin; (Kingdom of France) Duc de Duras; (Kingdom of France) Marquis de Vauban	(Holy Roman Empire) Maximilian Lorenz Starhemberg

Strength
30,000–40,000 men 52 heavy guns 24 mortars	2,000 men 17 battery guns 90 small guns

Casualties and losses
587 dead 1,013 wounded	600 casualties 124 artillery pieces captured

The siege of Philippsburg was a siege of the fortress of Philippsburg during the War of the League of Augsburg. It occurred between 27 September and 30 October 1688 and ended in a French victory over the Imperial garrison.

== Bibliography ==
- Lavisse, Ernest (1989) [1908]. Louis XIV: histoire d'un grand règne, 1643–1715 (in French). Paris: Robert Laffont. p. 746. ISBN 222105502-0. OCLC 1088064621.
