= Battle of Vác (1684) =

Battle in the Great Turkish War

- Part of the Great Turkish War
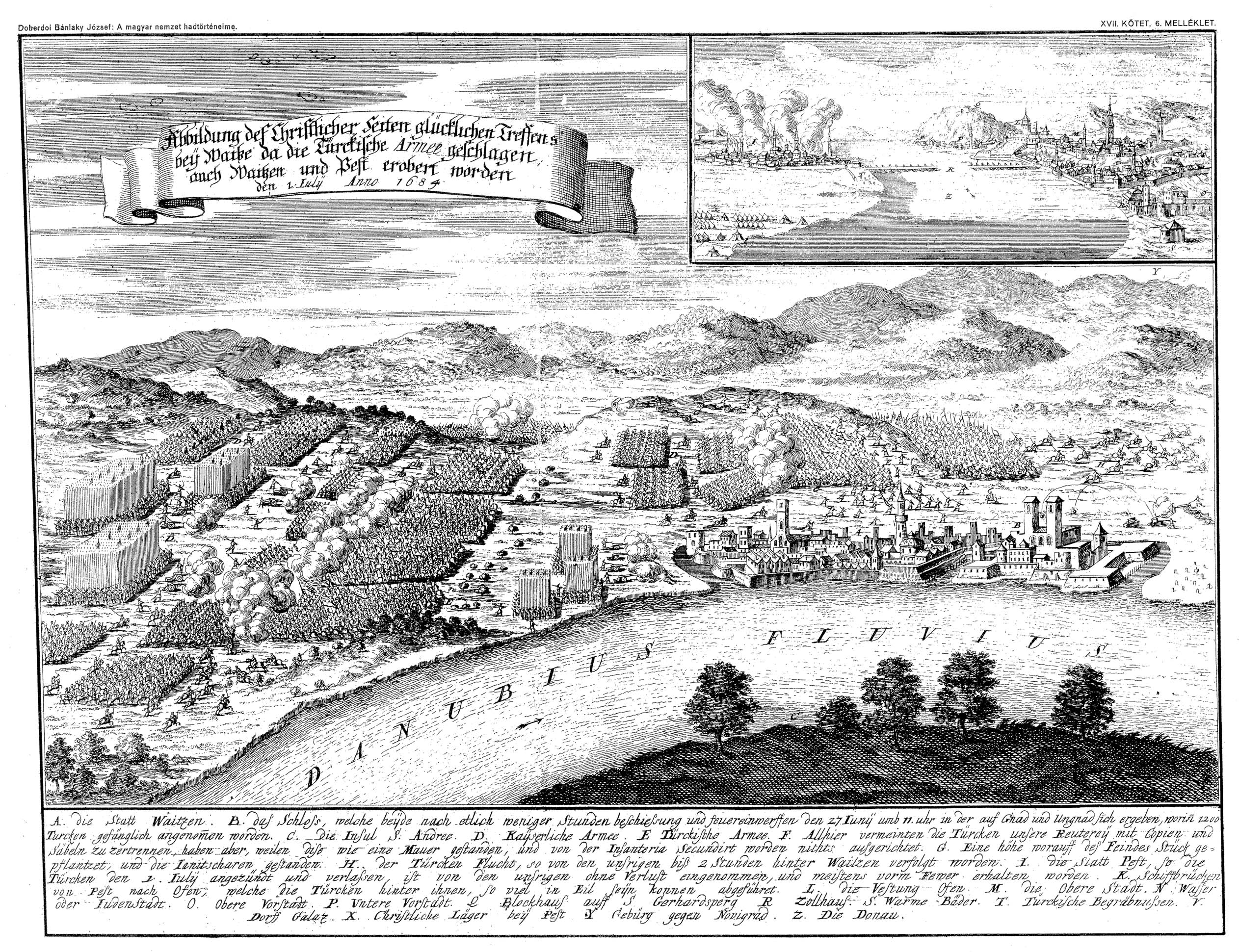
Date	27 June 1684
Location	Vác, Budin Eyalet, Ottoman Empire
Result	Holy Roman Empire victory

Belligerents
Holy Roman Empire	Ottoman Empire

Commanders and leaders
(Holy Roman Empire) Duke Charles of Lorraine	(Ottoman Empire) Kara Ibrahim Pasha

Strength
38,000–43,000	18,000

Casualties and losses
100	2,000

The Battle of Vác was fought on June 27, 1684, near the city of Vác in central Hungary, between the forces of the Ottoman Empire, and the forces of the Holy Roman Empire as part of the Great Turkish War. The Austrian army was victorious.

== Bibliography ==
- Bodart, G. (1908). Militär-historisches Kriegs-Lexikon (1618-1905).
- Wheatcroft, Andrew (2008). The Enemy at the Gate: Habsburgs, Ottomans and the Battle for Europe. New York: Basic Books. ISBN 978-0-465-01374-6.
