= Marie Anne d'Orléans =

Marie Anne
- Mademoiselle de Chartres
- Born: 9 November 1652; Palais d'Orléans, Paris, France
- Died: 17 August 1656 (aged 3); Palais d'Orléans, Paris, France
- Burial: Royal Basilica of Saint Denis
Names
- Marie Anne d'Orléans
- House: House of Orléans
- Father: Gaston d'Orléans
- Mother: Marguerite de Lorraine

Marie Anne d'Orléans, petite-fille de France (Marie Anne; 9 November 1652 - 17 August 1656) was a French Princess and youngest daughter of Gaston d'Orléans. She held the rank of Grand daughter of France. She was a member of the House of Orléans.

== Biography ==
Born at the Palais d'Orléans, the present day Luxembourg Palace in Paris, she was the youngest daughter born to the Duke and Duchess of Orléans.

Her father, Gaston d'Orléans, was the youngest brother of the late Louis XIII; as such, Marie Anne was born during the reign of her first cousin, the 12-year-old Louis XIV. As a grand daughter of France, Marie Anne was allowed the style of Royal Highness and was known as Mademoiselle de Chartres from birth.

Her older siblings included the future Grande Mademoiselle, the Grand Duchess of Tuscany, Duchess of Guise and the short lived Duchess of Savoy. Her only brother the Duke of Valois died in 1652 aged a year and a half.

She died at the Palais d'Orléans and was buried at the Royal Basilica of Saint Denis outside Paris, the traditional burial place of the House of Bourbon.

== Ancestors ==
Ancestors of Marie Anne d'Orléans

16. Charles, Duke of Vendôme
8. Antoine of Navarre
17. Françoise of Alençon
4. Henry IV of France
18. Henry II of Navarre
9. Jeanne III of Navarre
19. Marguerite of Angoulême
2. Gaston, Duke of Orléans
20. Cosimo I de' Medici, Grand Duke of Tuscany
10. Francesco I de' Medici, Grand Duke of Tuscany
21. Eleanor of Toledo
5. Marie de' Medici
22. Ferdinand I, Holy Roman Emperor
11. Joanna of Austria
23. Anne of Bohemia and Hungary
1. Marie Anne d'Orléans
24. Francis I, Duke of Lorraine
12. Charles III, Duke of Lorraine
25. Christina of Denmark
6. Francis II, Duke of Lorraine
26. Henry II of France
13. Claude of Valois
27. Catherine de' Medici
3. Marguerite of Lorraine
28. John VII, Count of Salm-Badenweiler
14. Paul, Count of Salm-Brandenburg
29. Louise de Stainville
7. Christina of Salm
30. Tanneguy Le Veneur, Comte de Tillières
15. Marie Le Veneur de Tillières
31. Madeleine Hélie de Pompadour

== References and notes ==
- Anselme de Sainte-Marie, Père (1726). Histoire généalogique et chronologique de la maison royale de France [Genealogical and chronological history of the royal house of France] (in French). Vol. 1 (3rd ed.). Paris: La compagnie des libraires.
