= Pinel =

Pinel is a surname. Notable people with the surname include:

- Raquel Pinel (born 1994), Spanish football forward currently playing for Valencia CF in the Spanish league.
- Germain Pinel (c. 1600–1661), French lutenist and composer.
- François Pinel (c. 1624-18 May 1709), French lutenist and theorbo player, younger brother of Germain Pinel.
- Marcel Pinel (1908–1968), French footballer.
- Suzanne Pinel, Canadian children's entertainer and citizenship judge.
- Julie Pinel (1710–1737), French composer and harpsichord teacher.
- Philippe Pinel (1745–1826), French physician.
