= Jean Gaston, Duke of Valois =

Jean Gaston
- Duke of Valois
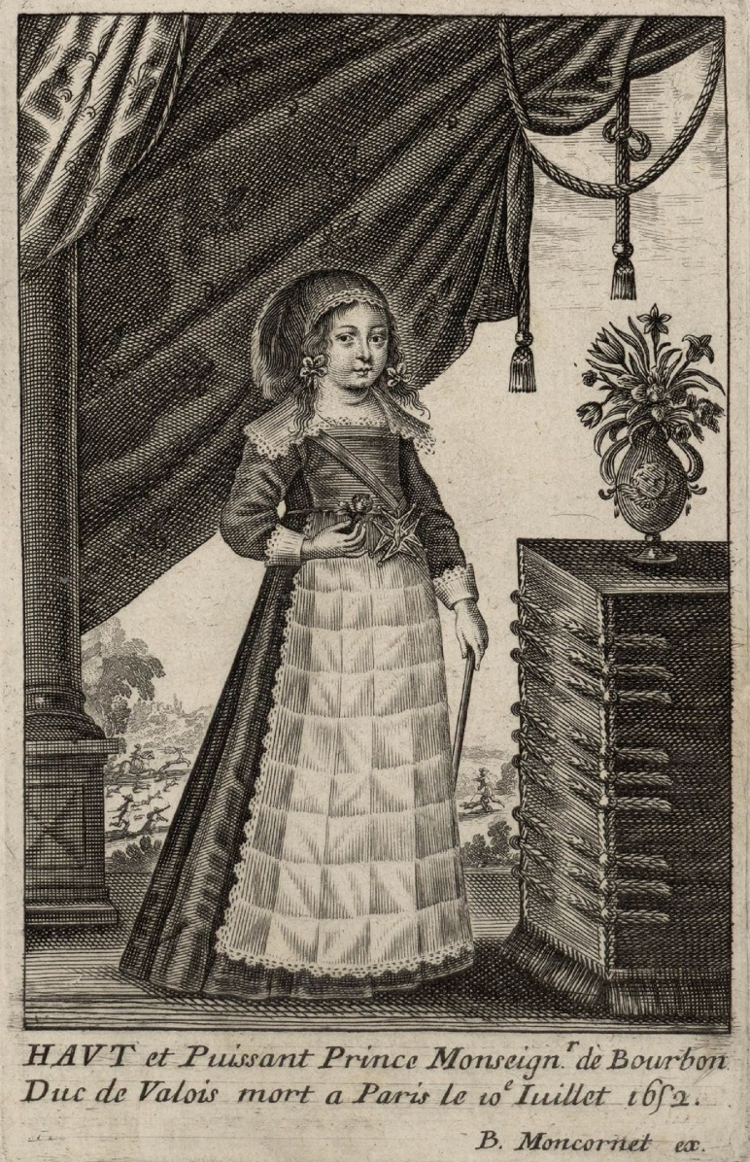
- An engraving of Jean Gaston
- Born: 17 August 1650; Palais d'Orléans, Paris, France
- Died: 10 August 1652 (aged 1); Palais d'Orléans, Paris, France
- Burial: 30 May 1656; Royal Basilica of Saint Denis
Names
- Jean Gaston d'Orléans
- House: House of Bourbon
- Father: Gaston d'Orléans
- Mother: Marguerite de Lorraine

Jean Gaston d'Orléans, petit-fils de France, Duke of Valois (17 August 1650 – 10 August 1652) was a French Prince and Grandson of France. He was a member of the House of Bourbon.

== Biography ==
Born at the Palais d'Orléans, the present day Luxembourg Palace in Paris, he was the first and only son born to the Duke and Duchess of Orléans. His father, Gaston d'Orléans, was the youngest brother of the late Louis XIII; as such, Jean Gaston was born during the reign of his first cousin, the 11-year-old Louis XIV.

He was given the title of Duke of Valois, a title which was from his father's appanage from Louis XIII.

As a Grandson of France, he was allowed the style of Royal Highness and from his birth, was the fourth male in the kingdom after Louis XIV, the Duke of Anjou and his father, Gaston. His birth was greatly celebrated by his older half-sister, Anne Marie Louise, "la Grande Mademoiselle" who ordered a large fireworks display in Paris to celebrate his birth. He was adored by la Grande Mademoiselle despite the child always having frail health; he was never able to walk and could not speak - Jean Gaston had a crooked leg which had been attributed to the Duchess of Orléans lying on her side throughout her pregnancy.

The little Duke of Valois died at the Palais d'Orléans of diarrhoea and was greatly mourned by his parents and half sister. He was buried at the Royal Basilica of Saint Denis outside Paris, the traditional burial place of the House of Bourbon. The duchy of Valois reverted to his father (died 1660), after whose death the duchy of Orléans reverted to the Crown. The previously mentioned Duke of Anjou became the Duke of Orléans and it is from him the present House of Orléans descends.

== Ancestors ==
Ancestors of Jean Gaston, Duke of Valois

8. Antoine of Navarre
4. Henry IV of France
9. Jeanne III of Navarre
2. Gaston, Duke of Orléans
10. Francesco I de' Medici, Grand Duke of Tuscany
5. Marie de' Medici
11. Joanna of Austria
1. Jean Gaston, Duke of Valois
12. Charles III, Duke of Lorraine
6. Francis II, Duke of Lorraine
13. Claude of Valois
3. Marguerite of Lorraine
14. Paul, Count of Salm-Brandenburg
7. Christina of Salm
15. Marie Le Veneur de Tillières

== References and notes ==
- Anselme de Sainte-Marie, Père (1726). Histoire généalogique et chronologique de la maison royale de France [Genealogical and chronological history of the royal house of France] (in French). Vol. 1 (3rd ed.). Paris: La compagnie des libraires.
