= Mademoiselle de Valois =

Mademoiselle de Valois may refer to one of the following:

- Françoise Madeleine d'Orléans (1648–1664) daughter of Gaston, Duke of Orléans and Marguerite of Lorraine.
- Anne Marie d'Orléans (1669–1728) daughter of Philippe I, Duke of Orléans and Princess Henrietta of England.
- Marie Isabelle d’Orléans (1693–1694) eldest daughter of Philippe II, Duke of Orléans and Françoise Marie de Bourbon. She died 10 months old.
- Charlotte Aglaé d'Orléans (1700–1761) daughter of Philippe II, Duke of Orléans and Françoise Marie de Bourbon.
- Princess Marie of Orléans (1813–1839), daughter of Louis Philippe I and Maria Amalia of Naples and Sicily.
