= Germain Pinel =

French lutenist (17th century)

Germain Pinel (Paris, c.1600 – October 1661) was a French lutenist and composer.

== Biography ==
His father Pierre Pinel was himself a lutenist, like several other members of the family (especially his younger brother François Pinel) and his three sons Jean-Baptiste, Jean and Séraphin.

Germain was quoted as master of lute in 1630. He entered the service of Marguerite of Lorraine Duchess of Orléans in 1645. From 1647, he was called to teach the lute to the young Louis XIV, aged 9.

He was one of the musicians of the King's Chamber for the lute and theorbo from 1656 on. With wages of up to 2000 livres tournois, he was one of the leading musicians. His succession shows that he had a very comfortable lifestyle.

In 1658, his post passed to his son Séraphin, who, despite his promising debut, no longer appeared as a lutenist after his father's death in 1661.

== Germain Pinel's music ==
Over 80 pieces for the lute and two pieces for theorbo - one an unmeasured prelude - attributed to Pinel have reached us. One-third of these works come from the manuscript Ms. Schwerin 641, written c. 1651. It was written with two hands, one of which could be that of Pinel himself. The two theorbo pieces can be found in the Goess MS Theorbo.

Most of his compositions are dances: allemandes, courantes, sarabandes and gigues.

He is quoted by the master of Mary Burwell, who said of him, after his death, that "his play was gay and melodious, he composed his plays with great ease." Ennemond "Old" Gaultier himself cited him as one of the masters of his time.

In 2014 the Franco-Portuguese luthist Miguel Serdoura devoted a record to him for the Dutch label Brilliant Classics, entitled "les-rois-de-versailles". Rob MacKillop has recorded the two theorbo pieces on a théorbe de pièces: Prelude and Courante.

== Sources ==
- Rollin, Monique; Vaccaro, Jean-Michel (1982). "XXIII". Œuvres de Pinel. Corpus des luthistes français (in French). Paris: CNRS. p. 201. ISBN 2-222-03147-8.
