= Julie Pinel =

Composer and harpsichordist

Julie Pinel (fl. 1710–1737) was a French composer and harpsichord teacher, born into the Pinel family of court musicians. Very little is known of her life, but she dedicated her published collection of songs to the "Prince of Soubize", thought to be Charles de Rohan, the patron of her family.

== Works ==
Pinel published her collection of 31 songs, Nouveau receuil d'airs sérioux et à boire in 1737. Other selected works include:

- Le Printems, cantatille
- Rossignols
- Boccages
- Echos indiscrets
- Bergères
- Pourquoy
- Appollonius, opera

Her music has been recorded and issued on CD, including:

- The Pleasures of Love and Libation Orchestra: La Donna Musicale, Conductor: Laury Gutierrez, Audio CD (May 1, 2007), Label: La, ASIN: B003050FXY
- Vouz avez dit Brunettes? Les Kapsber'girls. Label: Alpha, EAN: 3760014197611
