= Marguerite of Lorraine =

- Duchess of Orléans
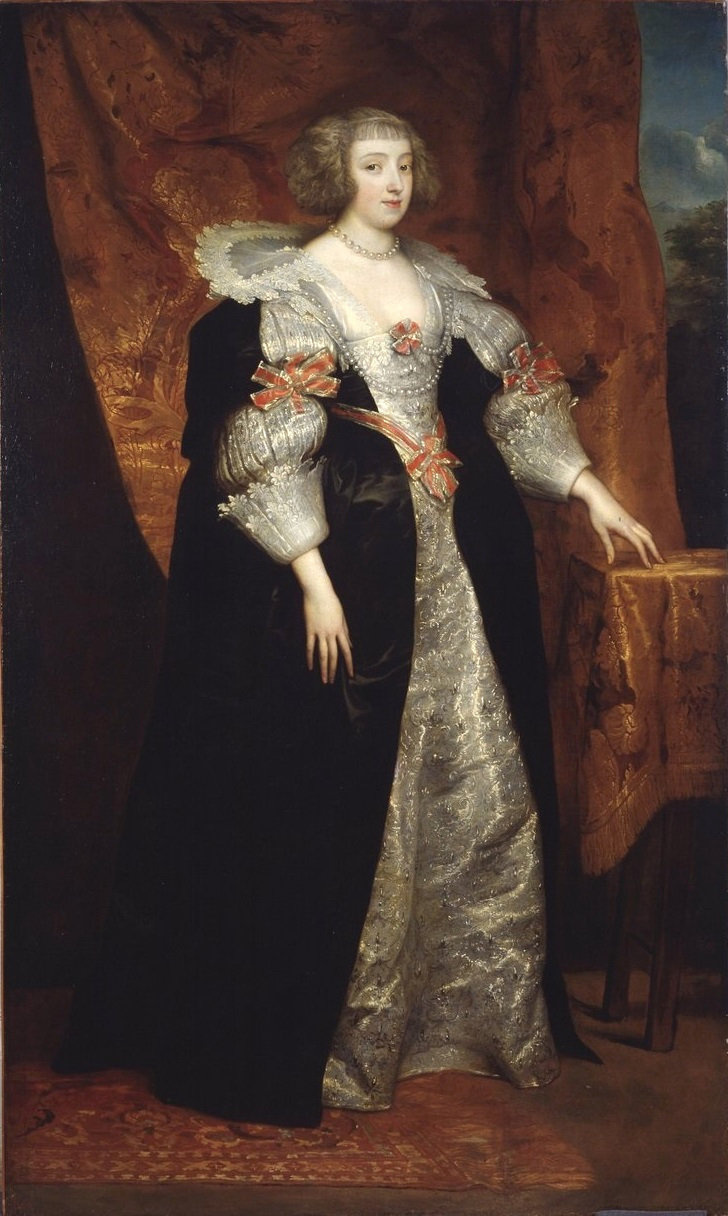
- Portrait, c. 1630
- Born: 22 July 1615; Ducal Palace of Nancy, Lorraine
- Died: 13 April 1672 (aged 56); Palais d'Orléans, Paris, France
- Burial: Basilica of Saint-Denis
- Spouse: Gaston, Duke of Orléans
- Issue: Marguerite Louise, Grand Duchess of Tuscany; Isabelle, Duchess of Guise; Françoise Madeleine, Duchess of Savoy; Jean Gaston, Duke of Valois; Marie Anne, Mademoiselle de Chartres
- House: Lorraine
- Father: Francis II, Duke of Lorraine
- Mother: Countess Christina of Salm
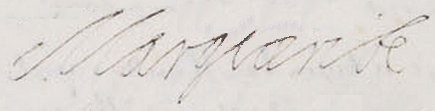
- Signature

Marguerite of Lorraine (22 July 1615 – 13 April 1672), Duchess of Orléans, was the wife of Gaston, younger brother of Louis XIII. As Gaston had married her in secret in defiance of the King, Louis had their marriage nullified when it became known. On his deathbed, Louis permitted them to marry. After their remarriage, Marguerite and Gaston had five children. She was the stepmother of La Grande Mademoiselle.

== Life ==
Marguerite was born in Nancy, Lorraine, to Francis II, Duke of Lorraine, and Countess Christina of Salm. One of six children, she grew up in Nancy which was the capital of her father's duchy. After her mother's death in 1627, she was brought up by her aunt Catherine of Lorraine—the Abbess of Remiremont. Two of her older brothers, Charles and Nicolas, were successively dukes of Lorraine.

=== Duchess of Orléans ===
While taking refuge from the wrath of the French prime minister, Cardinal Richelieu, Gaston, Duke of Orléans, younger brother and heir presumptive of Louis XIII, fell in love with Marguerite. As France and Lorraine were enemies, however, Gaston was refused permission to marry the sister of Lorraine's duke, Charles IV of Lorraine. Nonetheless, Gaston returned to Lorraine and, in a secret ceremony in the presence of her family at Nancy during the night of 2–3 January 1632, took Marguerite as his wife. Since he had not obtained the prior permission of his elder brother—one of his many acts of defiance—the couple could not appear at the French court and the marriage was kept secret.

In November that same year, Henri II, Duke of Montmorency, on his way to the scaffold, betrayed Gaston by revealing the elopement to the king and Richelieu. The king had his brother's marriage declared void by the Parlement of Paris in September 1634 and, despite the Pope's protest, the Assembly of the French clergy affirmed the nullification in September 1635 on the grounds that a prince du sang, especially an heir to the throne, could only enter into matrimony with the permission of the king—consistent with French sovereignty and custom. Although Marguerite and Gaston had renewed their marriage before the Archbishop of Malines, a French emissary persuaded the Pope not to publicly protest the matter, and Gaston was forced to accept the annulment of his marriage. When Louis XIII was on his death bed in May 1643, he accepted his brother's plea for forgiveness, authorizing his marriage to Marguerite, whereupon the couple took their vows for the third time in July 1643 before the Archbishop of Paris at Meudon. The Duke and Duchess of Orléans were finally received at court and could begin producing lawful progeny.

By right of her marriage, Marguerite became known as Madame at court. After the death of his mother in 1642, Gaston was bequeathed the Luxembourg Palace, which became the couple's Parisian residence under the name Palais d'Orléans once they were restored to royal favor. They also sojourned at the Château de Blois, in the Loire Valley, where their first child was born in 1645. Marguerite, however, did not play any significant role at the French court. Although she received a warm welcome after the death of Louis XIII, she suffered from agoraphobia and seldom visited the court where her duties were undertaken by her step-daughter, Mademoiselle, with whom she did not get along.

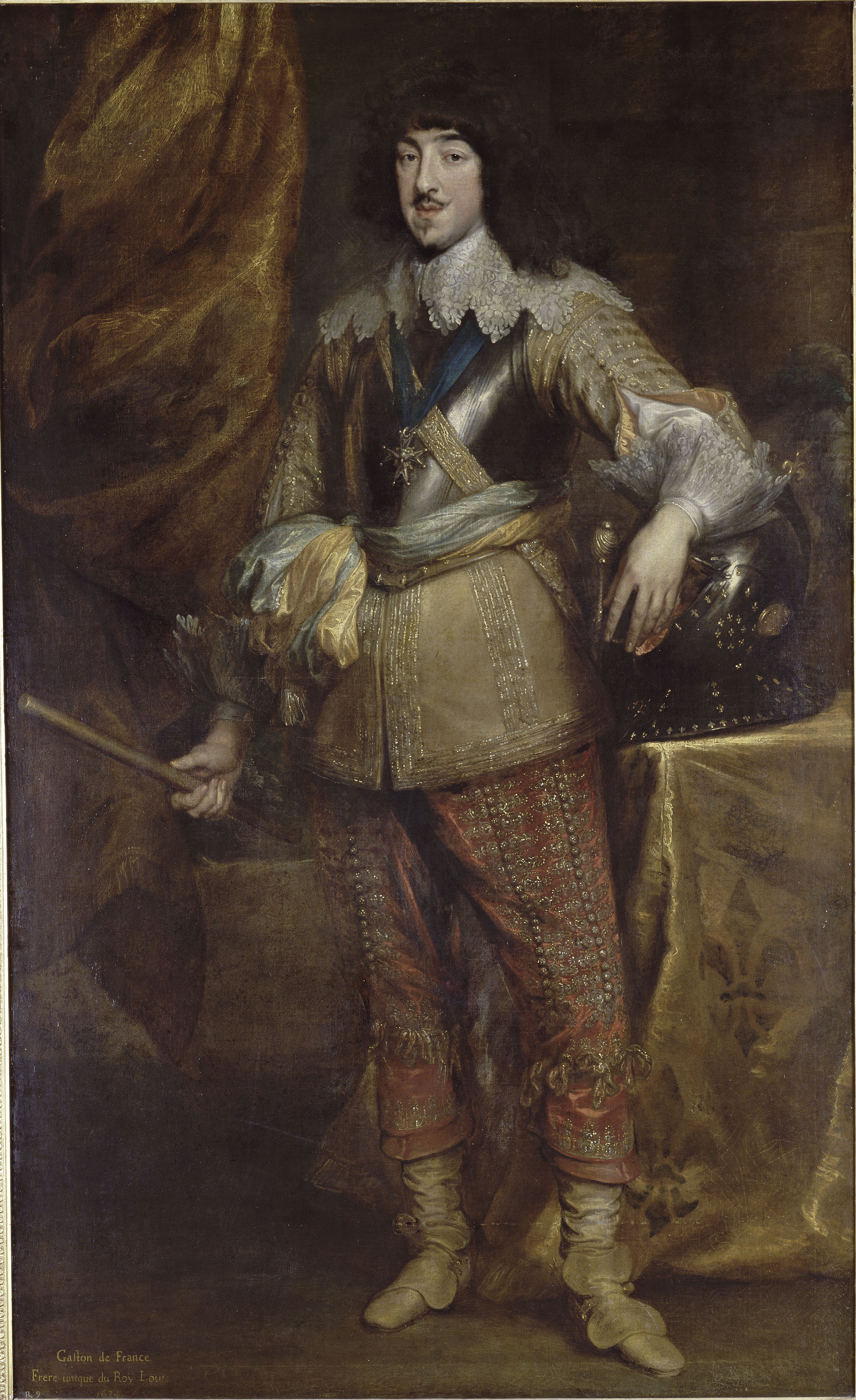
Portrait of Gaston, Duke of Orléans, 1634

=== Widowhood ===
Marguerite's husband, who had played a major part in the Fronde against his nephew the young king Louis XIV (as had her stepdaughter Anne Marie Louise d'Orléans, La Grande Mademoiselle), was exiled to his castle at Blois where he died in 1660. Some time after her husband's death, Louis XIV gave the dukedom of Orléans to his brother (and Gaston's nephew), Philippe of France, Duke of Orléans, who became the new Monsieur. As "Dowager Duchess of Orléans," Marguerite continued to reside in the Palais d'Orléans, where she died on 13 April 1672. She was buried at the Basilica of Saint Denis.

== Issue ==
1. Marguerite Louise d'Orléans (28 July 1645 – 17 September 1721) married Cosimo III de' Medici, Grand Duke of Tuscany and had issue.
2. Élisabeth Marguerite d'Orléans (26 December 1646 – 17 March 1696) married Louis Joseph de Lorraine, Duke of Guise and had issue.
3. Françoise Madeleine d'Orléans (13 October 1648 – 14 January 1664) married Charles Emmanuel II, Duke of Savoy with no issue.
4. Jean Gaston d'Orléans, Duke of Valois (17 August 1650 – Paris, 10 August 1652) died in infancy.
5. Marie Anne d'Orléans (9 November 1652 – Blois, 17 August 1656) died in infancy.

== Ancestry ==
Ancestors of Marguerite of Lorraine

8. Francis I, Duke of Lorraine
4. Charles III, Duke of Lorraine
9. Christina of Denmark
2. Francis II, Duke of Lorraine
10. Henry II of France
5. Claude of Valois
11. Catherine de' Medici
1. Marguerite of Lorraine
12. John VII, Count of Salm-Badenweiler
6. Paul of Salm
13. Claude de Stainville
3. Christina of Salm
14. Tanneguy I Le Veneur
7. Marie Le Veneur
15. Madeleine Hélie de Pompadour
