= François Pinel =

François Pinel (Paris, c. 1624 - 18 May 1709) was a French lutenist and theorbo player.

His brother Germain Pinel, at least twenty years his elder, was himself a lutenist, like several other members of the family (including Germain's three sons: Jean-Baptiste, Jean and Séraphin).

His name was mentioned in January 1656, when he participated with his brother Germain and his nephew Séraphin in a "ballet de Psyché" in front of Louis XIV, and composed by Jean-Baptiste Lully and Jean-Baptiste Boësset. They were part of a group of seven musicians whose game, that evening, "charmed the hearing" of the audience.

He devoted himself to the theorbo but also to singing, and participated in the concerts of His Majesty's Chamber. In 1665, Lully was the godfather of his daughter Françoise. In October 1667, Louis XIV authorized him to buy back a charge of "ordinary music of the Chamber for theorbo".

He enjoyed a notoriety, playing at court and teaching in the city. He was quoted among the master theorbists of his time: Charles Hurel, Robert de Visée, Le Moine, etc.

== Sources ==
- Rollin, Monique; Vaccaro, Jean-Michel (1982). Œuvres de Pinel. Corpus des luthistes français (in French). Vol. XXIII. Paris: CNRS. p. 201. ISBN 2-222-03147-8.
