= Portrait of Gaston, Duke of Orléans =

Painting by Anthony van Dyck

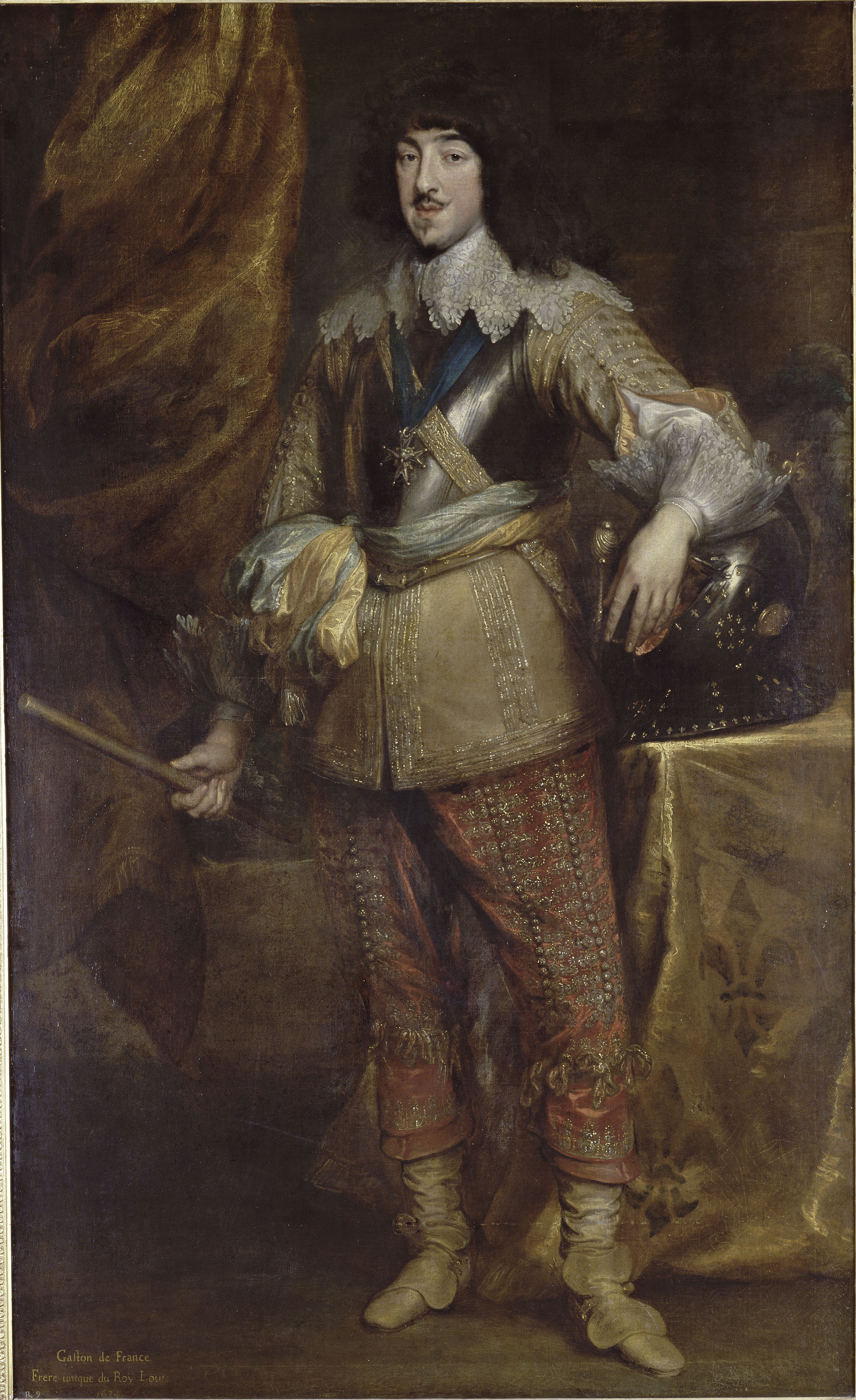

Portrait of Gaston, Duke of Orléans is an oil on canvas portrait of Gaston, Duke of Orléans by Anthony van Dyck, painted in 1632 or 1634. At the time its subject had fled France and was living in exile in his mother Marie de Medici's court in Brussels. Already official painter to Charles I of England (husband of Gaston's sister Henrietta Maria), Van Dyck passed through the city in March 1632 - a document shows that in August 1632 Charles I paid van Dyck for a full-length painting of "his brother-in-law, Monsieur, the brother of the king of France". However, the painting has alternatively been dated to 1634, the date given in a later inscription added to the painting - that year van Dyck was again in the Spanish Netherlands.

The painting was sold to Colonel John Hutchinson in 1649 and is mentioned in an 1816 London sale by Christie's, at which it was bought by the Prince Regent. After the Regent had come to the throne in his own right as George IV, he gave it as a gift to the duke of Orléans in 1829. The Duke's youngest son Henri inherited it from Marie-Amelie of the Two Sicilies in 1866. He initially kept it at Twickenham during his British exile, before moving it to the salle de la Tribune in his château de Chantilly, where it still hangs as part of the Musée Condé.

== See also ==
- List of paintings by Anthony van Dyck
