= Gaston, Duke of Orléans =

French prince (1608–1660)

Gaston
- Duke of Orléans
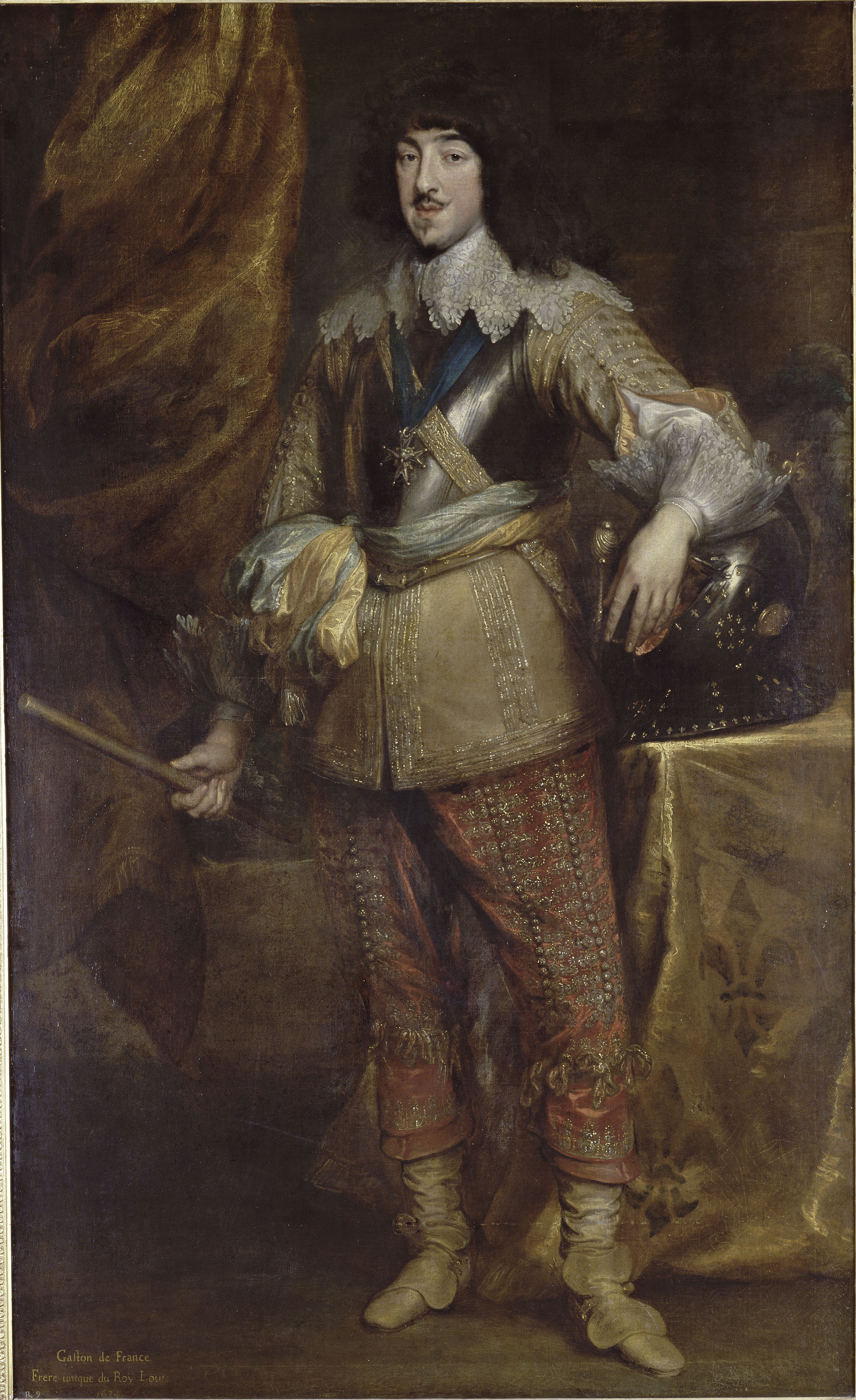
- Portrait of Gaston, Duke of Orléans, 1634
- Born: 24 April 1608; Palace of Fontainebleau, France
- Died: 2 February 1660 (aged 51); Château de Blois, France
- Burial: Royal Basilica, Saint Denis
- Spouse: Marie de Bourbon, Duchess of Montpensier (m. 1626; died 1627) Marguerite of Lorraine (m. 1632; ann. 1635) (m. 1643)
- Issue Detail: Anne Marie, Duchess of Montpensier; Marguerite Louise, Grand Duchess of Tuscany; Isabelle, Duchess of Guise; Françoise Madeleine, Duchess of Savoy; Jean Gaston, Duke of Valois; Marie Anne, Mademoiselle de Chartres
Names
- Gaston Jean Baptiste
- House: Bourbon
- Father: Henry IV of France
- Mother: Marie de' Medici

Monsieur Gaston, Duke of Orléans (Gaston Jean Baptiste; 24 April 1608 – 2 February 1660), was the third son of King Henry IV of France and his second wife, Marie de' Medici. As a son of the king, he was born a Fils de France. He later acquired the title Duke of Orléans, by which he was generally known during his adulthood. As the eldest surviving brother of King Louis XIII, he was known at court by the traditional honorific Monsieur.

== Early life ==
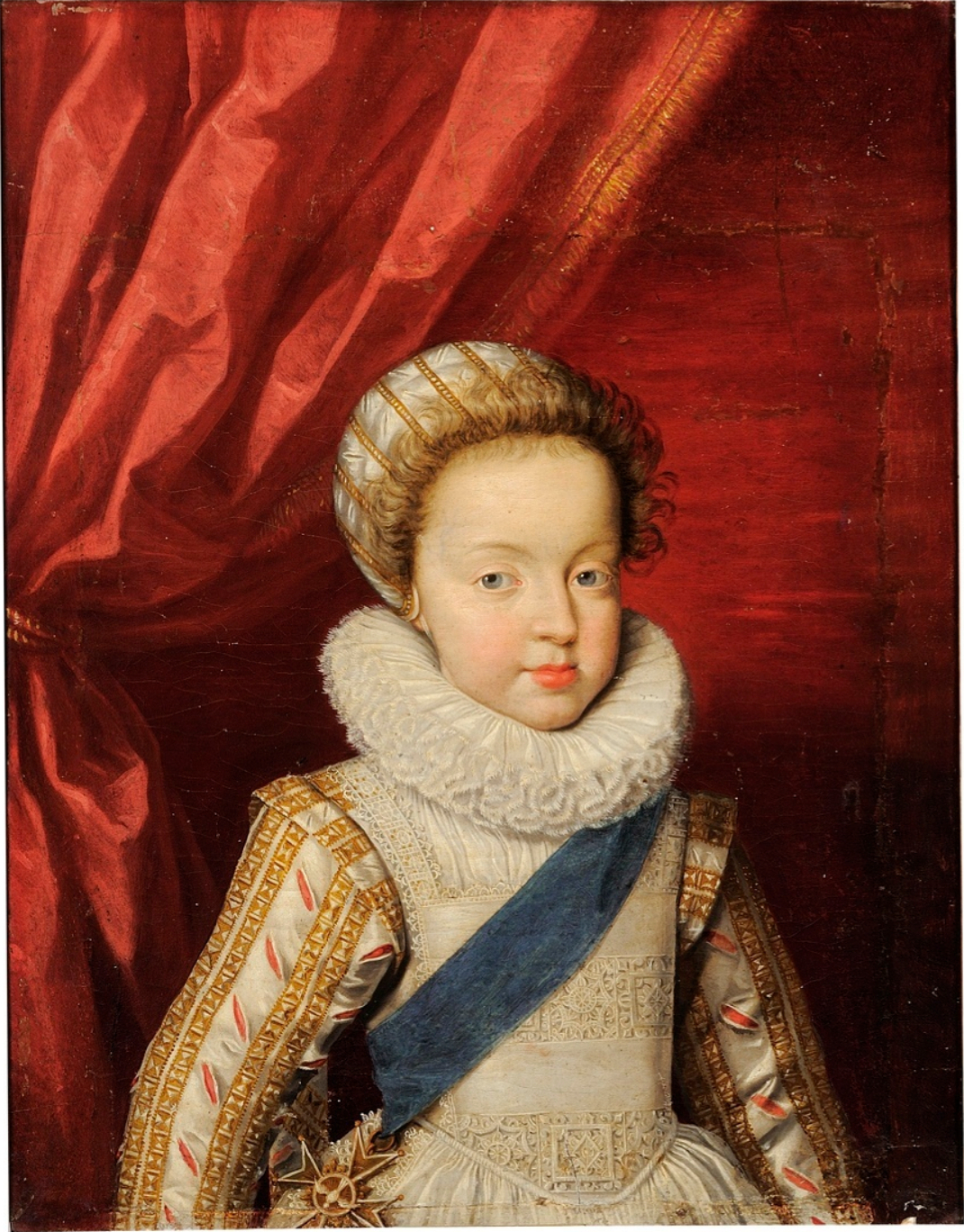
Portrait by Frans Pourbus the Younger, 1611

Gaston Jean Baptiste was born at the Palace of Fontainebleau on 24 April 1608 and at birth was given the title of Duke of Anjou. As a child, he was raised under the supervision of the royal governess Françoise de Montglat. In 1626, at the time of his marriage to the young Marie de Bourbon, Duchess of Montpensier, he received in appanage (with their respective titles) the duchies of Orléans and Chartres, and the county of Blois. He had nominal command of the army which besieged La Rochelle in 1628, having already entered upon a course of political intrigue that would occupy the remainder of his life. He was the heir presumptive to the throne of France from the death of his brother Monsieur d'Orléans in 1611 until the birth of his elder brother's first son in 1638.

On two occasions, he had to leave France for conspiring against the government of his brother and his Prime Minister Cardinal Richelieu. After waging an unsuccessful war in Languedoc leading to the Battle of Castelnaudary in 1632, he took refuge in Flanders. Reconciled with his brother Louis XIII, he plotted against Richelieu in 1635, fled from the country again, and then submitted to the King and the Cardinal.

Soon afterwards, the same process repeated itself. Orléans conspired with the marquis de Cinq-Mars to attempt Richelieu's assassination, and then deserted his unfortunate accomplice (1642). In 1643, upon the death of Louis XIII, Gaston became lieutenant-general of the kingdom, and fought against Spain on the northern frontiers of France. He was created duc d'Alençon in 1646. During the wars of the Fronde (1648–1653), he demonstrated no particular loyalty to the crown and passed with great facility from one side to the other.

== Marriages ==
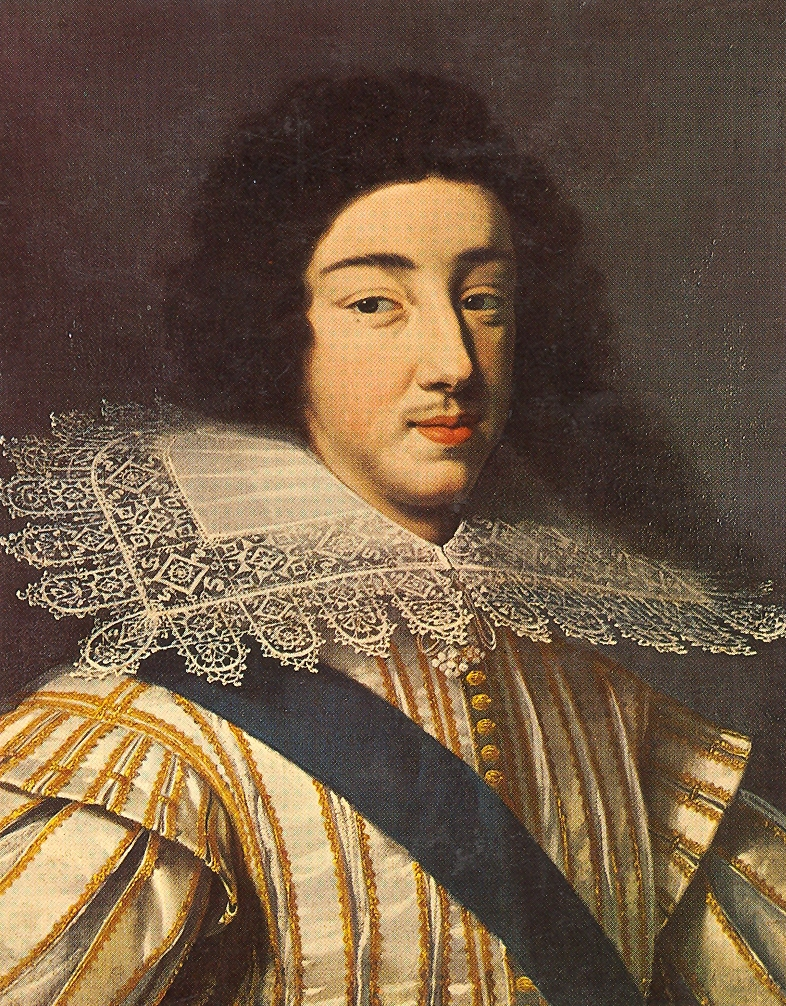
Portrait c. 1627

Gaston first married on 6 August 1626, at Nantes to Marie de Bourbon, Duchess of Montpensier, daughter and heiress of Henri de Bourbon, Duke of Montpensier. They had a daughter, Anne Marie Louise d'Orléans, Duchess of Montpensier (29 May 1627 – 5 April 1693), called Mademoiselle de Montpensier, but later being best known as the Grande Mademoiselle.

Marie de Bourbon died six days after giving birth (4 June 1627), leaving her daughter the last of the line of the Montpensier line of the House of Bourbon.

While taking refuge from the wrath of Cardinal Richelieu in Lorraine, Gaston fell in love at first sight with Marguerite of Lorraine, the sister of Charles IV, Duke of Lorraine. But as France and Lorraine were then enemies, he was refused the king's permission to marry a sister of its duke. Nonetheless, Gaston fled again to Lorraine and, in a secret ceremony in the presence of her family at Nancy during the night of 2 – 3 January 1632, Gaston took the princess Marguerite as his wife. Because he had not obtained the prior permission of his elder brother, the king – one of his many acts of defiance – the couple could not appear at the French court and the marriage was kept secret.

But in November of that year, Henri II, Duke of Montmorency, on his way to the scaffold, betrayed Gaston, his former co-conspirator, and Louis XIII and Richelieu learnt of the elopement. The king had his brother's marriage declared null and void by the Parlement of Paris in September 1634 and, despite the protest of Pope Urban VIII, the Assembly of the French clergy held in September 1635 that a prince du sang could enter matrimony only with permission of the king – consistent with French sovereignty and custom. Although Marguerite and Gaston had re-celebrated their marriage before the Archbishop of Malines, a French emissary persuaded the Pope not to protest the matter publicly, and Gaston formally accepted the annulment of his marriage. It was not until Louis XIII was on his deathbed in May 1643 that he accepted his brother's plea for forgiveness and authorized his marriage to Marguerite, whereupon the couple undertook nuptials for the third time in July 1643 before the Archbishop of Paris at Meudon, and the Duke and Duchess of Orléans were finally received at court.

By right of her marriage, Marguerite became known as Madame at court. After the death of his mother in 1642, Gaston was bequeathed the Luxembourg Palace, which became the couple's Parisian residence under the name Palais Orléans once they were restored to royal favour. They also sojourned at the Château de Blois, in the Loire Valley, where their first child was born in 1645.

Marguerite and Gaston d'Orléans had five children, of whom three daughters survived into adulthood:

- Marguerite Louise d'Orléans (28 July 1645 – 17 September 1721) married Cosimo III de' Medici, Grand Duke of Tuscany and had issue-but line died out.
- Élisabeth Marguerite d'Orléans (26 December 1646 – 17 March 1696) married Louis Joseph of Lorraine, Duke of Guise and had issue-but line died out.
- Françoise Madeleine d'Orléans (13 October 1648 – 14 January 1664) married Charles Emmanuel II, Duke of Savoy but died childless.
- Jean Gaston d'Orléans, Duke of Valois (17 August 1650 – 10 August 1652) died in infancy.
- Marie Anne d'Orléans (9 November 1652 – 17 August 1656) died in infancy.

Gaston had an illegitimate daughter by Marie Porcher:

- Marie bâtarde d'Orléans (1 January 1631, Paris – ?).

He also had an illegitimate son by Louise-Roger de La Marbelière:

- Louis bâtard d'Orléans, chevalier de Charny, (13 January 1638, Joué les Tours – 1692, Spain), later General under the service of Spain.

== Later life ==

After the death of Gaston's brother Louis XIII in 1643, his nephew Philippe, brother of the new king Louis XIV, became the new Monsieur. To differentiate the older Monsieur from the younger, Gaston, the uncle, was called Le Grand Monsieur and Philippe, the nephew, was called Le Petit Monsieur.

After the Fronde, Gaston was exiled by Cardinal Mazarin to Blois in 1652, and remained there until his death. All of his Orléans titles then went to his nephew, now the only Monsieur.

== Ancestors ==
Ancestors of Gaston of France

8. Charles, Duke of Vendôme
4. Anthony of Navarre
9. Françoise of Alençon
2. Henry IV of France and III of Navarre
10. Henry II of Navarre
5. Joan III of Navarre
11. Marguerite of Angoulême
1. Gaston of France
12. Cosimo I de' Medici, Grand Duke of Tuscany
6. Francesco I de' Medici, Grand Duke of Tuscany
13. Eleanor of Toledo
3. Marie de' Medici
14. Ferdinand I, Holy Roman Emperor
7. Joanna of Austria
15. Anne of Bohemia and Hungary

== See also ==
- Chalais conspiracy
- Charles de Lorme, personal medical doctor to Gaston
- List of works by James Pradier
