= Françoise Madeleine d'Orléans =

Duchess of Savoy from 1663 to 1664

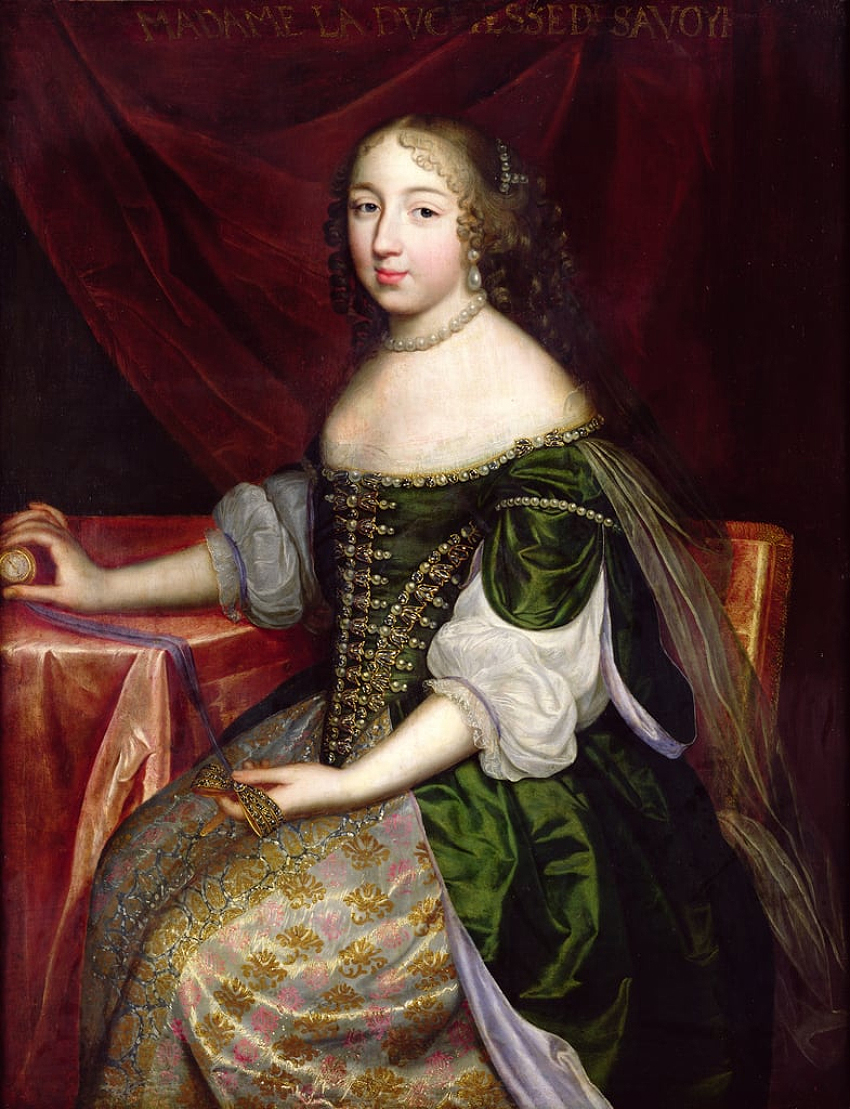
- Portrait attributed to Charles Beaubrun

Duchess consort of Savoy
- Tenure: 4 March 1663 – 14 January 1664
- Born: 13 October 1648; Saint Germain en Laye, France
- Died: 14 January 1664 (aged 15); Royal Palace of Turin, Savoy
- Burial: Turin Cathedral
- Spouse: Charles Emmanuel II, Duke of Savoy
- House: Orléans
- Father: Gaston d'Orléans
- Mother: Marguerite of Lorraine

Françoise Madeleine d'Orléans (13 October 1648 – 14 January 1664) was born a Princess of France and was the Duchess of Savoy as the first wife of Charles Emmanuel II. She was the first cousin of Louis XIV as well as of her husband. She was the shortest-serving Savoyard consort, dying at the age of 15.

== Biography ==
Arms of Françoise Madeleine d'Orléans while Duchess of Savoy

Françoise Madeleine was born at the Château de Saint Germain en Laye outside Paris in 1648. She was the youngest surviving daughter of Gaston d'Orléans and his second wife Marguerite of Lorraine. From birth, she was styled Mademoiselle de Valois, derived from one of her father's subsidiary titles. She was the favourite sister of La Grande Mademoiselle, the famous heiress. She grew up in the company of her sisters and Mademoiselle de La Vallière, future mistress of Louis XIV. She resided at the Château de Blois. Her father died in 1660 and her mother remained unmarried.

As French court etiquette dictated, she held the status of a Granddaughter of France as a male line descendant of the late king Henry IV of France. She was styled as a petite-fille de France.

Under the influence of her paternal aunt Christine Marie, Dowager Duchess of Savoy, she was engaged to her first cousin Charles Emmanuel II, Duke of Savoy. Christine Marie had chosen her as she had wanted to maintain her power and influence in government having previously been regent for her son since 1637. The match was approved of by Cardinal Mazarin who had previously rejected Marie Jeanne of Savoy, another candidate for Charles Emmanuel II. Françoise Madeleine proved suitably docile and was chosen over Marie Jeanne.

Françoise Madeleine married the Duke of Savoy by proxy at the Palais du Louvre on 4 March 1663. The couple met for the first time at Annecy on 3 April 1663 where they were married officially. The couple travelled to Turin, capital of Savoy, where they arrived on 15 June 1663. She was known as Francesca Maddalena d'Orléans in her adopted Savoy.

The Duchess soon died on 14 Jan 1664 at the Royal Palace of Turin, leaving her husband without an heir. She was buried at Turin Cathedral where she rests today. Her husband, inconsolable at her death, ordered a lavish funeral. After Françoise Madeleine's death, Louis XIV tried to engage La Grande Mademoiselle to Charles Emmanuel II, who refused the match. He later married again to Marie Jeanne of Savoy, by whom he had a son.

== Ancestors ==
Ancestors of Françoise Madeleine d'Orléans

16. Charles, Duke of Vendôme
8. Antoine of Navarre
17. Françoise of Alençon
4. Henry IV of France
18. Henry II of Navarre
9. Jeanne III of Navarre
19. Marguerite of Angoulême
2. Gaston, Duke of Orléans
20. Cosimo I de' Medici, Grand Duke of Tuscany
10. Francesco I de' Medici, Grand Duke of Tuscany
21. Eleanor of Toledo
5. Marie de' Medici
22. Ferdinand I, Holy Roman Emperor
11. Joanna of Austria
23. Anne of Bohemia and Hungary
1. Françoise Madeleine of Orléans
24. Francis I, Duke of Lorraine
12. Charles III, Duke of Lorraine
25. Christina of Denmark
6. Francis II, Duke of Lorraine
26. Henry II of France
13. Claude of Valois
27. Catherine de' Medici
3. Marguerite of Lorraine
28. John VII, Count of Salm-Badenweiler
14. Paul, Count of Salm-Brandenburg
29. Louise de Stainville
7. Christina of Salm
30. Tanneguy Le Veneur, Comte de Tillières
15. Marie Le Veneur de Tillières
31. Madeleine Hélie de Pompadour

== Sources ==
- Anselme de Sainte-Marie, Père (1726). Histoire généalogique et chronologique de la maison royale de France [Genealogical and chronological history of the royal house of France] (in French). Vol. 1 (3rd ed.). Paris: La compagnie des libraires.
- Fraser, Antonia (2006). Love and Louis XIV; The Women in the Life of the Sun King. London: Anchor Books.
- Oresko, Robert (2004). "Maria Giovanna Battista of Savoy-Nemours (1644–1724): daughter, consort, and Regent of Savoy". In Campbell Orr, Clarissa (ed.). Queenship in Europe 1660–1815: The Role of the Consort. Cambridge University Press. pp. 16–55. ISBN 0-521-81422-7.
- Sackville-West, Vita (1959). Daughter of France: The life of Anne Marie Louise d'Orléans, duchesse de Montpensier 1627-1693. London: Michael Joseph.
- Williams, H. Noel (1909). A Rose of Savoy, Marie Adelaide of Savoy, duchesse de Bourgogne, Mother of Louis XV. New York: Charles Scribner's Sons.

Media related to Françoise Madeleine d'Orléans at Wikimedia Commons

Françoise Madeleine d'Orléans House of Orléans Cadet branch of the House of Bourbon Born: 13 October 1648 Died: 14 January 1664
Italian royalty
Vacant Title last held by Christine of France	Duchess consort of Savoy; 4 March 1663 – 14 January 1664	Vacant Title next held by Marie Jeanne of Savoy
Titles in pretence
Vacant Title last held by Christine of France	Queen consort of Cyprus; 4 March 1663 – 14 January 1664	Vacant Title next held by Marie Jeanne of Savoy
