= Anne Marie Louise d'Orléans, Duchess of Montpensier =

La Grande Mademoiselle (1627–1693)

Anne Marie Louise d'Orléans
- La Grande Mademoiselle; Duchess of Montpensier
- Born: 29 May 1627; Palais du Louvre, Paris, France
- Died: 5 April 1693 (aged 65); Palais du Luxembourg, Paris, France
- Burial: 19 April 1693; Royal Basilica, Saint Denis, France
- House: Bourbon
- Father: Gaston, Duke of Orléans
- Mother: Marie, Duchess of Montpensier
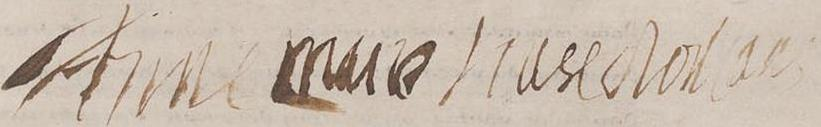
- Signature

Anne Marie Louise d'Orléans, Duchess of Montpensier, (French pronunciation: [an maʁi lwiz dɔʁleɑ̃], 29 May 1627 – 5 April 1693) known as La Grande Mademoiselle ([la ɡʁɑ̃d madmwazɛl], lit. 'The Great Miss'), was the only daughter of Gaston d'Orléans with his first wife, Marie, Duchess of Montpensier. One of the greatest heiresses in history, she died unmarried and childless, leaving her vast fortune to her cousin Philippe I, Duke of Orléans. After a string of proposals from various members of European ruling families, including Charles II of England, Afonso VI of Portugal, and Charles Emmanuel II of Savoy, she eventually fell in love with the courtier Antoine Nompar de Caumont and scandalised the court of France when she asked Louis XIV for permission to marry him, as such a union was viewed as a mésalliance. She is best remembered for her role in the Fronde, for bringing the composer Jean-Baptiste Lully to the king's court, and for her Mémoires.

== Early years ==
Anne Marie Louise d'Orléans was born at the Palais du Louvre in Paris on 29 May 1627. Her father was Gaston, Duke of Orléans; as the eldest surviving brother of King Louis XIII, he was known at court by the traditional honorific Monsieur. Her mother, 21-year-old Marie, Duchess of Montpensier, was the only surviving member of the Montpensier branch of the House of Bourbon. When she died five days after giving birth, she left the newborn Anne Marie, the new Duchess of Montpensier, heiress to an immense fortune which included five duchies, the Dauphinate of Auvergne, and the sovereign Principality of Dombes, found in the historical province of Burgundy.

As the eldest daughter of Monsieur, Anne Marie Louise was officially known as Mademoiselle from the time of her birth, and, because she was the granddaughter of a King of France, Henry IV, her uncle Louis XIII created for her the new title of Petite-Fille de France ("Granddaughter of France").

Mademoiselle was moved from the Louvre to the Palais des Tuileries and placed under the care of Madame de Saint Georges, the governess of royal children, who taught her how to read and write. Mademoiselle always had a great sense of self-importance and when asked about her maternal grandmother Henriette Catherine de Joyeuse she replied that she was not her grandmother, because her grandmother was "not a queen". She grew up in the company of Mademoiselle de Longueville, as well as the sisters of the Maréchal de Gramont.

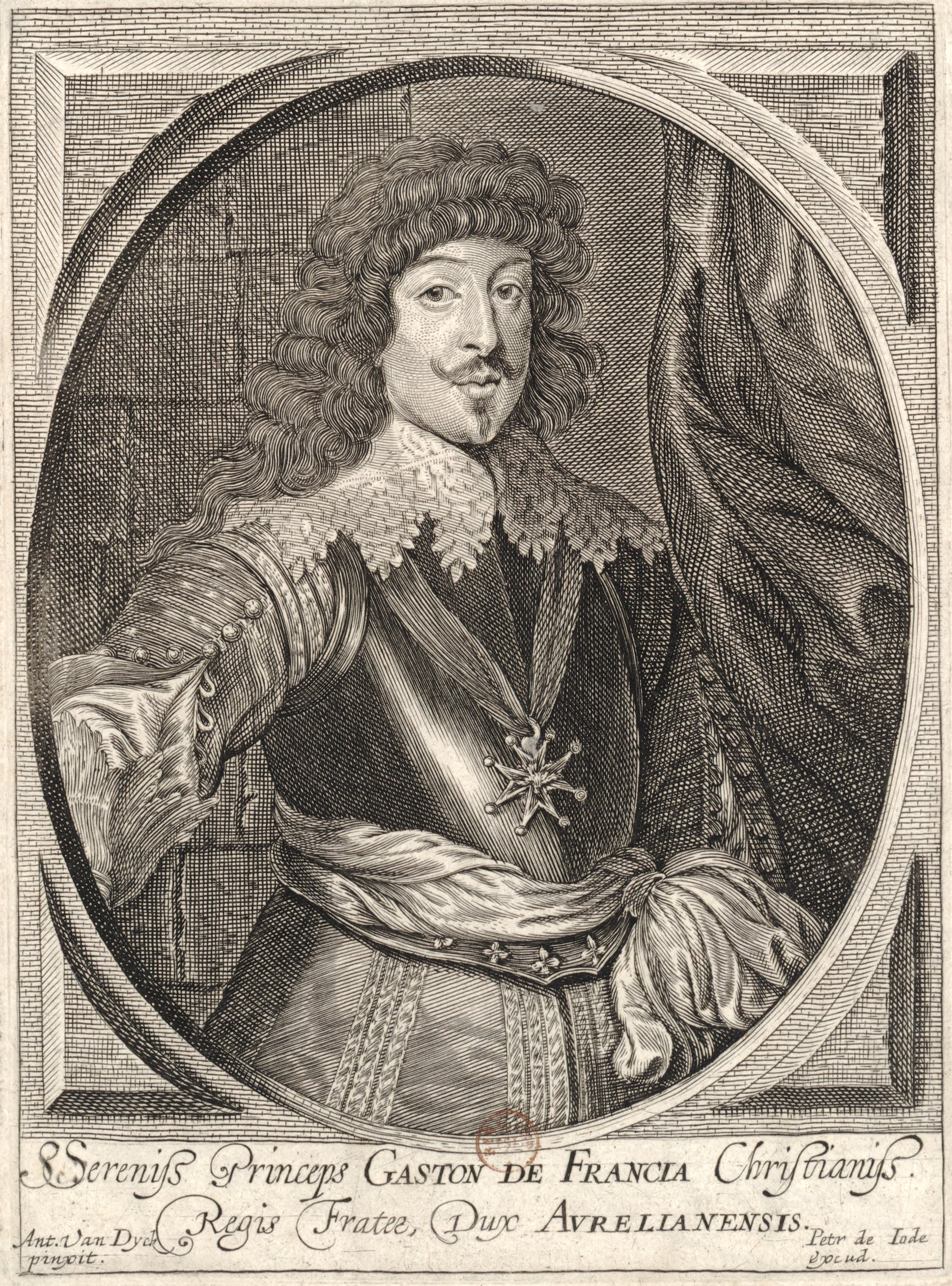
Mademoiselle's father, Gaston d'Orléans after a painting by Anthony van Dyck. Mademoiselle had a tender relationship with her father.

Mademoiselle was very close to her father Gaston, Duke of Orléans. Gaston was involved in multiple conspiracies against Louis XIII and his chief advisor Cardinal Richelieu, and generally on bad terms with the court. When Gaston fell in love with Marguerite of Lorraine, Louis XIII refused to give his brother permission to marry— France and Lorraine were enemies, and a prince of the blood and heir to the throne was not legally allowed to marry without the king's permission. Nonetheless, Gaston secretly married Marguerite in January 1632. When Louis found out, he had the marriage annulled and the couple exiled from court.

As a child, Mademoiselle lived with her governess at the Palais des Tuileries. Gaston resided at Blois, where Mademoiselle visited him frequently. After his secret marriage, Mademoiselle did not see her father for two years. When she finally did see him again in October 1634, the seven-year-old Mademoiselle "flung herself into his arms". After learning that Cardinal Richelieu, her godfather, was behind her father's exile, Mademoiselle would sing street songs and lampoons in the presence of the cardinal himself, earning her a scolding from the cardinal.

At the birth of the future Louis XIV in September 1638, the determined Mademoiselle decided that she would marry him, calling him "her little husband" to the amusement of Louis XIII. Richelieu subsequently reprimanded her for her remarks. Her father on the other hand wanted her to marry Louis, Count of Soissons, a descendant of Charles, Duke of Vendôme, one of his old co-conspirators. The marriage never materialised.

When Mademoiselle's governess, Madame de Saint Georges, died in 1643, Mademoiselle's father chose Madame de Fiesque as her replacement. Mademoiselle was devastated at the death of her former governess and, not keen on having a new governess, was an awkward student; she later recalled that she once locked Madame de Fiesque in her room and Madame de Fiesque's grandson in another.

On his deathbed in May 1643, Louis XIII finally accepted Gaston's plea for forgiveness and authorized his marriage to Marguerite; the couple were married in July 1643 before the Archbishop of Paris and, as the Duke and Duchess of Orléans, were finally received at court.

Louis XIII's death left Louis XIV (then 4 years old) as King of France, and Louis XIII's widow Queen Anne as regent during her son's minority. When the wife of Holy Roman Emperor Ferdinand III died in May 1646, Mademoiselle considered marriage to Ferdinand, but the regent, Queen Anne, under the influence of Mazarin, ignored Mademoiselle's pleas. Louis XIV (then 8 years old) and his younger brother, Philippe, Duke of Anjou (then 6 years old) were too young to be married. Queen Anne suggested her brother, Cardinal Ferdinand of Austria, but Mademoiselle declined. The "wealthiest single princess of Europe" was left without suitable marriage prospects.

== Fronde ==
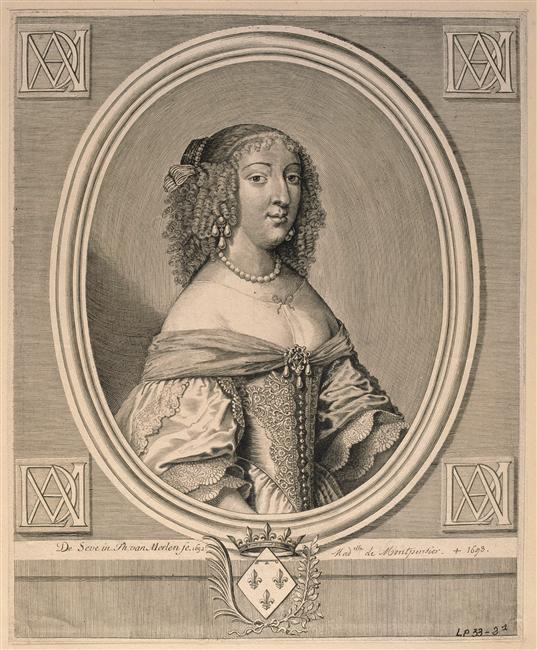
Mademoiselle in 1652 by Gilbert de Seve

One of the key areas of the life of Mademoiselle was her involvement in the period of French history known as the Fronde, a civil war in France marked by two distinct phases known as the Fronde Parlementaire (1648–1649) and the Fronde des nobles (1650–1653). The former was precipitated by a tax levied on judicial officers of the Parlement of Paris that was met with a refusal to pay and the emergence of Louis de Bourbon, Prince of Condé (future Grand Condé), as a rebel figure who took the city of Paris by siege. The influence of Cardinal Mazarin was also opposed.

At the Peace of Rueil of 1 April 1649, the Fronde Parlementaire ended, and the court returned to Paris in August amid great celebration. Mademoiselle caught smallpox, but survived the illness. Having convalesced, Mademoiselle befriended Claire Clémence de Brézé, Madame la Princesse, the unwanted wife of the Grand Condé. The pair sojourned in Bordeaux, where Mademoiselle was involved in the peace which ended the siege in the city in October 1650. Her role in the matter made her look like a frondeuse in the eyes of Queen Anne.

Even in uncertain times, the possibility of a marriage between Mademoiselle and the Prince of Condé arose when Claire Clémence became critically ill with erysipelas. Mademoiselle considered the proposal, as she would still have maintained her rank as one of the most important women at court, and her father had a good relationship with Condé. These plans failed, however, when Claire Clémence recovered.

In 1652, there was another Fronde, this time involving the Princes of the Blood. Mazarin was in exile and was not recalled until October 1653. The city of Orléans, Mademoiselle's namesake and the capital of her father's duchy, wanted to stay neutral in the civil war; the magistrates of the city had seen what the war had done to the nearby area of Blaisons and wanted to avoid the same fate. The city requested the input of Mademoiselle's father in order to avoid being pillaged. Gaston was undecided and Mademoiselle took it upon herself to go to Orléans to represent her father and put an end to the troubles. Travelling via Artenay, Mademoiselle was informed that the city would not receive her because she and the king were on different sides, referring to Mademoiselle's dislike for Mazarin.

When Mademoiselle arrived at Orléans, the city gates were locked and the city refused to open them. She shouted that they should open the gates, but was ignored. An approaching boatman offered to row her to the Porte de La Faux, a gate on the river. Mademoiselle got onboard "climbing like a cat" and "jumping over the hedge" in order not to hurt herself and climbed through a gap in the gate. She entered the city and was greeted triumphantly, being carried through the streets of Orléans on a chair for all to see. She later said that she had never been "in so entrancing a situation".

Staying for five weeks, she became attached, calling it "my town", before returning to Paris in May 1652. Paris was once again under a state of panic on the eve of the Battle of the Faubourg St Antoine; Mademoiselle, in order to allow the Prince of Condé into the city, which was controlled by Turenne, fired from the Bastille on the army of Turenne on 2 July 1652. Mazarin remarked "with that cannon, Mademoiselle has shot her husband."

== Exile ==
Fearing for her life, Mademoiselle fled Paris for the safety of her residence at Saint-Fargeau. She remained in exile until 1657 when she was welcomed to the court once again. She went with Madame de Fiesque and Madame de Frontenac, wife of the future Governor General of New France.

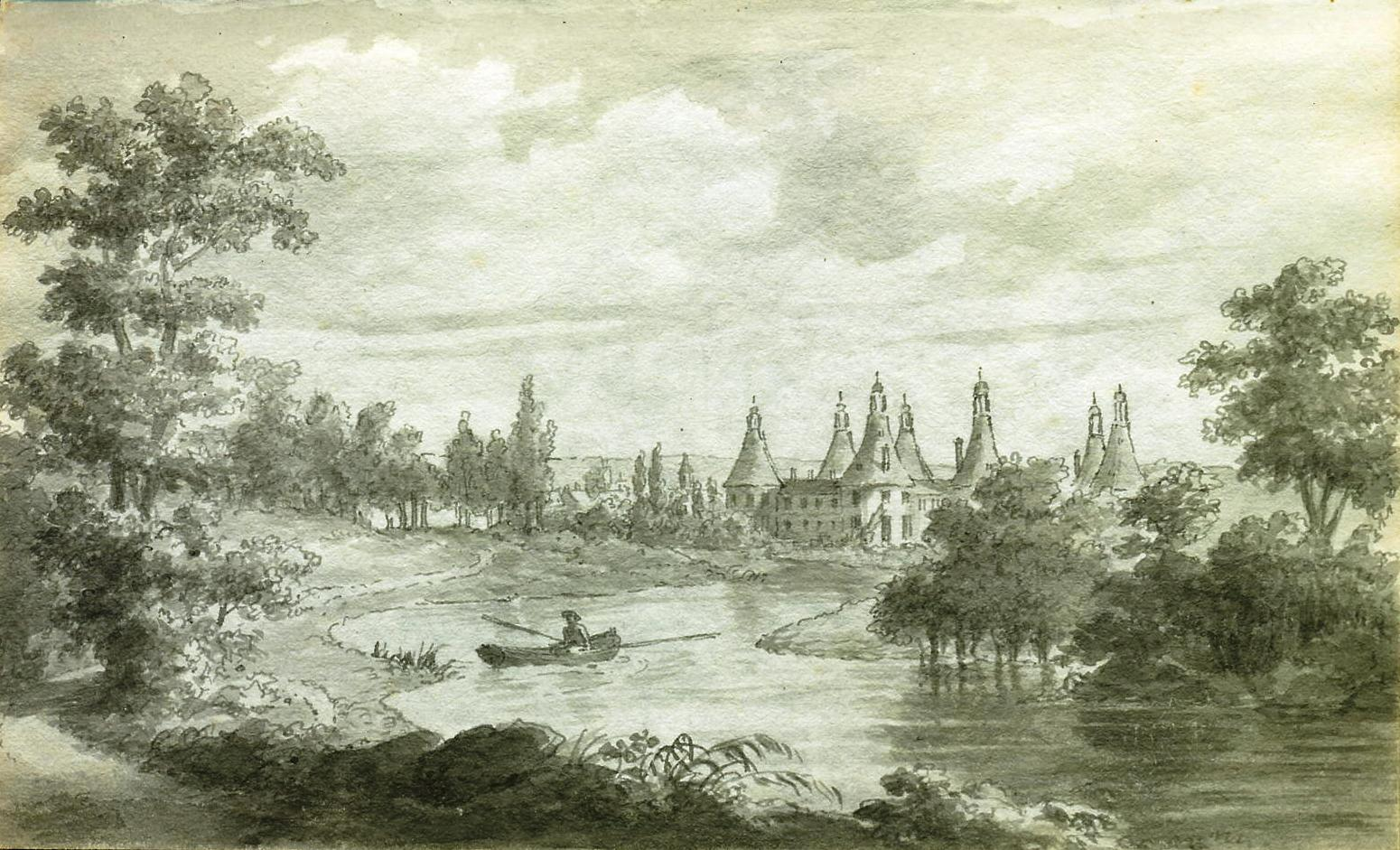
A view of Saint-Fargeau where Mademoiselle stayed in her exile

Having never been to Saint-Fargeau before, she was unaware of the state of the building and thus stayed at a small residence in Dannery having been received by the bailiff of her estates. Convinced to return to Saint-Fargeau, she settled into her home for the next four years and soon began to improve the building under the direction of François Le Vau, brother of the renowned architect Louis Le Vau.

Le Vau redid the exteriors of Saint-Fargeau at a cost of 200,000 livres. They were lost in a fire in 1752 and suffered further damage in 1850, thus all evidence of the appearance of Mademoiselle's residence was lost. Despite being an exile, she still visited her father at Blois. While at Saint-Fargeau, she dabbled in writing and wrote a small biography under the title of Madame de Fouquerolles despite her bad spelling and grammar. Mademoiselle looked to her financial affairs, which had been under her father's management. Having reached her majority in 1652 it was discovered that her father had not been entirely honest with the management of her finances and that was the reason for her 800,000 livres of debt. At the same time her grandmother, the Dowager Duchess of Guise, tricked Mademoiselle into signing away money to her under false pretences. Her father was involved with this, which caused her relationship with Gaston to deteriorate. In 1656, hearing that her father had been excused for his various scandals, Mademoiselle herself said she would forget the bad blood caused by his financial misdemeanours and resumed her close relationship with him.

=== Return to court and family life ===
When her father was welcomed back to court, it paved the way for Mademoiselle. She left for Sedan, Ardennes, where the court was established in July 1657. Having not seen any of her family for some five years, she was greeted with forgiveness and the added compliment that her "looks had improved", according to Queen Anne.

In a pen portrait of herself executed later the same year, she noted how she was neither "fat nor thin" and "looked healthy; my bosom is fairly well formed; my hands and arms not beautiful, but the skin is good...". The same year, she met Christina of Sweden, who had arrived in France in July 1656. The two ladies met at Essonne where they watched a ballet together. Mademoiselle later exclaimed that Christina "surprised me very much. [...] She was in all respects a most extraordinary creature".

"Greatness of birth and the advantages bestowed by wealth [...] should provide all the elements of a happy life...yet there are many people who have had all these things and are not happy. The events of my own past would give me enough proof of this without looking for examples everywhere"
Mademoiselle on the subject of her wealth

At court, her cousins Louis XIV and Philippe, Duke of Anjou were nineteen and seventeen, respectively. Mademoiselle's part in the Fronde had ruined her dream of becoming Louis's consort, but the Duke of Anjou briefly courted her. Despite toying with the idea, Mademoiselle was put off by the Duke's immaturity, saying that he always stayed near his mother as if he was "like a child".

Mademoiselle fell ill in Paris during September 1657, when she bought the Château d'Eu from Mademoiselle de Guise (her maternal aunt) at the end of her illness before returning to her beloved Saint-Fargeau for Christmas.

In February 1660, Gaston died of a stroke at Blois. As his eldest daughter Mademoiselle was his principal heiress, and Gaston left her a considerable fortune that added to her already vast personal wealth. As a result of her mourning her father, Mademoiselle was only allowed to go to the formal marriage between Louis and his new spouse Maria Theresa of Austria; however, Mademoiselle did go to the proxy ceremony incognito, fooling no one. The next marriage at court was between Philippe, the Duke of Orléans, known as Monsieur, and Princess Henrietta of England (youngest child of Queen Henrietta Maria and the dead Charles I of England) on 31 March 1661. Mademoiselle was in attendance with various other members of the court.

Philippe and Henrietta formed a stormy couple. Philippe was an overt bisexual and openly lived with his male lovers at the Palais Royal, much to the dislike of Henrietta. In retaliation, she openly flirted with Louis XIV as well as seduced Philippe's own lover the comte de Guiche. Mademoiselle was the godmother of Philippe and Henrietta's youngest child, the Mademoiselle de Valois, born in 1670. Once again at Henrietta's death in 1670, Louis XIV asked if Mademoiselle wanted to fill "the vacant place" that had been left by Henrietta, a suggestion she declined.

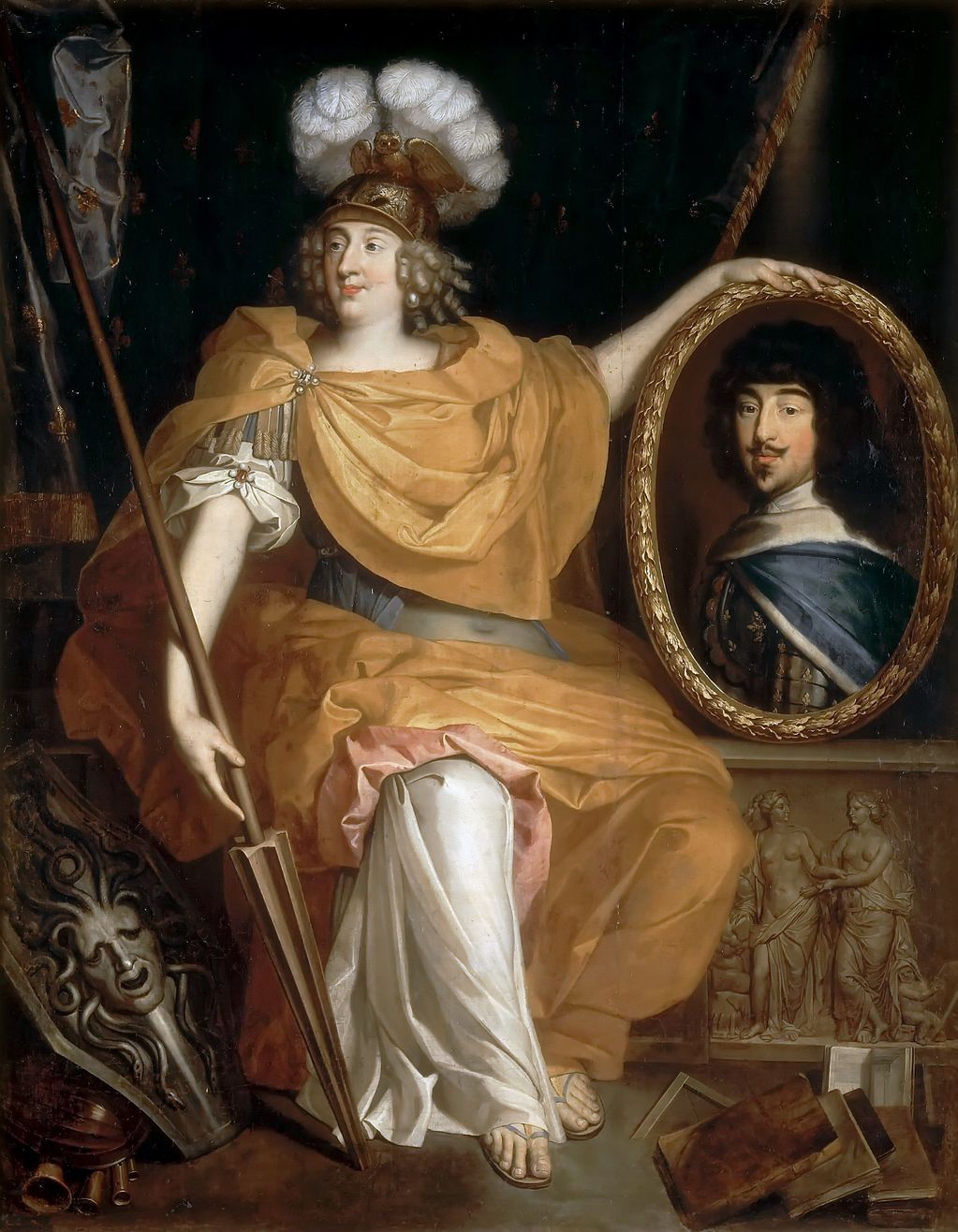
Mademoiselle as Minerva holding a portrait of her father, by Pierre Bourguignon (Musée de Versailles)

Mademoiselle and her younger half-sister Marguerite Louise enjoyed a close relationship. The two would go to the theatre and attend Mademoiselle's salon.

Marguerite Louise later asked her to sort out arrangements when the Grand Prince of Tuscany proposed an alliance in 1658. Mademoiselle was asked to ensure its fulfilment, a previous proposal from the Duke of Savoy having failed.

Initially overjoyed at the prospect of marrying, Marguerite Louise's ebullience faded to dismay when she discovered Mademoiselle no longer favoured the Tuscan match. After this, Marguerite Louise's behaviour became erratic: she shocked the court by going out unaccompanied with her cousin Prince Charles of Lorraine, who soon became her lover. Her proxy marriage did nothing to change her attitude and she attempted to abscond and go hunting, only to be stopped by Mademoiselle herself.

In 1663, Louis XIV again approached Mademoiselle with a possible match for her. The intended bridegroom was Alfonso VI of Portugal, who acceded to the Portuguese throne in 1656. The proud Mademoiselle ignored the idea, saying she would rather stay in France with her vast income and estates and that she did not want a husband who was rumoured to be alcoholic, impotent and paralytic. Alfonso instead married Marie Françoise of Savoy.

An angry Louis thus ordered her to return to Saint-Fargeau for having disobeyed him. This "exile" lasted roughly a year and during it she began to make repairs to the Château d'Eu, and started writing her memoirs. Appealing to Louis regarding her health, she was allowed to return to court, whereupon Louis proposed that she marry Charles Emmanuel II, Duke of Savoy, who had previously married Mademoiselle's younger half-sister Françoise Madeleine. Mademoiselle seemed very keen on the match, but Charles Emmanuel II was not, and he made various excuses to avoid it. This proposal was to be the last for la Grande Mademoiselle.

== Lauzun and later years ==
Away from court in 1666, Mademoiselle regretted not being present at the entertainments organised at the Château de Fontainebleau in honour of Queen Marie Thérèse that summer. At the entertainments was a man called Antoine Nompar de Caumont, later Duke of Lauzun, an impoverished nobleman from Guyenne. Close to the king, he was renowned for his wit as well as his evident "sex appeal", despite being "the smallest man God ever made". He was also a distinguished soldier and was part of the marriage negotiations between Louis XIV and Queen Marie Thérèse. Very opinionated and louche, Lauzun once saw Mademoiselle wearing a red ribbon in her hair and declared it too "youthful" for her, to which the proud Mademoiselle replied "people of my rank are always young".

Before long, Mademoiselle fell hopelessly in love with Lauzun. In December 1670, the most senior female at the court (behind Madame Royale, the only legitimate daughter of Louis XIV) she asked Louis XIV's permission to marry Lauzun. Louis consented, to the astonishment of his court and much to the dislike of Queen Marie Thérèse, Monsieur and various members of the court. The Queen and Monsieur refused to sign the marriage contract. The date for the ceremony was set to occur at the Louvre on Sunday, 21 December 1670. Lauzun even asked Louis's mistress Madame de Montespan to help convince the king to submit to the match. Mademoiselle was in high spirits later, stating that the days from 15 to 18 December 1670 were the happiest days of her life. She referred to Lauzun as "Monsieur le duc de Montpensier" to her friends.

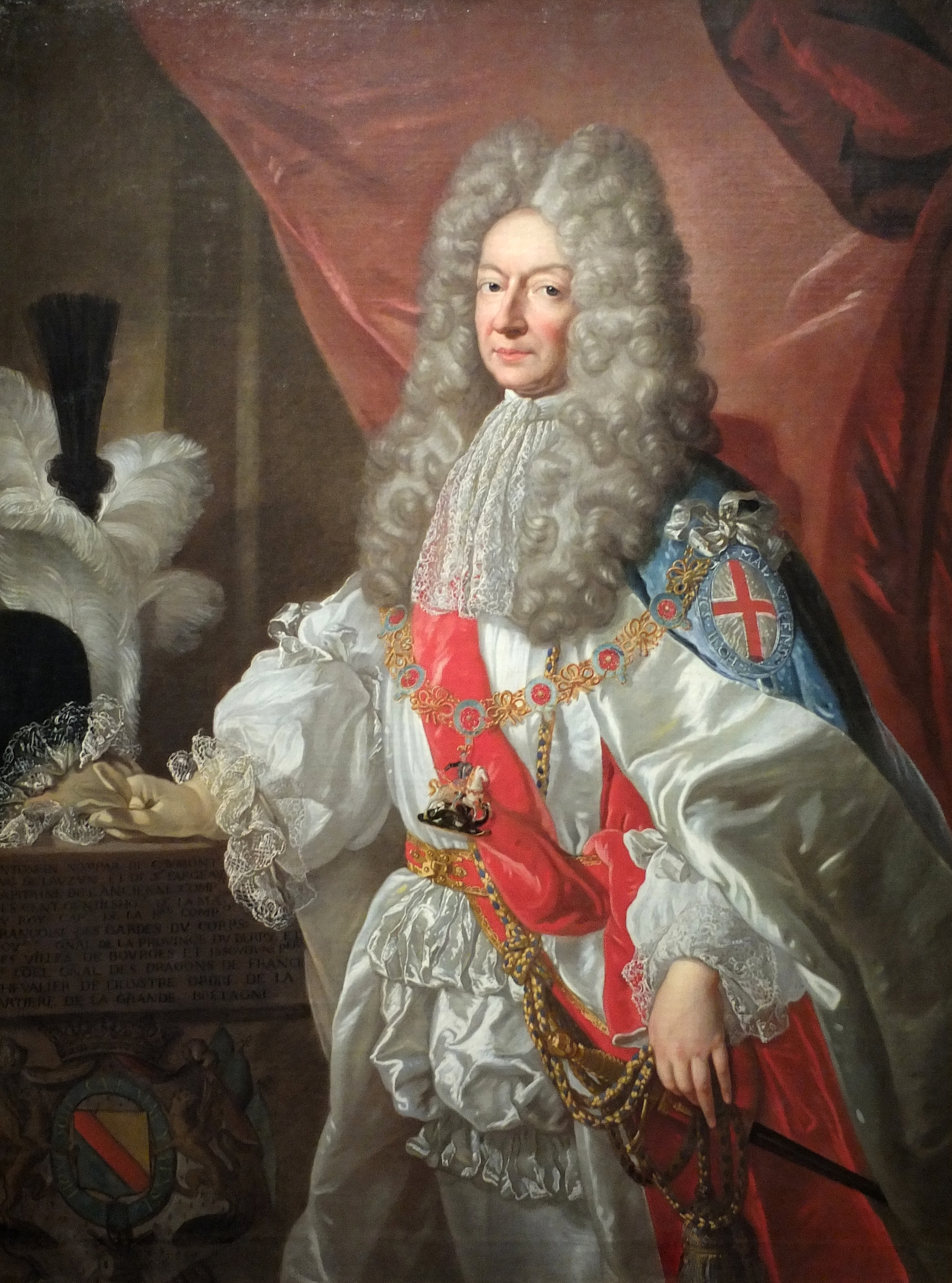
Antoine Nompar de Caumont by Alexis Simon Belle, Mademoiselle's only love interest

The joy was not to last; under pressure from a disapproving court, Louis XIV reversed his decision, and the engagement was called off on 18 December stating that it would damage his reputation. Mademoiselle was asked to have an interview with the king and Madame de Montespan. The former informed her of his decision, to which she responded, "what cruelty..!" Louis replied that "kings must please the public" and ruined Mademoiselle's hopes of marriage on that "unhappy Thursday", as she later called it.

Mademoiselle secluded herself in her apartments and did not reappear until the beginning of 1671, when she was informed of the arrest of Lauzun without an official reason released. He was taken to the Bastille and then the Pignerol fortress, where he remained until 1681 despite making several attempts to escape.

Determined to get Lauzun freed, Mademoiselle devoted herself to his interests and approached Madame de Montespan to try to encourage the king to release him. The release came at a cost; she would have to sell two of her most profitable lands: the principality of Dombes and the County of Eu. These titles would be given to Louis Auguste de Bourbon, Légitimé de France, Duke of Maine, eldest and favourite son of Louis and Montespan. Capitulating on 2 February 1681, Mademoiselle sold the lands, both of which had a great personal attachment to her. Unknown to Mademoiselle, she was only buying Lauzun's release and the right for him to live on her estates as an exile.

Lauzun was freed on 22 April 1681 and obliged to live quietly at Bourbon before returning to Paris, but not the court, rather at the Hôtel de Lauzun, in March 1682. Prior to the death of Queen Marie Thérèse in July 1683, the couple had been on bad terms when they again came together temporarily in their grief. Soon after the two had an interview, the last time they would ever see each other before Mademoiselle retired to her Parisian residence, the Palais du Luxembourg.

=== Death and burial ===
Mademoiselle fell ill on 15 March 1693 with what appears to have been stoppage of the bladder. Lauzun asked to see her, but due to her pride, Mademoiselle refused to admit him. She died at the Palais du Luxembourg in Paris on Sunday, 5 April 1693. As a "Granddaughter of France", the title she treasured so much, she was buried at the Royal Basilica of Saint Denis outside Paris on 19 April. At her funeral, according to Saint-Simon, she was noted as being "the wealthiest single princess of Europe". Lying in state, the urn containing her entrails exploded mid-ceremony, which caused chaos as people fled to avoid the smell. Eventually, the ceremony continued with the conclusion of it being "[...] another jest at the expense of Mademoiselle".

== Ancestry ==
Ancestors of Anne Marie Louise d'Orléans

8. Anthony of Navarre
4. Henry IV of France
9. Joan III of Navarre
2. Gaston, Duke of Orléans
10. Francesco I de' Medici, Grand Duke of Tuscany
5. Marie de' Medici
11. Johanna of Austria
1. Anne Marie Louise d'Orléans
12. François, Duke of Montpensier
6. Henri, Duke of Montpensier
13. Renée d'Anjou, Marquise of Mézières
3. Marie, Duchess of Montpensier
14. Henri, Duke of Joyeuse
7. Henriette Catherine, Duchess of Joyeuse
15. Catherine de Nogaret de La Valette

== Bibliography ==
- Barker, Nancy Nichols (1989). Brother to the Sun King, Philippe, Duke of Orléans. Johns Hopkins University Press. ISBN 9780801837913.
- Cartwright, Julia (1900). Madame: A life of Henrietta, daughter of Charles I and Duchess of Orléans. London: Seeley and Co. Ltd.
- Saintsbury, George (1911). "Montpensier, Anne Marie Louise d'Orléans, Duchesse de" . In Chisholm, Hugh (ed.). Encyclopædia Britannica. Vol. 18 (11th ed.). Cambridge University Press. pp. 789–790.
- Cowart, Georgia (2008). The triumph of pleasure: Louis XIV & the politics of spectacle. University of Chicago Press. ISBN 978-0-226-11638-9.
- Fraser, Antonia (2006). Love and Louis XIV: The Women in the Life of the Sun King. London: Anchor Books. ISBN 978-0-7538-2293-7.
- Hilton, Lisa (2002). Athénaïs: The Real Queen of France. London: Little Brown. ISBN 0-316-85878-1.
- Mitford, Nancy (1966). The Sun King. London: Penguin Publishing. ISBN 0-14-023967-7.
- Pitts, Vincent Joseph (2000). La Grande Mademoiselle at the Court of France. The Johns Hopkins University Press. ISBN 0-8018-6466-6.
- Sackville-West, Vita (1959). Daughter of France: The life of Anne Marie Louise d'Orléans, duchesse de Montpensier 1627–1693. London: Michael Joseph.
- Stokes, Hugh (1913). A Prince of Pleasure: Philip of France and His Court, 1640-1701. University of Virginia: H. Jenkins, Limited. ISBN 1230222510.
- Vatout, Jean (1830). Histoire du Palais-royal. Paris.

Anne Marie Louise d'Orléans, Duchess of Montpensier House of Bourbon Cadet branch of the House of Capet Born: 27 May 1627 Died: 5 April 1693
French nobility
Preceded by Marie de Bourbon	Dauphine of Auvergne; 4 June 1627 – 5 April 1693	Succeeded by Elisabeth Charlotte of the Palatinate
Preceded by Marie de Bourbon	Princess of Dombes; 4 June 1627 – 5 April 1693	Succeeded by Louis Auguste de Bourbon
Preceded by Marie de Bourbon	Duchess of Montpensier; 4 June 1627 – 5 April 1693	Succeeded by Philippe of France
Preceded by Marie de Lorraine	Princess of Joinville; 3 March 1688 – 5 April 1693	Succeeded by Philippe of France
