= Christina of Salm =

Duchess of Lorraine (1575–1627)

Christina
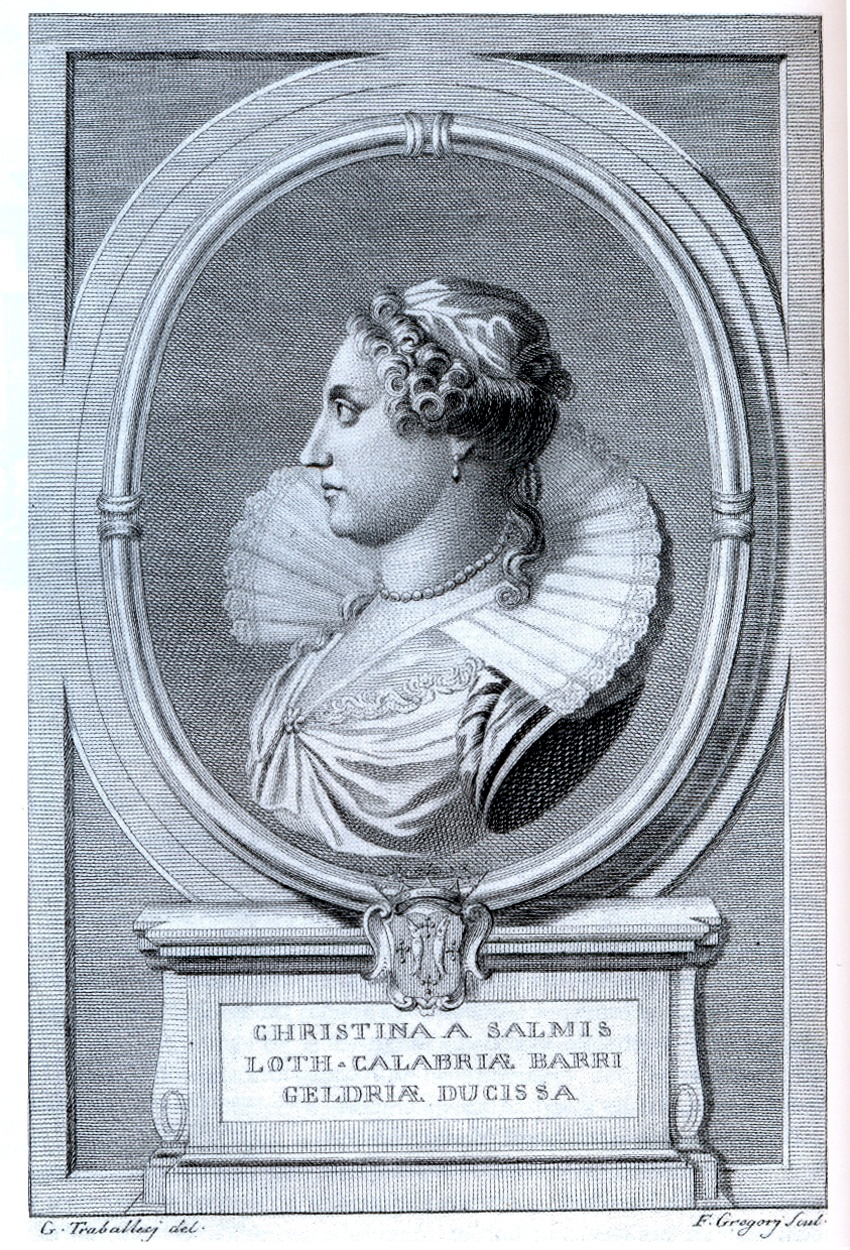
- Born: c. 1575
- Died: 31 December 1627
- Noble family: Salm
- Spouse: Francis II, Duke of Lorraine (m. 1597)
- Issue: Charles, Duke of Lorraine; Henriette, Princess of Lixheim; Nicolas, Duke of Lorraine; Marguerite, Duchess of Orléans
- Father: Paul of Salm
- Mother: Marie Le Veneur de Tillières

Countess Christina of Salm-Badenweiler (1575–1627), was a Duchess consort of Lorraine; married in 1597 to Francis II, Duke of Lorraine.

== Life ==
Christina Katharina was the only daughter and heiress of Count Paul of Salm-Brandenbourg (1548–1595), head of his branch of the House of Salm (1535–1595) by his wife, Marie Le Veneur de Tillières (1553–1600), of whom he was a second cousin-once-removed, the couple sharing descent from Philippe Lhuillier, seigneur de Manicamp, governor of the Bastille. She also inherited the land of her childless uncle Count Johann VIII of Salm-Badenweiler (d. 1600), Governor of Nancy, France. A division took place: some of the Badenweiler possessions were kept with her and later inherited by Lorraine; another half was kept within the House of Salm. From this Salm half later emerged the Principality of Salm.

Although the Salms had been sovereign Imperial counts since 1475, neither they nor the Le Veneurs were reckoned among the major magnates of either the Holy Roman Empire or of France in the 16th century. However, when Francis married Christina, he was only the third son of Duke Charles III, destined for the countship of Vaudémont as appanage rather than for the sovereignty of Lorraine. Indeed, to prevent the duchy from leaving the patriline (and to legitimate its usurpation), Francis and Christina's sons would eventually be wed to the two daughters of his elder brother, Duke Henry II of Lorraine.

== Issue ==
1. Henri de Lorraine, Marquis of Hattonchâtel (1602–1611) died in childhood;
2. Charles de Lorraine, Duke of Lorraine (1604–1675) married Nicolette de Lorraine, no issue; married secondly Béatrice de Cusance of Belvoir and had issue; married thirdly Marie Louise of Aspremont-Lynden, no issue;
3. Henriette de Lorraine (1605–1660), married Louis de Lorraine, Prince of Pfalzburg and Lixheim, legitimized son of Louis II, Cardinal of Guise by his mistress Aimerie de Lescheraine; no issue;
4. Nicolas de Lorraine, Duke of Lorraine (1609–1670) married Claude de Lorraine and had issue;
5. Marguerite de Lorraine (1615–1672), married Gaston de France, Duke of Orléans and had issue;
6. Christine de Lorraine (1621–1622) died in infancy.

== Ancestry ==
Ancestors of Christina of Salm

8. John VI, Count of Salm-Badenweiler
4. John VII, Count of Salm-Badenweiler
9. Anne de Haraucourt
2. Paul of Salm-Badenweiler
10. Louis, seigneur de Stainville
5. Claude de Stainville, dame de Lavincourt
11. Oudette Lhuillier
1. Christina of Salm
12. Jean IX Le Veneur, baron de Tillières-sur-Avre
6. Tanneguy I Le Veneur, comte de Tillières-sur-Avre
13. Gillonne de Montejean
3. Marie Le Veneur
14. François Hélie de Pompadour, vicomte de Comborn
7. Madeleine Hélie de Pompadour
15. Isabeau Picart, dame de Bosc-Achard

== Notes ==
Christina of Salm House of Salm Born: c. 1575 Died: 31 December 1627
Royal titles
Preceded by Margherita Gonzaga, Duchess of Lorraine	Duchess consort of Lorraine; 1625	Succeeded by Nicole, Duchess of Lorraine
