= Renaissance in Urbino =

Aspects of Renaissance art and culture in Urbino

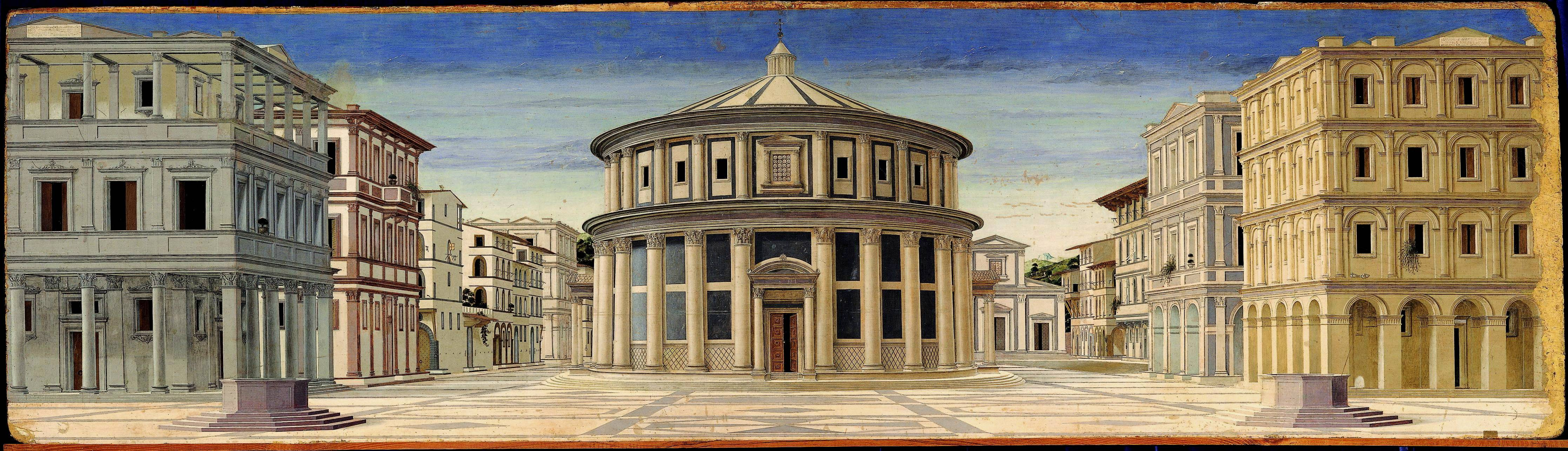
Anonymous Florentine, Ideal City (c. 1480–1490), National Gallery of the Marches, Urbino

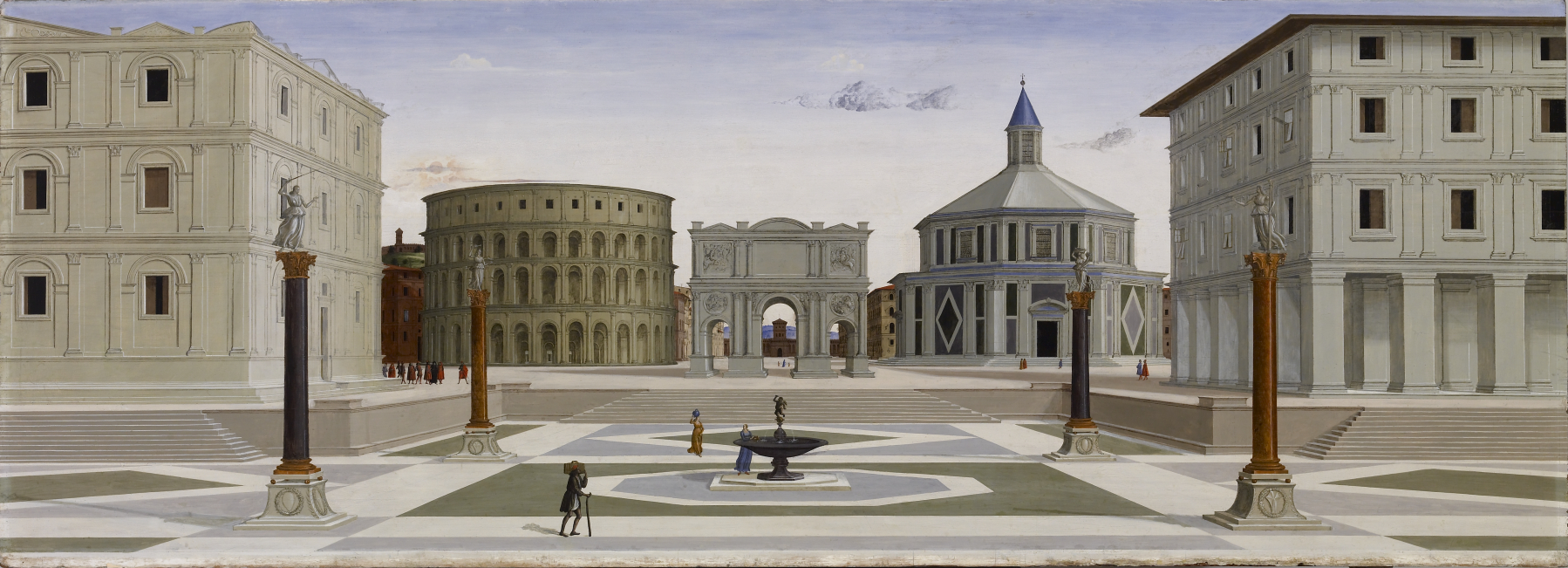
Anonymous Florentine, Ideal City (c. 1470–1480), Walters Art Museum, Baltimore

The Renaissance in Urbino was one of the most fundamental manifestations of the early Italian Renaissance.

During the lordship of Federico da Montefeltro, from 1444 to 1482, a fertile and vital artistic climate developed at the court, due to cultural exchanges with numerous centers on the peninsula and also abroad, especially the Flemish one. The cultural movement in Urbino was restricted within the court, around its highly refined prince, and although it elaborated highly advanced and avant-garde solutions, it did not generate a real local school, also due to the recourse mainly to foreign artists. Nevertheless, the Urbino style, by virtue of the very circulation of artists, experienced a wide diffusion, which made it one of the key variations of the Italian Renaissance. Among the basic characteristics of its humanistic culture were the unmistakable tone made of measure and rigor, which had protagonists such as Piero della Francesca, Luciano Laurana, Justus van Gent, Pedro Berruguete, Francesco di Giorgio Martini, and Fra Diamante.

According to French historian André Chastel, the Urbino Renaissance, called "mathematical," was one of the three fundamental components of the early Renaissance, along with the Florentine, "philological and philosophical," and the Paduan, "epigraphical and archaeological." Of the three it was the one "most closely related to the arts."

As the 16th century approached, the city, while remaining an island of highly refined culture, saw an impoverishment of its vitality in the figurative arts. Despite this, one of the great geniuses of the mature Renaissance, Raphael Sanzio, was born and took his very first steps in Urbino. From a cultural and literary point of view, on the other hand, Urbino remained for a long time one of the most stimulating environments in Italy, as witnessed by Baldassarre Castiglione, who set his Cortegiano at the court of Guidobaldo and Elisabetta da Montefeltro.

== Historical and cultural context ==
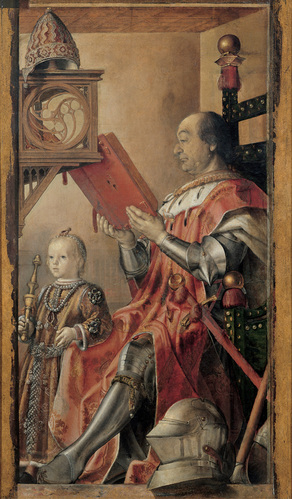
Pedro Berruguete, Portrait of Federico da Montefeltro with his son Guidobaldo (c. 1475), National Gallery of the Marches, Urbino

Federico da Montefeltro, a successful condottiero, highly skilled diplomat and enthusiastic patron of the arts and literature, was responsible for the transformation of the Duchy of Urbino from the capital of an economically depressed territory to one of the most fertile and refined artistic centers of the time.

In 1444 Federico took power after the death of his brother Oddantonio in a conspiracy.

At the time he was one of the most sought-after captains of fortune, but he had also received a rare humanistic education in Mantua, under Vittorino da Feltre. From the master he absorbed an interest in mathematics, which shaped much of his cultural interests and artistic commissions, and reflexively his interest in architecture, which he believed was based on arithmetic and geometry. This gave rise to André Chastel's interpretation of Urbino as the court of mathematical Humanism, which had in Piero della Francesca its greatest interpreter and to whose influence can be referred the work of Bartolomeo della Gatta, the only one in Urbino who seemed to understand Piero.

Federico set his hand to the pressing political problems and began a reorganization of the state, which included a reorganization of the city according to a modern, comfortable, rational, and beautiful style. All his efforts, in the nearly forty years of his rule, were directed toward this goal, which, due to his extraordinary talents combined with considerable good fortune, came within a whisker of full realization. The point of reference in this ambitious cultural project was immediately Florence and its innovations related to humanism and the Renaissance. With the Tuscan city, as early as 1444, an alliance and an atmosphere of mutual protection was established, which facilitated the exchange of artists and personalities.

Federico called Leon Battista Alberti, Paolo Uccello, Luciano Laurana, Francesco di Giorgio Martini, who wrote the Treatise on Architecture for him, and the mathematician Luca Pacioli to his court. He was also very interested in Flemish painting, beginning in the 70s, so much so that the duke called artists such as Pedro Berruguete and Justus van Gent to work with him, who developed a happy dialogue between the Nordic "realist" figurative tradition and the Italian "synthetic" one. Giovanni Santi, father of Raphael, wrote a poetic account of the leading artists of the period.

At the palace they discussed the form the "ideal city" should take, its perspective, and the historical and moral legacy of "illustrious men."

The Duke's library was famous, organized by the humanist Vespasiano da Bisticci, and was full of codices with valuable illuminated pages.

Federico, through Baldassarre Castiglione's descriptions in Il Cortegiano, introduced the characters of the so-called "gentleman" in Europe, which remained fully in vogue until the 20th century.

== Architecture, urban planning and sculpture ==
The first Renaissance endeavor in Urbino was the portal of the church of San Domenico, created in 1449 in a manner similar to a Roman triumphal arch by Maso di Bartolomeo, called to the city through the intercession of Fra Carnevale, an Urbino painter sent perhaps by Federico himself to the workshop of Filippo Lippi, one of the three most famous Florentine painters of the time (along with Beato Angelico and Domenico Veneziano). Maso was a Florentine architect, sculptor, and goldsmith who had already trained in the workshop of Donatello and Michelozzo, with whom he had worked on the Cathedral of Prato.

=== Ducal Palace and the city ===
[Federico] built a palace, according to the opinion of many, the most beautiful to be found in all Italy; and with every opportunity he furnished it so well, that it seemed to be not a palace, but a city in the form of a palace.

— Baldassarre Castiglione, Il Cortegiano, I, 2

Federico da Montefeltro's most ambitious project was the construction of the Ducal Palace and, at the same time, the urban planning of Urbino, making it the city "of the prince."

Before Federico's interventions, Urbino was a town perched on two contiguous hills, with an elongated and irregular shape surrounded by a ring of walls. The main road axis cut through the city along the lower part between the two hills, leading on one side to the sea and on the other to the Apennine passes to Perugia and Lazio. The ducal residence was a simple palace on the southern hill, to which was added a nearby castellany, on the edge of the cliff towards the Porta Valbona.

==== The first phase: Maso di Bartolomeo ====
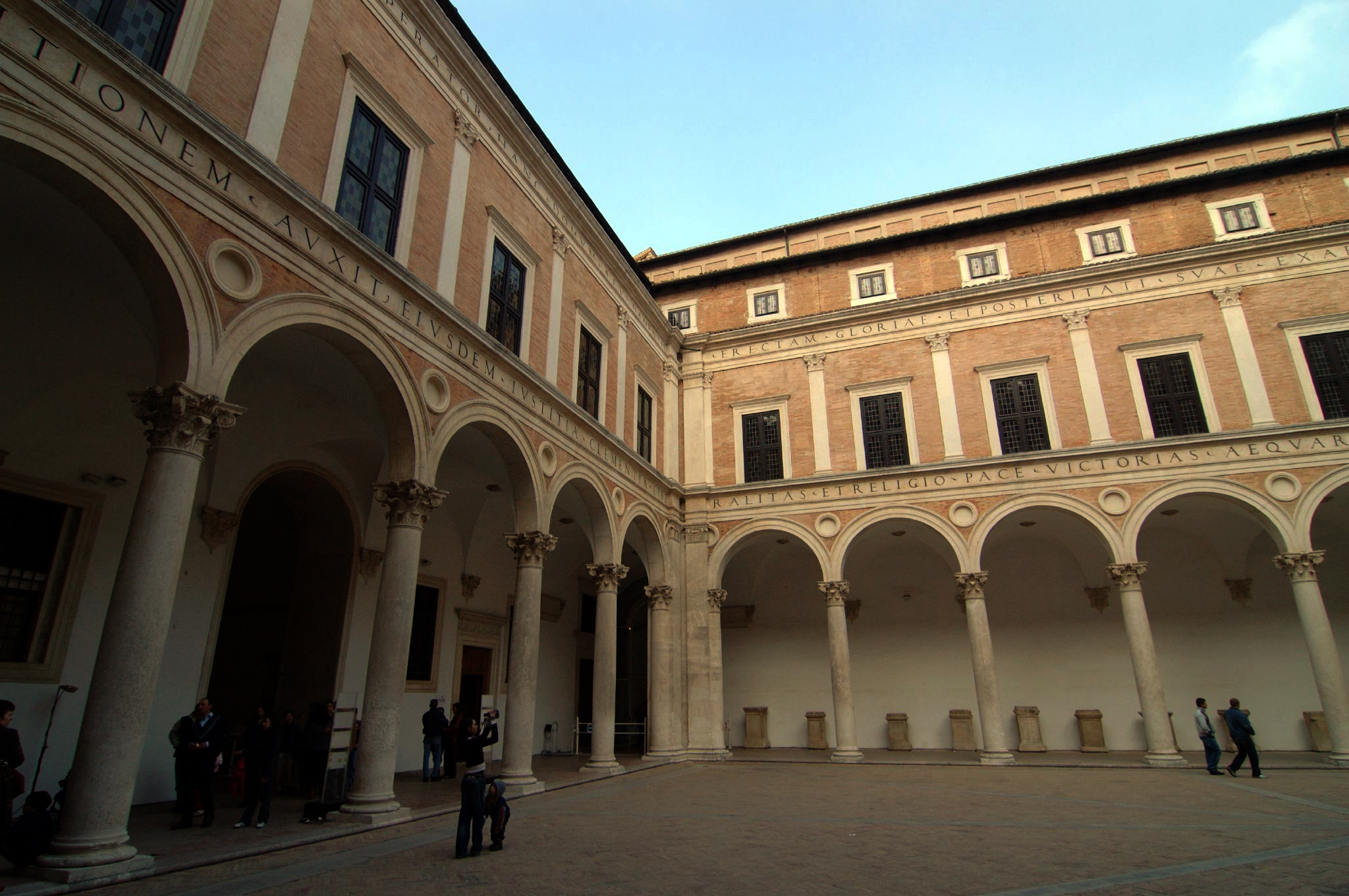
The courtyard

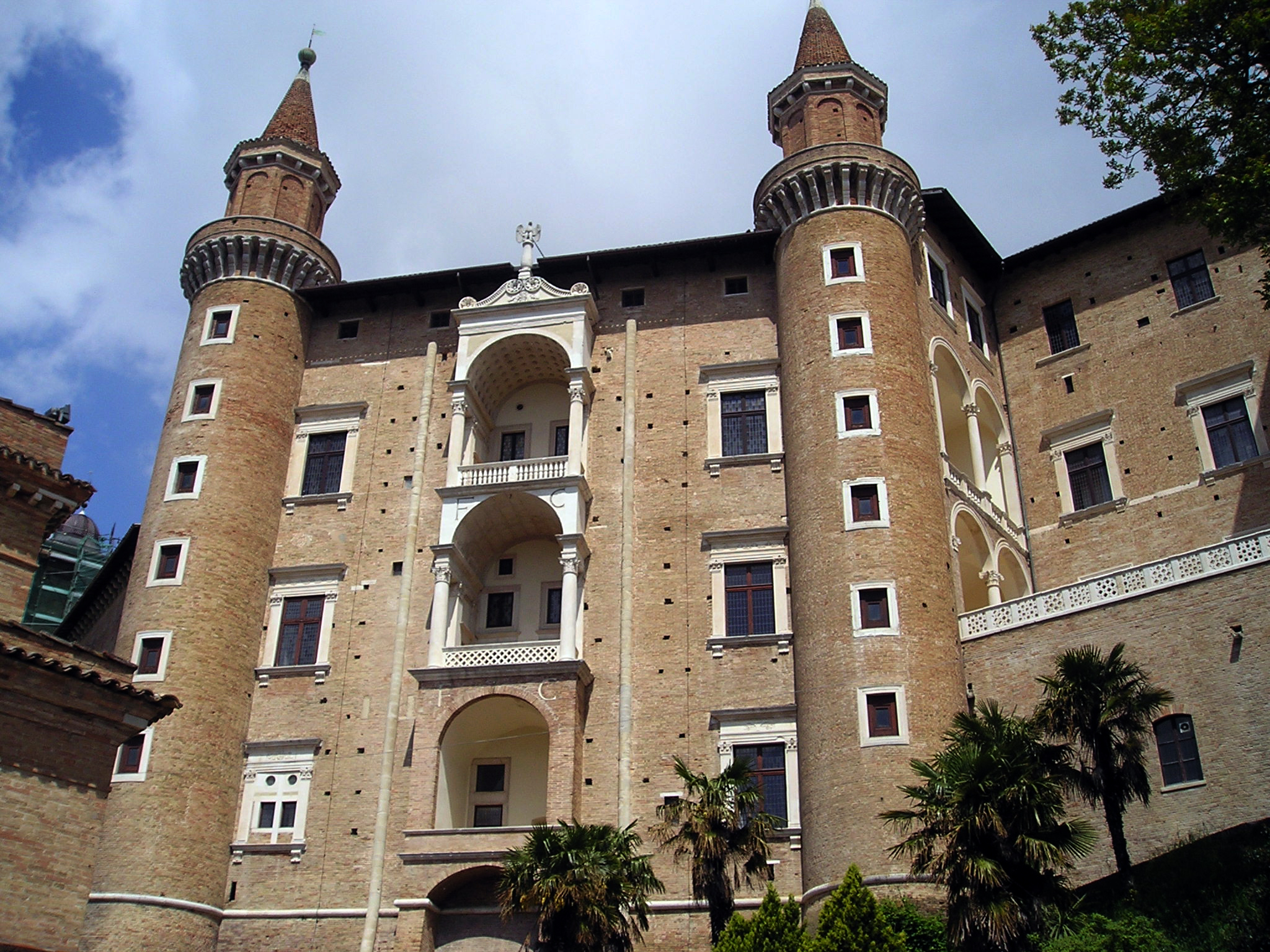
Façade of the Torricini

In about 1445 Federico first had the two ancient ducal buildings joined, calling in Florentine architects (headed by Maso di Bartolomeo) to build an intermediate palace. The result was the three-story Palazzetto della Jole, in a simple and typically Tuscan austere style. The interior was decorated with some sober antiquarian accents in the furnishings, as in the friezes and fireplaces, centered on the celebration of Hercules and the virtues of war.

==== The second phase: Luciano Laurana ====
In the 60s the design of the palace was changed, to make it also an administrative headquarters and a place to host illustrious figures. From about 1466 the work in fact passed to a new architect, Dalmatian Luciano Laurana. The centerpiece of the new arrangement was the vast porticoed courtyard, which connected the previous buildings. The courtyard has harmonious, classical forms, with a portico with round arches, oculi, and Corinthian columns on the ground floor, while the main floor is punctuated by lesenes and architraved windows. Along the first two string courses run inscriptions in Roman capital letters, which are of classical epigraphic character, as are the capitals, precisely copied from Flavian specimens.

From this core the palace was later expanded toward the city and in the opposite direction. The facade toward the city had an "open book" (L-shaped) form on Piazzale Duca Federico, which was specially arranged by Francesco di Giorgio Martini and later closed on the north side by the side of the cathedral. The palace thus became the centerpiece of the urban fabric without being disruptive and subduing, with its presence, even the nearby religious authority.

The front overlooking Valbona was, on the other hand, completed with the so-called "facade of the Torricini," slightly rotated westward with respect to the orthogonal axes of the palace. It owes its name to the two towers flanking the tall and narrow facade, yet softened in the center by the ascending rhythm of three superimposed loggias, each repeating the pattern of the triumphal arch. The façade of the Torricini does not look toward the built-up area but outward, so greater stylistic freedom was possible, without having to worry about integration with earlier buildings; moreover, its imposing presence is clearly visible even from afar, as a symbol of ducal prestige.

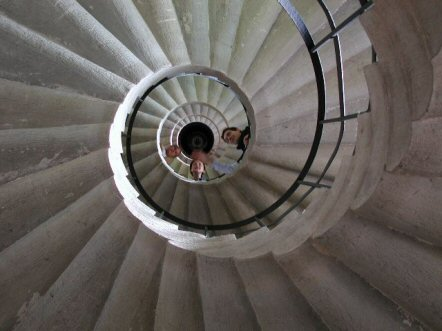
The helical ramp, seen from below

==== The third phase: Francesco di Giorgio ====
In 1472 Francesco di Giorgio Martini took over the direction of the work, completing the L-shaped facade, taking care of the private spaces, the loggias, the hanging garden and the second floor of the courtyard, as well as the connection with the underlying structures outside the walls. At the foot of the cliff was a large clearing, known as the "Mercatale" because it was the site of a market, where Francesco di Giorgio created the helicoidal ramp, which allowed wagons and horses to reach the palace and the "Data," that is, the large stables located at mid-height.

In the interior spaces overseen by Francesco di Giorgio, a change in style can be seen, marked by a more sumptuous and abstract decoration. In spite of these differences, the palace succeeded in the almost miraculous attempt to combine the various parts with balance in an asymmetrical complex, conditioned by the irregularities of the terrain and the pre-existing buildings, in which the rigor of the individual parts balances the lack of a unified design.

=== San Bernardino ===
Outside the palace, it was Francesco di Giorgio Martini who investigated some of the problems derived from the considerations of the court. One example is the church of San Bernardino, erected between about 1482 and 1491 by testamentary disposition of the duke, who intended to be buried there. The architect used a Latin-cross plan with a single, barrel-vaulted nave that grafts onto the rectangular-based presbytery (slightly flatter on the transept side, otherwise resembling a square altogether), where three semicircular apses originally opened (the one behind the high altar was later torn down and replaced by a rectangular barrel-vaulted niche). The effect was that of the tripartite cell, of late antique inspiration, realized, however, with a spatial sharpness typical of Urbino culture. The exterior is almost bare, with brick facing enlivened only by the string-course cornices, windows and portal. The interior, on the other hand, is characterized by the almost bare masonry backgrounds, articulated by the solids and voids of the volumes and with a few details of refined preciousness, such as the gray moldings on the structural joints (of Brunelleschian inspiration), or the columns on high plinths that support the dome and make its weight discharge to the ground visible. The inscription in Roman capital letters runs around the entire perimeter and closely resembles that of the courtyard of honor in the Ducal Palace.

=== Military fortresses ===
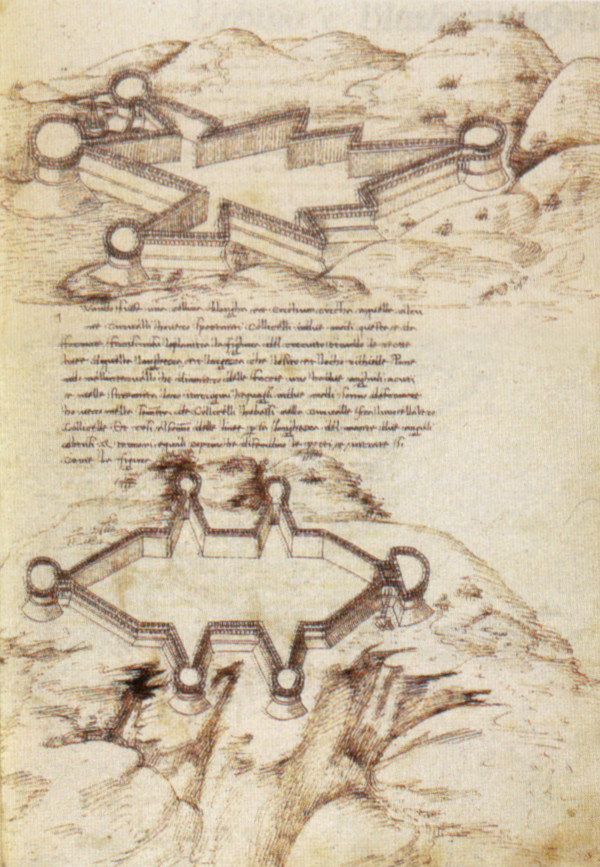
Francesco di Giorgio Martini, Treatise on architecture, drawing of fortresses (second half 15th century), BNCF Cod magliabechiano II, I. 141, f.58 r, Florence

While in Urbino Francesco di Giorgio Martini also wrote the Treatise on Architecture, Engineering and Military Art, in which the various architectural types were considered with extensive use of illustrations created by the artist himself. The study of monuments and basic texts of ancient architecture was being actualized with a more elastic attitude, open to concrete solutions to problems and experimentalism. In practice this attitude was seen in the creation of numerous military fortresses commissioned by Federico for the defense of the Duchy. Although many of those buildings have been destroyed or heavily modified, San Leo, Mondavio and Sassocorvaro remain virtually intact, bearing witness to how offensive and defensive functions are specifically integrated with the orography of the sites, through often ingenious empirical intuitions that set aside the complex geometric or zoomorphic plans depicted in the Treatise. Fortresses are often composed as loose aggregations of elemental solids (such as cylindrical towers), ideal for passive projectile defense. Few and subtly refined are the formal decorations, such as the string-course cornices that elastically wrap around the perimeters or the infilled corbels that support the walkways and enliven the smooth curtain walls.

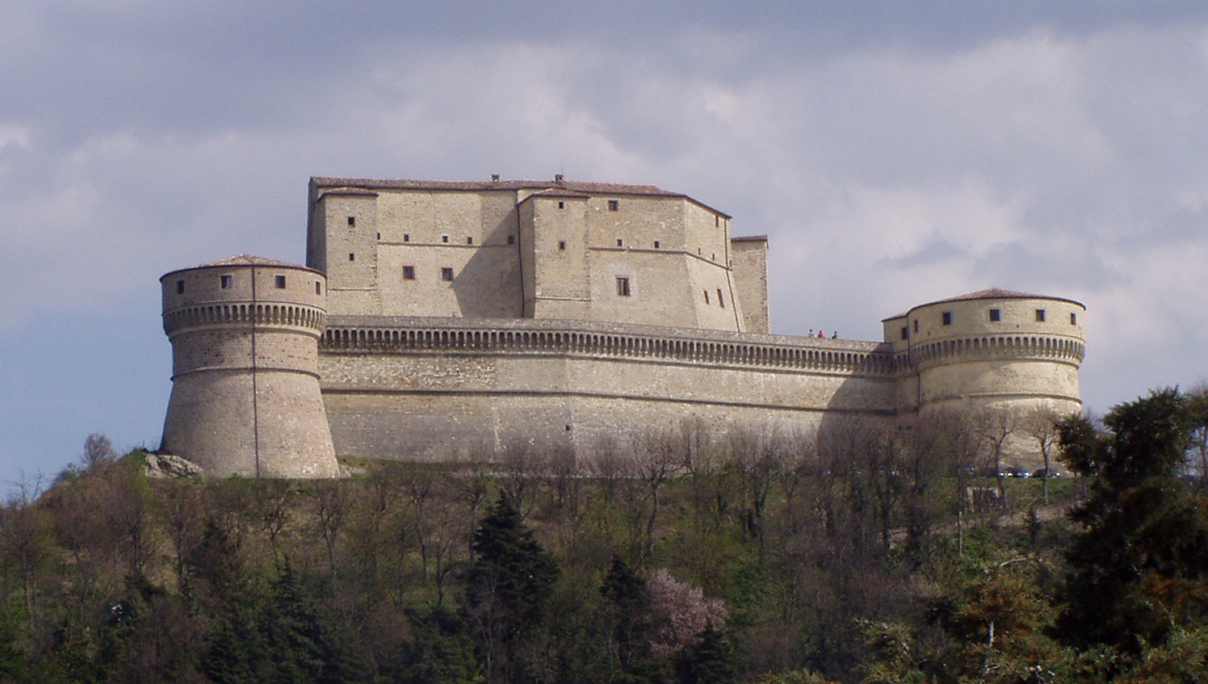
San Leo

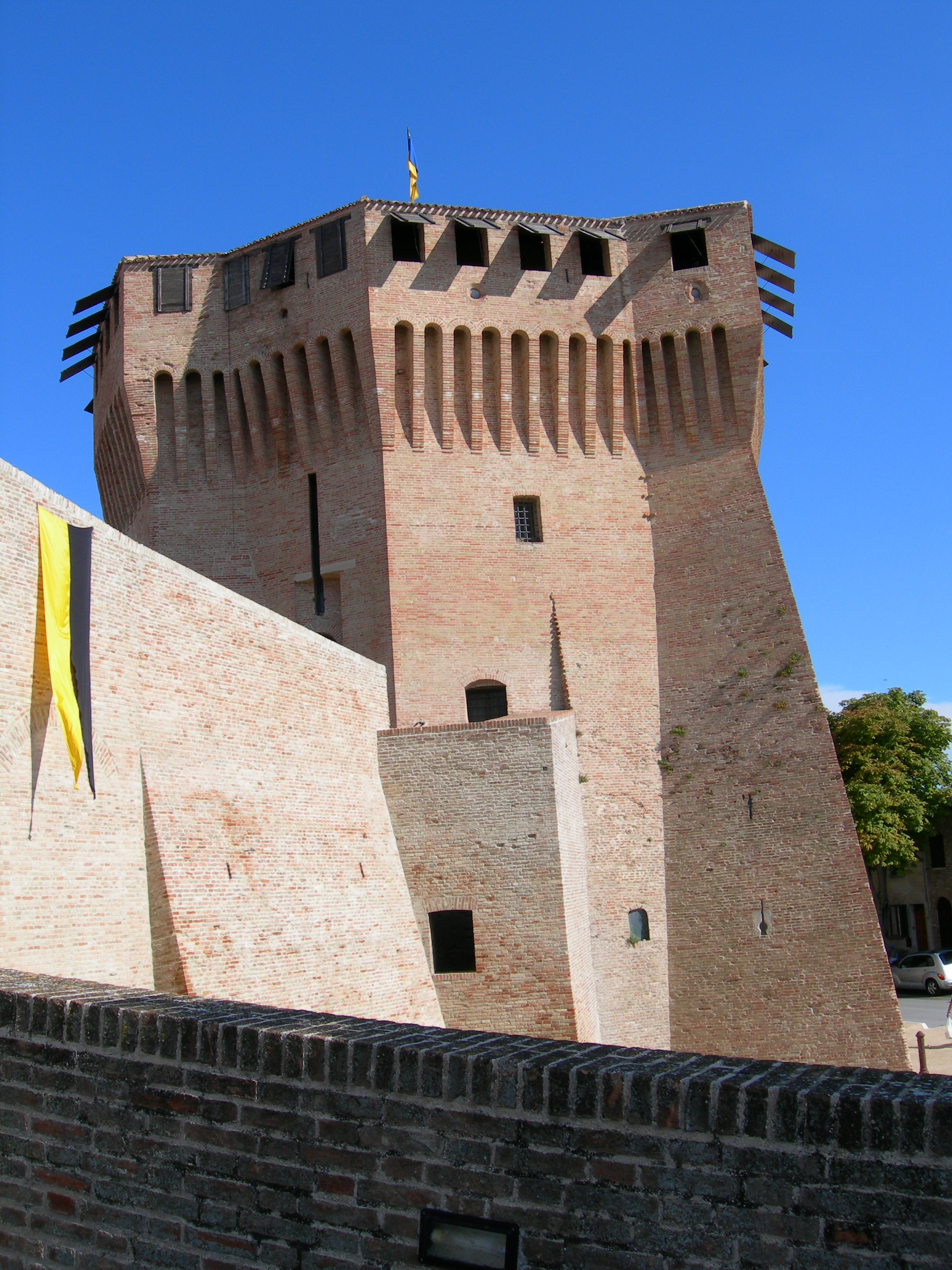
Mondavio

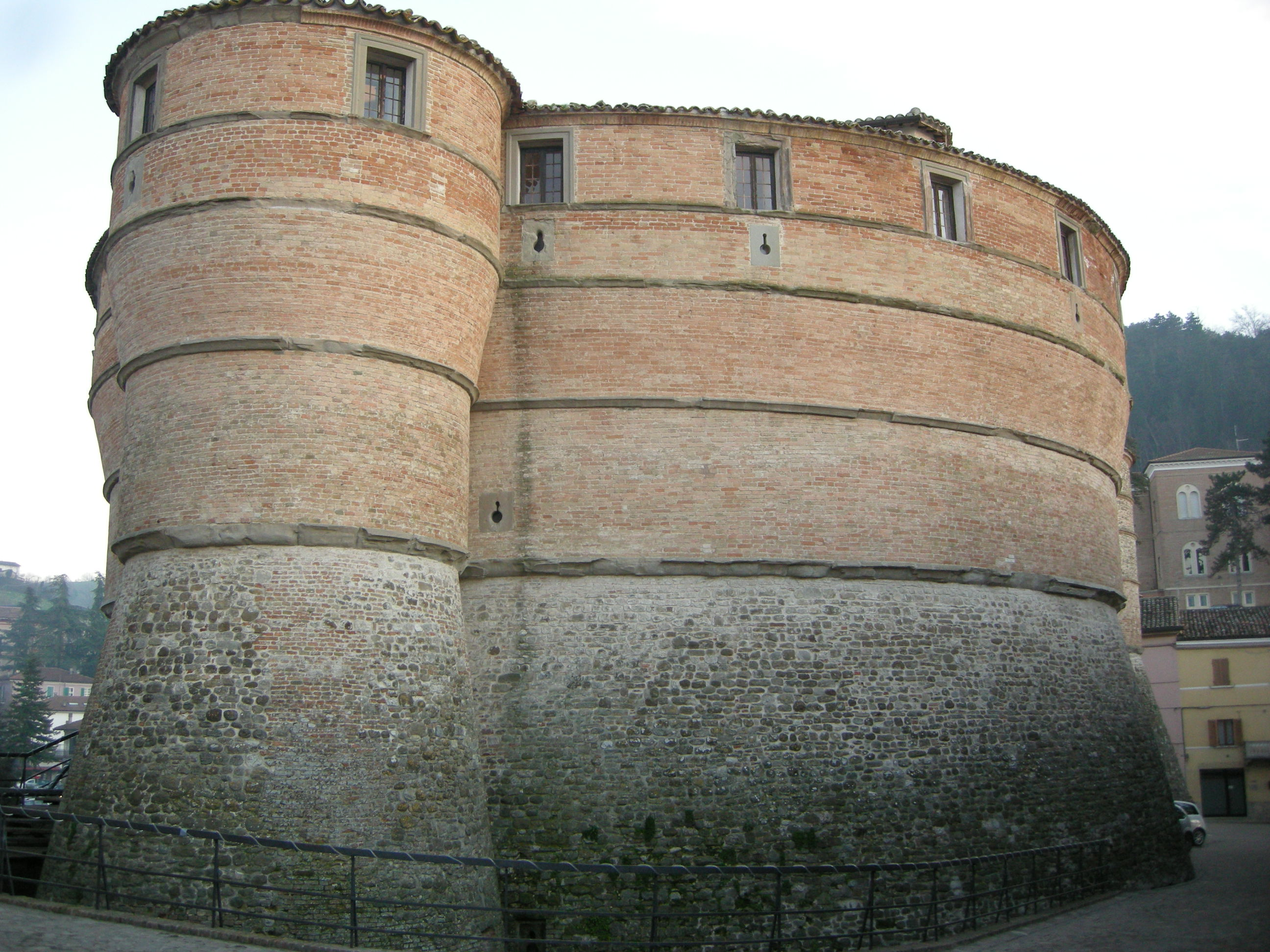
Sassocorvaro

== Painting and marquetry ==
The local school of painting was initially dominated by Fra Carnevale, a pupil of Filippo Lippi, and various passing masters, including Paolo Uccello, who lived in Urbino between 1467 and 1468 to paint the Communion of the Apostles. According to Vasari, however, Piero della Francesca was also present in the city from the time of Guidantonio da Montefeltro, whose first documentary traces in the city date back to 1469.

=== Piero della Francesca ===
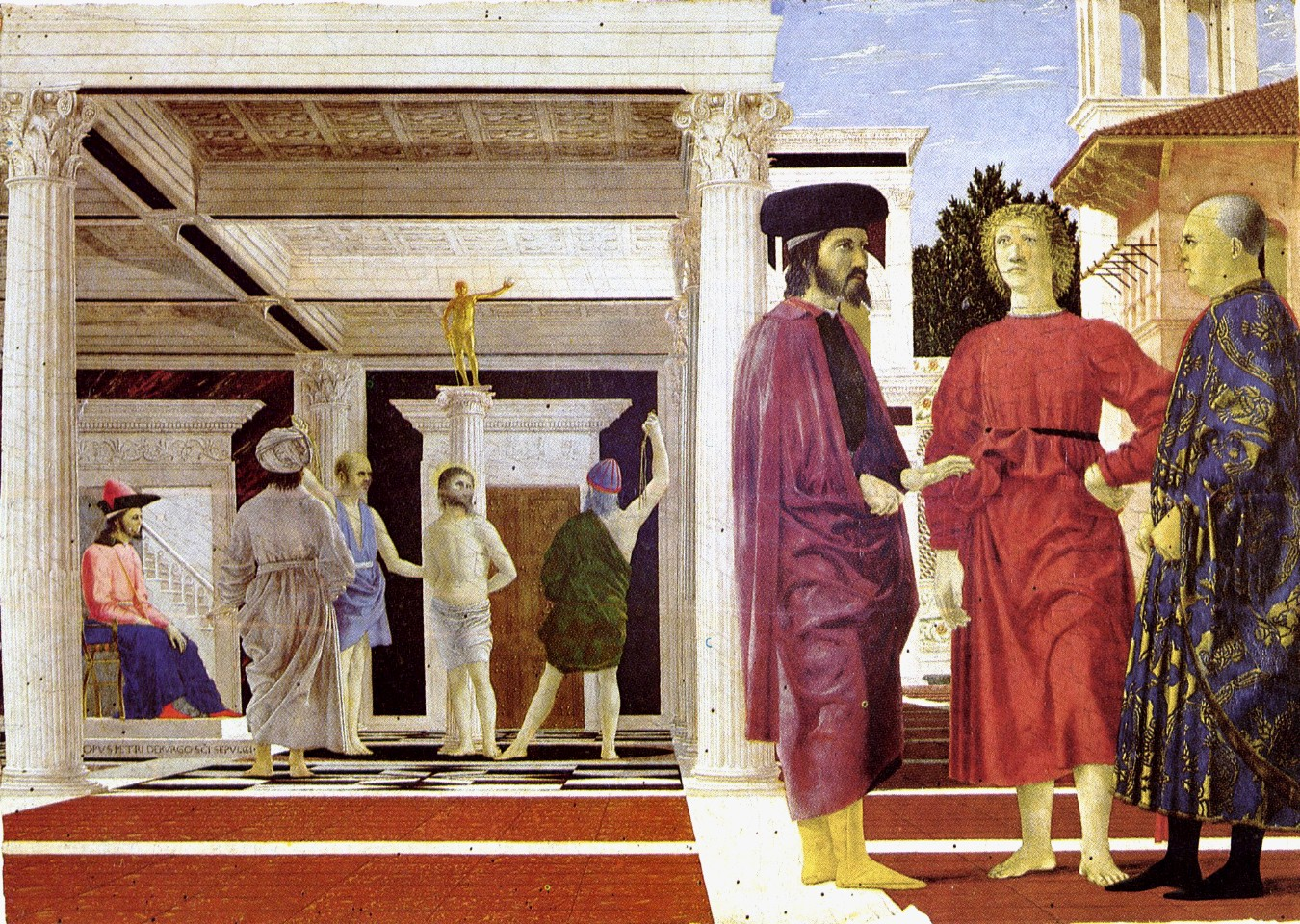
The Flagellation

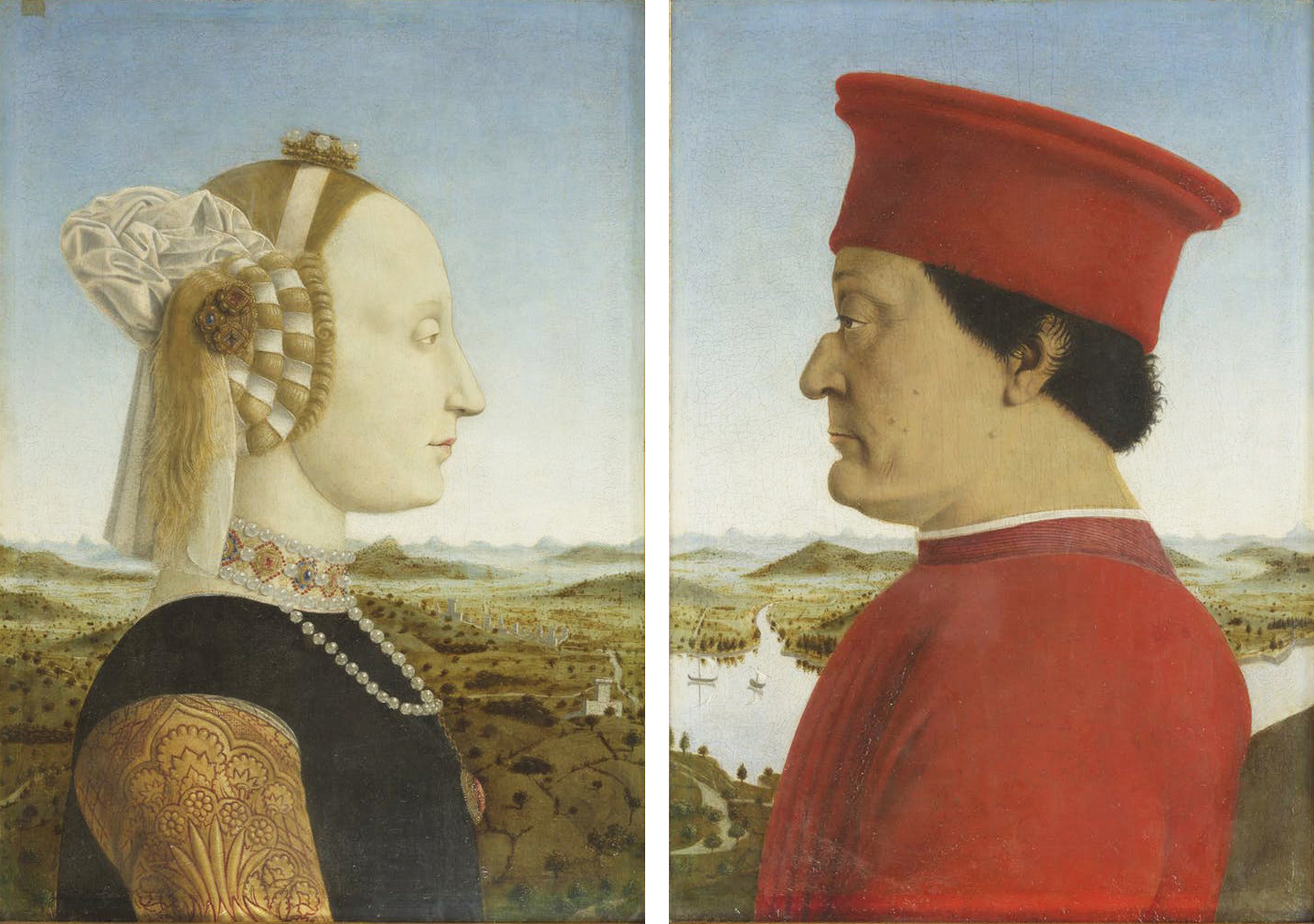
Diptych of Federico da Montefeltro and Battista Sforza

Piero della Francesca is rightly considered one of the protagonists and promoters of Urbino culture, although he was neither a native of the Marche region by birth or training, but rather a Tuscan. Nevertheless, it was precisely in Urbino that his style achieved an unsurpassed balance between the use of strict geometric rules and the serenely monumental scope of his paintings. His relationship with Federico da Montefeltro's court is not fully elucidated, especially with regard to the frequency and duration of his sojourns, in the context of a life full of poorly documented movements. At least one sojourn in Urbino between 1469 and 1472 is considered plausible, where he brought his style already delineated in its fundamental traits from his earliest artistic efforts and summarized in the perspective organization of the paintings, the geometric simplification that invests the compositions and even individual figures, the balance between ceremonial stillness and investigation of human truth, and the use of a very clear light that lightens the shadows and permeates the colors.

One of the earliest works linked to the Urbino patronage is the Flagellation, an emblematic work with multiple levels of interpretation that continues to fascinate researches and studies. The panel is divided into two sections proportioned by the golden ratio: on the right, in the open, are three figures in the foreground, while on the left, under a loggia, the scene of the actual flagellation of Christ unfolds more in the distance. The very precise perspective framing coordinates the two groups, seemingly unrelated to each other, while the hues match and enhance each other in the clear light, which comes from different sources. The arcane stillness of the characters is heightened by unusual elements of iconography, in which theological issues and facts of current events are mixed.

In the double Portrait of the Dukes of Urbino (c. 1465) one can already see an influence of Flemish painting, in the blurred landscapes in extremely distant depths and the attention to detail in the immediately nearby effigies of the dukes. The study of light is notable (cold and lunar for Battista Sforza, warm for Federico), unified by a strong formal rigor, a full sense of volume, and certain contrivances, such as the red frame that is redder than Federico's clothes, that isolate the portraits by making them loom over the viewer.

In the Madonna of Senigallia (c. 1470), set in a compartment of the Ducal Palace, Piero admirably fuses a clear and simplified composition with the use of light in a poetic manner. Here, too, one catches references to the Flemish, such as the small room in the background where a window opens and a ray of sunlight filters through, lighting reflections in the hair of the angel in front.

However, the research into the harmony between spatial rigor and luminous truth had its best outcome in the Brera Altarpiece (1472), formerly in San Bernardino, where Federico da Montefeltro is portrayed kneeling as the patron. Figures and architectural setting are closely linked, and in fact the figures are arranged in a semicircle occupying the space of the apse in which the scene is set. The pigments used are not many, but the use of different binders allows for different effects while maintaining tuned hues. The space is deep and light is its abstract and motionless protagonist, defining forms and materials in the most diverse effects: from the dark opacity of the saints' humble cloths to the reflections of Federico's shiny armor.

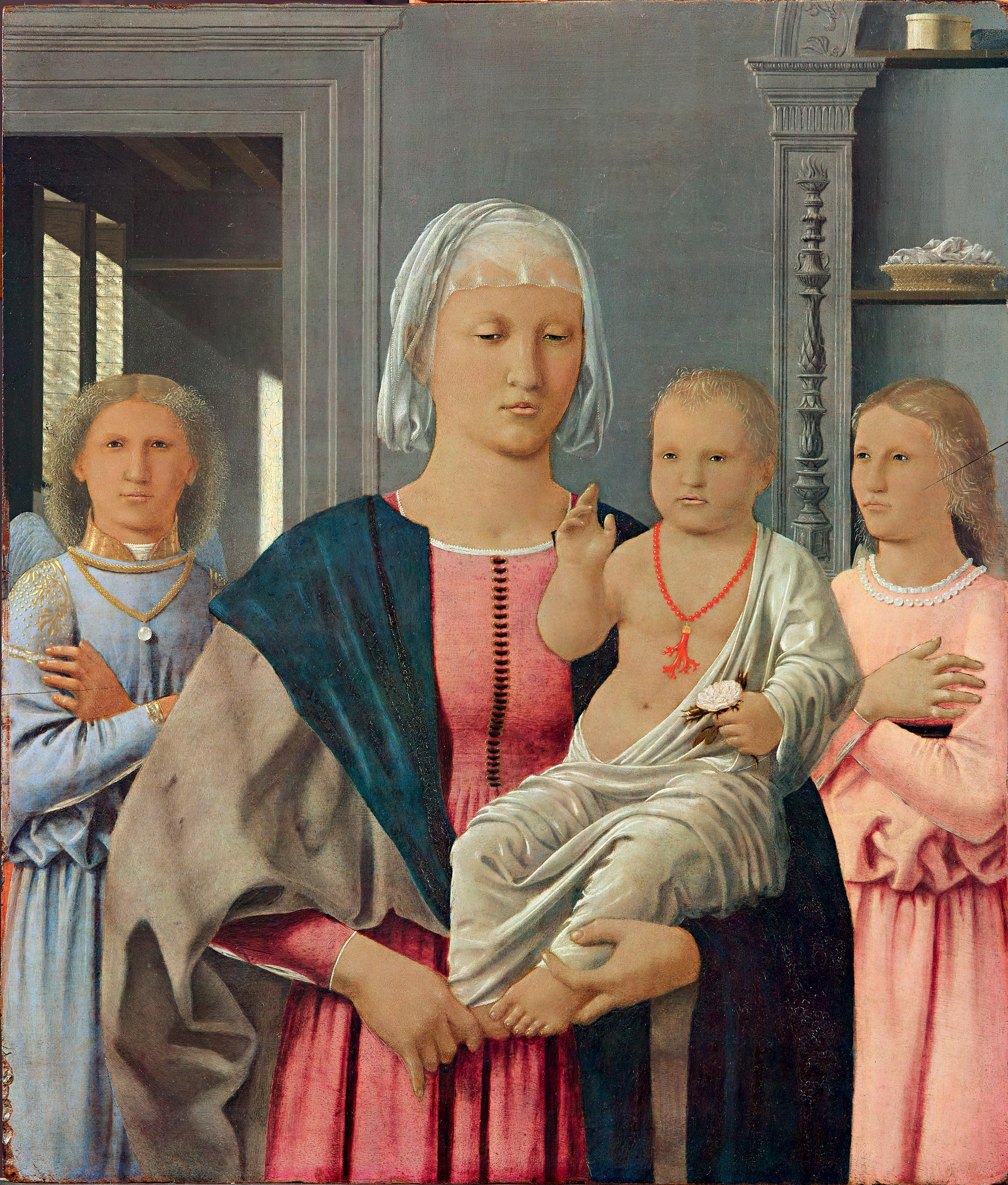
Madonna di Senigallia

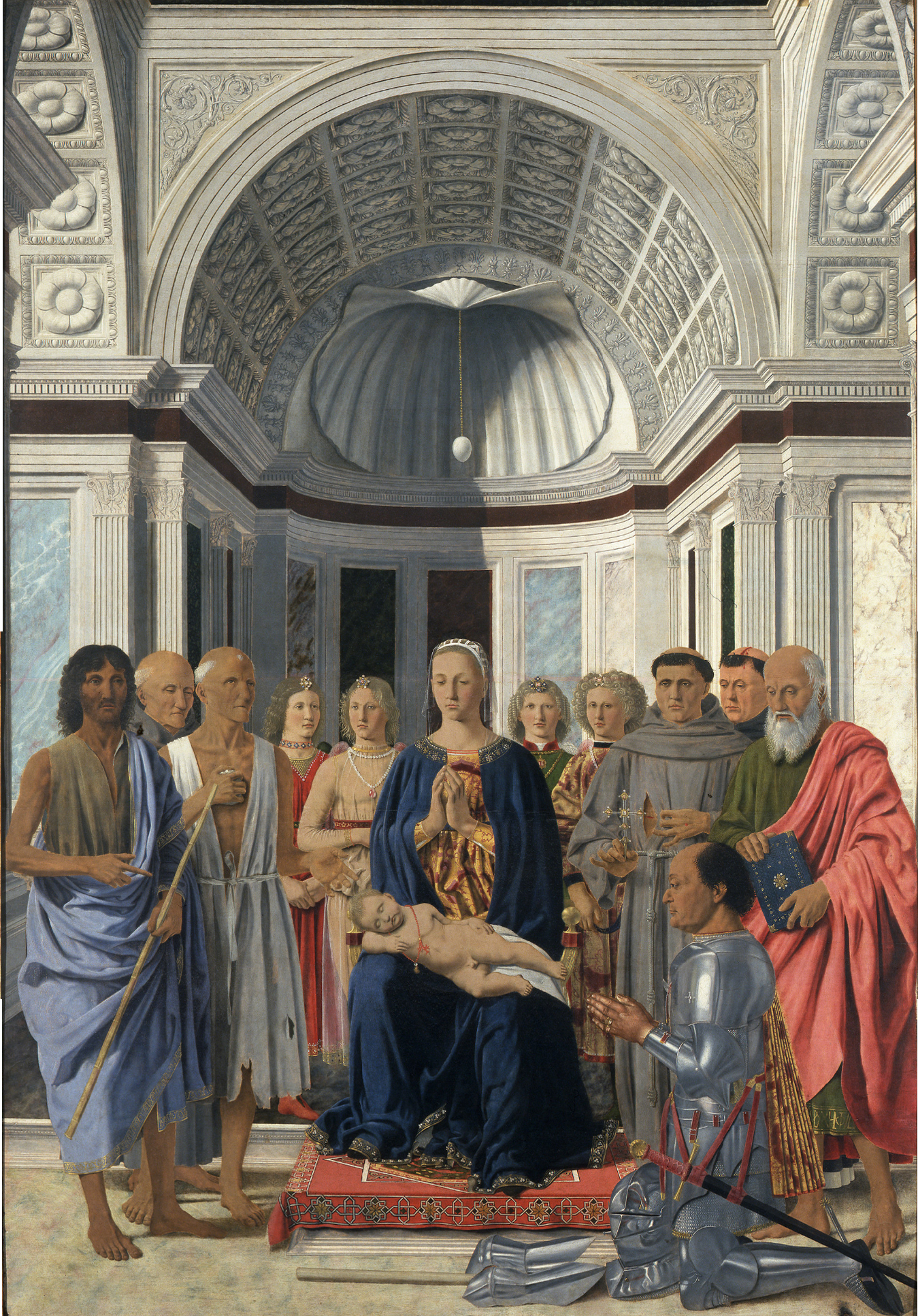
Brera Madonna

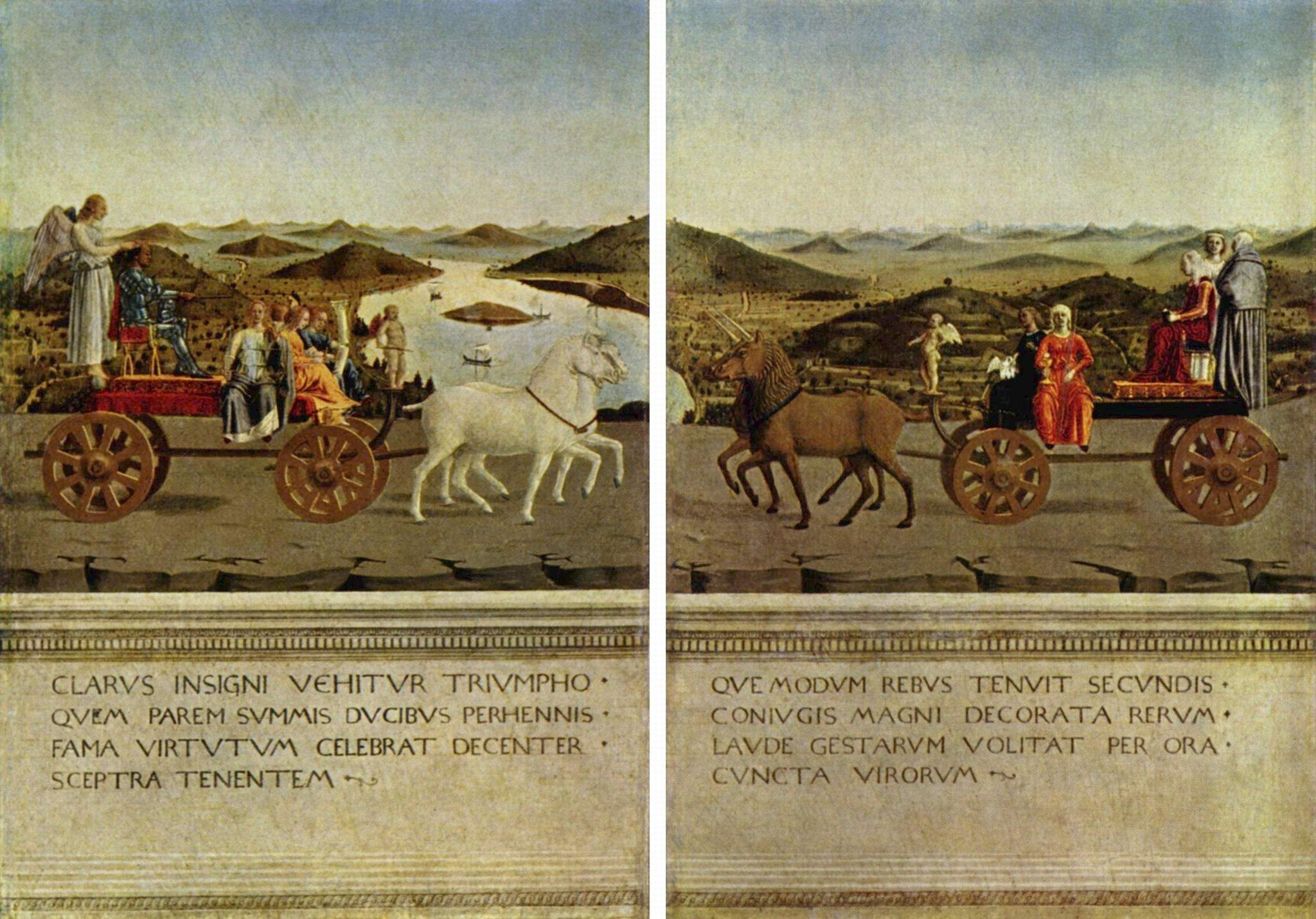
Triumphs of the Dukes of Urbino, back of the double portrait

=== The Study and the Library ===
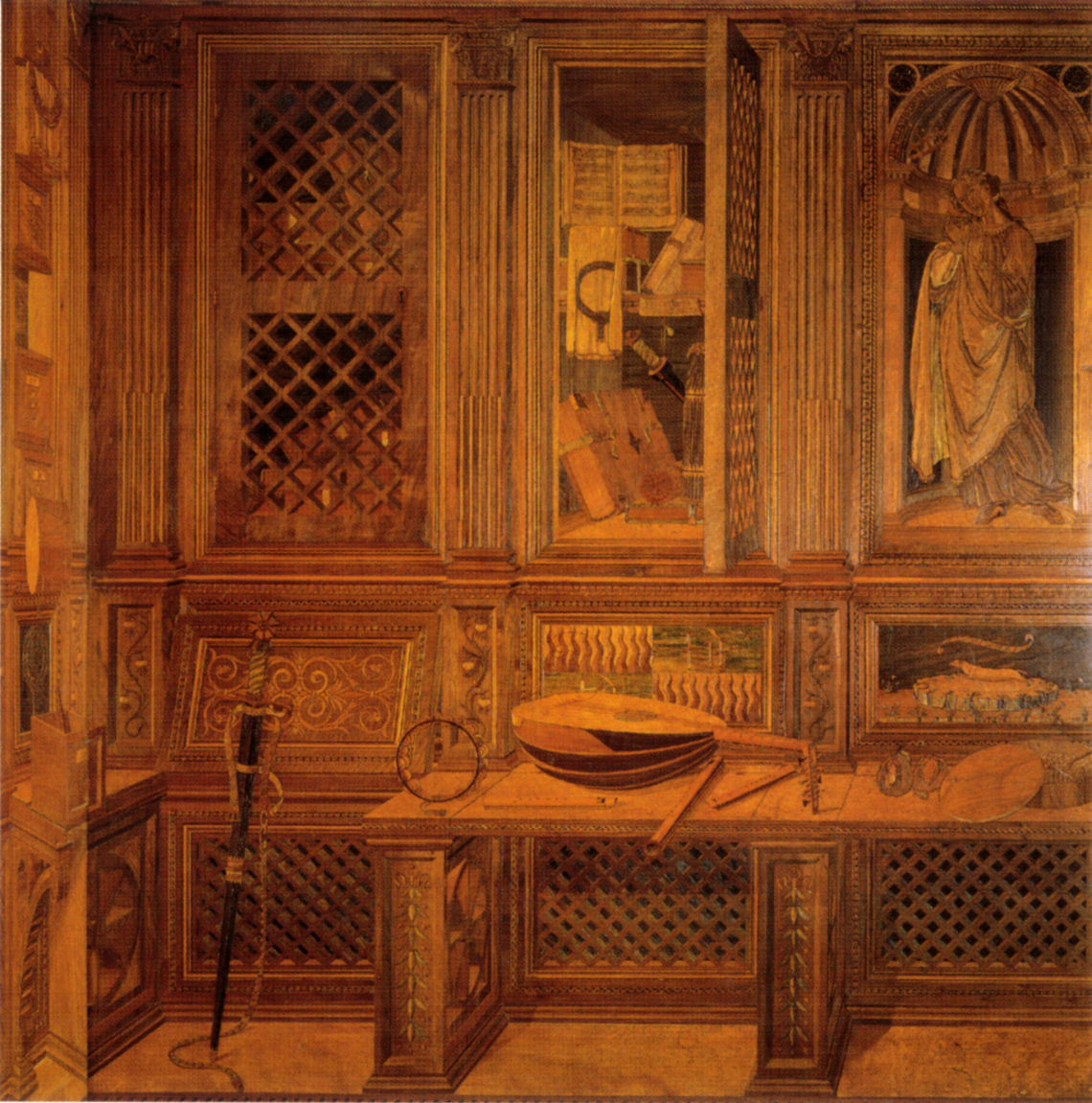
Benedetto, Giuliano da Maiano and workshop, inlays of the Study

The Study of Federico da Montefeltro (1473–1476) is practically the only one of the interior rooms of the Ducal Palace that has largely preserved its original decoration. It features sumptuous ornamentation, with continuous cross-references between the royal architecture and the illusionistic architecture depicted in the famous wooden inlays (the work of Baccio Pontelli, Giuliano da Maiano and other artists for the designs) and paintings once preserved there.

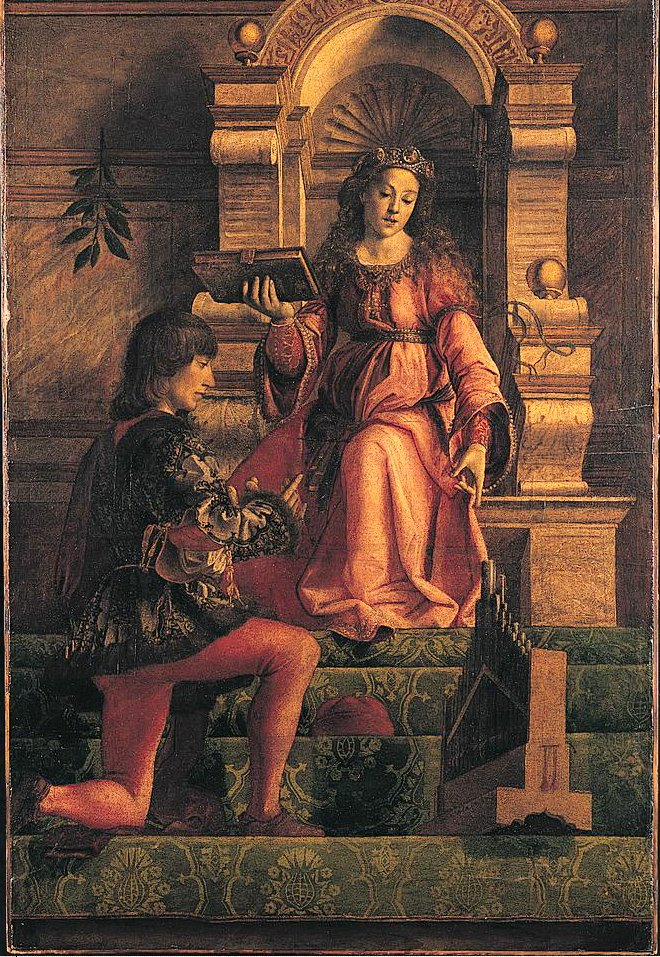
Master of the Liberal Arts, Music, National Gallery, London (from Federico's Library)

Originally the upper part was decorated by a frieze with twenty-eight portraits of illustrious men of the past and present, arranged on two registers, the work of Justus van Gent and Pedro Berruguete, and today divided between the Louvre Museum and the National Gallery of the Marches (which keeps them in another room).

The portraits, which included both civic and ecclesiastical, Christian and pagan figures, were intensified by a slightly lowered point of view and the unified background, which through perspective created the effect of a royal gallery.

The dazzling colors and continuous cross-references between real and fantastic architecture were meant to create in the viewer an effect of great wonder. The tarsias are attributed to various authors, such as Giuliano da Maiano and, for the drawings, Botticelli, Francesco di Giorgio Martini, and the young Donato Bramante. The inlays of Baccio Pontelli, a specialist in complex perspective constructions of geometric objects, which created a continuous exchange between reality and fiction, dilating the space of the otherwise tiny room, stand out.

The objects portrayed alluded to the symbols of the Arts, but also to the Virtues (the mace of Fortitude, the sword of Justice, etc.), as if the exercise of the former paved the way for the Virtues themselves. A portrait of Federico personified and clarified the allegory of the whole, which exalted the Duke as the protagonist of the virtuous parable of the ethical and intellectual meanings of the decoration, which advocated the theme of pensive solitude, ethics and contemplation as the nourishment of action.

The natural offshoot of the Study was the Library of Federico da Montefeltro, now housed in the Vatican Library, where there was a series of paintings on the walls featuring the Liberal Arts, symbolized by female figures on thrones, which were composed strongly foreshortened from below, at the apex of steps in a space that continued ideally from one painting to the next. The Arts were portrayed in the act of handing over their insignia to Federico and other court figures, investing them as ideal vassals.

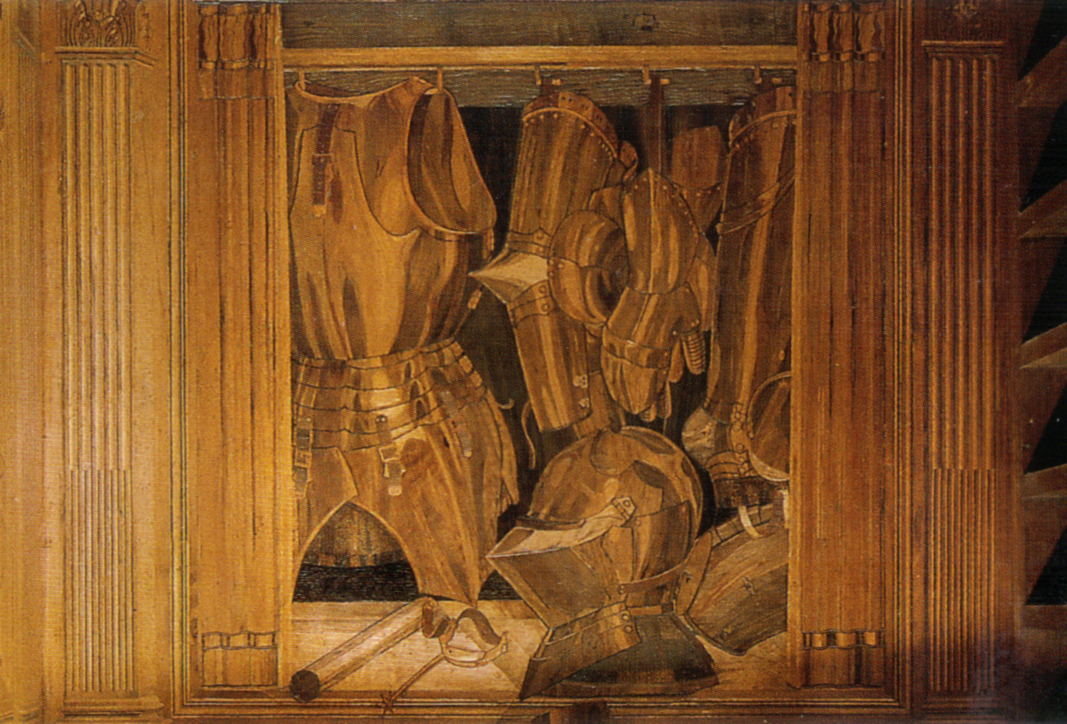
Baccio Pontelli, inlay with the Duke's Armour

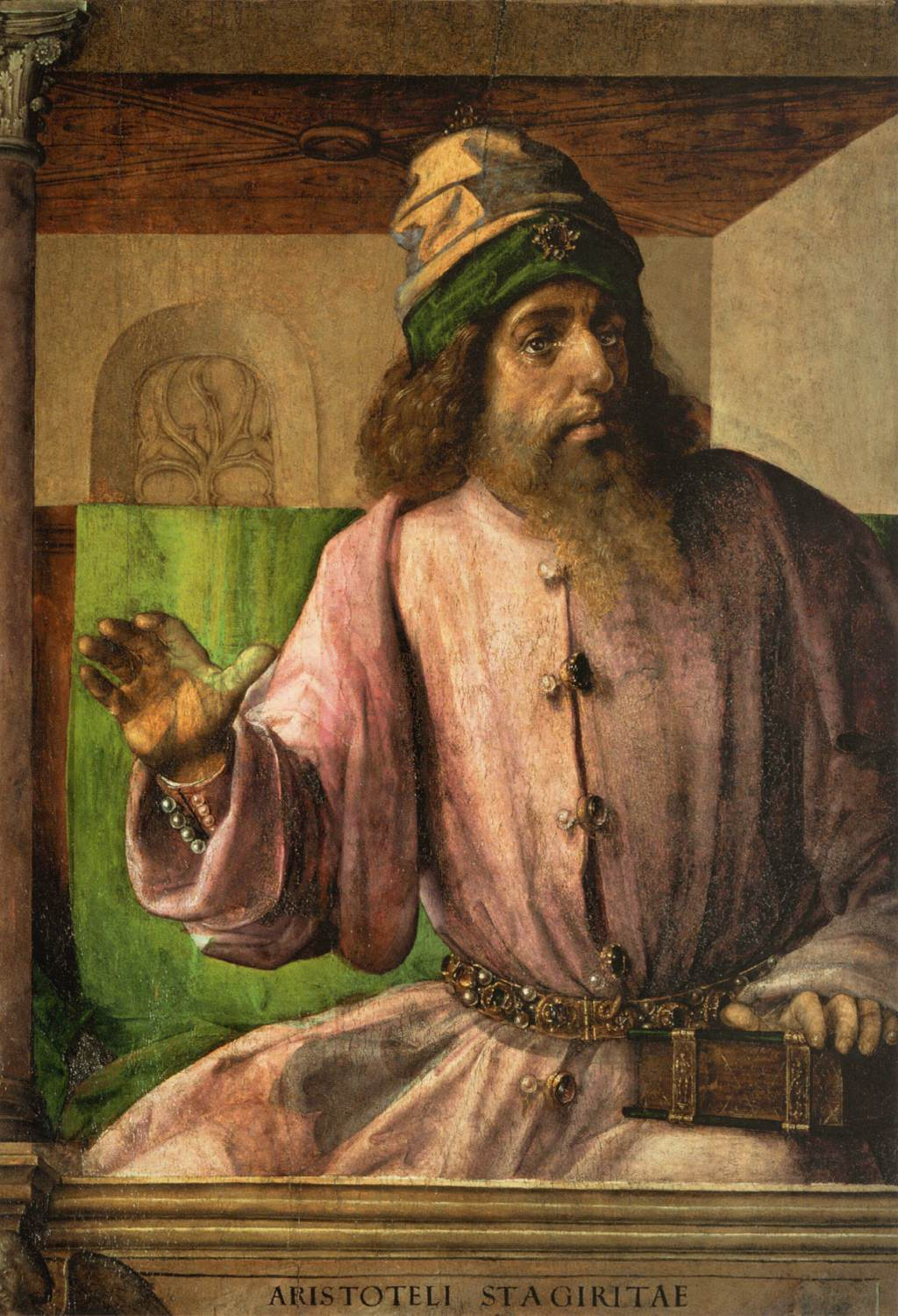
Justus van Gent, Aristotle

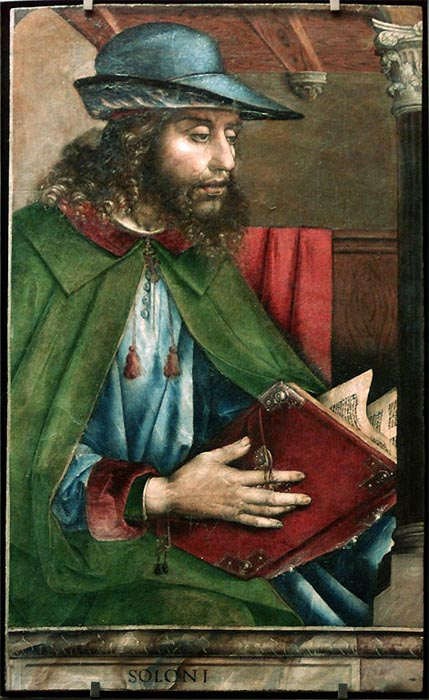
Justus van Gent and Pedro Berruguete, Solon, Louvre

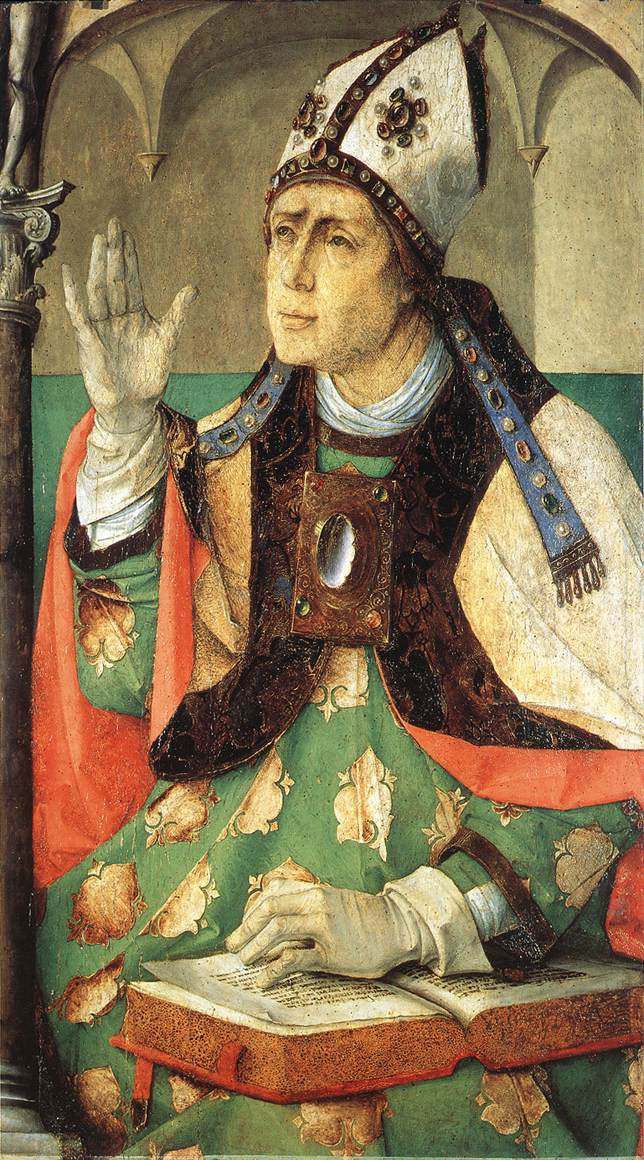
Justus van Gent, Saint Augustine, Louvre

== Legacy and influence ==
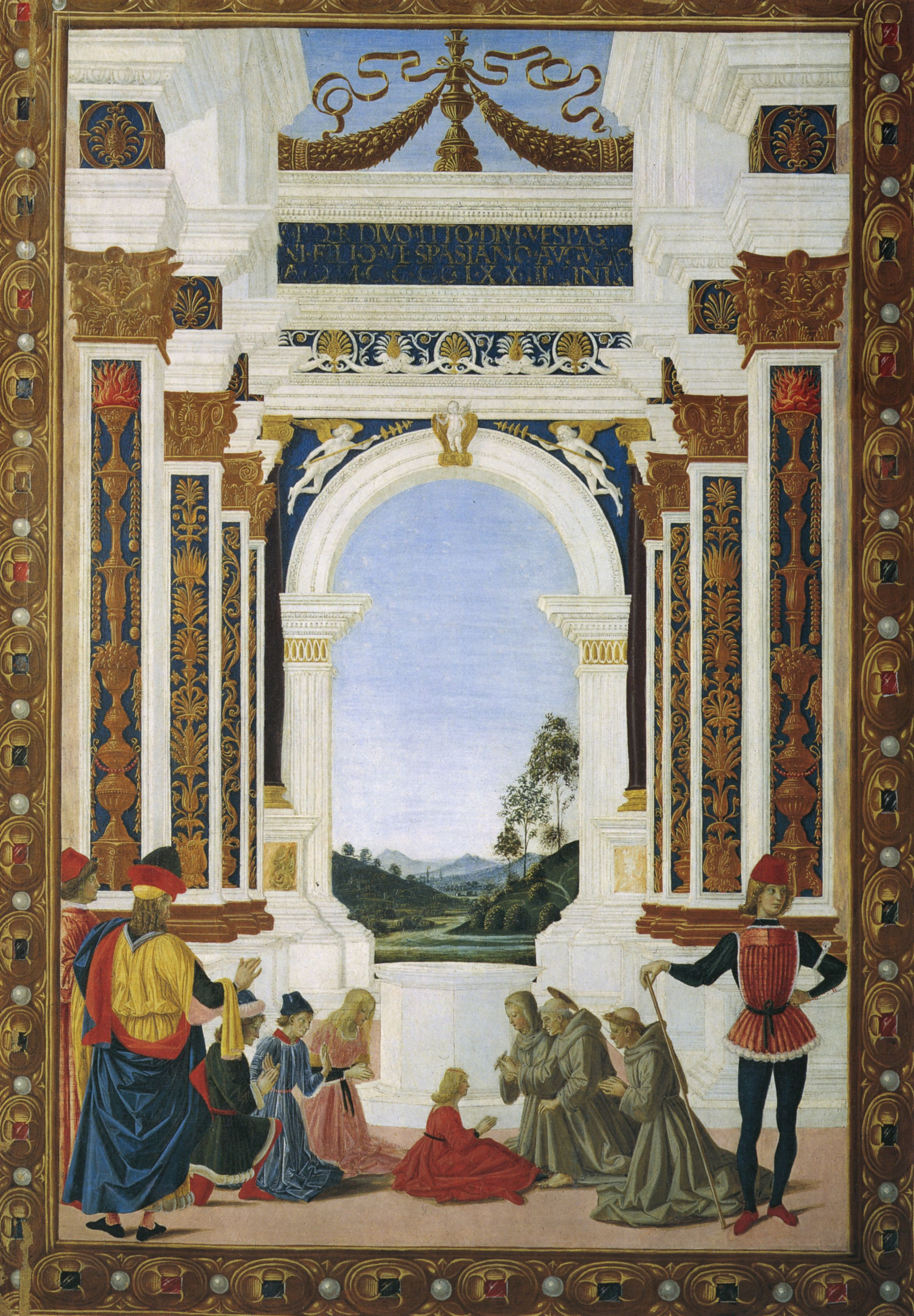
Pietro Perugino, Saint Bernardine Healing a Girl (1473), National Gallery of Umbria, Perugia

The rarefied and extremely refined climate of Federico's court essentially involved the palace, and it was limited to it, not fostering the development of a true local school. At the duke's death artistic activities came to an undeniable halt, but with the return home of the foreign artists who had come to the court there was a very wide diffusion of the Urbino style, with fruitful developments. The most obvious examples concern the developments of the relationship between real and painted architecture, inaugurated by Piero della Francesca and the makers of the inlays of the Study, which was picked up by Melozzo da Forlì, who exported it to Rome, and by the nascent Perugia school, especially in the beginnings of Pietro Vannucci.

However, the climate born in the Montefeltro seignory remained a pillar in the local figurative culture, influencing the formation of two of the main interpreters of the full Renaissance, who originated precisely in Urbino: Raphael and Bramante.

== The 16th century ==
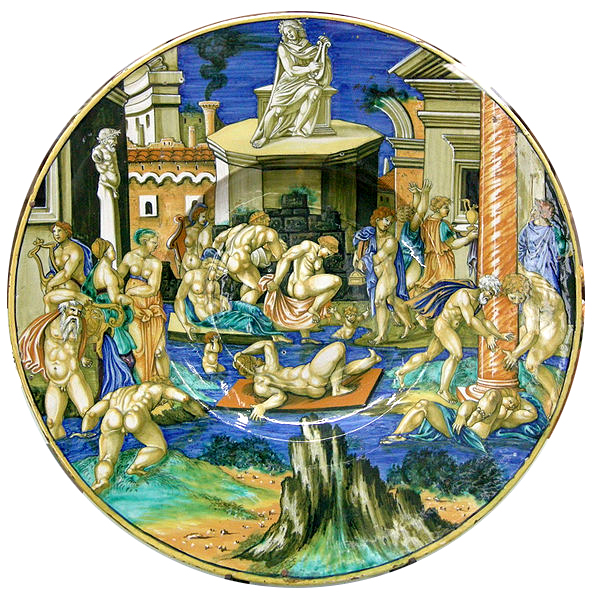
Francesco Xanto Avelli, Plate with the flood of the Tiber, 1531

With the extinction of the Montefeltros Urbino remained a brilliant Renaissance court, although no longer at the forefront of the avant-garde, thanks to the Della Rovere family. The court, endowed with great elegance and taste, was a patron of Titian, who painted, for example, the famous Venus of Urbino there. In the first decades of the sixteenth century, the production of the famous historiated ceramics reached its peak, with artists such as Francesco Xanto Avelli and Niccolò Pellipario, known as Nicola da Urbino, followed in the second half of the century by the flourishing workshops of the Fontana and Patanazzi families. During that period the city became a center at the forefront of Counter-Reformation painting production, thanks to Federico Barocci.

== See also ==
- Renaissance art
- Urbino
- Ideal city

== Bibliography ==
- De Vecchi, Pierluigi; Cerchiari, Elda (1999). I tempi dell'arte. Vol. 2. Milano: Bompiani. ISBN 88-451-7212-0.
- Zuffi, Stefano (2004). Il Quattrocento. Milano: Electa. ISBN 88-370-2315-4.
- Zuffi, Stefano (2005). Il Cinquecento. Milano: Electa. ISBN 88-370-3468-7.
- Blasio, Silvia, ed. (2007). Marche e Toscana, terre di grandi maestri tra Quattro e Seicento. Firenze: Pacini Editore per Banca Toscana.
- Tommasoli, Walter (1995) [1975]. La vita di Federico da Montefeltro 1422–1482. Urbino: Argalia.
