= Guidobaldo =

Guidobaldo is a given name. Notable people with the name include:

- Guidobaldo Abatini (1600–1656), Italian painter of the Baroque period, active mainly in Rome and Usigni
- Guidobaldo del Monte (1545–1607), Italian mathematician, philosopher and astronomer
- Guidobaldo da Montefeltro (1472–1508), Italian condottiero and the Duke of Urbino from 1482 to 1508
- Guidobaldo II della Rovere (1514–1574), Italian condottiero, Duke of Urbino from 1538 until his death
- Stadio Raul Guidobaldi, a stadium in Rieti, Italy

== See also ==
- Portrait of Federico da Montefeltro with His Son Guidobaldo, by Pedro Berruguete, dating from c. 1475
- Portrait of Guidobaldo da Montefeltro, by Raphael, dating from around 1506
- Guido Ubaldus (disambiguation)
- Guidoval
