= Portrait of Elisabetta Gonzaga =

1504–1505 painting by Raphael

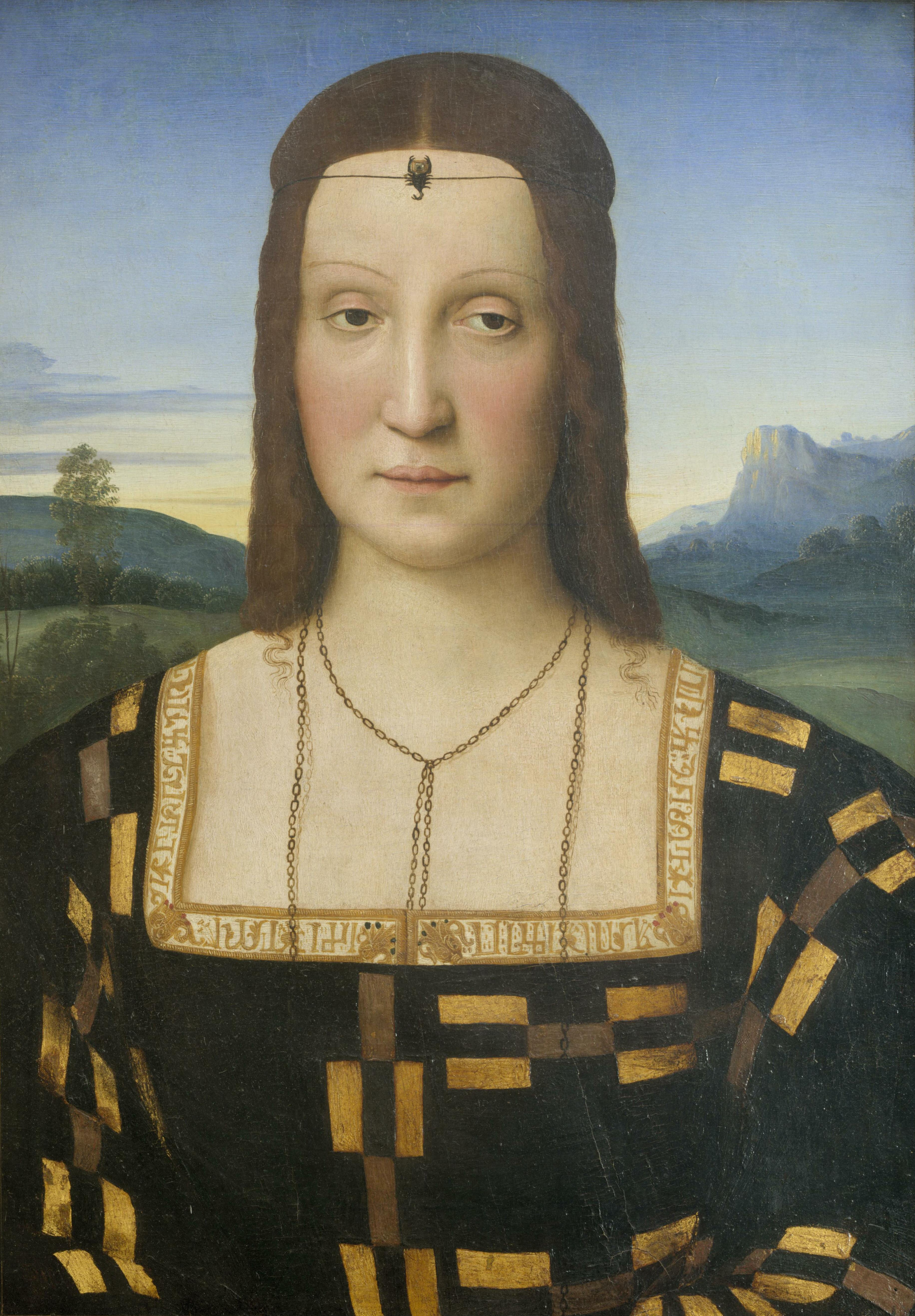
- Artist: Raphael
- Year: c. 1504–1505
- Medium: Oil on wood
- Dimensions: 52.9 cm × 37.4 cm (20.8 in × 14.7 in)
- Location: Uffizi, Florence

Portrait of Elisabetta Gonzaga is an oil on wood painting attributed to the Italian Renaissance artist Raphael, completed c. 1504–1505, and today housed in the Uffizi Gallery, Florence.

== History ==
Contemporary sources speak of a portrait of Elisabetta Gonzaga executed by Raphael.

The painting was likely part of the Ducal collection of Urbino, brought to Florence in 1635 as Vittoria della Rovere's dowry. It is mentioned with certainty for the first time in 1773, when it was transferred from Palazzo Pitti to the Grand Ducal wardrobe of the Uffizi. In a 1784 inventory it was attributed to Giovanni Bellini's school, while that of 1825 listed it as by Andrea Mantegna.

It was attributed to Raphael for the first time in 1905. Other artists to whom the portrait has been assigned include Francesco Francia, Giovan Francesco Caroto, Francesco Bonsignori and Albrecht Dürer.

== Description ==
The woman portrayed is Elisabetta Gonzaga, wife of Duke Guidobaldo I of Urbino (the portrait is now exhibited at the Uffizi next to the latter's) and a woman of literary and artistic interests. Details include the black dress with applied trim in a patchwork pattern, and the scorpion-like ferronière on the woman's forehead. Her hairdo includes the coazzone, a long plait which is present also in a medal of her now at the British Museum.

== See also ==
- Portrait of Guidobaldo da Montefeltro
- Portrait of Emilia Pia da Montefeltro

== Sources ==
- De Vecchi, Pierluigi (1975). Raffaello. Milan: Rizzoli.
- Scaricamazza, Dario (2023). (in Italian). Lo scorpione di Elisabetta Gonzaga. Raffaello e la creazione del segno, Milan, Preprint.
