= Portrait of Guidobaldo da Montefeltro =

Painting by Raphael

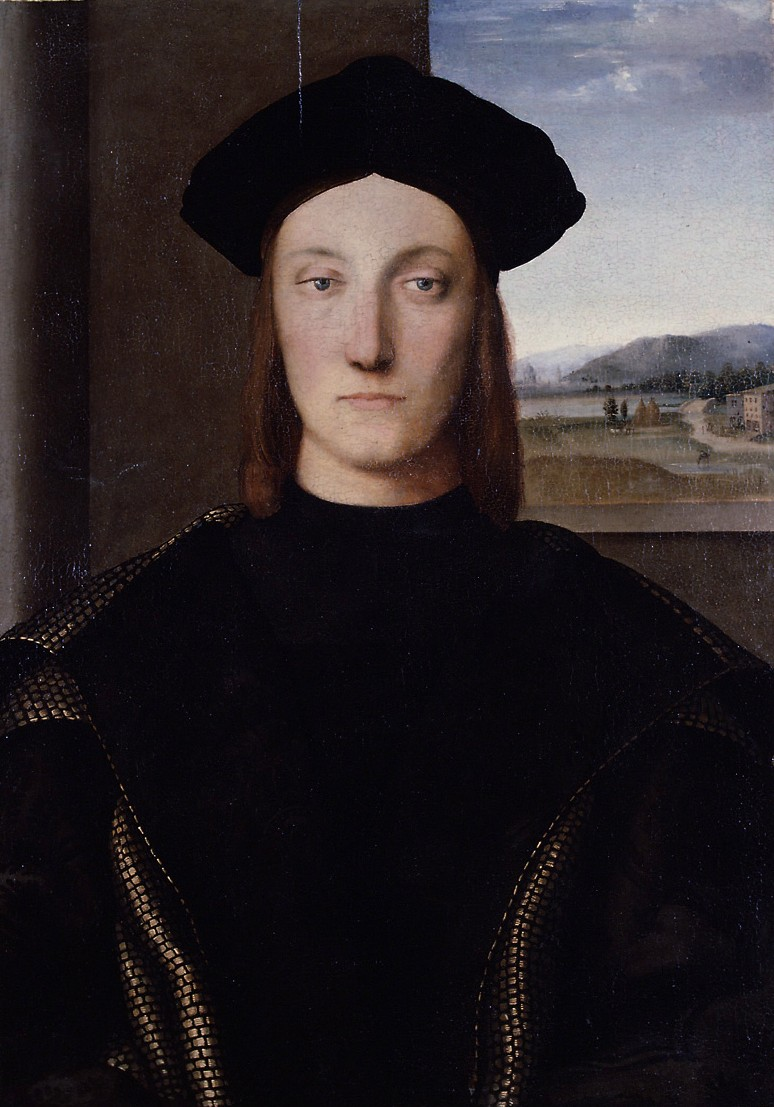
- Artist: Raphael
- Year: c. 1506
- Medium: Oil on wood
- Dimensions: 69 cm × 52 cm (27 in × 20 in)
- Location: Uffizi, Florence

The Portrait of Guidobaldo da Montefeltro is a picture by the Italian Renaissance artist Raphael, dating from around 1506 and housed in the Uffizi Gallery, Florence. It portrays Guidobaldo da Montefeltro, duke of Urbino.

== History ==
The painting was likely part of the Ducal collection of Urbino, brought to Florence in 1635 as Vittoria della Rovere's dowry. It is mentioned with certainty for the first time in 1623 in an inventory of the Ducal Palace of Pesaro.

It was attributed to Raphael for the first time in 1905. Other artists to whom the portrait has been assigned include Francesco Francia and Cesare Tamaroccio.

== See also ==
- Portrait of Elisabetta Gonzaga
- Portrait of Emilia Pia da Montefeltro
- Portrait of Federico da Montefeltro with His Son Guidobaldo

== Sources ==
- De Vecchi, Pierluigi (1975). Raffaello. Milan: Rizzoli.
