= Guido Ubaldus =

Guido Ubaldus may refer to:

- Guidobaldo del Monte (1545–1607), Italian mathematician and astronomer, friend of Galileo
- Luigi Guido Grandi (1671–1742), Italian priest and mathematician, best known for the rose curve and Grandi's series
