= Brera Madonna =

Painting by Piero della Francesca

The Brera Madonna
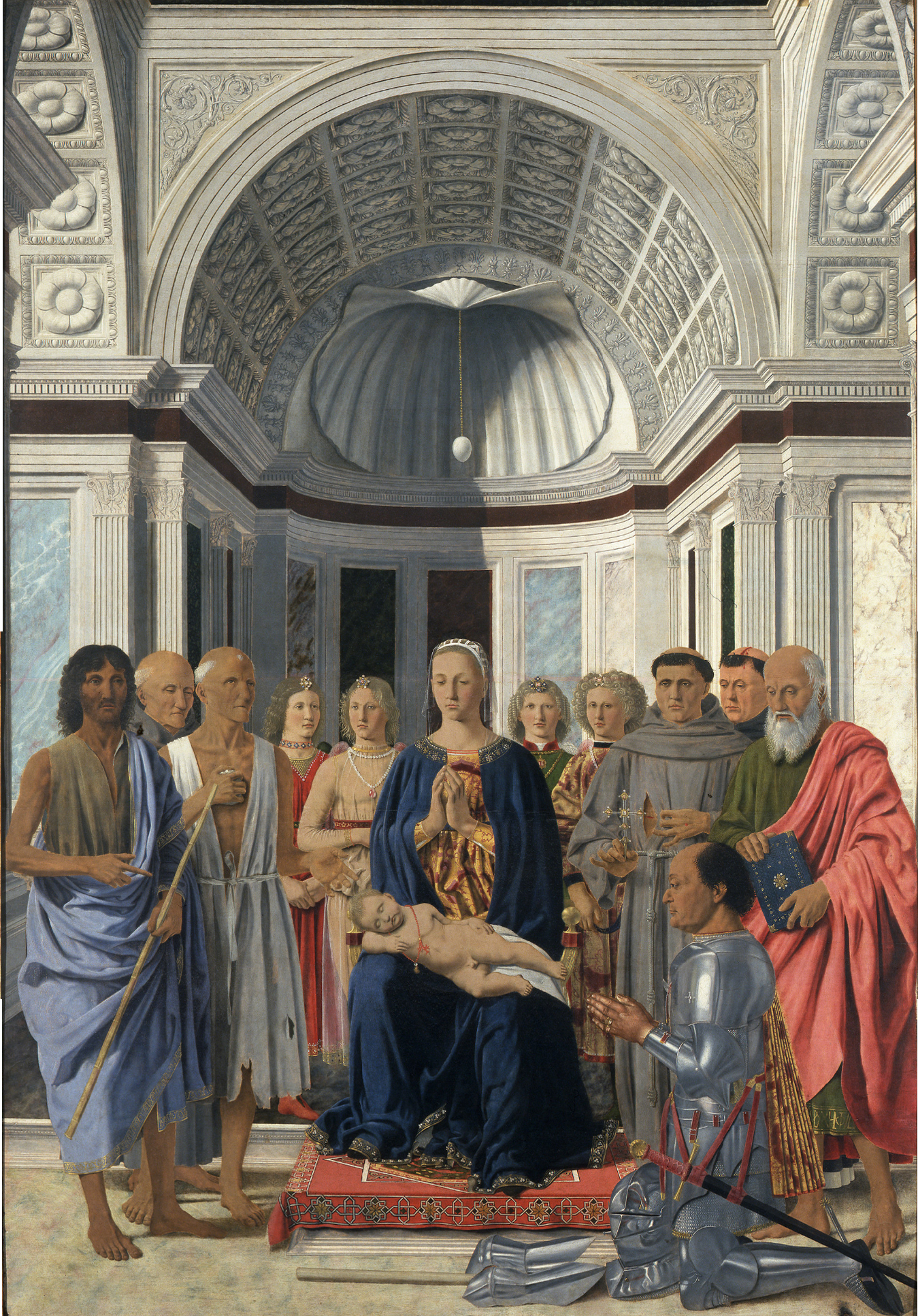
- Artist: Piero della Francesca
- Year: 1472
- Medium: Tempera on panel
- Dimensions: 248 cm × 150 cm (98 in × 59 in)
- Location: Pinacoteca di Brera, Milan

The Brera Madonna (also known as the Pala di Brera, the Montefeltro Altarpiece or Brera Altarpiece) is a painting by the Italian Renaissance master Piero della Francesca, executed in 1472–1474. It is housed in the Pinacoteca di Brera of Milan, where it was deposited by Napoleon.

The work, of a type known as a sacra conversazione, was commissioned by Federico III da Montefeltro, Duke of Urbino, to celebrate the birth of Federico's son, Guidobaldo. According to other sources, it would celebrate his conquest of several castles in the Maremma.

== Dating ==
The painting was executed between 1472 and 1474; the terminus ante quem (latest possible date) is established by the absence from Federico's figure of the insignia of the Order of the Garter, which he received in the later year. When it was rediscovered at the Brera at the end of the 19th century, the painting was so disfigured by darkened varnish it was attributed to Fra Carnevale (Bartolomeo di Giovanni Corradini), as Piero's use of oil technique was not yet known.

Some sources suggest that the work was commissioned to celebrate the birth of Federico's son, Guidobaldo, who was born in 1472. According to this hypothesis, the Child could represent Guidobaldo, while the Virgin may have the appearance of Battista Sforza, Federico's wife, who died in the same year and was buried at San Bernardino.

== Description ==
The work represents a sacred conversation, with the Virgin enthroned and the sleeping Child in the middle, surrounded by a host of angels and saints. On the right low corner, kneeling and wearing his armor, the patron of arts, duke and condottiero Federico da Montefeltro. Federico's choice of wearing armor had not been observed in other donor paintings of the past century. The donning of armor here signifies his military prowess and devotion to protect his faith, a new concept for presenting in armor when in a holy presence. The background consists of the apse of a church in Renaissance classical style, which is rendered in such meticulous perspective that the feigned depth of the coffer-vaulted apse at the rear can be calculated. At the center, hanging by a thread from the apse shell is an egg, emblem alike of Mary's fecundity and the promise of regeneration and immortality.

The Child wears a necklace of deep red coral beads, a color which alludes to blood, a symbol of life and death, but also to the redemption brought by Christ. Coral was also used for teething, and often worn by babies. The saints at the left of the Madonna are generally identified as John the Baptist, Bernardino of Siena (dedicatee of the painting's original location) and Jerome; on the right would be Francis, Peter Martyr and Andrew. In the last figure, the Italian historian Ricci has identified a portrait of Luca Pacioli, a mathematician born in Sansepolcro like Piero della Francesca. The presence of John the Baptist would be explained as he was the patron saint of Federico's wife, while St. Jerome was the protector of Humanists. Francis, finally, would be present as the painting was originally thought for the Franciscan church of San Donato degli Osservanti, where Federico was later buried.

Modern cleaning has revealed the great detail in characters' clothes, the angels' jewels, Federico's reflective armor and the oriental carpet beneath the feet of the Virgin, reflecting the influence of Early Netherlandish painting.

The apse ends with a shell semi-dome from which an ostrich egg is hanging. The shell was a symbol of the new Venus, Mary (in fact it is perpendicular to her head) and of eternal beauty. According to another hypothesis, the egg would be a pearl, and the shell would refer to the miracle of the virginal conception (the shell generates the pearl without any male intervention). The egg is generally considered a symbol of the Creation and, in particular, to Guidobaldo's birth; the ostrich was also one of the heraldic symbols of the Montefeltro family.

According to Italian art historian Carlo Ludovico Ragghianti, the work has been cut down on both sides, as shown by the portions of entablatures barely visible in the upper corners.

== See also ==
- Italian Renaissance painting
- Piero della Francesca

== Sources ==
- Zuggi, Stefano (1991). Piero della Francesca. Milan: Elemond.
