= Elisabetta Gonzaga =

Italian noblewoman (1471–1526)

- Duchess of Urbino
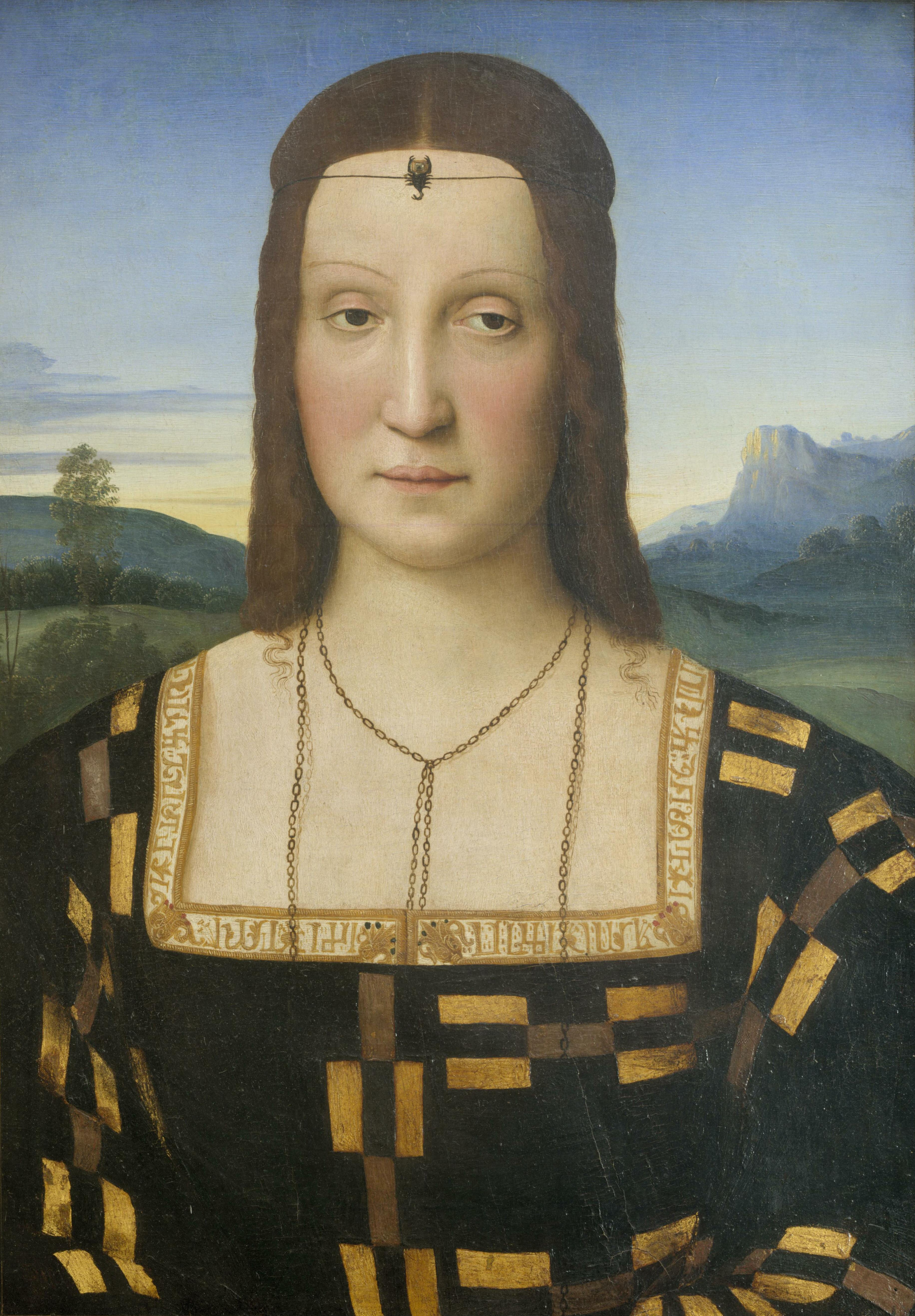
- Portrait of Elisabetta Gonzaga(c. 1504), attributed to Raphael
- Born: 1471; Mantua, Italy
- Died: 1526 (aged 54–55); Ferrara
- Spouse: Guidobaldo da Montefeltro
- Father: Federico I Gonzaga
- Mother: Margaret of Bavaria, Marchioness of Mantua

Elisabetta Gonzaga (1471–1526) was a noblewoman of the Italian Renaissance, the Duchess of Urbino by marriage to Duke Guidobaldo da Montefeltro. Because her husband was impotent, Elisabetta never had children of her own, but adopted her husband's nephew and heir, Francesco Maria I della Rovere. She was renowned for her cultured and virtuous life.

== Life ==
Elisabetta was born in Mantua, Italy, the second daughter of Federico I Gonzaga, Marquess of Mantua and Margaret of Bavaria, Marchioness of Mantua. A member of the House of Gonzaga, she was a sister of Francesco II Gonzaga, Marquess of Mantua.

She married Guidobaldo da Montefeltro, the duke of Urbino, in 1489. Guidobaldo was sickly and impotent, and they had no children, but Elisabetta refused to divorce him and nursed him through his illnesses. After his death, Elisabetta refused to remarry.

Elisabetta's education led her to a life in the company of some the greatest minds of late 15th century Italy. Her court attracted writers, artists, and scholars. Her nobility gave her contact and involvement in the power politics of 16th century Italy. She was the sister-in-law of Isabella d'Este, an influential Renaissance patron and political figure. Despite having poor health, Elisabetta was known to be a great horsewoman and would frequently attend hunts in the countryside around Urbino.

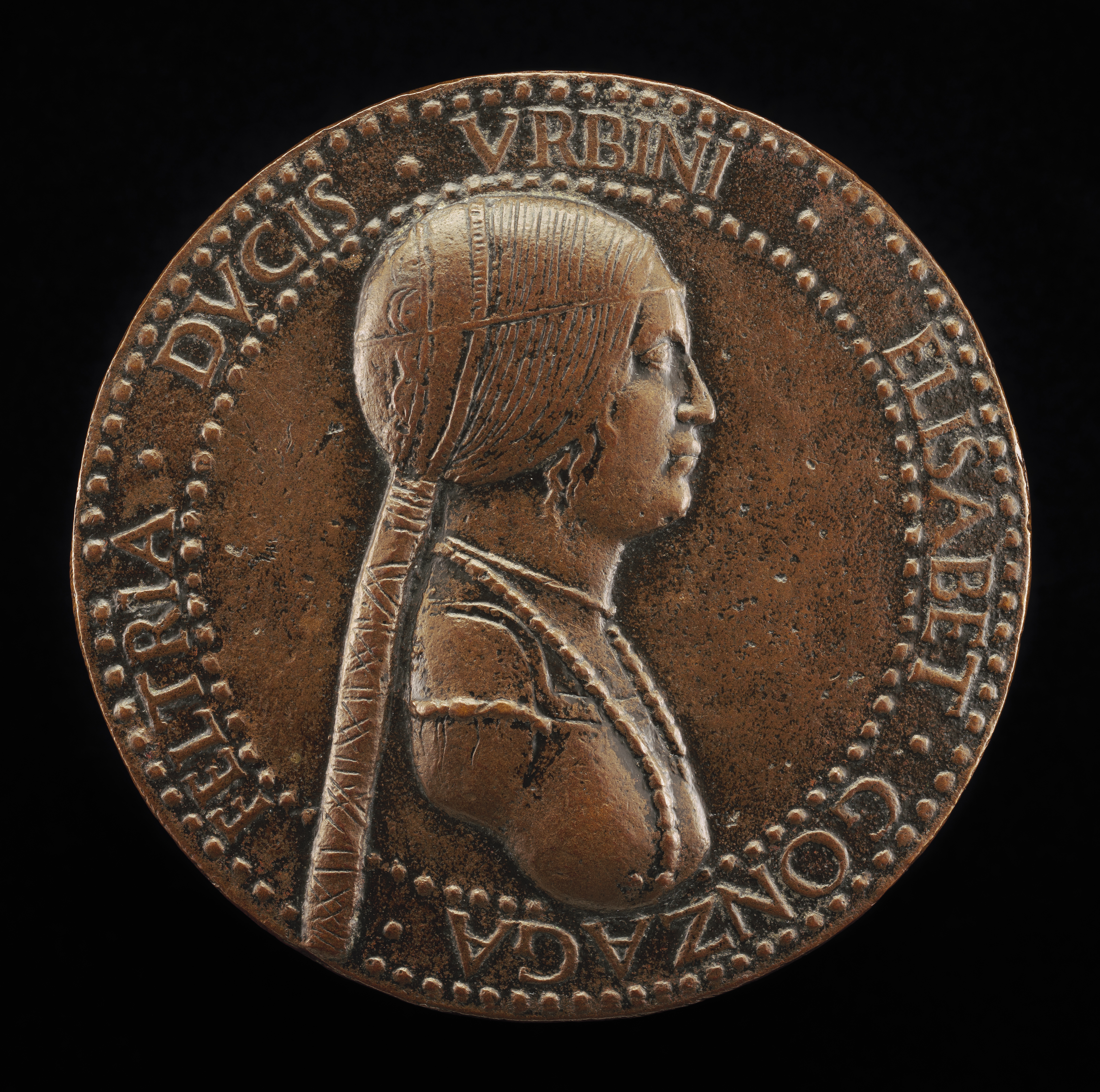
Adriano Fiorentino. Bronze medal of Elisabetta Gonzaga. probably after 1502. National Gallery of Art, Washington. Widener Collection.

On 21 June 1502 Cesare Borgia occupied Urbino, putting to flight Guidobaldo and forcing Elisabetta to remain in Mantua, where she had been staying as a guest. She remained there until 1503 and then joined Guidobaldo in Venice. They were restored to power in 1504. Having no children they adopted in the same year Francesco Maria I della Rovere, the child of Guidobaldo's sister, who was then fourteen, to secure the succession.

In 1502, Elisabetta reluctantly accompanied Lucrezia Borgia on her journey to Ferrara, where Lucrezia was married to Alfonso I d'Este. An eyewitness described her at the wedding thus:

On entering Ferrara she rode a black mule caparisoned in black velvet embroidered with woven gold, and wore a mantle of black velvet strewn with triangles of beaten gold; another day indoors she wore a mantle of brown velvet slashed, and caught up with chains of massive gold; another day a gown of black velvet striped with gold, with a jewelled necklace and diadem; and still another day, a black velvet robe embroidered with ciphers.

Following Guidobaldo's death in 1508 at the age of 36 she continued to live in Urbino as regent to the underage heir.

In 1509, Francesco Maria I was married to Eleonora Gonzaga, Elisabetta's niece, further consolidating the dynasty. Eleonora's mother was the first lady of the renaissance, Isabella d'Este.

However, in June 1516, Elisabetta was expelled from Urbino by Pope Leo X, who wanted to give the duchy to his nephew Lorenzo de' Medici, Duke of Urbino (Lorenzo II di Piero, called "Lorenzino"). Together with her niece Eleonora Gonzaga and without a penny, they found refuge in Ferrara, where Elisabetta died in 1526.

== Cultural references ==
Elisabetta Gonzaga was immortalized by the writer Baldassare Castiglione, whose work of 1528, The Courtier, was based on his interactions and conversations with her.

A portrait of her around the years 1504 to 1506 is attributed to the artist Raphael and is in the Uffizi gallery, Florence, Italy.

== Sources ==
- Bartlett, Kenneth R. (2013). A Short History of the Italian Renaissance. University of Toronto Press.
- Maria Bellonci, Lucrèce Borgia (1991), ISBN 2-87027-423-8
- Sarah Bradford, Lucrezia Borgia, Milano, Mondadori, 2005. ISBN 88-04-55627-7
- Baldassare Castiglione,The Book of the Courtier, Translated by Leonard Eckstein Opdycke, Published by Courier Dover Publications, 2003, ISBN 0-486-42702-1 Page 320 (note 12 to page 2)
- Englander, David (1990). Culture and Belief in Europe, 1450-1600: An Anthology of Sources. Blackwell Publishing. ISBN 0-631-16991-1.
- Findlen, Paula (2002). The Italian Renaissance: The Essential Readings. Blackwell Publishing. ISBN 0-631-22283-9.
- Hall, Marcia B. (2005). The Cambridge Companion to Raphael. Cambridge University Press. ISBN 0-521-80809-X.
- Jansen, S. (2008). Debating Women, Politics, and Power in Early Modern Europe. Palgrave Macmillan.
- Shaw, Christine (2019). Isabella d'Este: A Renaissance Princess. Routledge.
