= Portrait of Federico da Montefeltro with His Son Guidobaldo =

15th-century painting

Portrait of Federico da Montefeltro and His Son Guidobaldo
- Artist: Pedro Berruguete or (and) Justus van Gent
- Year: c. 1475
- Medium: Tempera on wood
- Dimensions: 138.5 cm × 77 cm (54.5 in × 30 in)
- Location: Galleria nazionale delle Marche, Urbino

The Portrait of Federico da Montefeltro and His Son Guidobaldo is a painting dating from c. 1475 and housed in the Galleria nazionale delle Marche in Urbino, Italy. There is no consensus on the attribution of the authorship of the painting. The Flemish painter Justus van Gent (whose real name was Joos van Wassenhove) and the Spanish painter Pedro Berruguete are the main contenders for the honour as both painters are believed to have been working in Urbino at the time the painting was made. The painting is part of a series of 28 portrait paintings of 'uomini famosi' (the Famous men) made for the study of Duke of Urbino Federico da Montefeltro (Musée du Louvre, Paris and Galleria Nazionale, Urbino).

== Attribution ==
Various artists have been proposed as the author of the series of the Famous men, to which the Portrait belongs. Justus van Gent and Pedro Berruguete currently receive the strongest support. The case for van Gent is that the paintings in the series appear to be made by a painter who was grounded in Netherlandish technique but had become strongly influenced by Italian painting. In addition, in his biography of Federico da Montefeltro, his former librarian, Vespasiano da Bisticci, attests that van Gent made the series of 28 portraits of Famous men. Technological examination of the Famous men has revealed similarities of these works with another important earlier commission that van Gent completed for the duke in Urbino, the Communion of the Apostles. The underdrawing showed that there was stylistic continuity between these works. The examination also disclosed a number of changes in composition and execution, which may point to a reworking by another artist, who may have been Berruguete. The work could therefore be a collaborative studio work from the studio of van Gent in Urbino, where Berruguete may have been a collaborator.

The case for Berruguete rests on various arguments including the mention of a 'Pietro Spagnuolo pittore' in Urbino in 1477, a reference to the Famous men by Pablo de Cespedes dating from 1604, which could be regarded as an attribution to Berruguete (although Cespedes specifically stated that they were by a Spanish painter ‘other’ than Berruguete), the depiction of a Spanish-language book in the painting and stylistic similarities with later works of Berruguete. However, these later paintings are deemed to be inferior in style and technique to those in the Famous men series and unlikely to be the work of the same artist.

== Description ==
The work has an elongated vertical shape. In view of the use of perspective from the left (a constant feature in contemporary paintings at Urbino) it possibly was the left panel of a diptych or made to pair a pre-existing similar work.

It portrays Federico III da Montefeltro, humanist and military leader, in his studio, surrounded by the symbols of his power and interests. His armor, partially covered by a precious mantle with a stoat collar, refers to his primary role as condottiero. Further military hints include the necklace of the Order of the Ermine, as well as the helmet and the command baton on the ground. His left leg shows the Garter given by him by the King of England. Other official symbols of his international prestige is the mitre with pearls on the shelf at the left upper corner, which was a personal gift of the Ottoman sultan.

The duke sits on a sort of throne, and is reading a codex, an expensive item for the time, and also an allusion to his humanist interests. Near to Federico is his young son Guidobaldo, a future duke of Urbino, who also wears rich clothes and holds a command baton.

== See also ==
- Portrait of Guidobaldo da Montefeltro
