= Justus van Gent =

Early Netherlandish painter (c. 1410–1480)

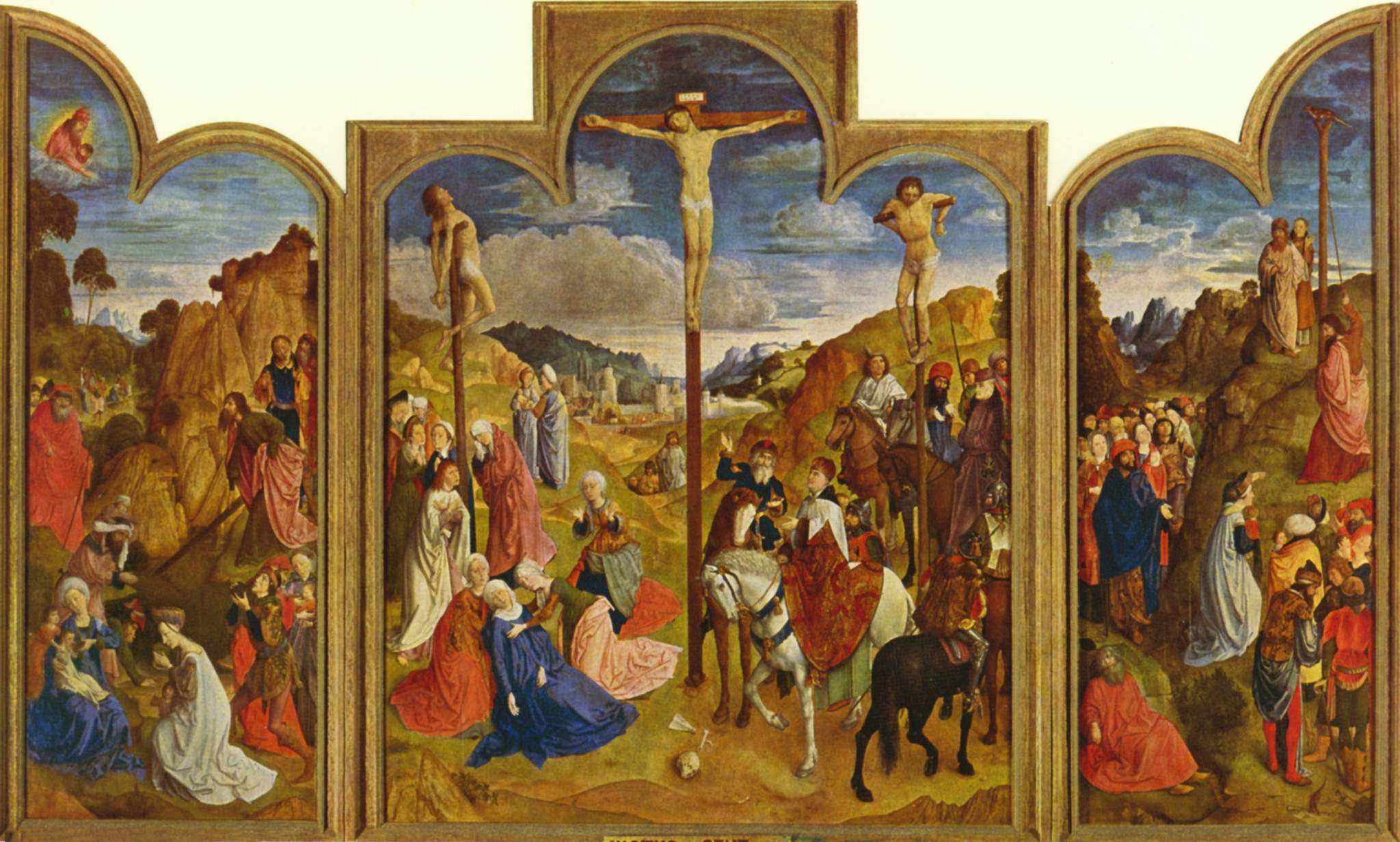
Calvary Triptych, 1464

Justus van Gent or Joos van Wassenhove (c. 1410 – c. 1480) was an Early Netherlandish painter, perhaps from Ghent, who after training and working in Flanders later moved to Italy where he worked for Federico da Montefeltro, duke of Urbino, and was known as Giusto da Guanto, or in modern Italian Giusto di Gand etc. The artist is known for his religious compositions executed in the early Netherlandish idiom and a series of portraits of famous men, which show the influence of early Italian Renaissance painting.

== Life ==
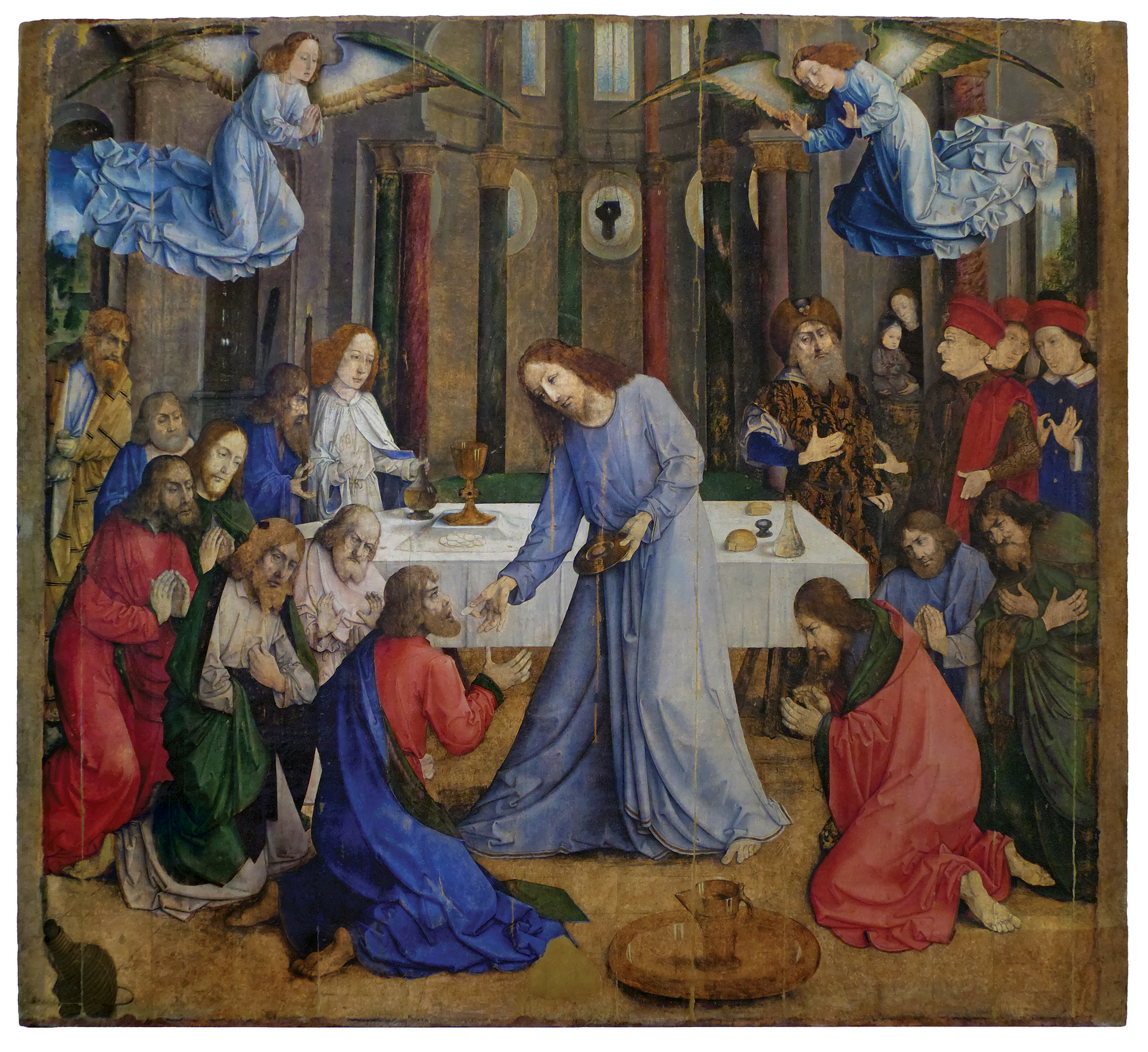
Communion of the Apostles

Very little is known about the early life of Joos van Wassenhove. It is believed that the artist referred to by Vasari and Guicciardini as 'Giusto da Guanto' (i.e. 'Justus of Ghent') is the painter Joos van Wassenhove, who became a member of the Antwerp Guild of St. Luke in 1460 and a freemaster in the Ghent painters' guild in 1464. While in Ghent, he vouched for Hugo van der Goes, Sanders Bening and Agnes van den Bossche when they entered the local painters' guild. Van Wassenhove seems to have enjoyed an international reputation as in 1467–68 he received payment for the production of 40 coats of arms of the Pope. Van Wassenhove travelled to Rome around 1470.

Between 1473 and 1475 he is documented in Urbino, where he operated a workshop. He was one of the court painters of duke Federico da Montefeltro, a leading politician and art patron of the Italian Renaissance. Da Montefeltro gave him the commission for the Communion of the Apostles painted for the brotherhood of the Corpus Domini in Urbino between 1472 and 1474. A portrait of da Montefeltro (with his broken nose in profile) in the company of Caterino Zeno, a Persian envoy to the court of Urbino, is included in the picture. Van Wassenhove participated in the decoration of the ducal residences in Urbino and Gubbio. This included a commission for a portrait series of 'uomini famosi' (famous men) for the study of da Montefeltro (Louvre Museum, Paris and Galleria Nazionale, Urbino). He died around 1480.

== Work ==
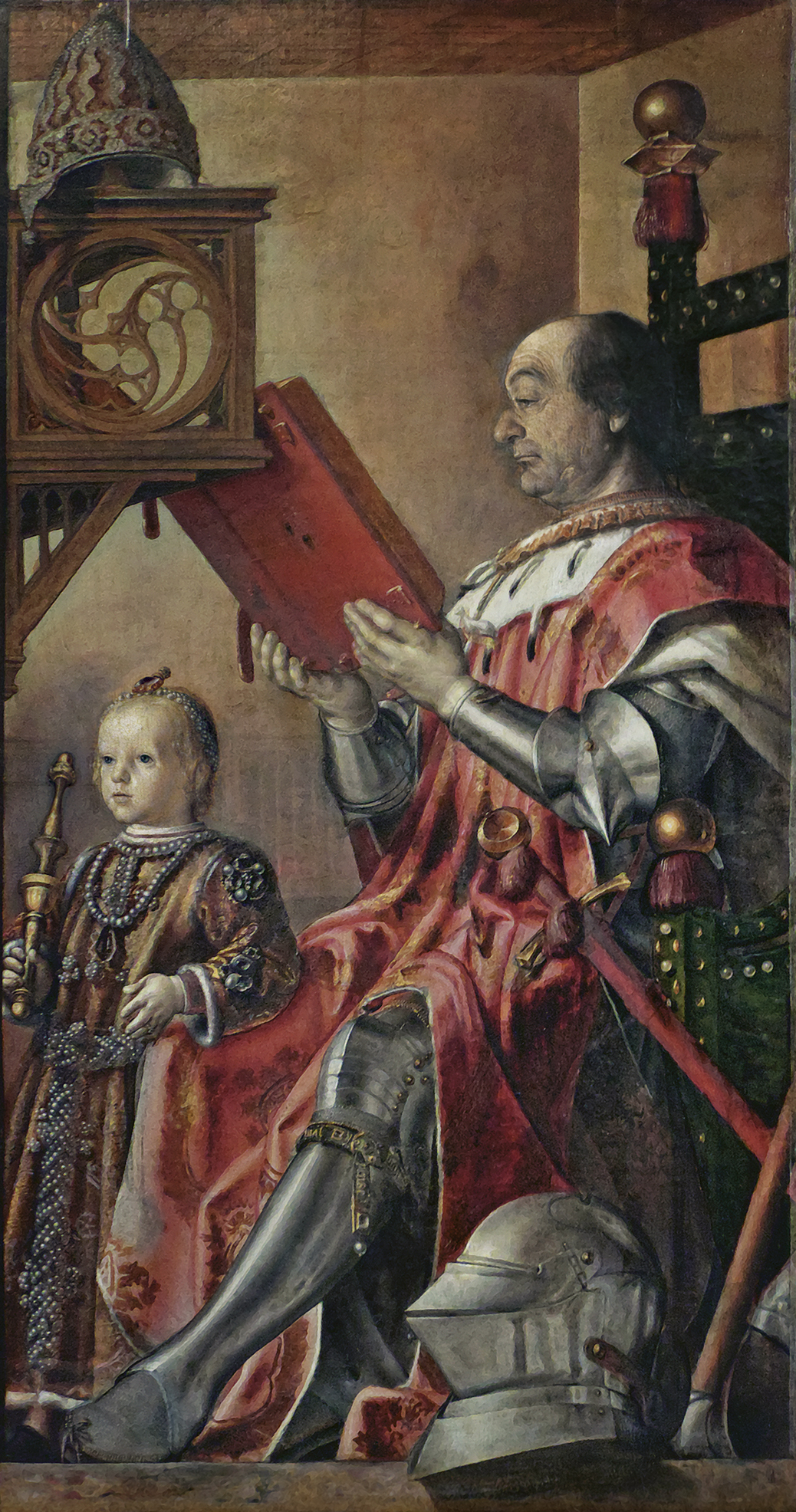
Portrait of Federico da Montefeltro with His Son Guidobaldo, from the Famous men series

Two works from the time before he left for Italy have been preserved: the monumental Crucifixion Altarpiece or Calvary Triptych (in the Saint Bavo Cathedral, Ghent) and the Adoration of the Magi (Metropolitan Museum of Art, New York). The latter painting was possibly commissioned for a convent near Burgos in Spain. For this reason the picture was painted on canvas so it could be rolled up for easy transport. The stage-like space and arrangement of the main figures in two parallel diagonal lines seem to suggest an inspiration by theatre reenactments of the story of the Epiphany. Both these early paintings are characterized by monumentality. The facial features of the figures and colour spectrum are closely related to the oeuvre of Hugo van der Goes. The two masters likely worked together before van Wassenhove left for Rome. There is also a relationship with the work of Dieric Bouts.

The Communion of the Apostles (a.k.a. The Institution of the Eucharist, sometimes called The Last Supper) for the Confraternity of Corpus Domini in Urbino shows some adaptations from the characteristically Netherlandish high viewpoint and decoratively organized surface of the Calvary Triptych. Van Wassenhove also increased the size of the figures relative to the picture space. The work cites Dieric Bouts' The Martyrdom of St Erasmus in the figure of the Persian envoy. An enlarged version of the Communion of the Apostles shows that Jesus Christ is depicted with light rays originating from his head which is also surrounded by a circular aureola both of which constitute a halo. All other works attributed to Joos van Wassenhove were painted on commission by Federico da Montefeltro.

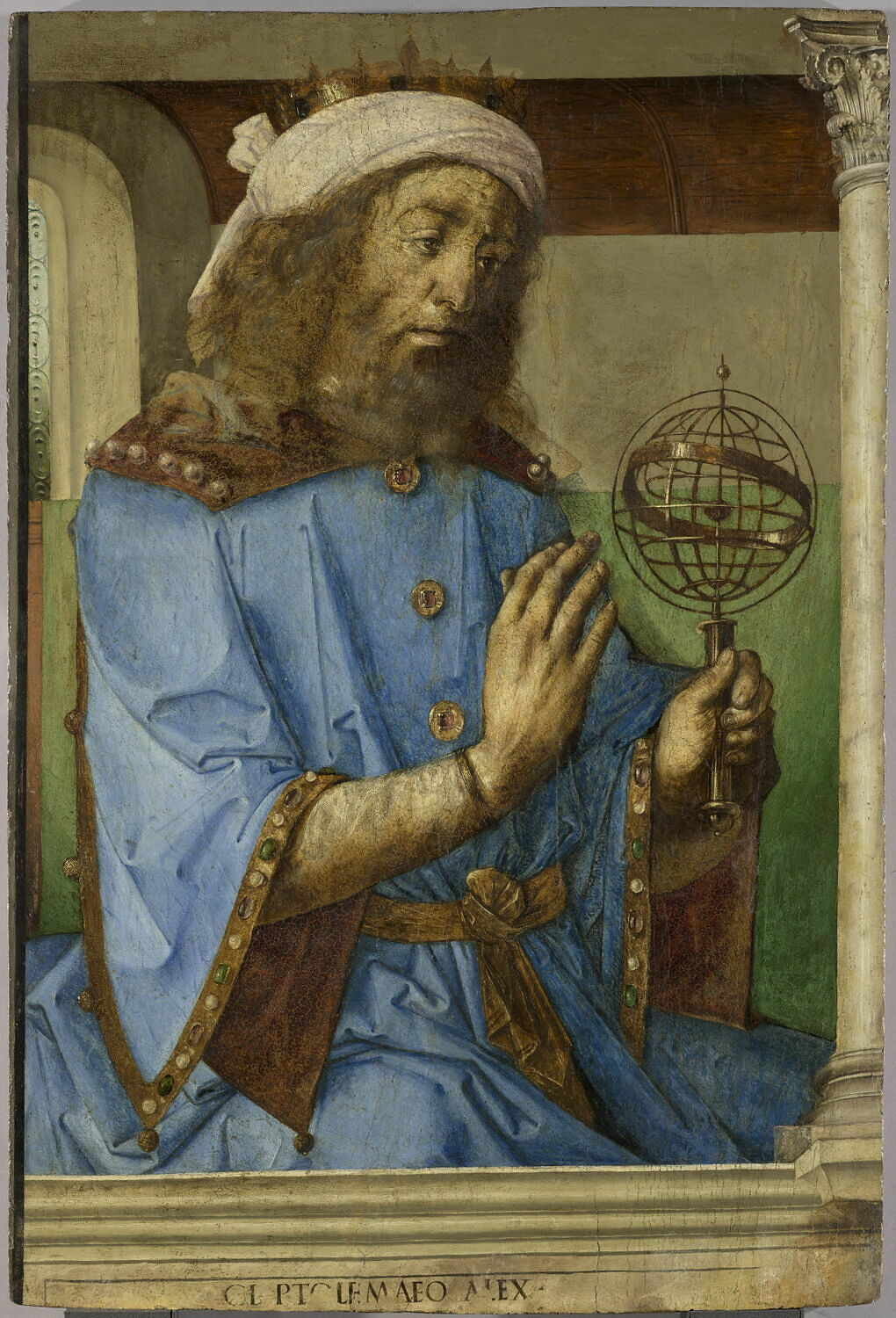
Ptolemy with an armillary sphere model, from the Famous men series

A series of 28 portraits of Famous men, which are still in existence and part of the collections of the Louvre and the Galleria Nazionale delle Marche in Urbino, have been attributed to Joos van Wassenhove. There are many arguments for such attribution. The paintings appear to be made by a painter grounded in Netherlandish technique who had become strongly influenced by Italian painting. In addition, in his biography of Federico da Montefeltro, his former librarian, Vespasiano da Bisticci, attests that van Wassenhove made the series of 28 portraits of Famous men. Technological examination of the Famous men has revealed similarities of these works with the other important earlier commission that van Wassenhove completed for the duke in Urbino, i.e. the Communion of the Apostles. The underdrawing showed that there was stylistic continuity between these works. The examination also disclosed a number of changes in composition and execution, which may point to a reworking by another artist. The attribution to van Wassenhove of some or all of the works in the Famous men series has not received unanimous support. Various other artists have been proposed as the author of the Famous men series, of whom the Spanish painter Pedro Berruguete has received strong support. The case for Berruguete rests on various arguments including the mention of a 'Pietro Spagnuolo pittore' in Urbino in 1477, a reference to the Famous men by Pablo de Cespedes dating from 1604, which could be regarded as an attribution to Berruguete (although Cespedes specifically stated that they were by a Spanish painter 'other' than Berruguete), the depiction of a Spanish-language book in a painting in the series and stylistic similarities with later works of Berruguete. Although the matter of attribution is still unresolved the known pictures of this Spanish artist are inferior in style and technique to those in the Famous men series and are unlikely the work of the same artist. Another hypothesis is that the work was a collaborative effort by the studio of van Wassenhove in Urbino, in which Berruguete may have worked as a collaborator.

Further attributed to Joos van Wassenhove are two paintings from a series on the liberal arts: Music and Rhetoric (both at the National Gallery London). Two other paintings from this series were destroyed during World War II.

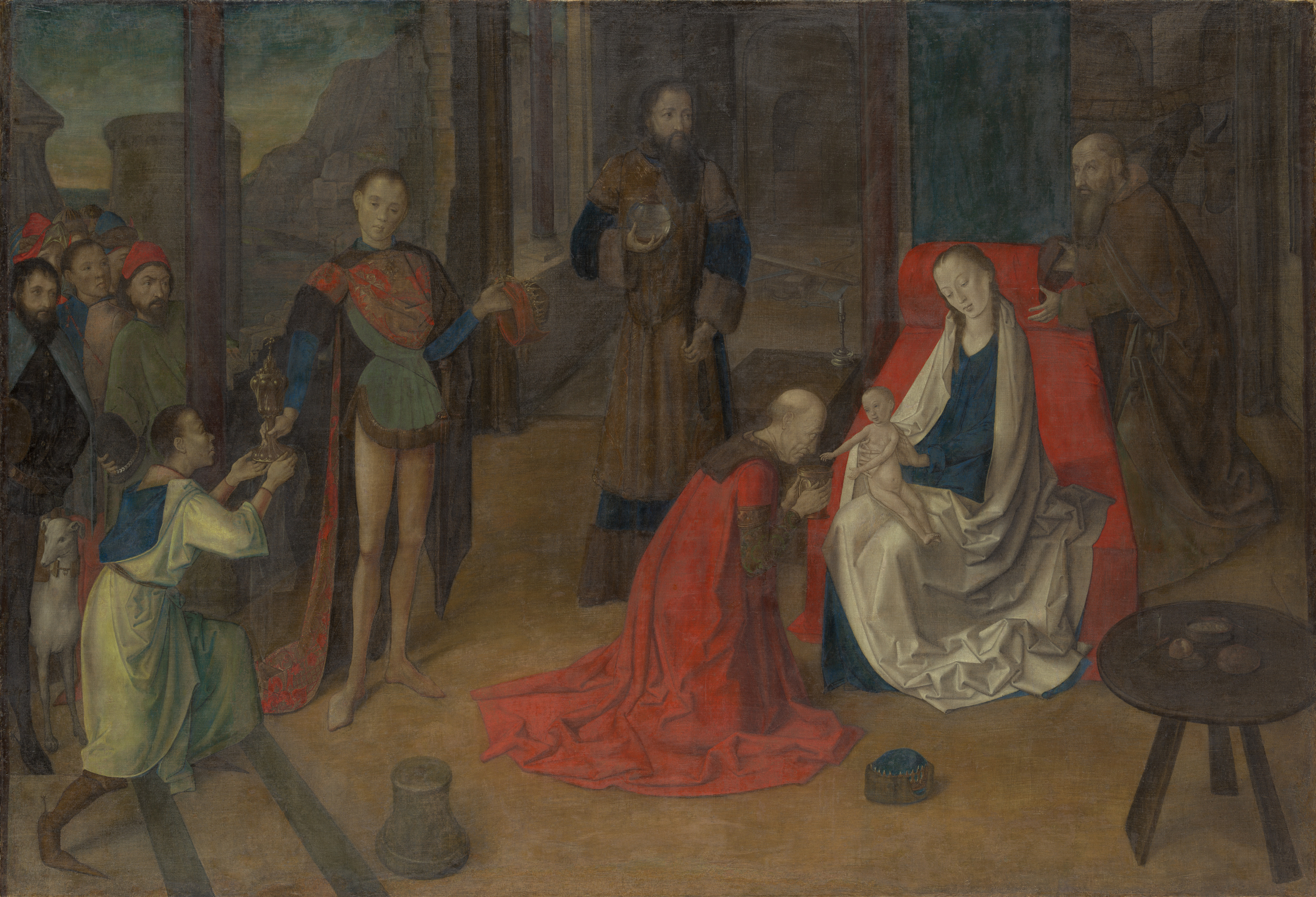
Adoration of the Magi

== Works ==
- Adoration of the Magi
- Calvary Triptych
- Communion of the Apostles
- Famous Men
- Liberal Arts
