= Guidobaldo da Montefeltro =

Italian condottiero

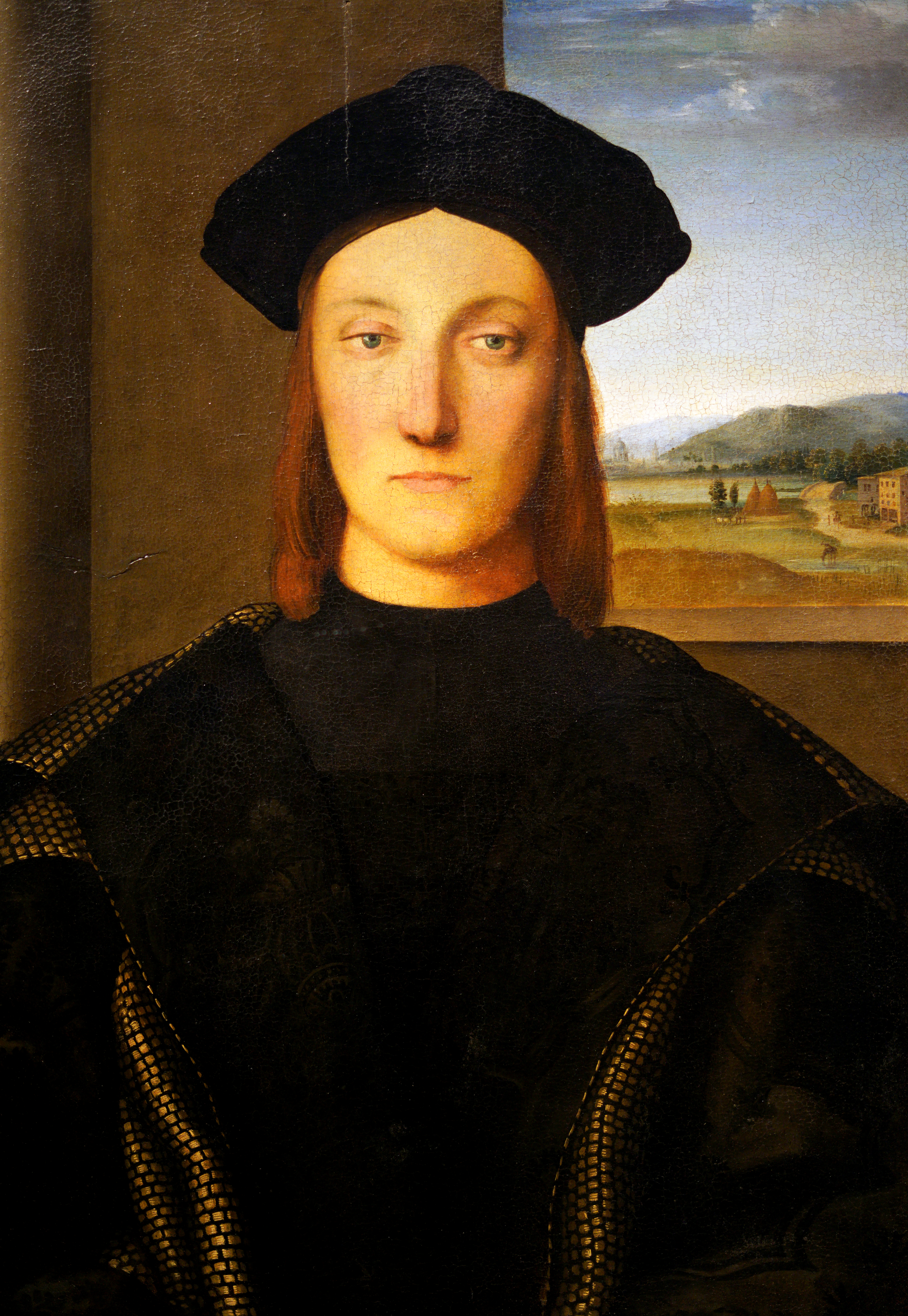
- Portrait c. 1507

Duke of Urbino
- 1st Reign: 1482–1502
- Predecessor: Federico III da Montefeltro
- Successor: Cesare Borgia
- 2nd Reign: 1503–1508
- Predecessor: Cesare Borgia
- Successor: Francesco Maria I della Rovere
- Born: 25 January 1472; Gubbio, Duchy of Urbino
- Died: 10 April 1508 (aged 36); Fossombrone, Duchy of Urbino
- Spouse: Elisabetta Gonzaga
- House: Montefeltro
- Father: Federico III da Montefeltro
- Mother: Battista Sforza

Guidobaldo (or Guido Ubaldo) da Montefeltro (25 January 1472 – 10 April 1508), also known as Guidobaldo I, was an Italian condottiero and the Duke of Urbino from 1482 to 1508.

== Biography ==
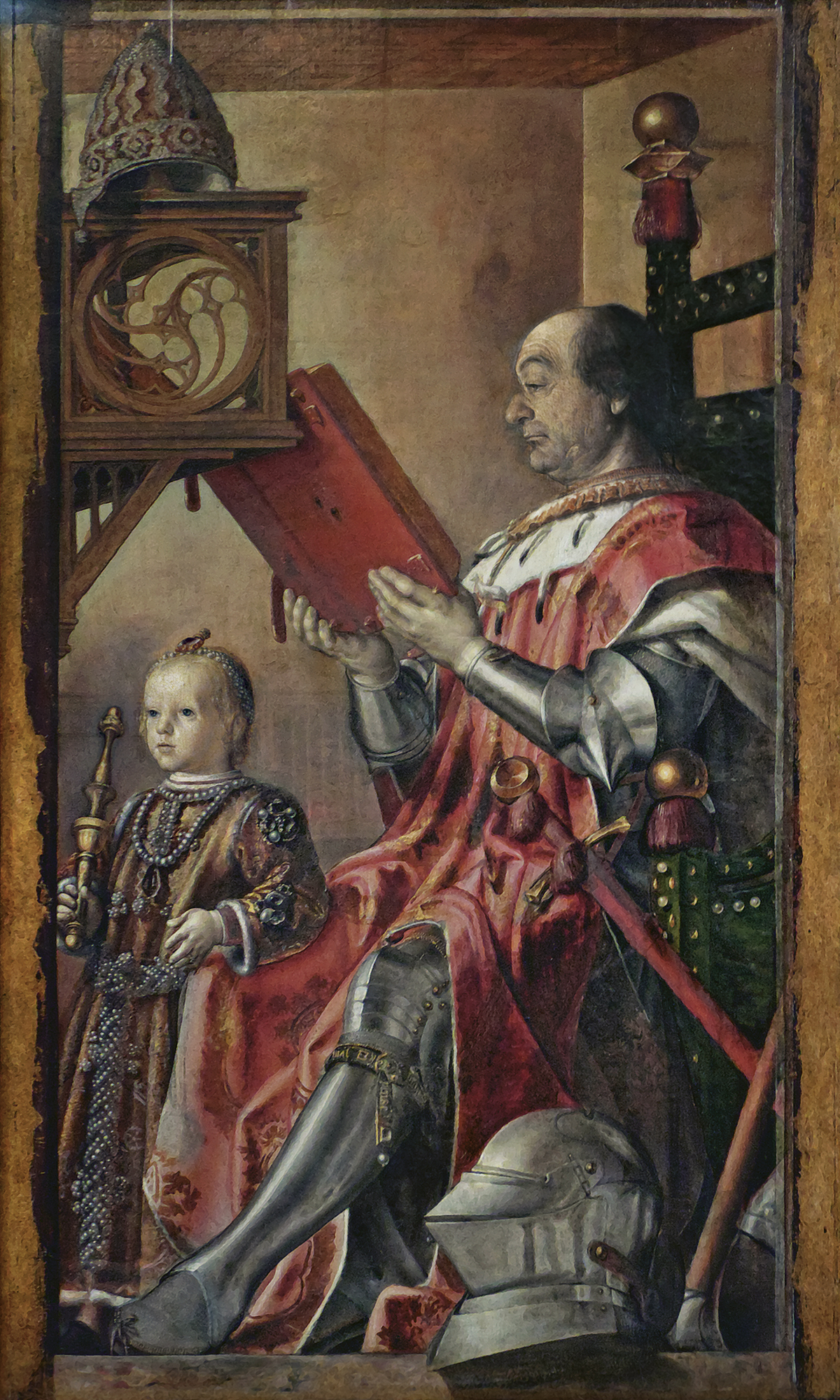
Portrait of Federico da Montefeltro with His Son Guidobaldo (c. 1475), by Justus van Gent or/and Pedro Berruguete

Born in Gubbio, he succeeded his father Federico da Montefeltro as Duke of Urbino in 1482.

Guidobaldo married Elisabetta Gonzaga, the sister of Francesco II Gonzaga, Marquis of Mantua. Guidobaldo was impotent, and they had no children, but Elisabetta refused to divorce him.

He fought as one of Pope Alexander VI's captains alongside the French troops of King Charles VIII of France during the latter's invasion of southern Italy; later, he was hired by the Republic of Venice against Charles. In 1496, while fighting for the pope near Bracciano, Guidobaldo was taken prisoner by the Orsini and the Vitelli, being freed the following year.

Guidobaldo was a participant in the Magione conspiracy against Cesare Borgia, whose expansionist campaigns made many of the local rulers uneasy about the status of their own lordships. Guidobaldo eventually was forced to flee Urbino in 1502 to escape the armies of Cesare Borgia, but returned after the death of Cesare Borgia's father, Pope Alexander VI, in 1503. He adopted as his heir Francesco Maria della Rovere, his sister's child and nephew of Pope Julius II, thus uniting the seigniory of Senigallia with Urbino. He aided Pope Julius II in reconquering the Romagna.

The court of Urbino was at that time one of the most refined and elegant in Italy. Many men of letters met there. The Italo-English historian Polydore Vergil may have worked in the service of Guidobaldo and Elisabetta as well as Baldassare Castiglione, the author of the book The Book of the Courtier, which describes the court of Urbino.

Suffering from gout, Guidobaldo died in Fossombrone at the age of 36, and was succeeded by his nephew Francesco Maria I della Rovere.

== See also ==
- Holy Conversation (Piero della Francesca)
- Portrait of Luca Pacioli
- Saint George and the Dragon (Raphael)

Italian nobility
| Preceded by Federico III | Duke of Urbino; 1482–1502 | Succeeded by Cesare Borgia |
| Preceded by Cesare Borgia | Duke of Urbino; 1503–1508 | Succeeded by Francesco Maria I della Rovere |
