= Ideal city =

Concept of a city plan based on a rational or moral objective

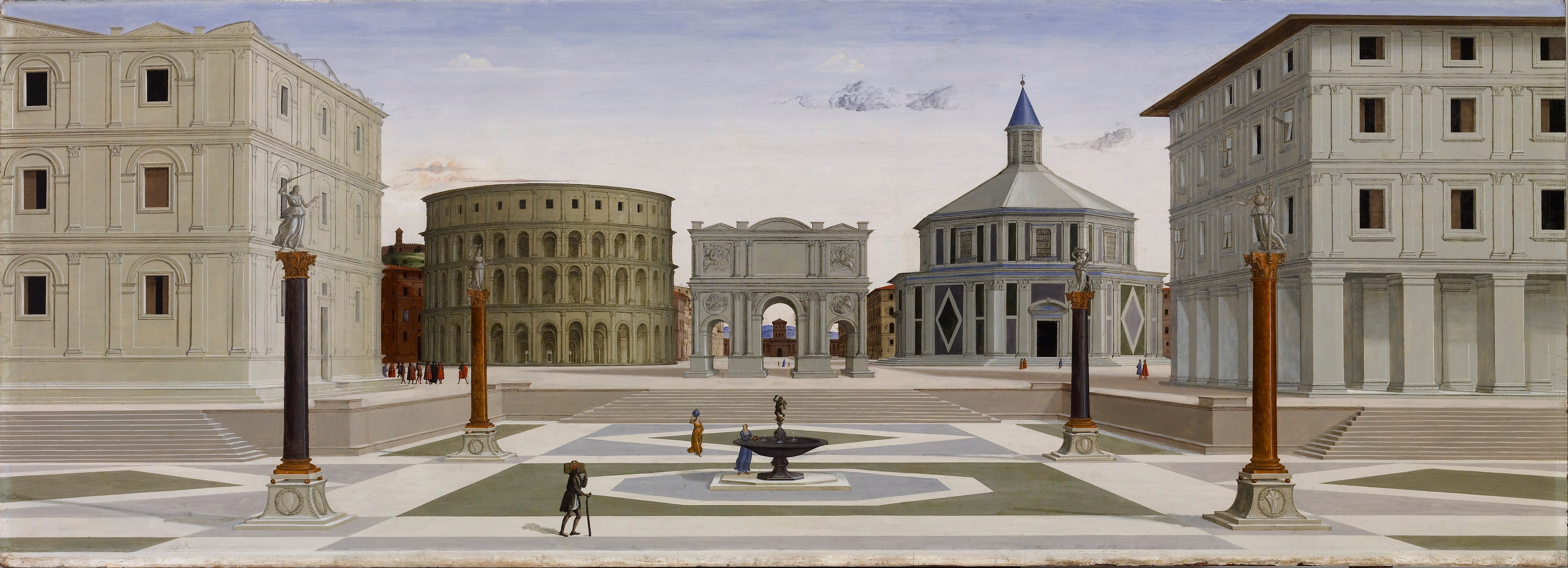
The ideal city attributed to Fra Carnevale, c. 1480–1484

In urban design, an ideal city is the concept of a plan for a city that has been conceived in accordance with a particular rational or moral objective.

== Concept ==
The "ideal" nature of such a city may encompass the moral, spiritual and juridical qualities of citizenship as well as the ways in which these are realised through urban structures including buildings, street layout, etc. The ground plans of ideal cities are often based on grids (in imitation of Roman town planning) or other geometrical patterns. The ideal city is often an attempt to deploy Utopian ideals at the local level of urban configuration and living space and amenity rather than at the culture- or civilisation-wide level of the classical Utopias such as St Thomas More's Utopia.

== History ==
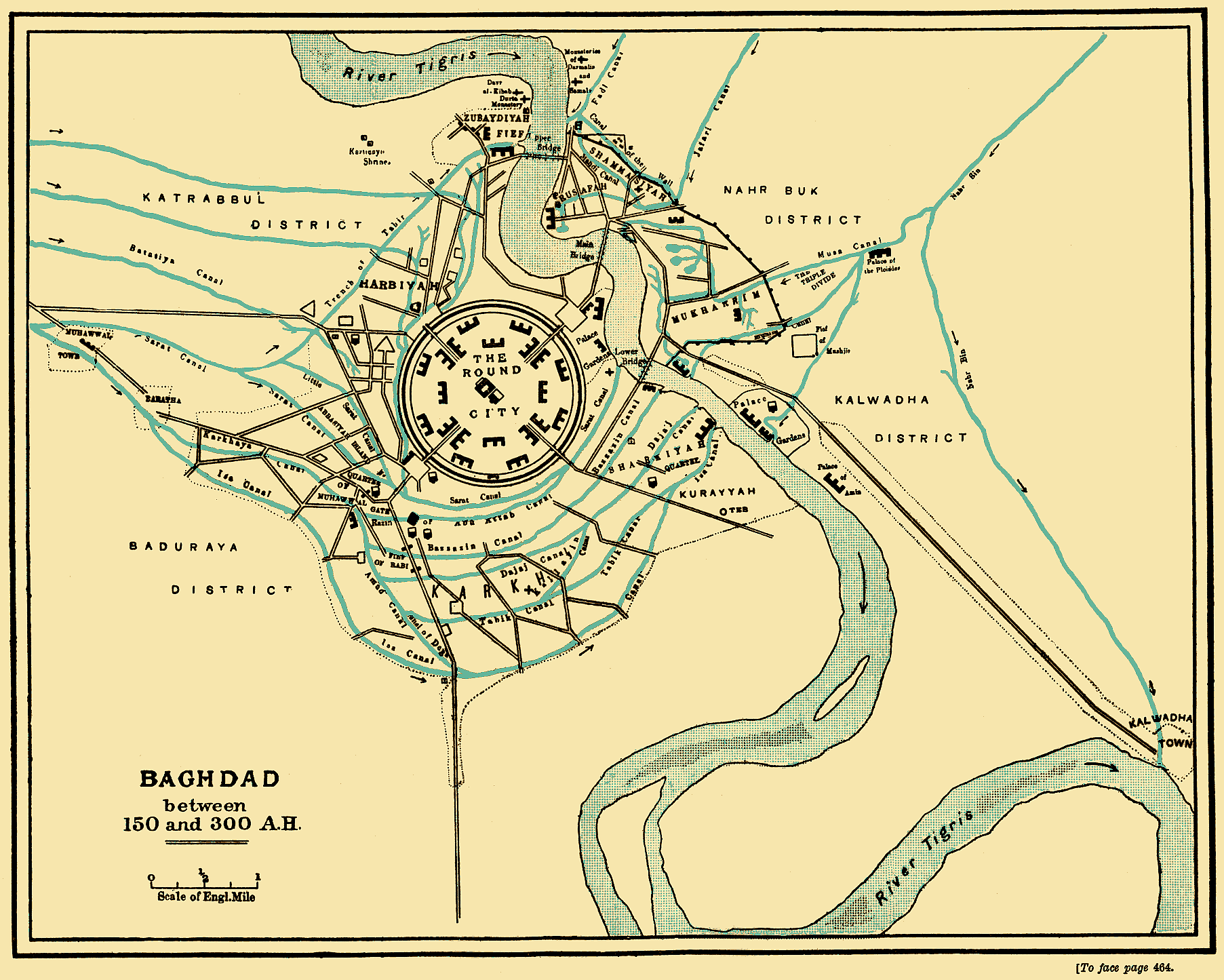
Caliph Al-Mansur's Round city of Baghdad, City of Peace, c. 8th century

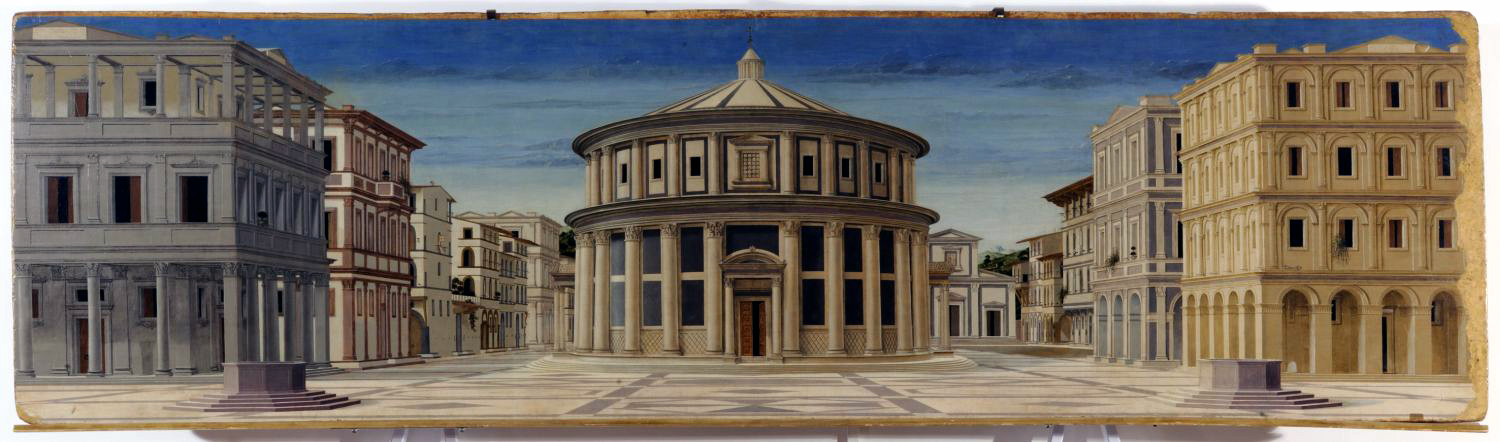
The ideal city attributed to Luciano Laurana or Melozzo da Forlì

Several attempts to develop ideal city plans are known from the Renaissance, and appear from the second half of the fifteenth century. The concept dates at least from the period of Plato, whose Republic is a philosophical exploration of the notion of the 'ideal city'. The nobility of the Renaissance, seeking to imitate the qualities of Classical civilisation, sometimes sought to construct such ideal cities either in reality or notionally through a reformation of manners and culture.

=== Leon Battista Alberti ===
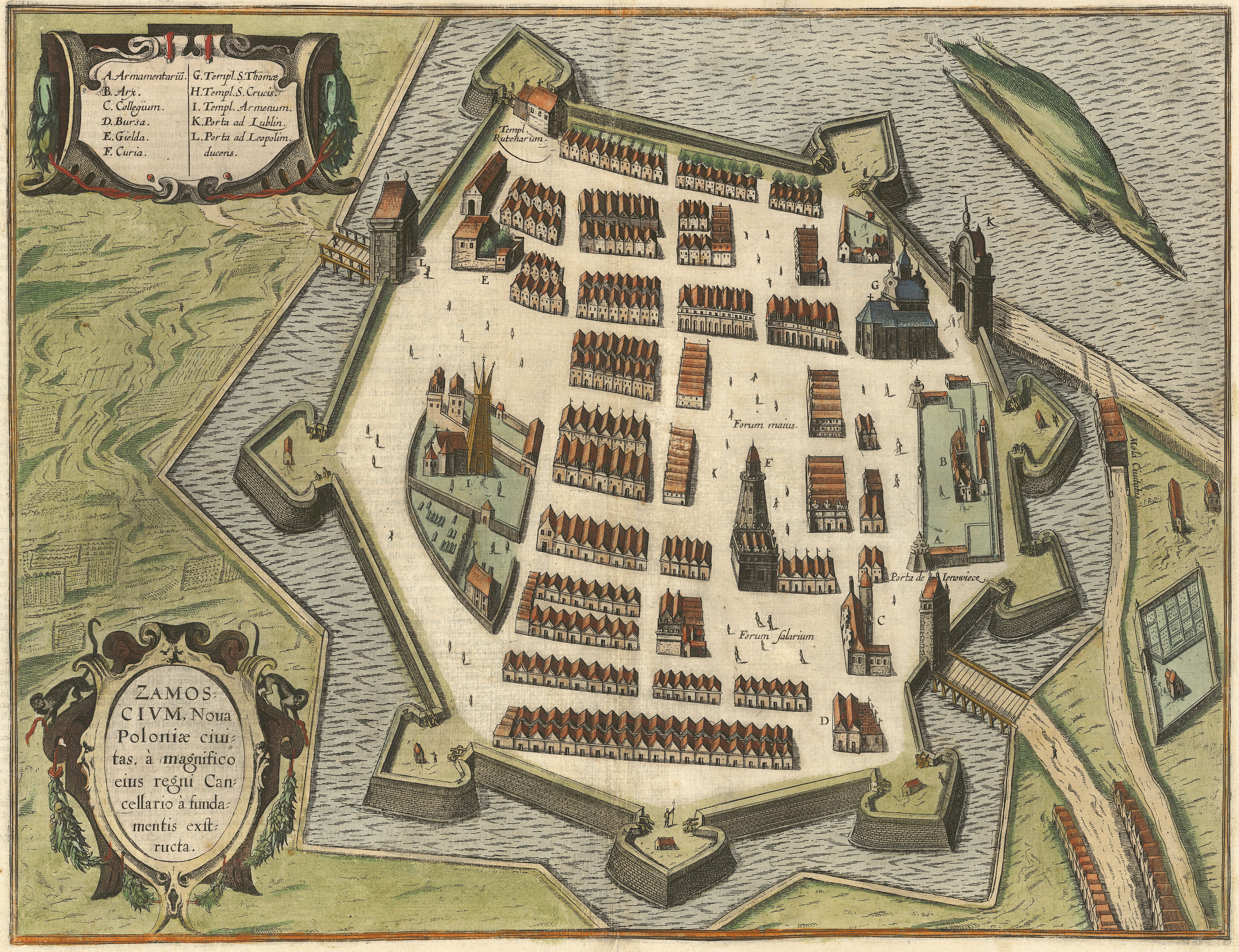
Zamość in the 17th century

The Renaissance concept of an Ideal town developed by Italian polymath Leon Battista Alberti (1404–1472), author of ten books of treatises on modern architecture titled De re aedificatoria written about 1450 with additions made until the time of his death in 1472, concerned the planning and building of an entire town as opposed to individual edifices for private patrons or ecclesiastical purposes.

Alberti insisted on choosing the location of the town first, followed by careful setting up of the size and direction of streets, then location of bridges and gates, and finally a building pattern ruled by perfect symmetry. One of the more prominent examples of a town modelled on this theory was Zamość founded in the 16th century by the chancellor Jan Zamoyski. At present, it is a World Heritage Site in Poland.

The ideal town was seen as a utopia to be achieved by disregarding the reasonably regular planimetrics of real, historic towns for standards – geometric, aesthetic or otherwise – of ideal perfection. Therefore the debate about ideal towns has become isolated from the debate about real, historic towns. In fact, there has often been the temptation to superimpose and identify this debate with one about utopia and those town models often linked to the utopian concept.

== Examples ==
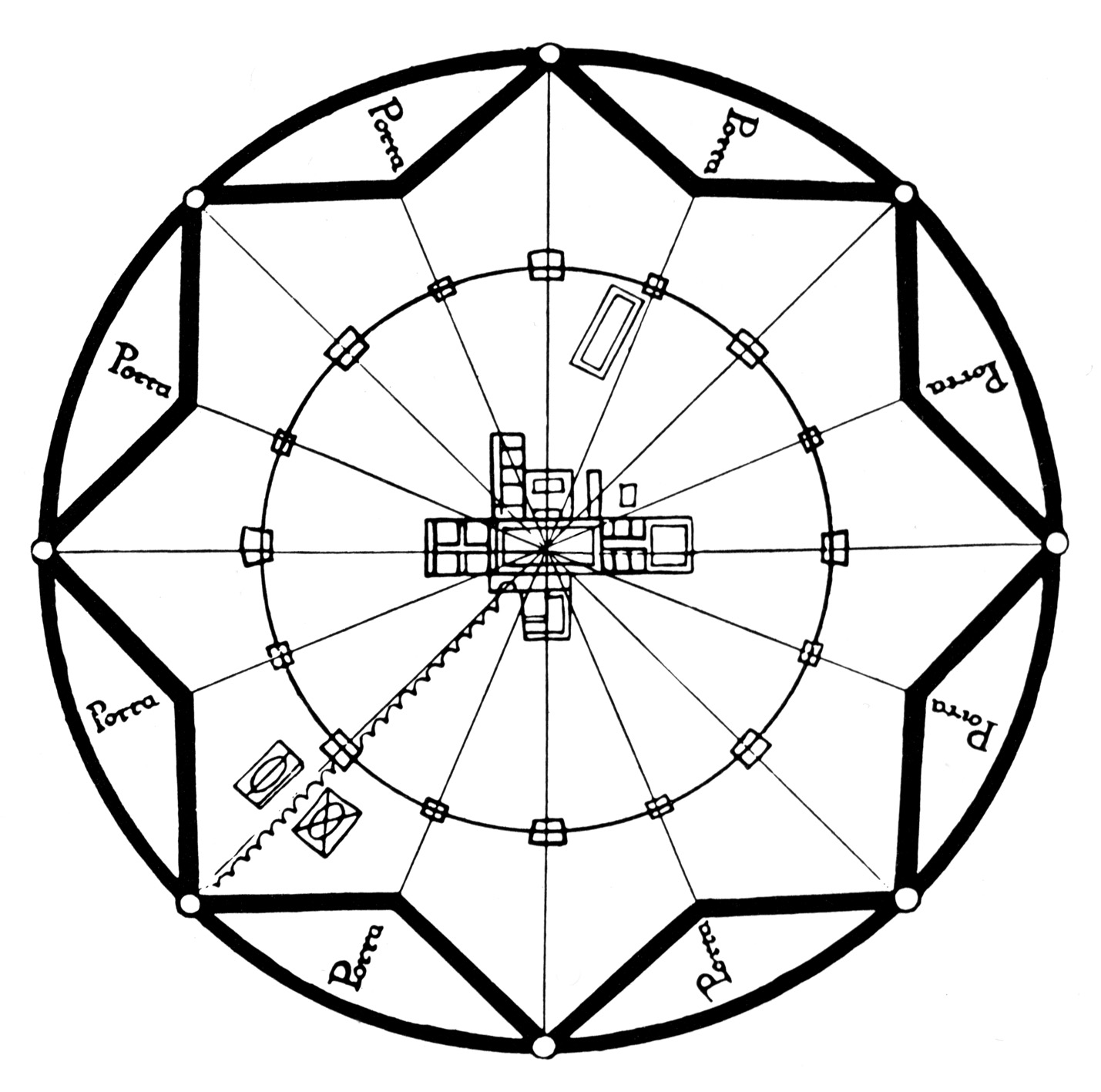
Plan of Sforzinda, Filarete, c. 1465

Examples of the ideal cities include Filarete's "Sforzinda", a description of which was included in Trattato di architettura (c. 1465). The city of Sforzinda was laid out within an eight-pointed star inscribed within a circular moat. Further examples may have been intended to have been read into the so-called "Urbino" and "Baltimore" panels (second half of the fifteenth century), which show classically influenced architecture disposed in logically planned piazzas.

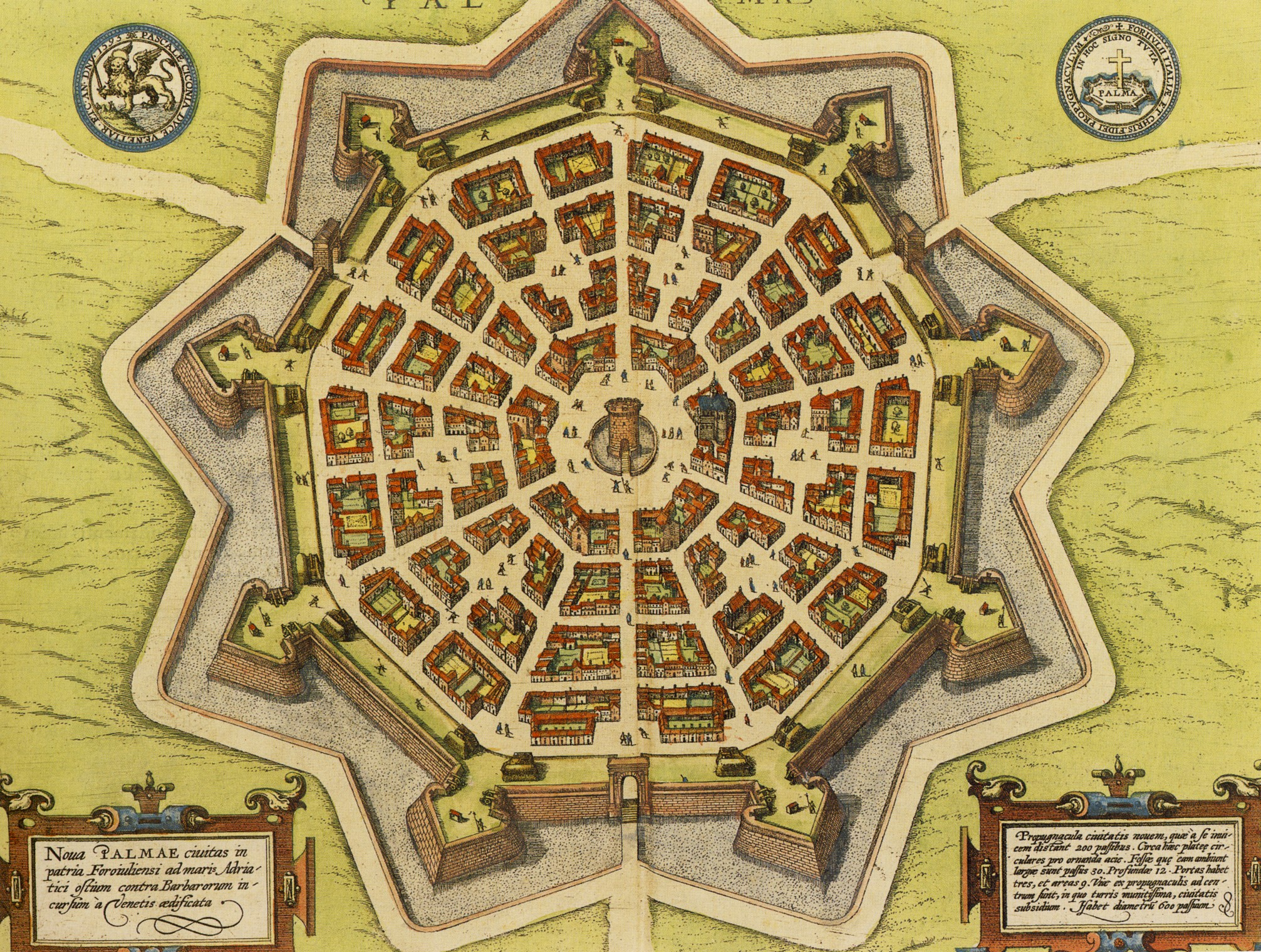
Map of Palmanova in 1593. The town is encircled by massive Venetian Defensive Systems that are a UNESCO World Heritage Site.

The cities of Palmanova and Nicosia, whose Venetian Fortresses were built in the 1590s by the Venetian Republic, are considered to be practical examples of the concept of the ideal city. Another notable example of the concept is Zamość in eastern Poland, founded in the late 16th century and modelled by the Italian architect Bernardo Morando.

James Oglethorpe synthesized Classical and Renaissance concepts of the ideal city with new Enlightenment ideals of scientific planning, harmony in design, and social equality in his plan for the Province of Georgia. The physical design component of the famous Oglethorpe Plan remains preserved in the Savannah Historic District. An example of a late Enlightenment architect producing ideal and universal city plans was Jean-Jacques Moll, who designed six plans for a city of 100,000 inhabitants in the early 19th century.

Late nineteenth-century examples of the ideal city include the garden city movement of Sir Ebenezer Howard, realised at Letchworth Garden City and Welwyn Garden City in England. Poundbury, Charles III's architectural vision established in Dorset, is among the most recent examples of ideal city planning.

Built in 1950s Communist Poland, Nowa Huta, now part of Kraków, Poland, is one of the largest planned socialist realist settlements or districts ever built and an example of social engineering. The abundance of parks in Nowa Huta make it the greenest part of Kraków.

== See also ==
- Oglethorpe Plan
- Utopia
