= Trattato di architettura =

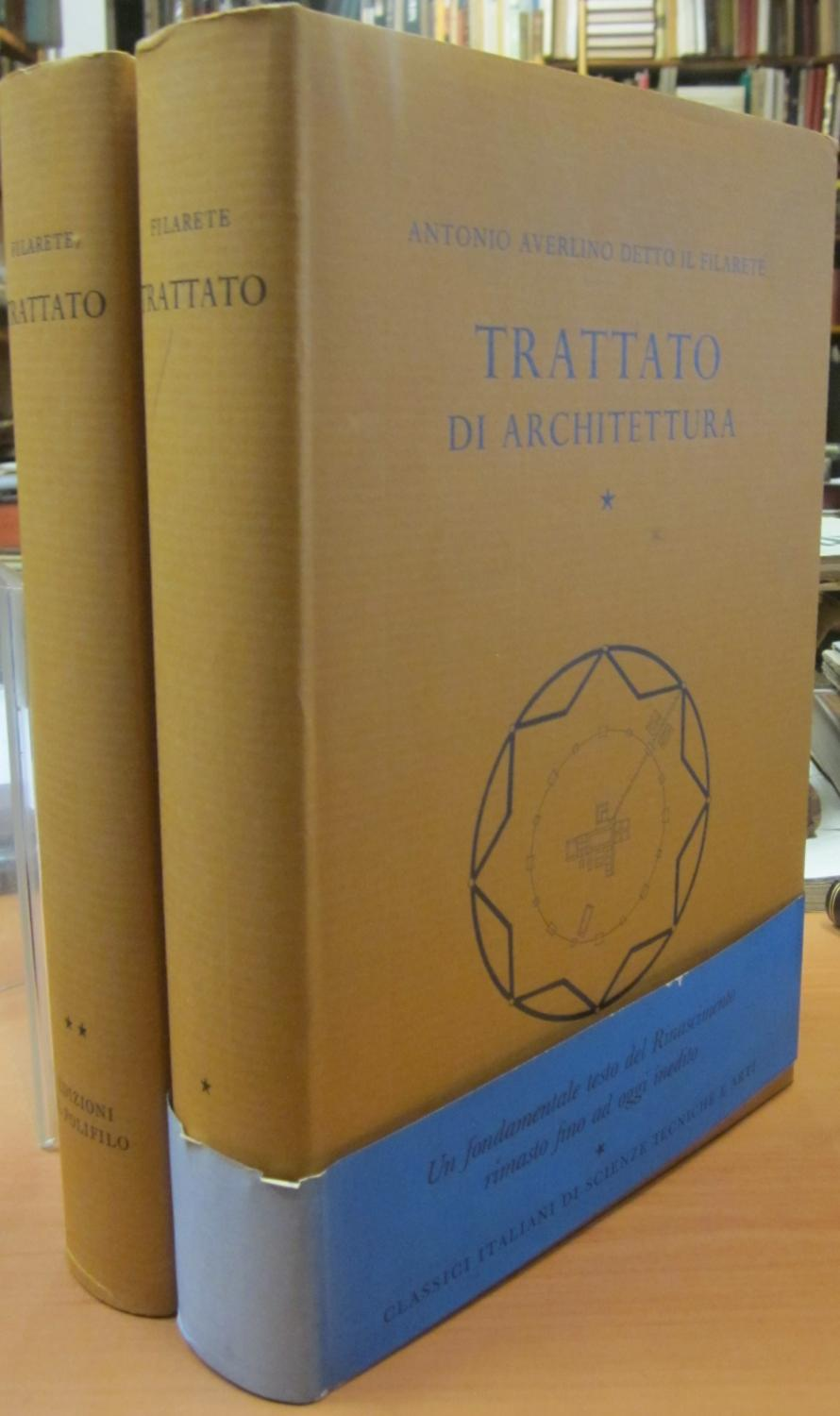
Filarete's books

Trattato di architettura is a book on architectural theory by the Florentine Renaissance architect Filarete completed c. 1464.

== Writing Process and Dedications ==
Filarete's book was dedicated to Francesco Sforza, with Filarete naming the text "Libro Architecttonico." The book contains 25 parts (each of which Filarete termed a "libro"), with most of the parts being finished during his stays in Milan. After his last stay in Milan, he turned to Florence, and during his travel he wrote the final part of his book. A dedication was expected to be made to the Medici family, and later he added another dedicatory to Piero di Cosimo de' Medici.

According to research by Giorgio Vasari, the last two additions to "Libro Architecttonico" were finished in roughly 1464, and his contemporary scholars have determined this information to be correct. For the previous 24 books, Spencer proposed the years between 1461 and 1462 for the first 21 books, later for books 22-24 on drawings, and the last one book for Medici. While Grassi Liliana thought the books would be finished during 1460 and 1461, he also thought the revision would be later, potentially in 1464.

== Overview ==
The books of Filarete were considered manuscripts for a time, split into two groups. The first group contains two sections, the first was dedicated to Francesco Sforza. The second section, dedicated to Piero di Cosimo de' Medici, is also known as "Codex Magliabechiano" and contains illustrations. The second group of content was written in Latin for Matthias Corvinus, and it was strongly influenced by the work of Vitruvius.

Filarete′s books have a narrative structure. In the books, he imagines that Francesco Sforza needs him to plan a new city, called Sforzinda. Filarete is in charge of this work and finds the "Golden Book," a mythical text about the fictional city of Plugiapolis written by an ancient king, Zogalia. The "Golden Book" gave him the idea for the new city. The central part of the Filarete′s books describe the city and the buildings inside of it. The city has the shape of an eight point star, circumscribed by a circle. The city includes three important public spaces: the palace, the market, and the cathedral. However, he did not give a concrete plan for a particular project.

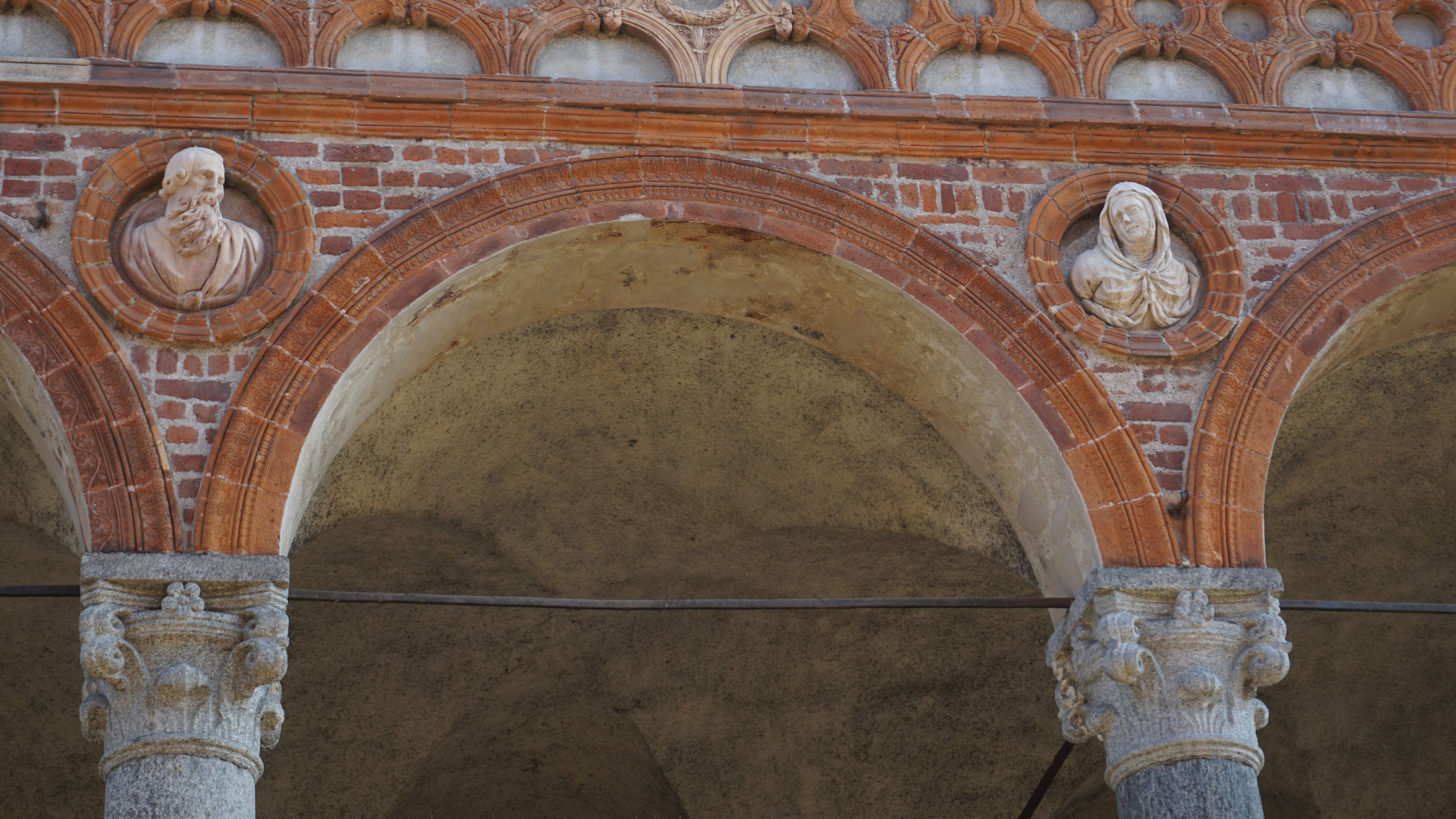
Buildings in Milan

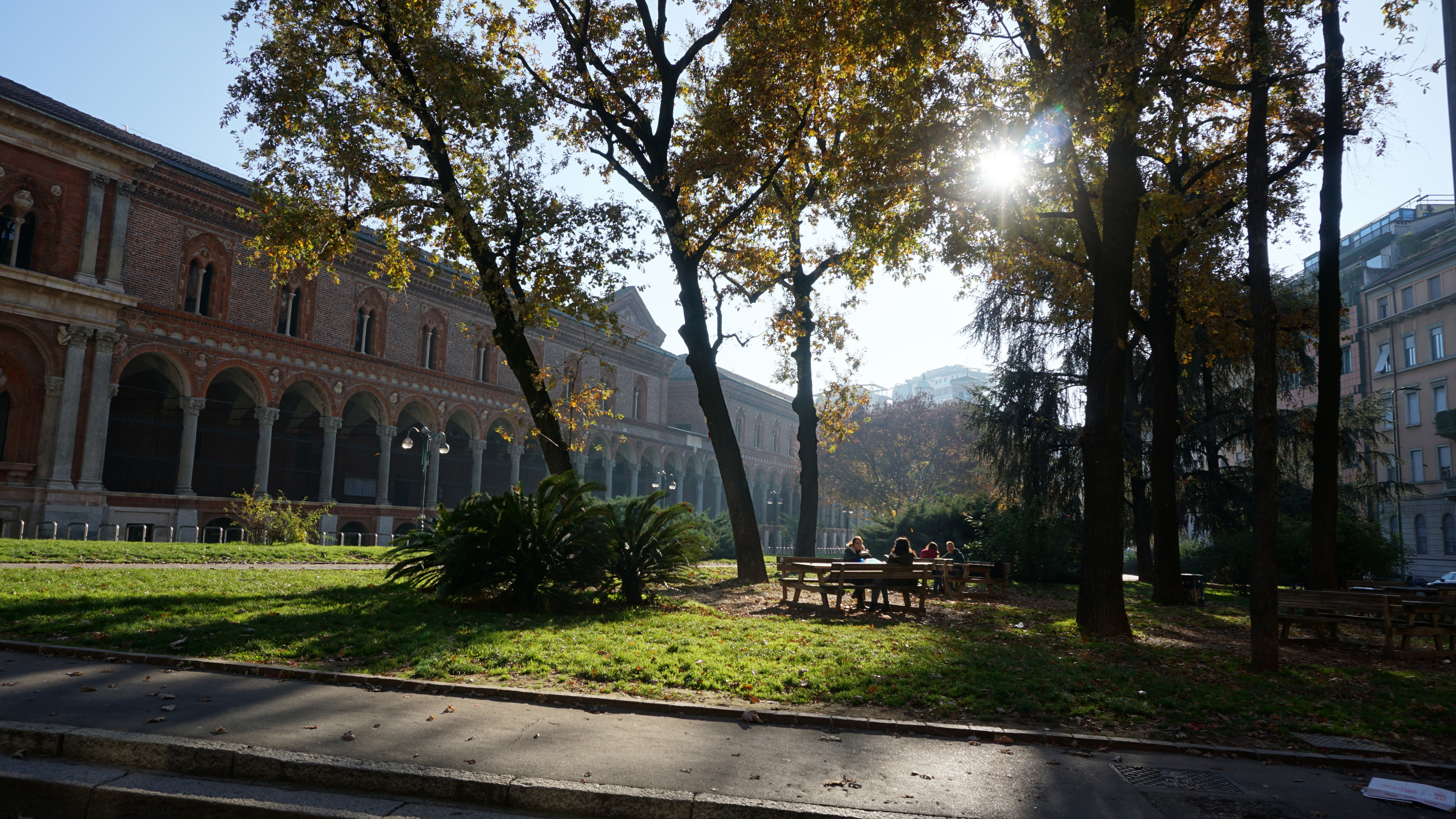
Milan city center, "Ca' Granda"

Filarete's plan was not only retained on paper. The "Ospedale Maggiore" in Milan, known as "Ca′ Granda", was built by Duke Francesco Sforza in 1456, according to Filarete's plan. However only the southern part of the building was built directly according to his design, while the latter transformation of the building was still greatly influenced by his plan and philosophy.

== Modern Study ==
In 1890 von Oettingen published the first draft of the book, and latter added an introduction by Lazzarom and Munoz in 1908. In 1963, Tigler, published his dissertation and book "Die Architecturtheorie des Filarete." Further, an English translation and a critical edition in Italian were published in 1965.

== See also ==
- Sforzinda
