= Jean-Jacques Moll =

Swiss architect (1743–1828)

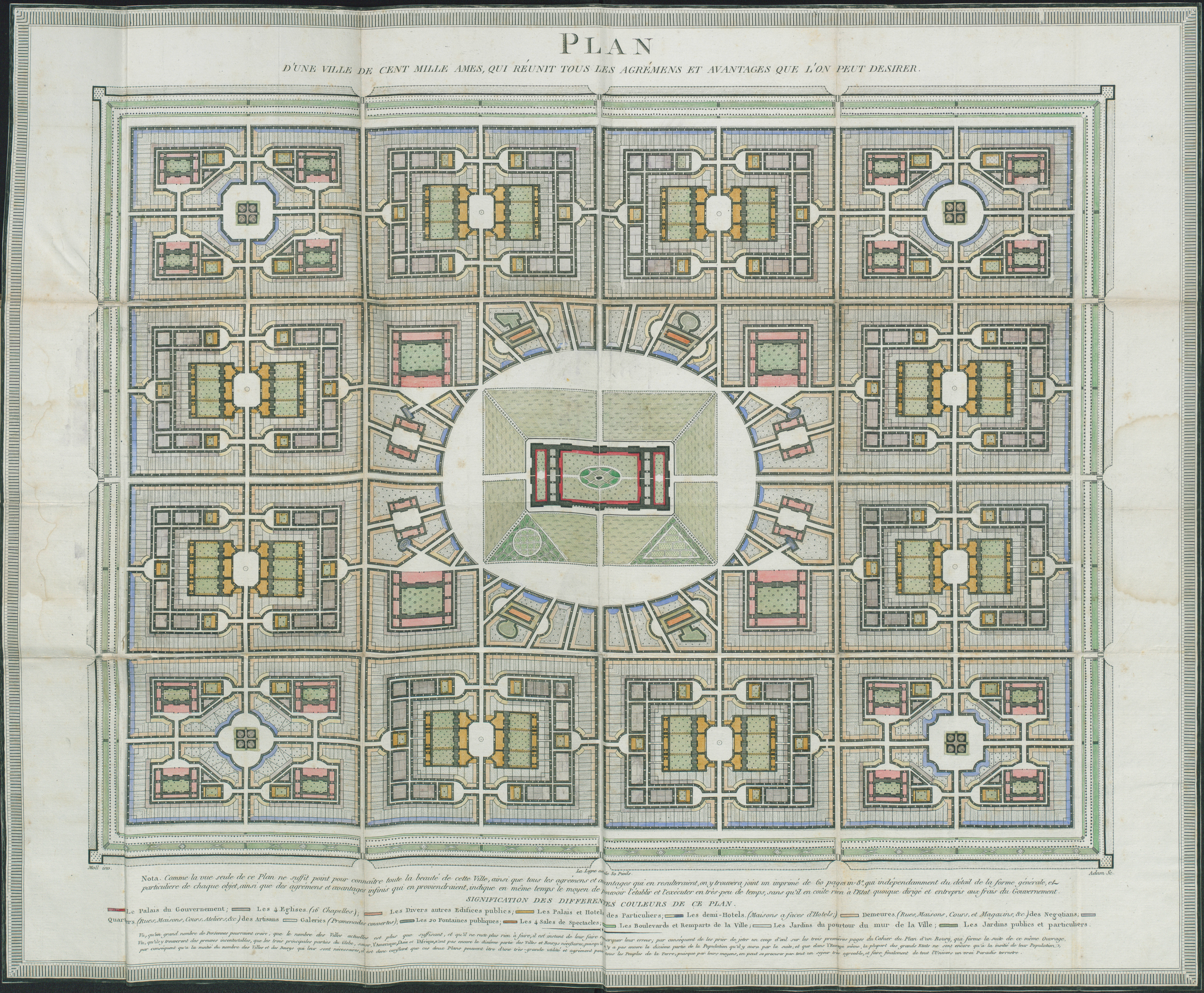
One of the plans by Jean-Jacques Moll for an ideal city for up to 100,000 inhabitants

Jean-Jacques Moll (1743–1828), also known as Johann Jakob Moll, was a Swiss architect and architectural theoretician. He is known for having designed a set of proposals for ideal cities.

He was born in Geneva, but lived and worked in Paris. In 1802, the French state announced its intention to construct a new city in Brittany named after Napoleon, Napoléonville. The initiative foundered, but prompted Moll to produce plans for six model cities, each for 100,000 inhabitants.

Moll's plans, though varied in their details, are all characterised by symmetry and a geometric approach to the city plan, with a centre dominated by a rectangular space with an inscribed ellipse, where a central, communal building in a park would dominate the city. Around it are further public buildings. The rest of the city would be divided into sixteen equal areas, where individual houses equipped with small gardens in different constellations would be built. Moll provided no scale for his plans, but emphasised that the streets should be long and wide, with large sidewalks, and several public squares with fountains.

Moll's ideal designs, aimed at creating a "terrestrial paradise", were designed to maximise comfort and rational use for their inhabitants. In designing these ideal cities, Moll was also attempting to create plans that could be applied to any relatively flat site anywhere, and he also suggested that if the French government was not interested, the plans could equally well be used for building cities in the Austrian or Russian Empires.

== Sources cited ==
- Eaton, Ruth (2001). Cités idéales. L'utopisme et l'environment (non) bâti (in French). Bibliothèque des Amis du Fonds Mercator. ISBN 90-6153-4747.
- Feuerstein, Günther (2008). Urban Fiction. Strolling through Ideal Cities from Antiquity to the Present Day. Stuttgart/London: Edition Axel Menges. ISBN 978-3-930698-26-4.
