= Antonio Alberti =

Italian painter

Antonio Alberti was an Italian painter, active mainly in the 15th century in his native city of Ferrara, as well as Bologna and Urbino.

== Biography ==
He painted portraits and sacred subjects. For the sacristy of the church of San Bernardino, outside Urbino, he painted a Madonna and Child enthroned (1439). He painted frescoes in the Bolognini chapel at San Petronio Basilica in Bologna, consisting of incidents from the Passion, Paradise, and Inferno . He painted frescoes of the Virgin and child between saints Benedict and Sebastian (1433) for the inner choir of Sant' Antonio Abate in Ferrara. He had a son of the same name, who was also an artist, living in 1550. Onofrio Gabrieli and Fra Carnovale were his pupils. His grandson was Timoteo della Vite.

== Gallery ==
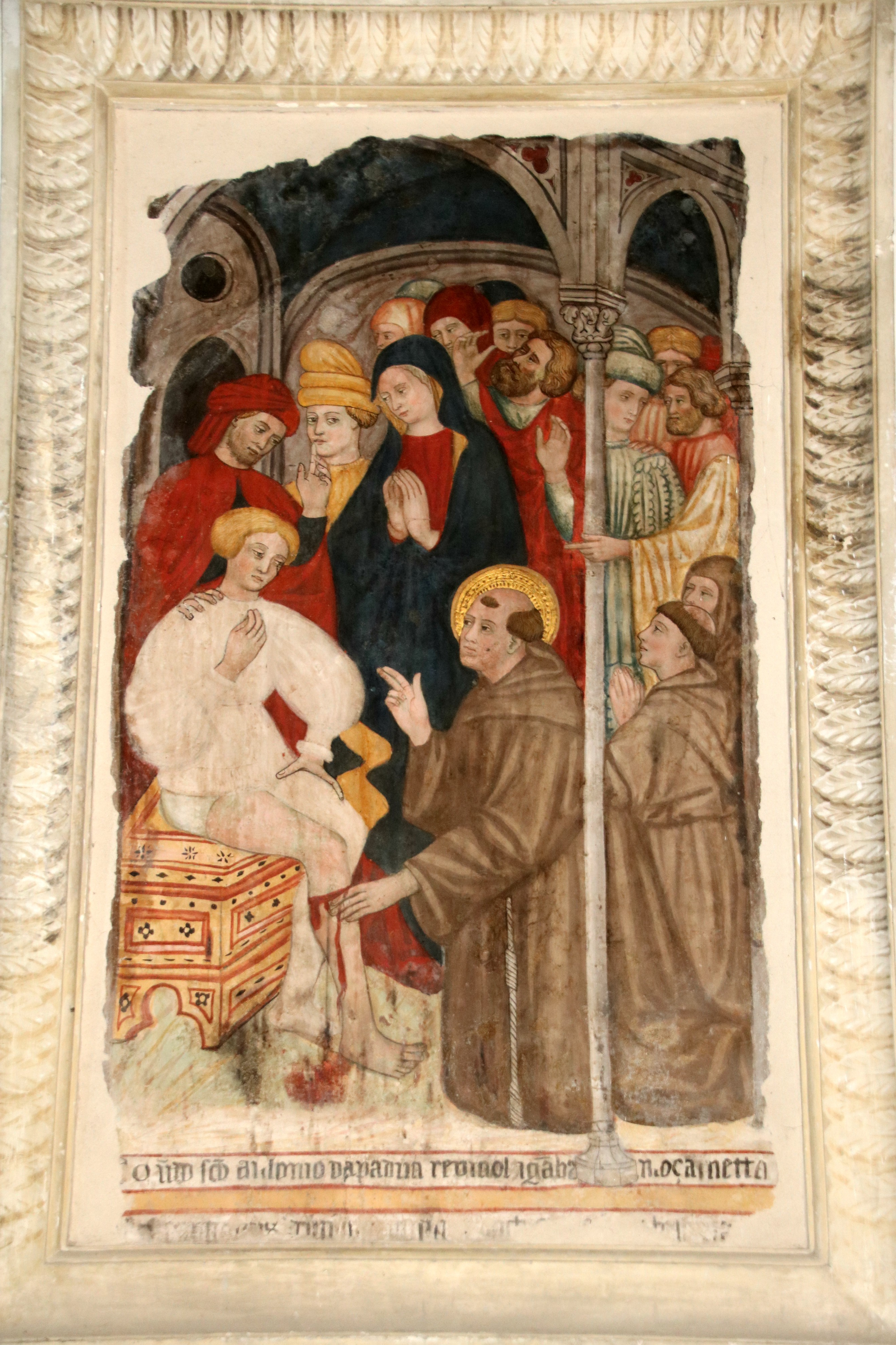
Miracle of Saint Anthony (before 1438)

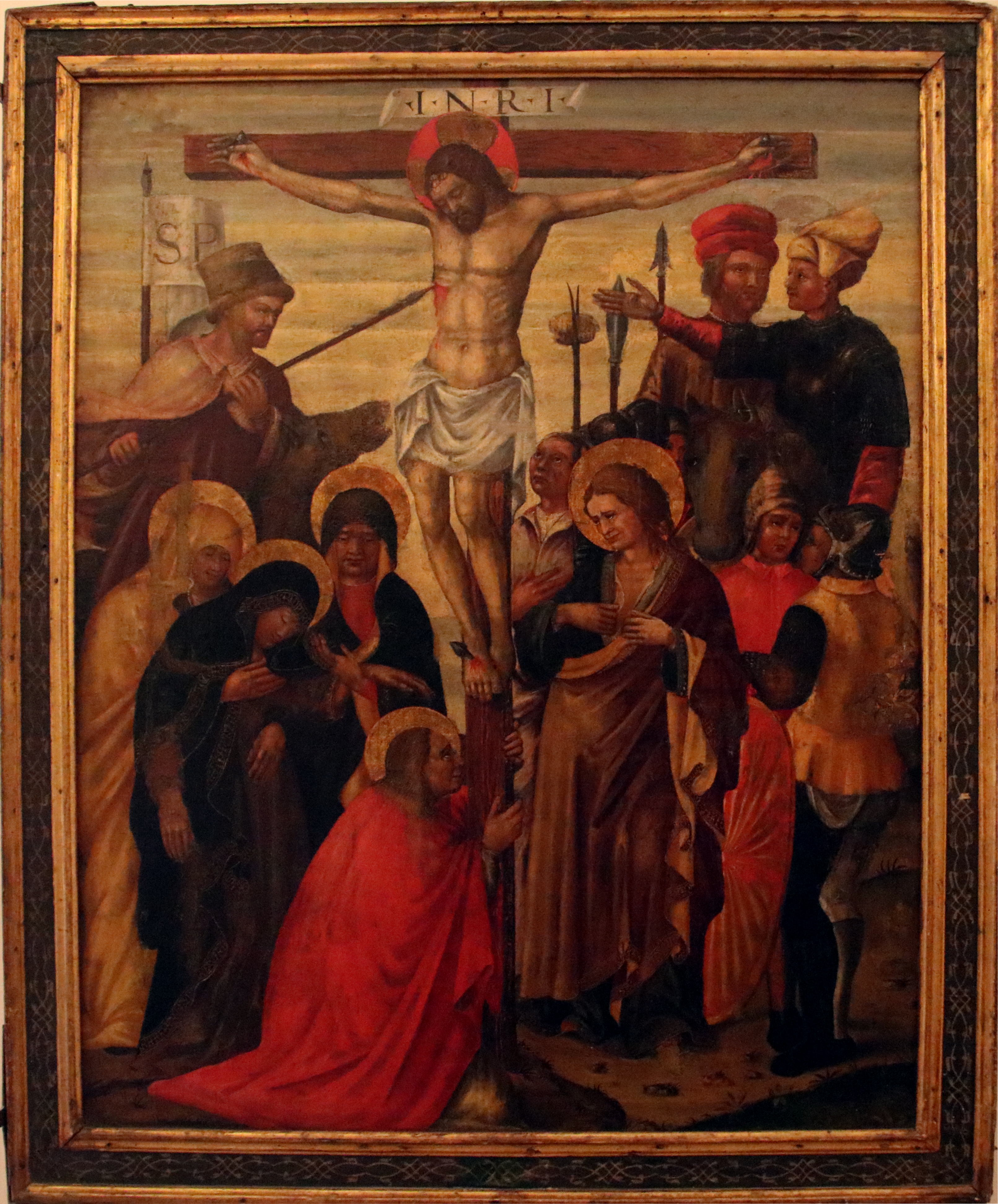
Crocifissione (Crucifixion)

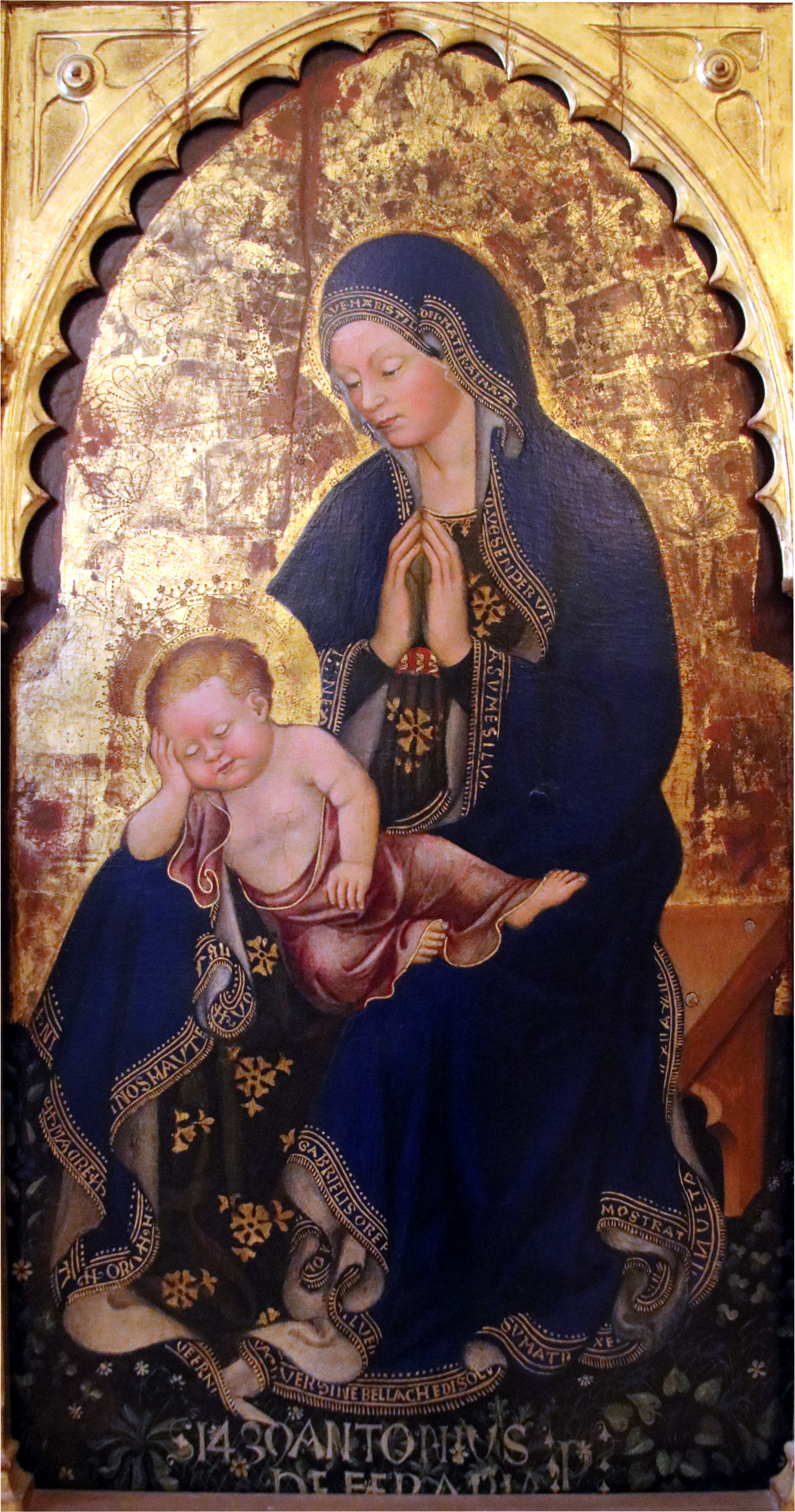
Madonna and Child among the Saints (1439)

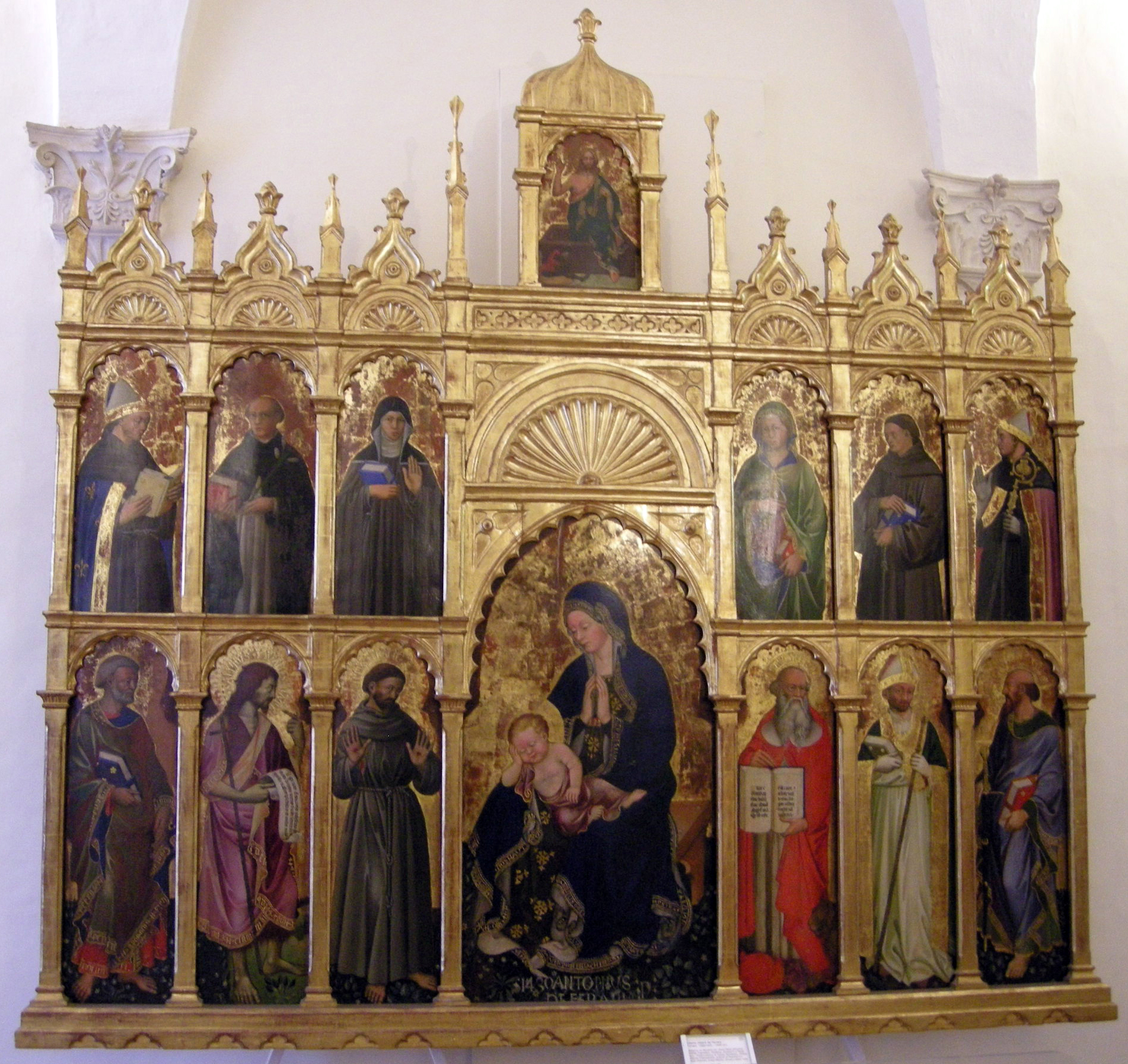
Polyptych of Madonna and Child with Saints

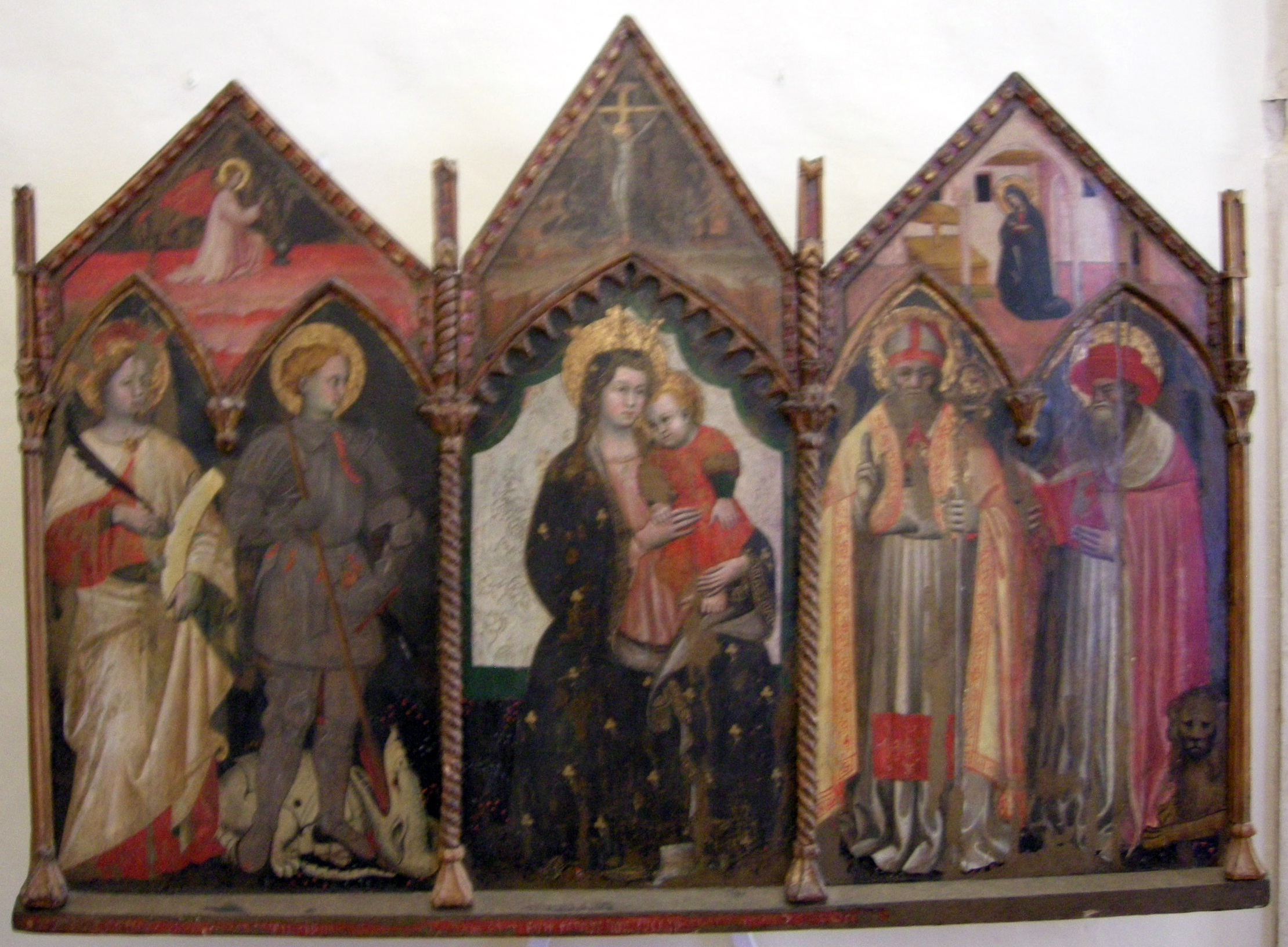
Triptych of Madonna and Child with Saints
