= Onofrio Gabrielli =

Italian painter (1619–1706)

Onofrio Gabrieli or Gabriello (2 April 1619 – 26 September 1706) was an Italian painter of the Baroque period.

== Biography ==
He was born in Gesso, near Messina, and had his initial studies in Messina under Antonio Alberti, who was nicknamed Barbalonga. He then moved to Rome, where he worked in the studios of Nicolas Poussin and Pietro da Cortona. In 1641, he travelled to the Veneto (mainly Venice and Padua) to work with Domenico Maroli, established relationships with the Borromeo family in Padua and returned, in 1650, to Messina. In 1678, he fled the city after participating in the Messina rebellion against the Spanish authorities, seeking refuge initially in France and then in Padua, Mantua, and Ancona. Pardoned, he returned to Messina in 1701. He died in 1706 in Gesso.

Many of his paintings in Messina were destroyed by the earthquakes of 1783 and 1908. Only his Madonna del Soccorso remains presently in the Museo Regionale. In Milazzo, he painted in the churches of San Giuseppe and San Papino. Other paintings by Onofrio Gabrieli are in the following Sicilian towns: Siracusa, Randazzo, Monforte San Giorgio, Contesse, and Gesso. He painted an altarpiece of the Virgin with child, Saints Clare, John the Evangelist, and Nicolò (1695), for the church of Santa Chiara in Montelupone nelle Marche. He also frescoed biblical themes for the villa Borromeo in Padua. Other paintings with biblical themes are in the church in Montagnana and in the church of Santa Maria del Carmine in Padua.

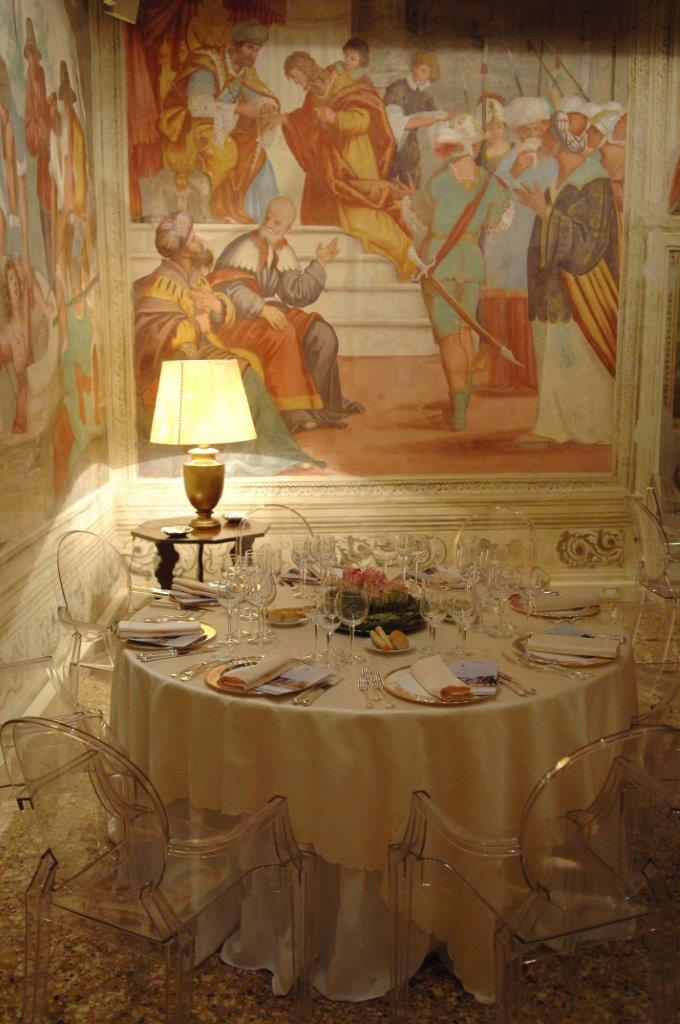
Gabrieli's frescoes from Villa Borromeo (Padova)

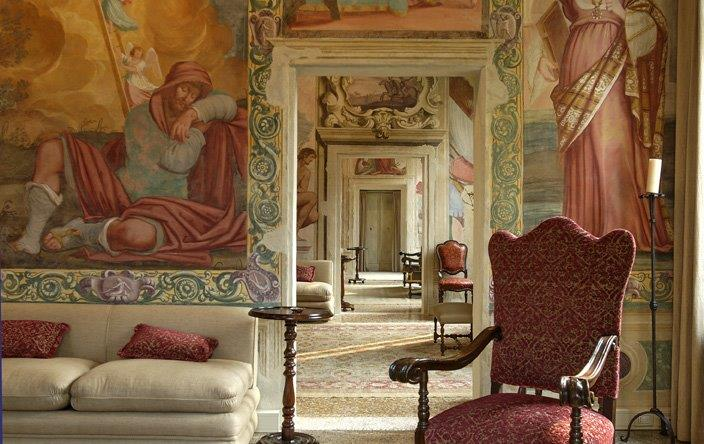
Gabrieli's frescoes: on the left, Jacob sleeping and dreaming the ladder of angels

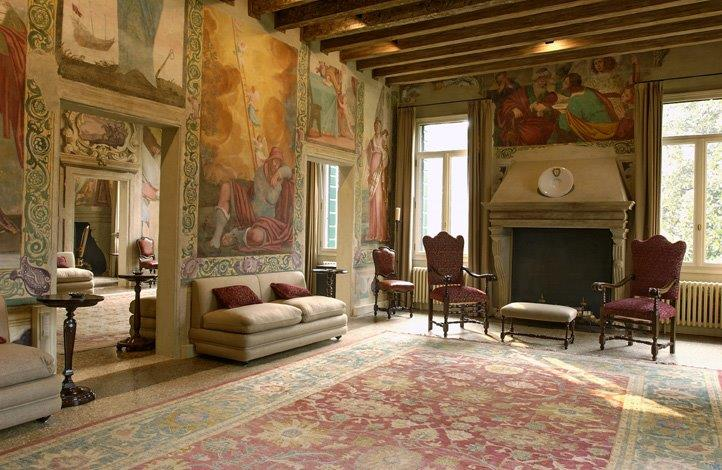
Gabrieli's frescoes in the main room of Villa Borromeo (Padua)
