= The Ideal City (painting) =

Three Italian Renaissance paintings

The Ideal City (Italian: La città ideale) is the title given to three strikingly similar Italian Renaissance paintings of unresolved attribution, each associated with the contemporaneous concept of the ideal city. Being kept at three different places they are most commonly referred to by their location: The Ideal city of Urbino, Baltimore, and Berlin. Hubert Damisch, who has written at length about the paintings, refers to them as the "Urbino perspectives" or "panels". The three paintings are dated to the late 15th century and most probably they have different authors but various attributions have been advanced for each without any consensus. There is also a discussion about the purpose of the paintings as they are all in an unusual elongated format (approx. 2.0 x 0.7m). In 2012 the Baltimore and Urbino panels were shown at a joint exhibition, with the Berlin painting being represented by a copy, as the original is too fragile to be shipped abroad.

== The Ideal City of Baltimore ==
The Ideal City
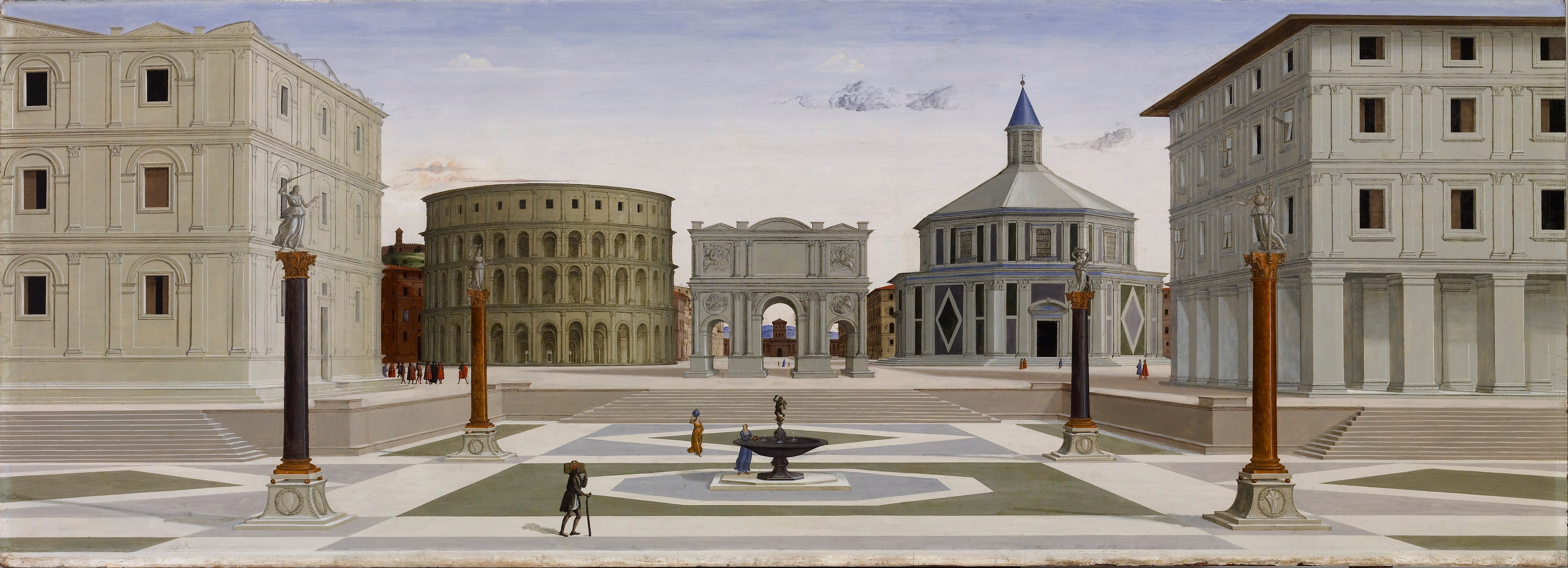
- Artist: Attributed to Fra Carnevale
- Year: between c. 1480 and c. 1484
- Type: oil and tempera on panel
- Dimensions: 77.4 cm × 220. cm (30.5 in × 86.6 in)
- Location: The Walters Art Museum, Baltimore

The Ideal City stored in Baltimore (Walters Art Museum) is a 15th-century painting usually attributed to the architect and artist Fra Carnevale. The painting was most likely executed for the Ducal Palace, Urbino of Federico da Montefeltro, duke of Urbino. There is no indisputable evidence for this, but Carnevale was one of three architects used for renovations to the palace. Furthermore, in an inventory of the palace completed in 1599 there is mention of a "long rectangular painting depicting an antique but beautiful perspective from the hand of Carnavale". The panels might have been spalliere, forming part of a decorative scheme set into the wainscoting or furnishings, a style common in Italy in the late 15th century.

However, the painting is attributed by others to Francesco di Giorgio Martini, partly due to the latter's greater significance at the Urbino court and because the painting refers to architectural themes he refers to, derived from Leon Battista Alberti's slightly earlier published treatise, in his own architectural treatise.

=== Composition ===
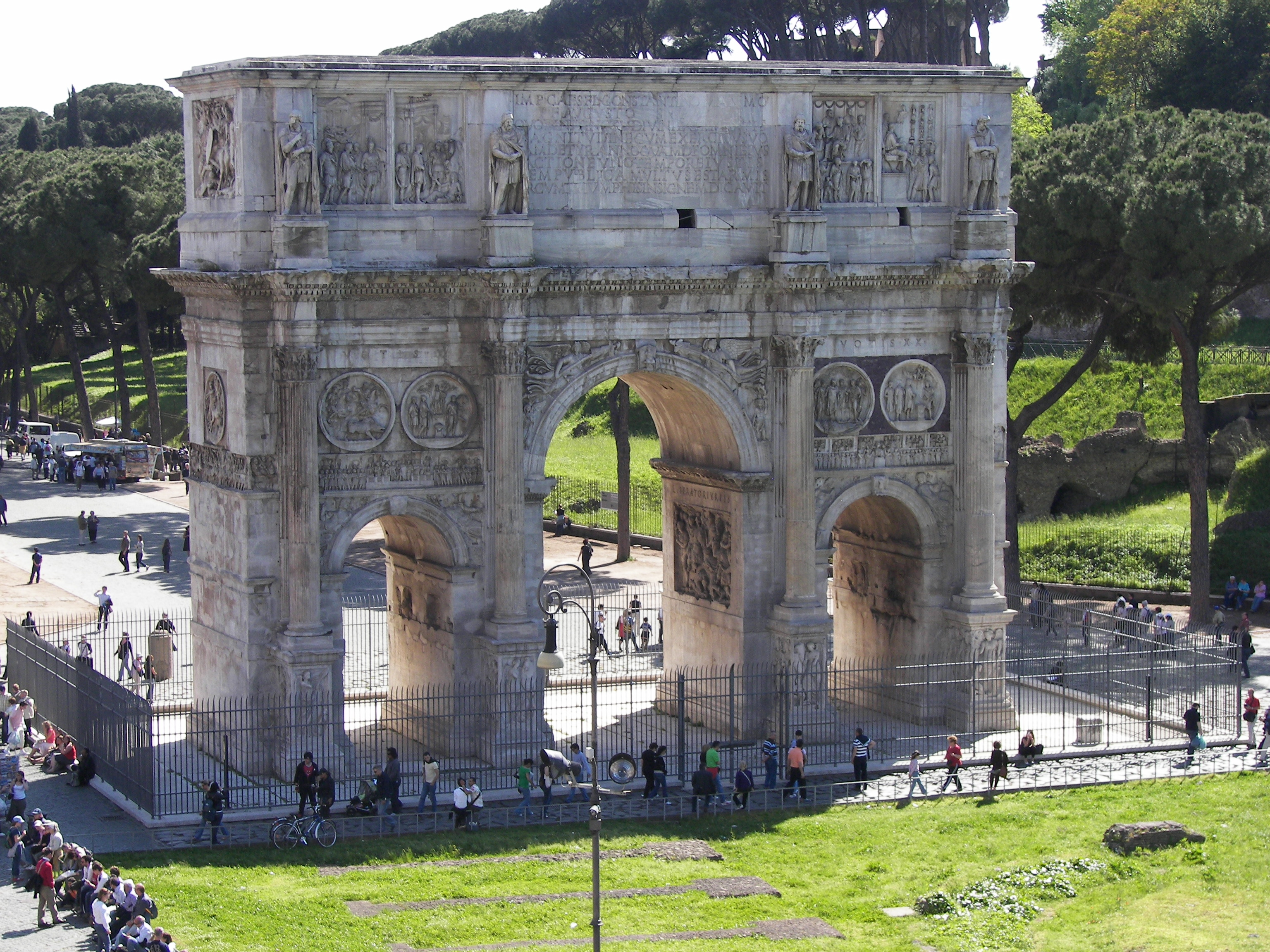
The Arch of Constantine, Rome

The painting consists of a city landscape, glowing in the morning light, nearly empty of human activity. There are five structures that define the space. At the center is a Roman triumphal arch, reminiscent of the Arch of Constantine in Rome, the prominent position of which speaks to the importance of military leadership. Federico was a leading military commander of his day, but the place on the arch for dedication has been left blank. The amphitheater is modeled after the Colosseum in Rome, and could represent the importance of providing entertainment for the well-being of the people. The octagonal building is the only structure not specifically Roman, being modeled after the Baptistery in Florence. However, there is an argument that the original structure incorporated a Roman temple. These ancient structures are joined by two modern buildings of the time. The one on the left, modeled after mid-15th century Florentine palaces of the Medici family, is representative of a residence appropriate to the ruling class. The building to the right with the arches and cloth covered screens is also thought to be a residence. Visible in the background are other 15th-century buildings, including a warehouse. In the foreground, there are four allegorical sculptures, each representing the personification of virtue: Justice with her scales, Moderation with a pitcher of water to mix with wine, Liberality with a cornucopia, and Courage with a column. The fountain at the center, featuring a bronzed winged Sprite, represents a functional source of water. Providing patrons with good water was a sign of magnanimity.

=== Analysis ===
The Ideal City celebrates the values in a well-ordered society, with architecture standing as a metaphor for good government. The illusion of space is achieved using a mathematical perspective system developed in Florence. The receding lines that establish spatial relationships converge at a central point, located in the middle of the city gate.

=== In popular culture ===
In a scene from the 1995 thriller, Twelve Monkeys, Bruce Willis' character looks at The Ideal City in the Walters Art Museum.

=== Off the Wall ===
A reproduction of The Ideal City was displayed at Hopkins Plaza, Baltimore, during Off the Wall, an open-air exhibition on the streets of the city from November 2012 through April 2013. A reproduction of the painting was displayed at Hopkins Plaza. The National Gallery in London began the concept of bringing art out of doors in 2007 and the Detroit Institute of Art introduced the concept in the US. The Off the Wall reproductions of the Walters' paintings were done on weather-resistant vinyl and included a description of the painting and a QR code for smartphones.

== The Ideal City of Urbino ==
The Ideal City
- Artist: Attributed to Luciano Laurana or Melozzo da Forlì
- Type: oil and tempera on panel
- Location: Galleria Nazionale delle Marche, Urbino

The Ideal City stored in Urbino (Galleria Nazionale delle Marche) was formerly attributed to Piero della Francesca, then to Luciano Laurana, Francesco di Giorgio Martini or Melozzo da Forlì. It shows a religious central-plan building in the middle of a square. The center of its door is the vanishing point of the painting. Behind this building to the right is probably another religious building: a basilica. The left and right of the square is limited by richly decorated Italian-style palazzi.

The Ideal City of Urbino is one of the paintings available to buy virtually inside the video game Assassin's Creed 2.

== Architectural Veduta of Berlin ==
The Ideal City
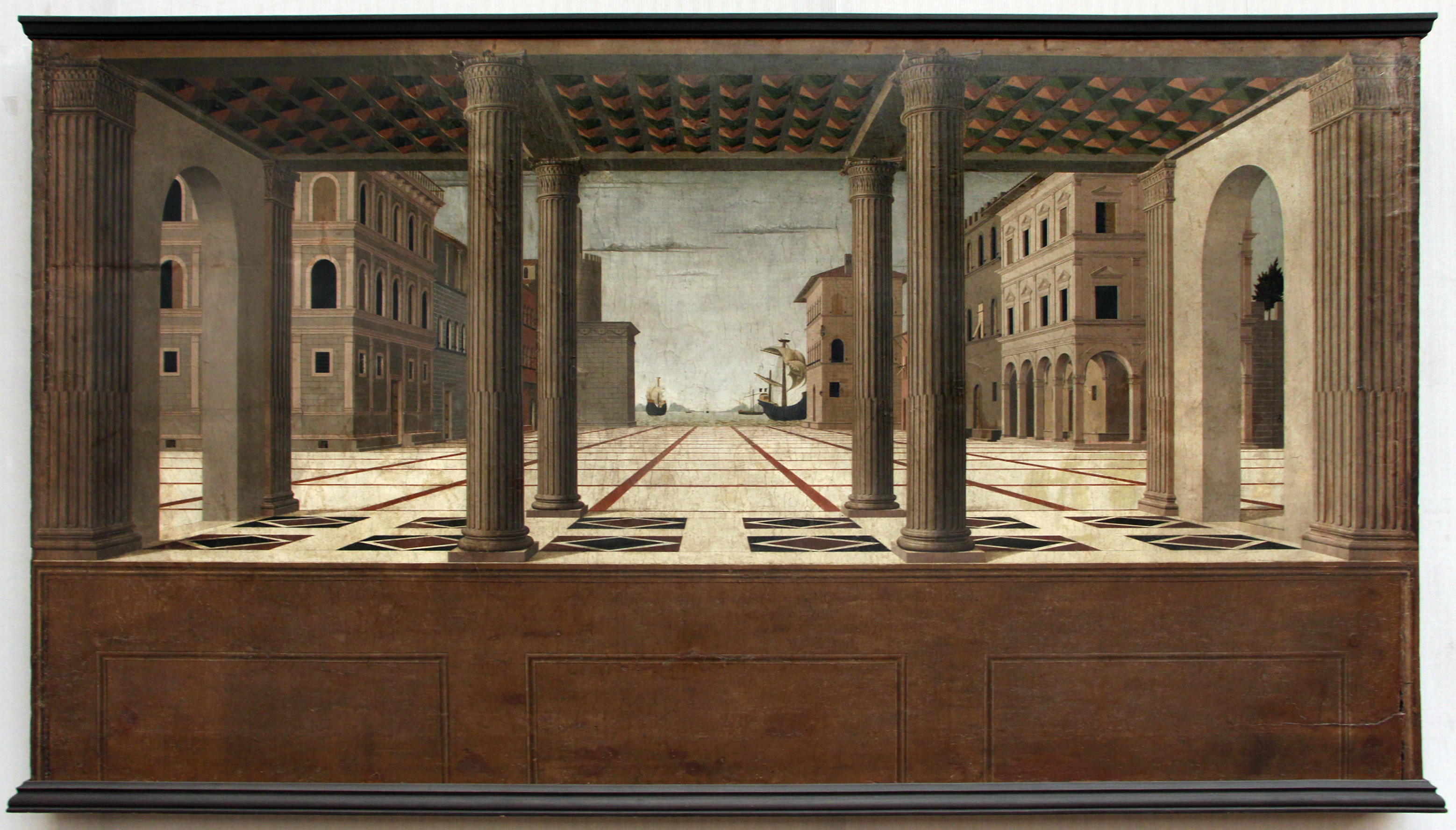
- Artist: Attributed to Francesco di Giorgio Martini or Paolo Uccello
- Year: between c. 1490 and c. 1500
- Type: oil and tempera on panel
- Location: Gemäldegalerie Berlin, Berlin

The Architectural Veduta stored in Gemäldegalerie Berlin had been attributed tentatively to Francesco di Giorgio Martini and dated eventually as 1490. There are also indications that it may have been painted by Paolo Uccello. Today the museum states the artist as unknown due to missing evidence. It has also decided for a more neutral title. Like the Urbino painting, it depicts no human beings and therefore represents a cold city atmosphere. Details of the left side of the painting show silhouettes of people, who were probably overpainted afterwards.

== See also ==
- Renaissance in Urbino

== Bibliography ==
- Alessandro Marchi (Publisher): La città ideale : l'utopia del Rinascimento a Urbino tra Piero della Francesca e Raffaello; [Urbino, Galleria Nazionale delle Marche, 6 aprile - 8 luglio 2012], Exposition Catalogue, Milan 2012, ISBN 978-8-8370-8993-1.
- Claus Pelling: Die Città ideale der Berliner Gemäldegalerie. Ein Gemälde von Paolo Uccello? Rahden 2020, ISBN 978-3-86757-087-9; includes an English translation.
