= Filarete =

Italian architect and sculptor (1400–1469)

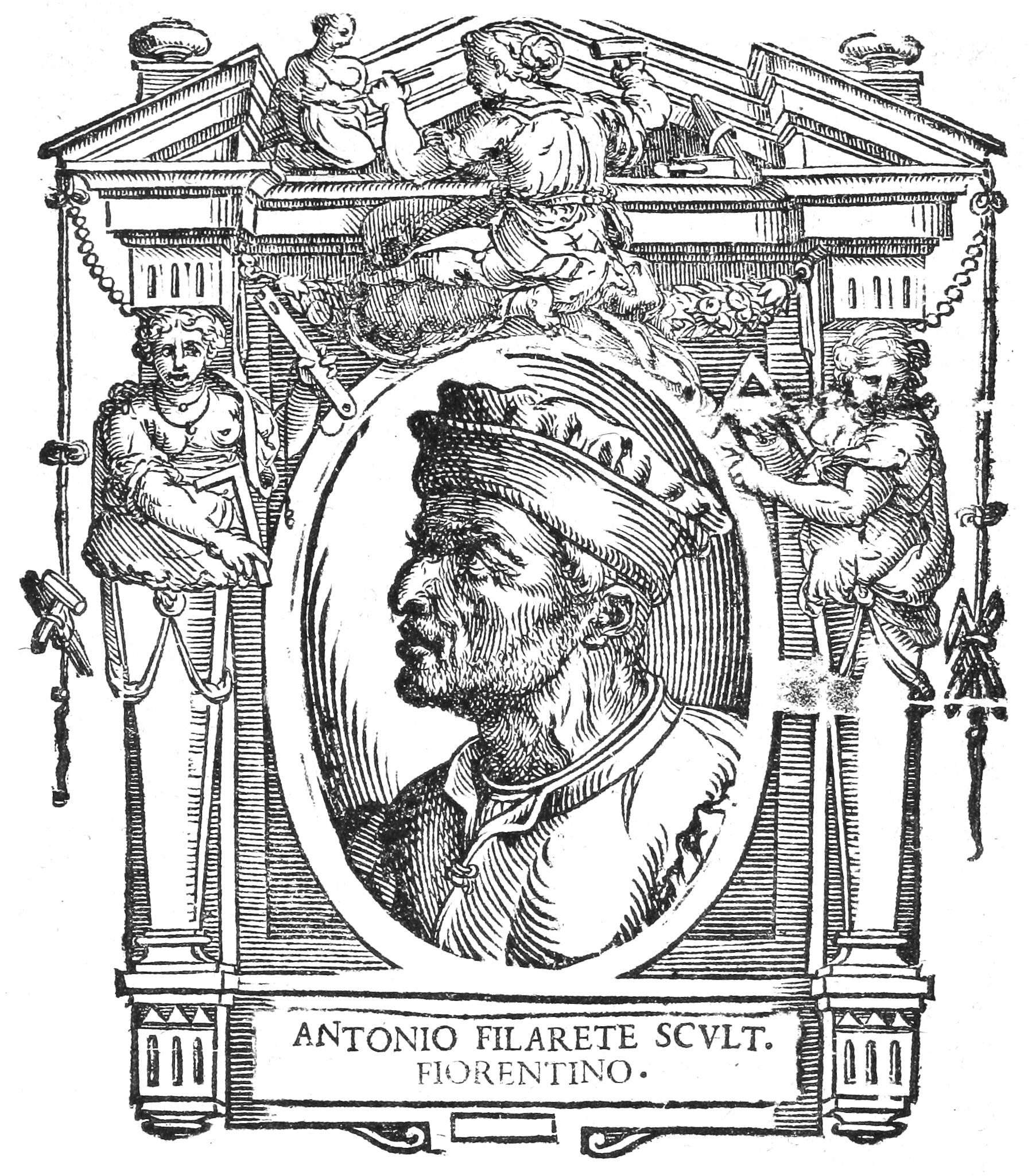

Antonio di Pietro Aver(u)lino (Italian pronunciation: [anˈtɔːnjo di ˈpjɛːtro aver(u)ˈliːno]; c. 1400 – c. 1469), known as Filarete (Italian: [filaˈrɛːte]; from Ancient Greek: φιλάρετος, meaning "lover of excellence"), was a Florentine Renaissance architect, sculptor, medallist, and architectural theorist. He is perhaps best remembered for his design of the ideal city of Sforzinda, the first ideal city plan of the Renaissance.

== Biography ==
Antonio di Pietro Averlino was born c. 1400 in Florence where he probably trained as a craftsman. Sources suggest that he worked in Florence under the Italian painter, architect, and biographer Lorenzo Ghiberti, who gave him his more famous name “Filarete” which means “a lover of virtue”. In the mid 15th century, Filarete was expelled from Rome after being accused of attempting to steal the head of John the Baptist and he moved to Venice and then eventually to Milan. There he became a ducal engineer and worked on a variety of architectural projects for the next fifteen years. According to his biographer, Vasari, Filarete died in Rome c. 1469.

== Works ==
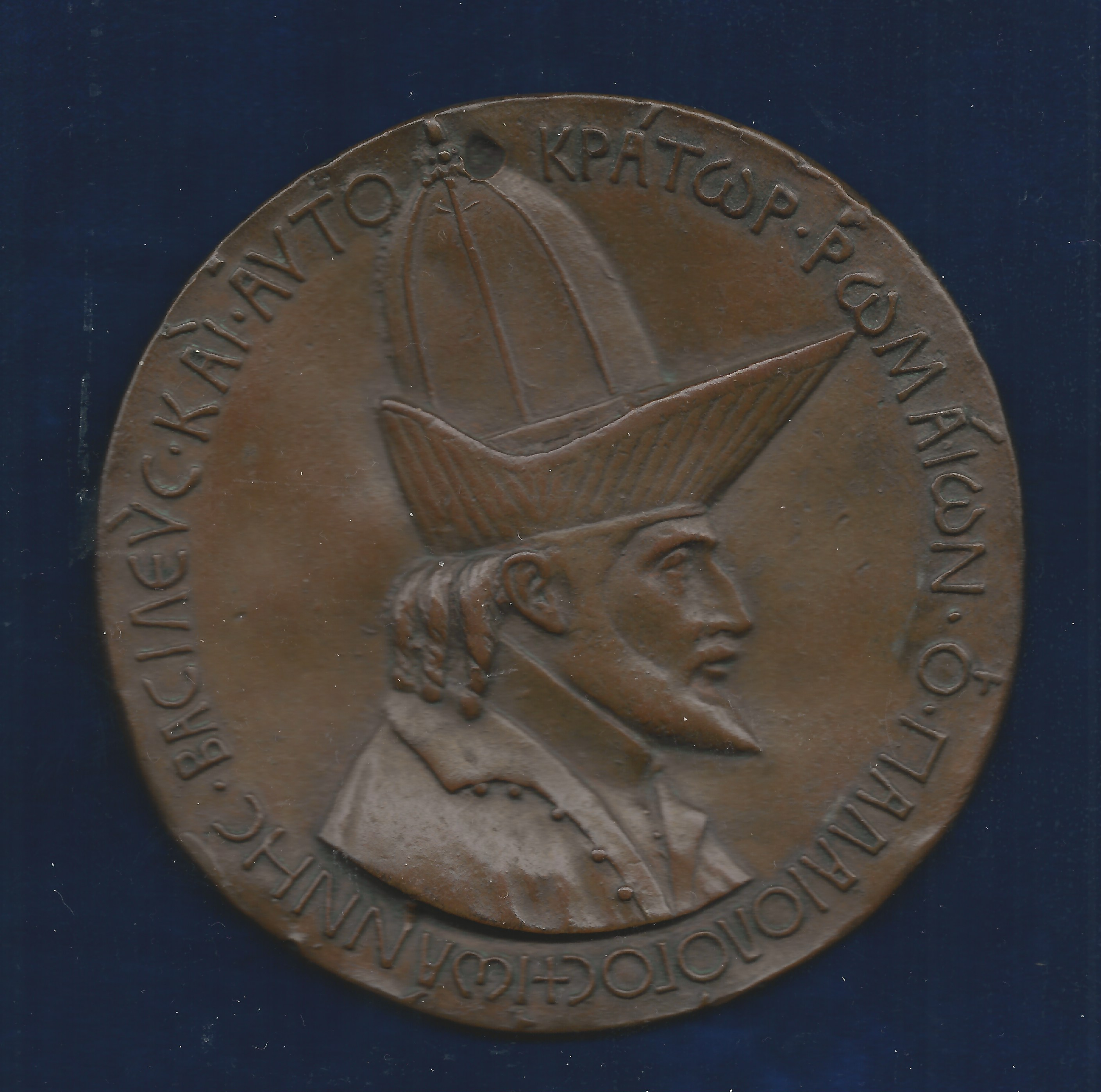
Copy by Filarete (Electrotype) of Pisanello's medal marking the 1439 visit to Florence of John VIII Palaiologos, Byzantine Emperor, 1425 to 1448

=== Bronze doors of Old St. Peter's Basilica ===
A commission granted by Pope Eugene IV meant that Filarete, over the course of twelve years, cast the bronze central doors for Old St. Peter's Basilica in Rome, which were completed in 1445. Although they were created during the Renaissance, the doors have distinct Byzantine influences and seem tied to the Medieval era. Some critics have noted that the doors offer a glimpse into the mind of Filarete, claiming that they show his “mind of medieval complexity crammed full of exciting but not quite assimilated classical learning”.

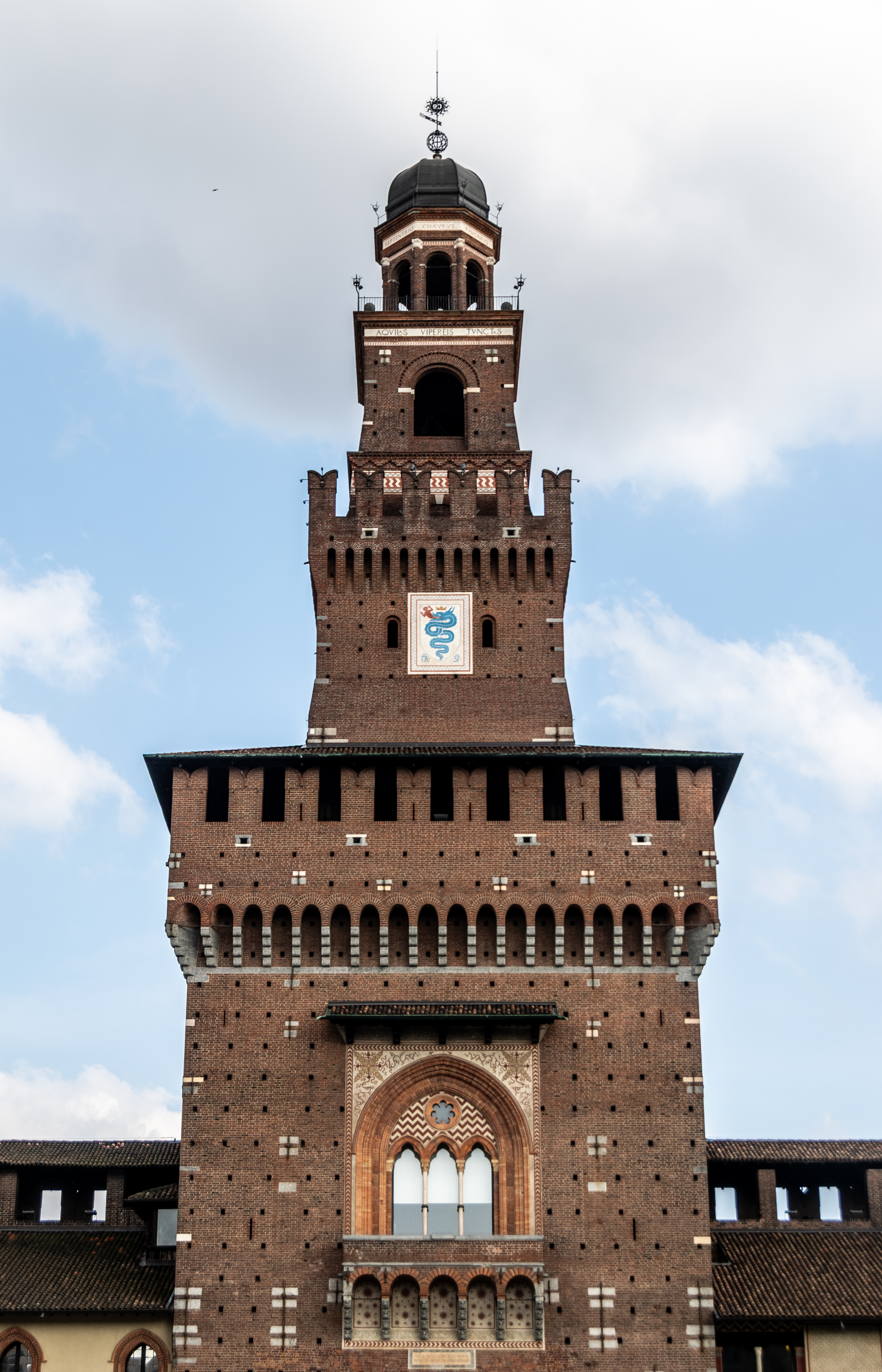
North-facing façade of the Filarete Tower (Torre del Filarete), Sforza Castle, Milan

=== Architectural works ===
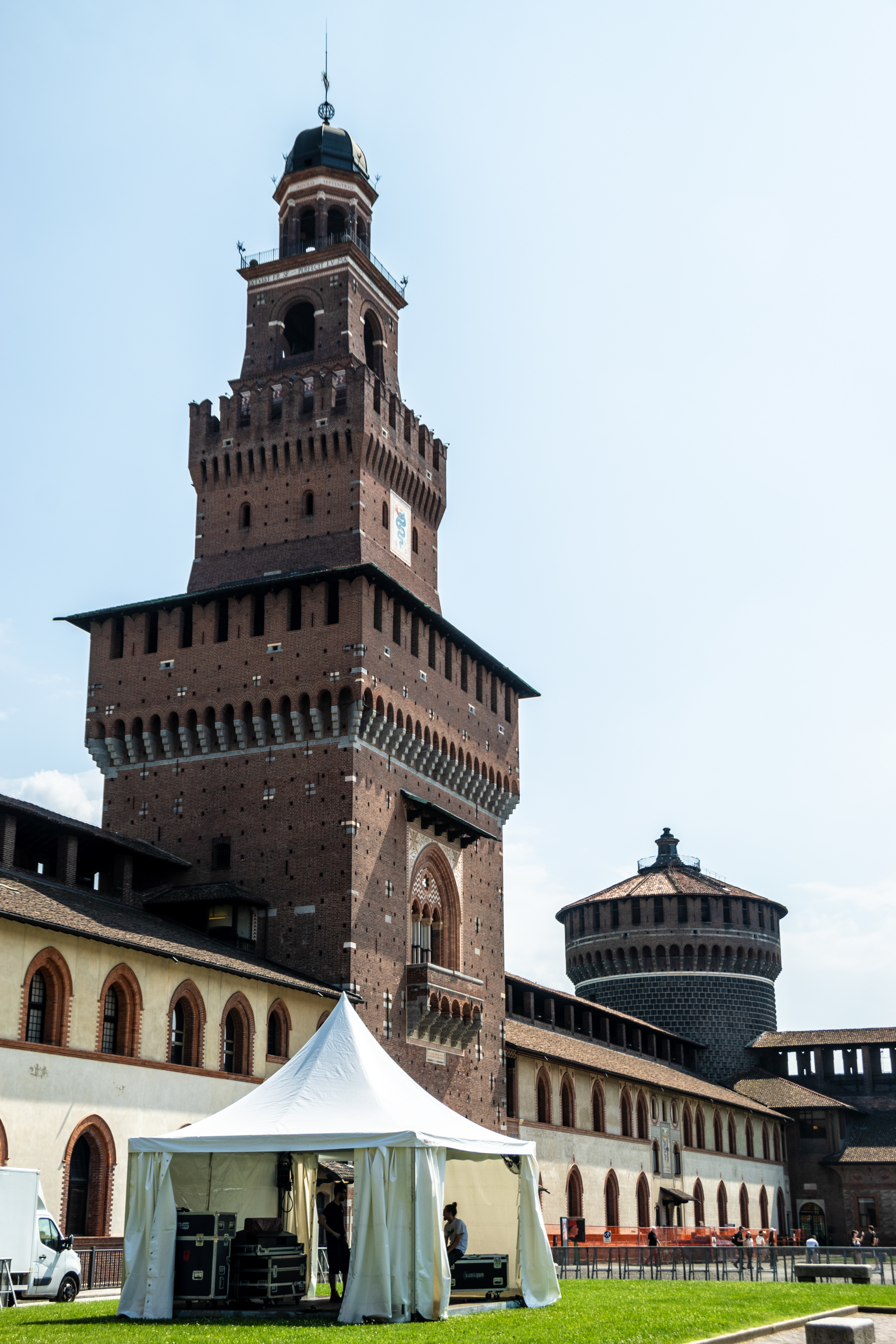
Sforza Castle in Milan

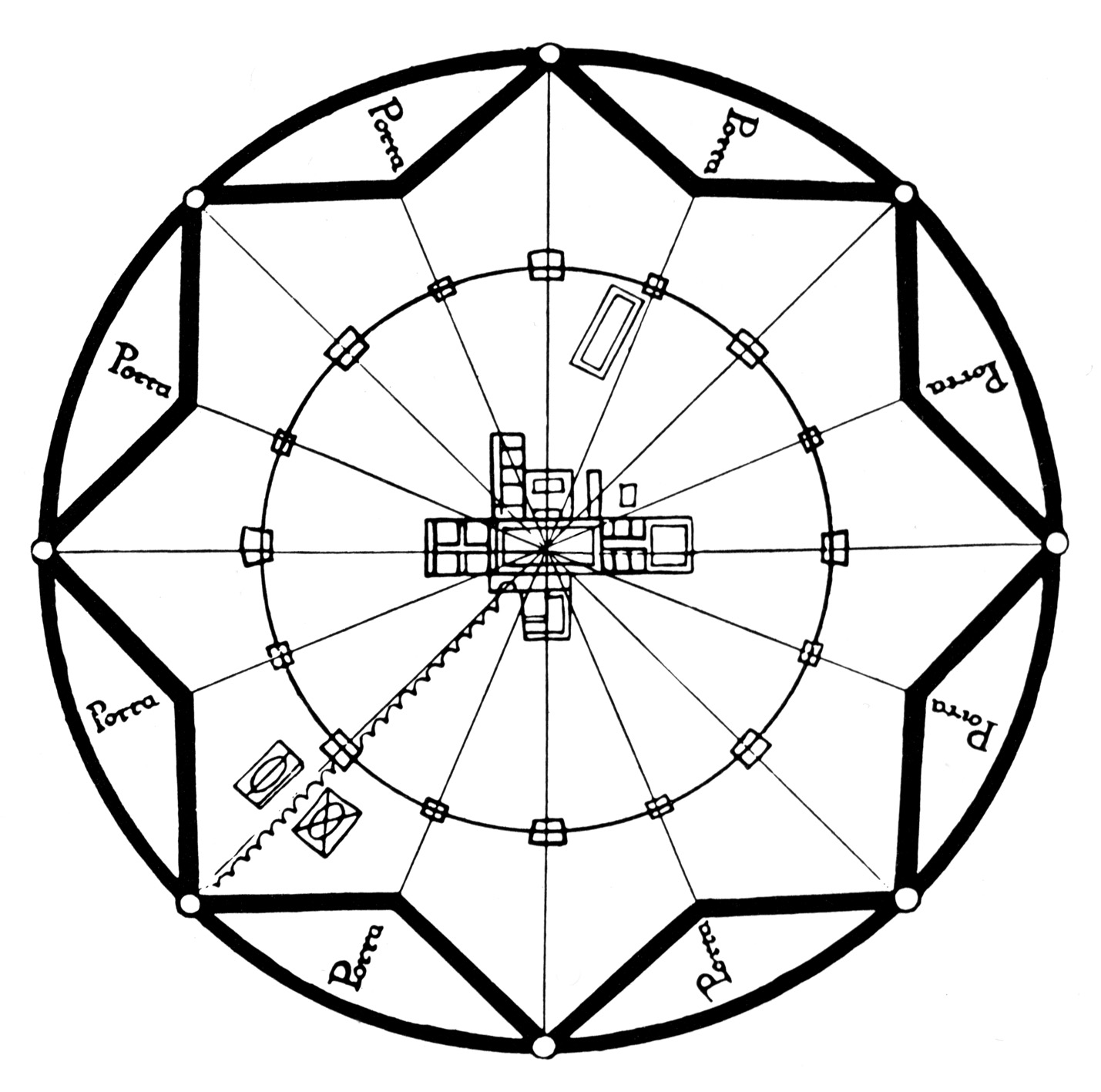
Plan of Sforzinda

In Milan Filarete built the Ospedale Maggiore (c. 1456), the overall form of which was rationally planned as a cross within a square, with the hospital church at the center of the plan. Some of the surviving sections of the much-rebuilt structure show the Gothic detail of Milan's Quattrocento craft traditions, which are at odds with Filarete's design all'antica or "after the Antique". Filarete also worked on the Castello Sforzesco or Sforza Castle and on the Duomo di Milano or Milan Cathedral.

=== Filarete's treatise on architecture and the ideal city of Sforzinda ===
Filarete completed his substantial book on architecture sometime around 1464, which he referred to as his Libro architettonico ("Architectonic book"). Neither he nor his immediate contemporaries ever referred to it as a Trattato ("Treatise"), though it is usually now called such. The Libro, which comprises twenty-five volumes, enjoyed a fairly wide circulation in manuscript form during the Renaissance. The most well known and best preserved copy of the Libro is a profusely illustrated manuscript known as the Codex Magliabechiano (probably drafted c. 1465; now held in the archives of the "Biblioteca Nazionale Centrale di Firenze".). The fact that the Codex Magliabechiano is dedicated to Piero de' Medici and was conserved in Florence suggests that Filarete was well regarded in his native Florence despite his loyalty to Milan.

The book, which is written as a fictional narrative, consists principally of a detailed account of the technical aspects of architecture (e.g., site and material selection, drawing, construction methods, and so on) and a sustained polemic against the Gothic style of Northern Italy, which Filarete calls the "barbarous modern style." Filarete argues instead for the use of classical Roman models. The most famous part of his book is his plan for Sforzinda, an ideal city named after Francesco Sforza, then Duke of Milan. Although Sforzinda was never built, certain aspects of its design are described in considerable detail.

The basic layout of the city is an eight-point star, created by overlaying two squares so that all the corners were equidistant. This shape is then inscribed within a perfect circular moat. This shape is iconographic and probably ties to Filarete’s interest in magic and astrology. Consistent with Quattrocento or fifteenth century notions concerning the talismanic power of geometry and the crucial importance of astrology, Filarete provides, in addition to pragmatic advice on materials, construction, and fortifications, notes on how to propitiate celestial harmony within Sforzinda. His architectonical drawings and even more his allegorical drawings traced on the margins of the Codex Magliabechianus – such as the Allegory of Vertue and the Allegory of the Reason and Will – Filarete shows a remarkable possession of classical sources, maybe known also through the advice of his friend Francesco Filelfo da Tolentino, the main humanist then at the court of Milan.

In terms of planning, each of the outer points of the star had towers, while the inner angles had gates. Each of the gates was an outlet of radial avenues that each passed through a market square, dedicated to certain goods. All the avenues finally converged in a large square which was centrally located. The town contained three squares – one for the prince’s palace, one for the cathedral, and one for the market. Because the Renaissance was much taken with the idea of the canal town, in Filarete's Sforzinda every other street had a canal for cargo transport. The canal system also connected with the river, and thus the outside world, for the import and export of goods. The city also contained many buildings, including parishes and separate schools for boys and girls. An example of a building that appears in the treatise is Filarete’s House of Vice and Virtue, a ten-storey structure with a brothel on the bottom and an academy of learning on the higher levels. Filarete did much study on representation of Vices and Virtues, and there are suggestions that his radial design for the city was inspired by St. Augustine’s Earthly City, whose circular shape was divided into sections, each of which had its own Vice and Virtue.

The design of Sforzinda may have been in part a direct response to the Italian cities of the Medieval period, whose growth did not necessarily depend on city planning as such, which meant they could be difficult to navigate. In part, the Renaissance humanist interest in classical texts may have stimulated preoccupations with geometry in city layouts, as for example, in Plato's description of Atlantis. Filarete’s ideal plan was meant to reflect on society – where a perfect city form would be the image of a perfect society, an idea that was typical of the humanist views prevalent during the High Renaissance. The Renaissance ideal city implied the centralized power of a prince in its organization, an idea following closely on the heels of Dante’s that “The human race is at its best under a monarch.” Thus it could be argued that the Renaissance ideal city form was tensioned between the perceived need for a centralized power and the potential reality of tyranny.

== Influence on architecture and urbanism ==
Filarete's plan of Sforzinda was the first ideal city plan of the Renaissance and his thorough organization of its layout embodied a greater level of conscious city planning than anyone before him. Despite the many references to medieval symbolism incorporated into Sforzinda's design, the city's principles became the archetype for the humanist city during the High Renaissance. The treatise gained interest from many important leaders such as Giangaleazzo Sforza and Piero de' Medici and later when Francesco di Giorgio and Leonardo da Vinci began to plan their ideal cities they borrowed ideas from Filarete.

Although it was never built, Sforzinda served as an inspiration for many future city plans. For example, in the 16th century, Renaissance military engineers and architects combined Filarete's ideal city schemes with defensive fortifications deriving from a more sociopolitical agenda. This notion of combining the ideal and the fortified city became widely disseminated throughout Europe and beyond.
