= Fra Carnevale =

Italian painter (c. 1420/25–1484)

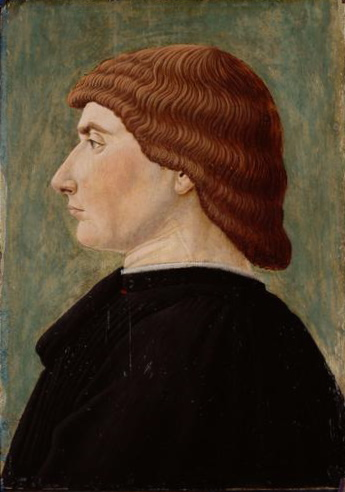
Portrait in profile, 1470 (Kunsthistorisches Museum, Vienna)

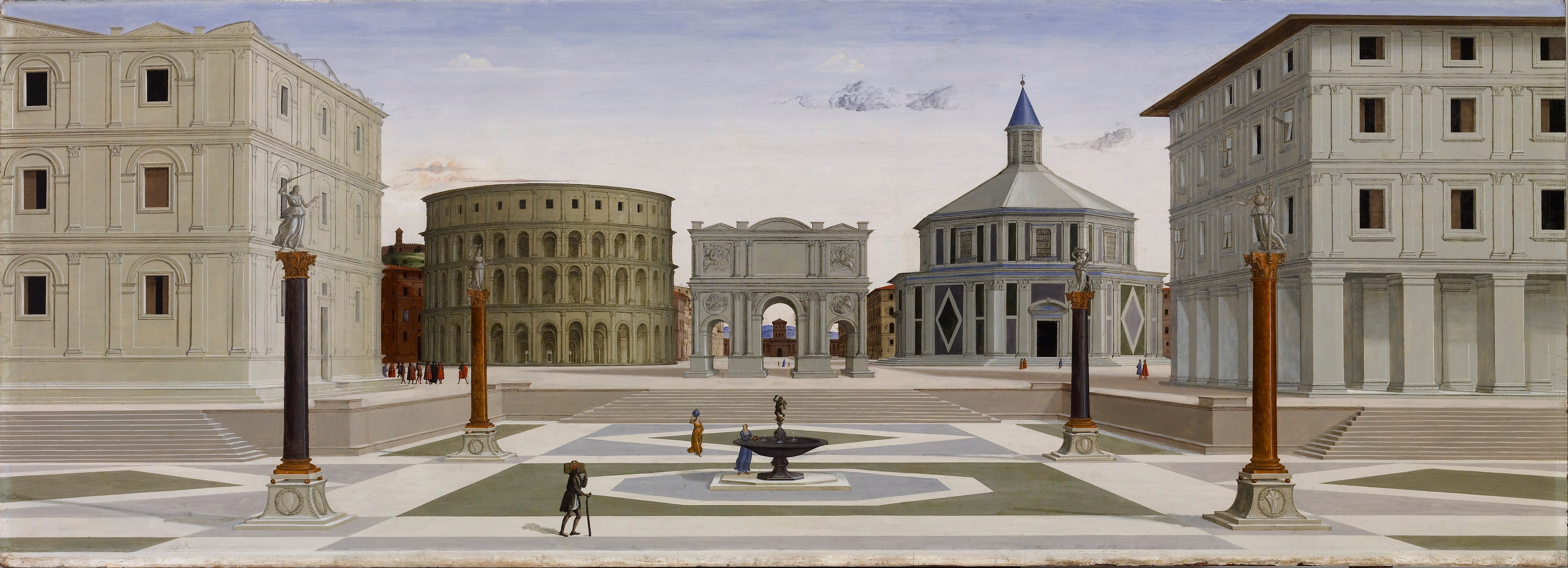
The Ideal City attributed to Carnevale, in the collection of the Walters Art Museum

Fra Carnevale OP (c. 1420–25 – 1484) was an Italian painter of the Quattrocento, active mainly in Urbino. Widely regarded as one of the most enigmatic artists, there are only nine works that can be definitively attributed to Carnevale known of today. Most of these have even been contested as authentic to Carnevale at various points in history.

He is cited by a number of names, including Bartolomeo di Giovanni Corradini, Bartolomeo Coradini, and Fra' Carnevale.

== Historical background ==
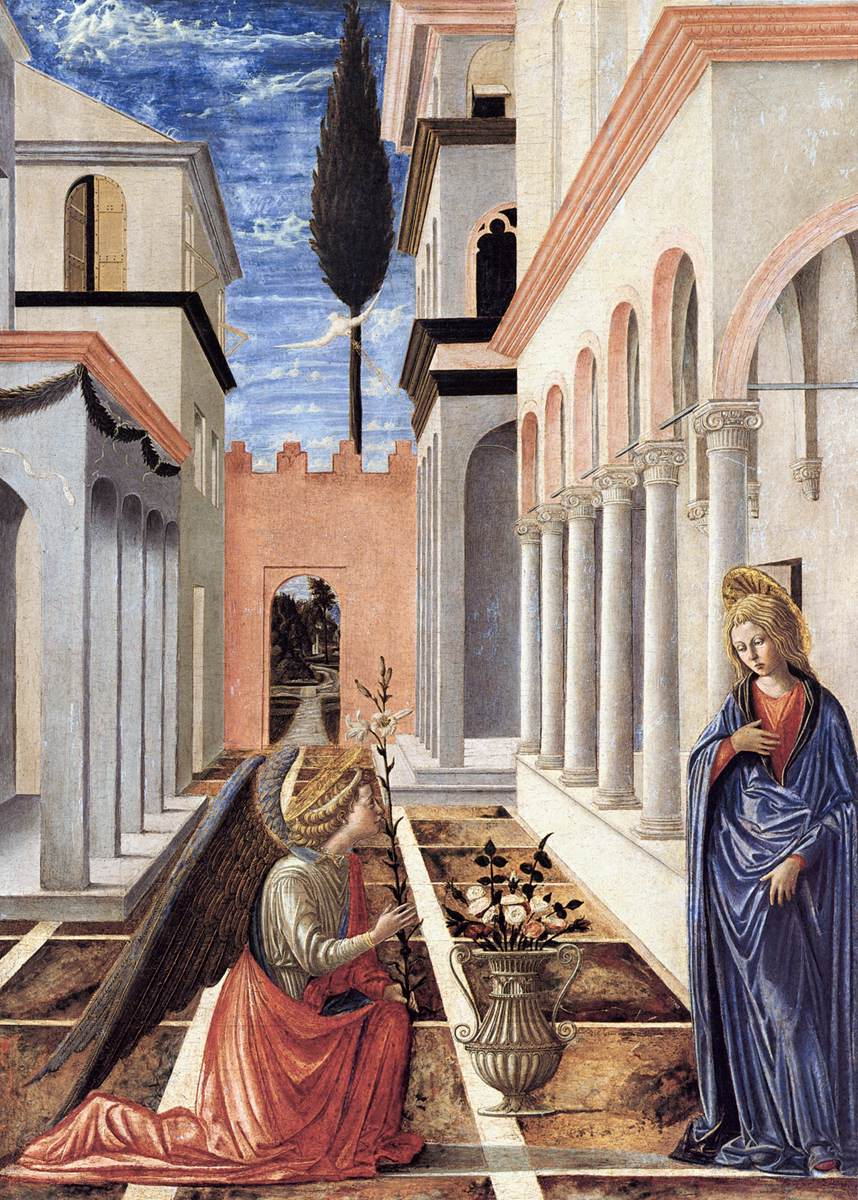
Fra Carnevale - The Annunciation, National Gallery of Art, Washington

He was born in Urbino, and entered the order of Dominicans in 1449 under the name of Fra’ Carnevale or Carnovale. He was a pupil of the Ferrarese painter Antonio Alberti. Farquhar claims he was the teacher of Giovanni Santi. Between 1445 and 1446, he worked in the studio of Filippo Lippi in Florence. Then, sometime before 1450, he returned to Urbino and joined San Domenico. Local scholars show evidence of his activities between 1456 and 1488. During this time, he apprenticed with Fra Jacopo Veneto. He was commissioned for the altarpiece at del Corpus Domini, but ended his work on this in 1456. In 1467, the local record shows his payment for the Santa Maria della Bella altarpiece. From records, we also know that he was curator of San Cassiano del Cavallino and joined the Confraternità di Santa Croce.

For centuries, the only reference to Carnevale existed in Giorgio Vasari's "The Lives of the Artists." Here, Vasari referred to Carnevale as Carnovale da Urbino, the painter of the altarpiece at Santa Maria della Bella in Urbino as well as the influence behind Bramante's architecture of St. Peter's in Rome. Baldinucci's Dictionary of Masters of Disegno cited Fra Carnevale as a student who was well known to local scholars with a reputation for excellence in the art of perspective. These scholars also attributed the altarpiece to him. Luigi Lanzi's 1787 Storia Pittorica dela Italia discusses Fra Carnevale, noting that “Bramante and Raphael studied his work, as nothing better could then be found in Urbino.” Although he was quite harsh in judgment of the perspective used in the altarpiece, he was equally complimentary of the architecture. He was also an architect for the portals of San Domenico in Urbino, providing a foundation for the use of perspective and emphasis on architecture in his paintings.

Carnevale surrounded himself with prominent members of local society, including lawyer Guido Bonclerici, vicar general to the Bishop Giovanni Battista Mellini, Ottaviano Ubaldini, who held power in the court of Urbino, and Matteo di Cataneis, who was close to the Lords of Urbino. His paintings reflect this experience within the elitist culture of his society, even more so than would be expected from a member of a prominent religious order. Within his order, he was a spiritual ascetic given the name “carnevale,” which means “lent.”

== Influences ==
Carnevale's earliest works showed the influence of Dominico Veneziano. However, based on a payment taken by Fra Carnevale on behalf of Antonio Alberti, the assumption is that he apprenticed with this painter in the 1430s. He therefore arrives in Florence in 1445 "as a pupil not an apprentice which implies his early training was in the Marshes, possibly under the monk Jacopo Veneto; however another document connects him with Antonio Alberti." Lippi was recognized as “a crucible for artistic experiments by ‘the 1425 generation.’”

Returning to Urbino, at this time, he began an architectural project and brought artists from Florence, such as Maso di Bartolomeo and Luca della Robbia.

His facial types and technique for articulating drapery folds are recognised from Piero della Francesca. Although his paintings are widely seen as perspectively inaccurate, he uses the motif of architectural backgrounds to his advantage, basing the precision of his style on the influence of his work as an architect. Lomazzo recorded Carnevale as an architect, and the stonework for the cathedral in Urbino is attributed to Carnevale.

== Paintings ==
The painting, "The Ideal City," very often referred to in books on the theory and history of urban design and housed at the Walters Art Museum in Baltimore, is one of three similarly styled paintings and arguably attributed to Fra Carnevale. However, the painting is attributed by others to Francesco di Giorgio Martini, partly due to the latter's greater significance at the Urbino court and because the painting refers to architectural themes he refers to in his architectural treatise derived from Leon Battista Alberti's slightly earlier published treatise. This painting shows Carnevale's strong sense and knowledge of architecture. The linear perspective and the three-dimensional details of the building's facades are impeccable, all very much in the style of Carnevale's work.

Only one of Fra Carnevale's works appears in its original location: in Urbino, Carnevale painted the Federico da Montefeltro alcove in the Palazzo Ducale. The eight other works attributed to Carnevale include the Santa Maria della Bella altarpiece (also known as the Barberini panels or The Birth of the Virgin), an oblong panel in Palazzo Staccoli, The Presentation of the Virgin in the Temple, The Annunciation, The Coronation of the Virgin with Lippi, The Crucifixion, Saint John the Baptist in the Desert, and A Portrait of Man. Several of these works are often contested in regard to Carnevale's hand-- The Coronation of the Virgin with Lippi, The Crucifixion, Saint John the Baptist in the Desert, and A Portrait of Man all have conflicting opinions regarding their origin. Nonetheless, the 2004 exhibit of Carnevale's works in Milan definitively attributed these nine to the artist friar of Urbino.

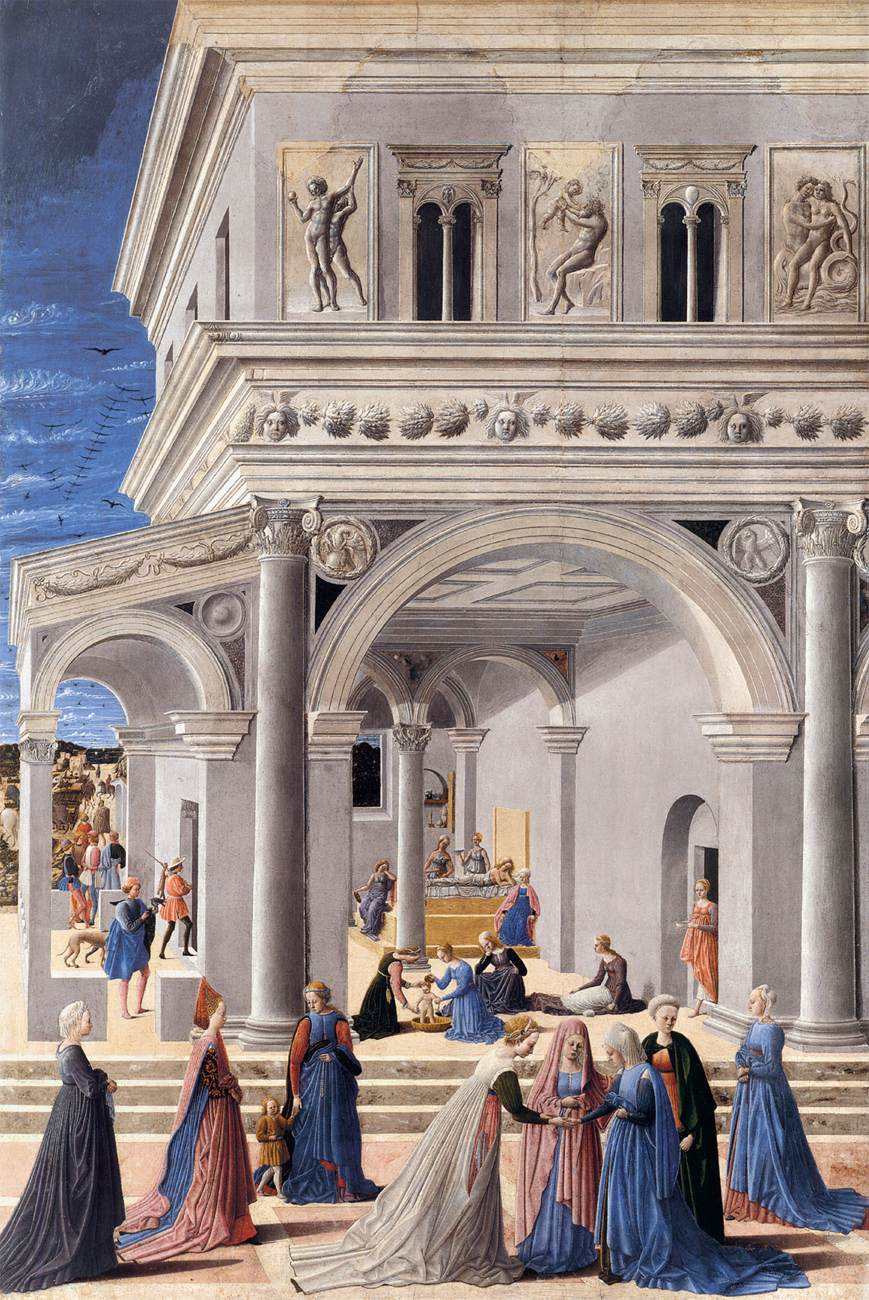
Fra Carnevale - The Birth of the Virgin

The Birth of the Virgin and The Presentation of the Virgin in the Temple, now attributed to Carnevale, are two panels and that are now housed in part in the Metropolitan Museum in New York City and part in the Museum of Fine Arts in Boston. The panels were part of an altarpiece commissioned on behalf of the Santa Maria della Bella in Urbino in 1467. The altarpiece became known as the Barberini panels when they were taken to Rome by Antonio Barberini in 1632. Both pieces are contemporary in conceptualisation while showing humanist-antiquarian interests. The architectural aspects are once again strong and in the forefront, and there is great detailing in the Roman-style reliefs of the buildings. These reliefs reflect the architecture of the ducal palace at Urbino. The play of light on the draping of the clothing and the shadow and light of the buildings is another signature Carnevale trait. The Birth of the Virgin is non-conventional in its composition as the infant is not in the forefront and the focal point of the painting, while in The Presentation of the Virgin in the Temple Carnevale chooses to place three figures at the high altar instead of the traditional Jewish priest. The story of the Virgin's life is shown in the reliefs on the buildings, while showing symbolism of a pagan past.

In 1930, the Barberini panels appeared in the "Exhibition of Italian Art" at the Royal Academy of London. They were well-received and acclaimed, due in part to their uncertain attribution. The panels were sent together to a 2004 exhibit of Carnevale's works in Milan. At that time, there were only nine pieces definitively attributed to Carnevale, though there is speculation that other works not yet attributed to Carnevale and other works by Carnevale exist in private collections. The Milan exhibit included works hypothesised to be from Carnevale in order to prompt theoretical discussion regarding the true attribution.

The Annunciation is currently at National Gallery in Washington, DC. This piece shows a steep perspective of the buildings, as in his other works, bright colours in the buildings and clothing with deep folds and crevices in the cloth. Here again, Carnevale is non-traditional by setting the scene outdoors on a street.

A Portrait of a Man, one of the controversial works, looks almost like a Roman relief from one of the buildings in Carnevale's other paintings, but with colour added. The deep, chiselled details of the hair are reminiscent of the painting style used for the heavy undulating fabric in the Barberini panels. The detail of the muscles and veins in the neck is very naturalistic. This painting does, however, lack the usual vibrancy of colour that is known in Carnevale's work.

Controversy surrounded the four pieces, Saint John the Baptist, The Crucifixion, Saint Peter, and Saint Francis, regarding whether or not they were from the same altarpiece. The examination of the carpentry of the panels undertaken for the exhibition at the Metropolitan Museum demonstrates that, despite discrepancies in the dimensions of the painted surfaces, the four works are, indeed, from a single polyptych. The Crucifixion had previously been attributed to Giovanni Boccati, Piero della Francesca, and Domenico Veneziano, but since the piece referred more to Lombard art styles versus the Florentine culture of Lippi or Veneziano's works, it was, in the end, attributed to Carnevale. When viewing all four of these panels, we see the dense model-like treatment of the drapery with its deep shadows, yet there is a sensitivity in the manner by which the highlights are painted. Even the rocks in the background of The Crucifixion appear to be made of cloth instead of solid earth.

== Drawings ==
One drawing now attributed to Fra Carnevale appears as the middle drawing from the bottom part of a page from Vasari's Libro de’ Disegni. This drawing was originally attributed to Piero della Francesca, whose works overlapped the latter years of Carnevale's productions. This, however, appears to be an anachronism of sorts, as the centre drawing appears instead to be from Florence during Fra Carnevale's teenage years. The drawing depicts a youth worker in rumpled clothing whose proud stature betrays his misshapen appearance. Stylistically, this youth shows a pouting expression that is a trademark Carnevale caricature, as well as the standardised form of Carnevale's characterisation of the physique and the details of the character's dress. Known more for his ability to use shadow and light convincingly, Fra Carnevale failed to produce equally convincing physiology in his human subjects. They instead appear sinuous, and the effect is flat rather than alive.

Libro de’ Disegni contains another drawing likely completed by Fra Carnevale. This depiction of eleven male nudes was originally attributed to Domenico Veneziano, but instead was likely completed between 1445 and 1450 when Fra Carnevale apprenticed with Filippo Lippi.

Another set of drawings has a more controversial attribution to Fra Carnevale, coming out of Filippo Lippi's Coronation of the Virgin. Within this body of art, there are two reproductions that may possibly have been completed by Fra Carnevale: a woman standing and a monk kneeling. Due to the fact that these are reproductions of other works, the attribution to Fra Carnevale is less certain.

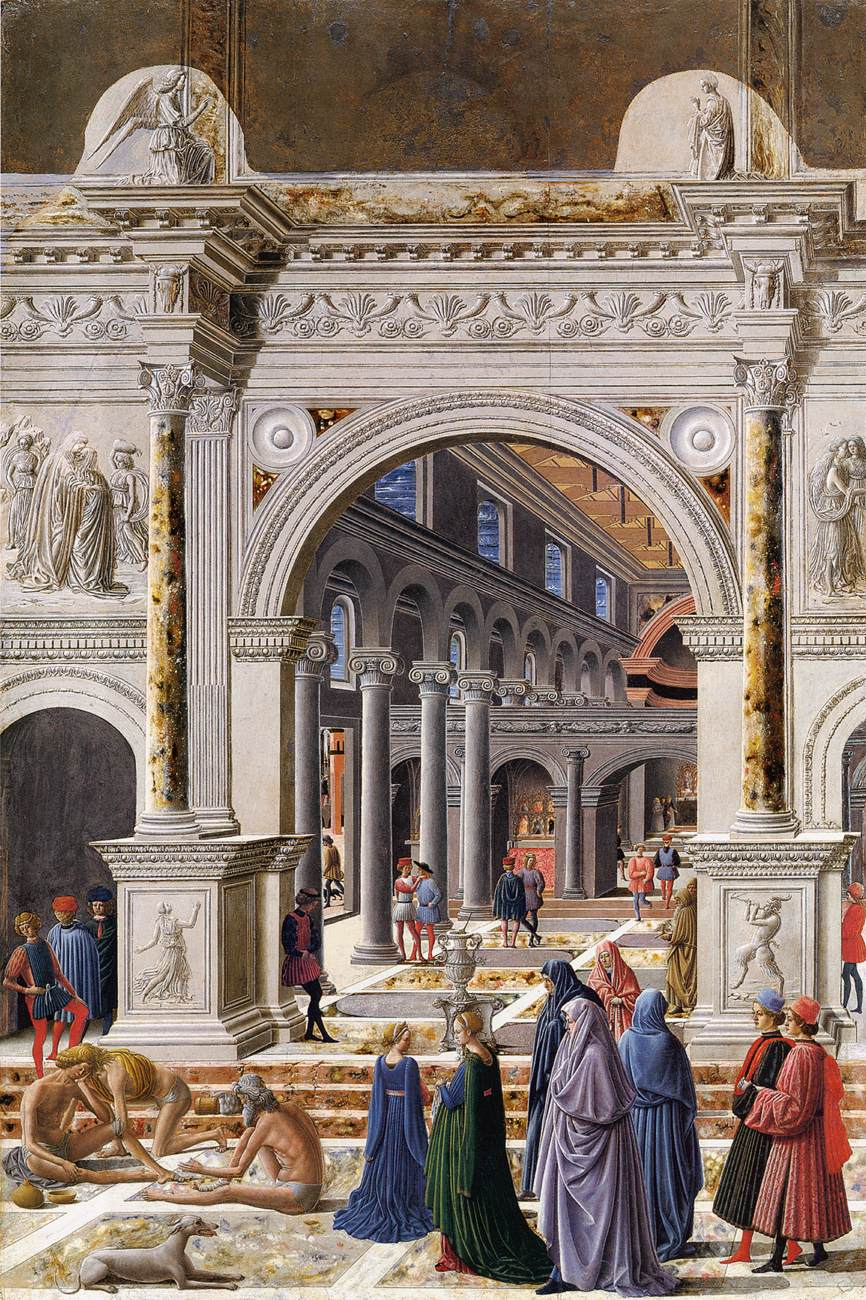
Presentation of the Virgin in the Temple

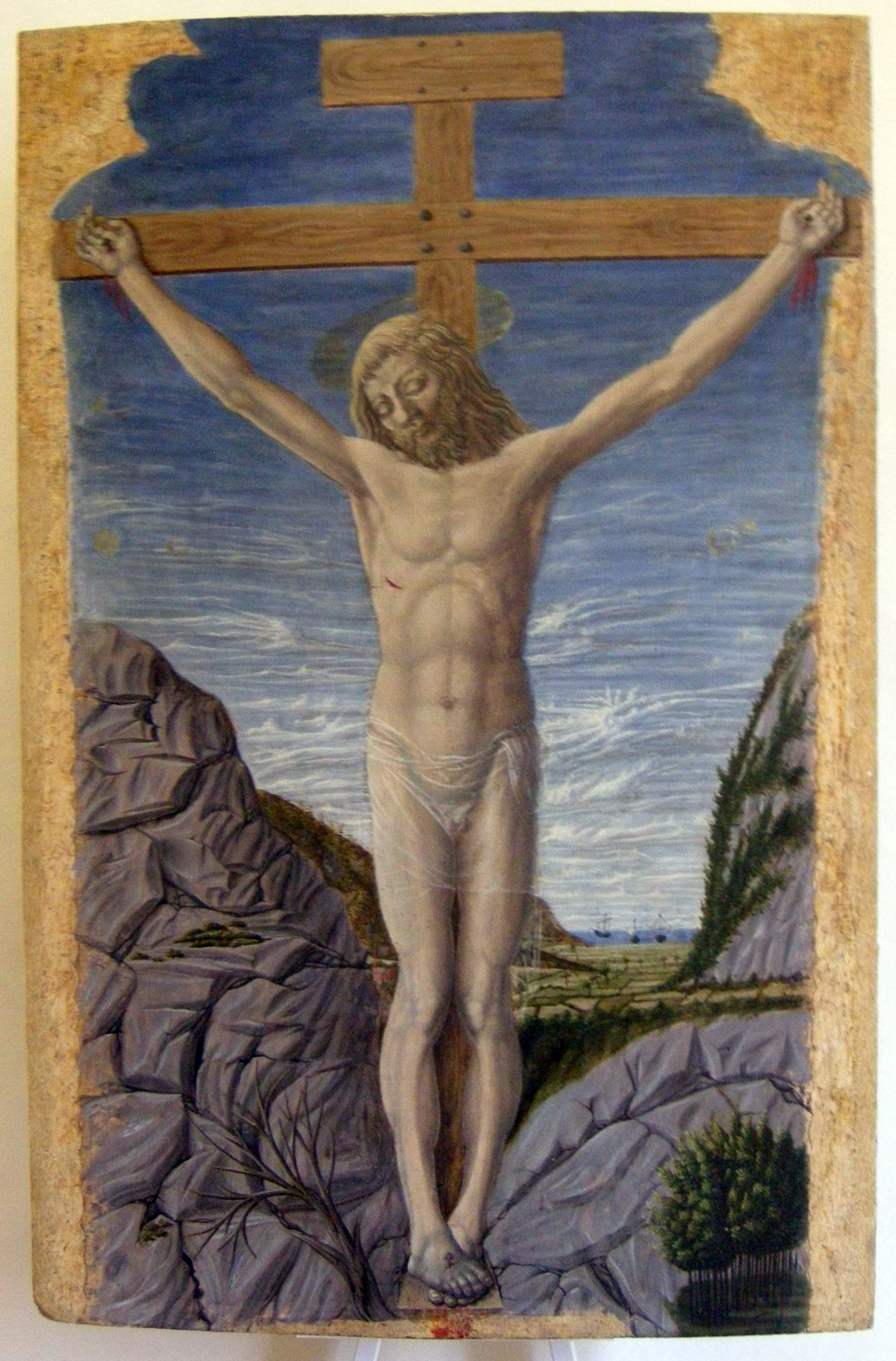
The Crucifixion

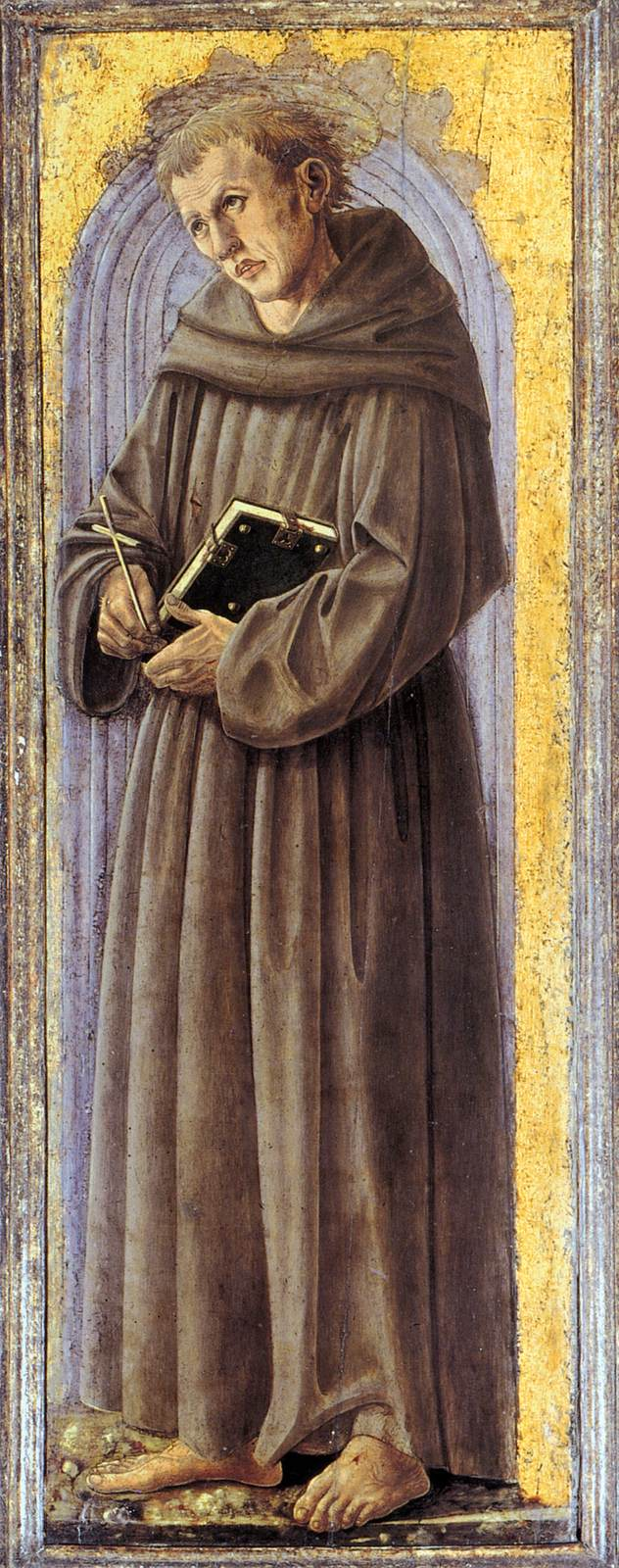
Saint Francis

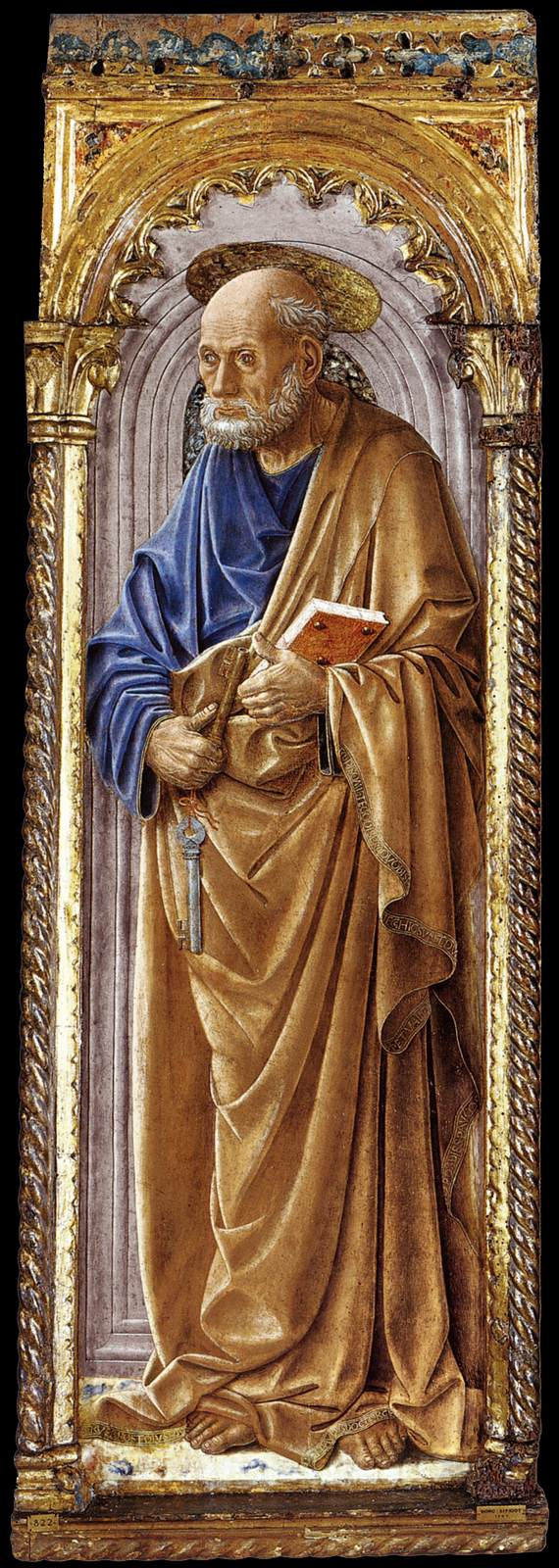
Saint Peter

== Sources ==
- Biography in Italian.
- Farquhar, Maria (1855). Ralph Nicholson Wornum (ed.). Biographical catalogue of the principal Italian painters. London: Woodfall & Kinder. p. 28.
