= Sforzinda =

Visionary ideal city designed by Antonio di Pietro Averlino

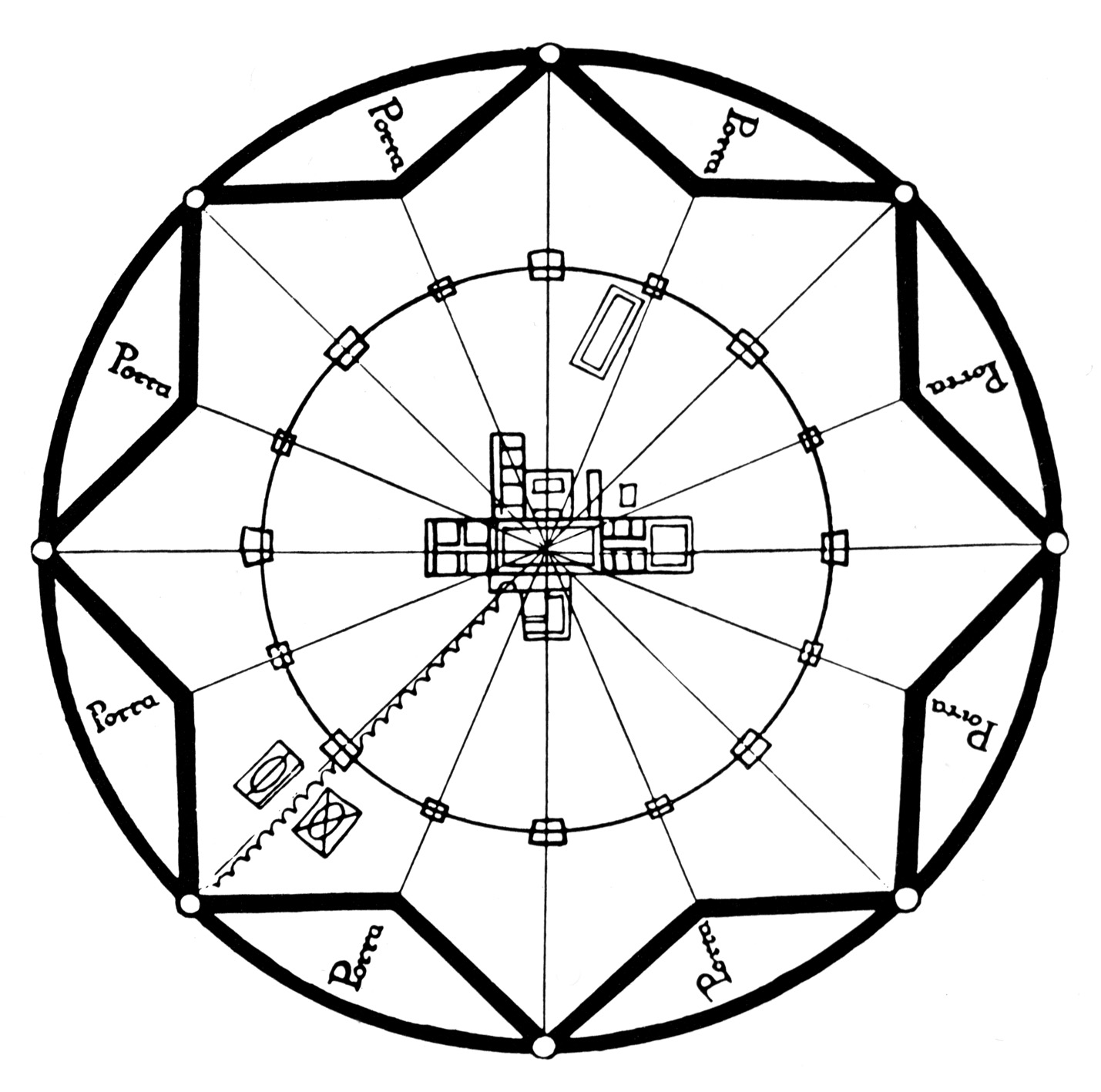
Plan of Sforzinda

Sforzinda is a visionary ideal city named after Francesco Sforza, then Duke of Milan. It was designed by Renaissance architect Antonio di Pietro Averlino (c. 1400 – c. 1469), also known as "Averulino" or "Filarete".

== Layout ==
Although Sforzinda was never built, certain aspects of its design are described in considerable detail. The basic layout of the city is an eight-point star, created by overlaying two squares so that all the corners were equidistant. This shape is then inscribed within a perfect circular moat. This shape is iconographic and probably ties to Filarete's interest in magic and astrology. Consistent with Quattrocento or fifteenth century notions concerning the talismanic power of geometry and the crucial importance of astrology, Filarete provides, in addition to pragmatic advice on materials, construction, and fortifications, notes on how to propitiate celestial harmony within Sforzinda.

In terms of planning, each of the outer points of the star had towers, while the inner angles had gates. Each of the gates was an outlet of radial avenues that each passed through a market square, dedicated to certain goods. All the avenues finally converged in a large square which was centrally located. The town contained three squares: One for the prince's palace, one for the cathedral, and one for the market.

Because the Italian Renaissance was much taken with the idea of the canal town, in Filarete's Sforzinda every other street had a canal for cargo transport. The canal system also connected with the river, and thus the outside world, for the import and export of goods.

The city also contained many buildings, including parishes and separate schools for boys and girls. An example of a building that appears in the treatise is Filarete's House of Vice and Virtue, a ten-story structure with a brothel on the bottom and an academy of learning on the higher levels. Filarete did much study on representation of Vices and Virtues, and there are suggestions that his radial design for the city was inspired by St. Augustine’s Earthly City, whose circular shape was divided into sections, each of which had its own Vice and Virtue.

== Motivation ==
The design of Sforzinda may have been in part a direct response to the congested cities of the Medieval period, whose organic growth did not ordinarily depend on conscious city planning, (Note: Exceptions are the new cities, called bastides, founded from the 12th to 14th centuries in southeastern France, in order to replace destroyed cities and organize defence and growth. Among those, Monpazier, Beaumont-du-Périgord, and Villeréal may be cited.) which meant they could be difficult to navigate or control.

In part, the Renaissance humanist interest in classical texts may have stimulated preoccupations with geometry in city layouts, as for example, in Plato's description of Atlantis. Filarete’s ideal plan was meant to reflect on society – where a perfect city form would be the image of a perfect society, an idea that was typical of the humanist views prevalent during the Renaissance.

The Renaissance ideal city, implied the centralized power of a prince in its organization, an idea following closely on the heels of Dante’s that "The human race is at its best under a monarch." Thus, it could be argued that the Renaissance ideal city form was tensioned between the perceived need for a centralized power and the potential reality of tyranny.

== See also ==
- Palmanova
