= Il Galateo =

1558 book by Giovanni della Casa

Galateo: The Rules of Polite Behavior (Il Galateo, overo de' costumi) (Note: Complete title: Trattato nel quale, sotto la persona d'un vecchio idiota ammaestrante un suo giovanetto, si ragiona de' modi che si debbono o tenere o schifare nella comune conversazione, cognominato Galateo overo de' costumi) by Florentine Giovanni della Casa (1503–56) was published in Venice in 1558. A guide to what one should do and avoid in ordinary social life, this courtesy book of the Renaissance explores subjects such as dress, table manners, and conversation. It became so popular that the title, which refers to the name of one of the author’s distinguished friends, entered into the Italian language as a general term for social etiquette.

Della Casa did not live to see his manuscript’s widespread and lasting success, which arrived shortly after its publication. It was translated into French (1562), English (1576), Latin (1580), Spanish (1585), and German (1587), and has been read and studied in every generation. Della Casa's work set the foundation for modern etiquette writers and authorities on manners, such as “Miss Manners” Judith Martin, Amy Vanderbilt, and Emily Post.

== Context ==
In the twentieth century, scholars usually situated Galateo among the courtesy books and conduct manuals that were very popular during the Renaissance. In addition to Castiglione’s celebrated Courtier, other important Italian treatises and dialogues include Alessandro Piccolomini’s Moral institutione (1560), Luigi Cornaro’s Treatise on the Sober Life (1558-1565), and Stefano Guazzo’s Art of Civil Conversation (1579).

In recent years, attention has turned to the humor and dramatic flair of Della Casa’s book. It has been argued that the style sheds light on Shakespeare’s comedies. When it first appeared in English translation by Robert Peterson in 1575, it would have been available in book stalls in Shakespeare's London. Stephen Greenblatt, author of Will in the World, writes, "To understand the culture out of which Shakespeare is writing, it helps to read Renaissance courtesy manuals like Baldassare Castiglione’s famous Book of the Courtier (1528) or, still better, Giovanni della Casa’s Galateo or, The Rules of Polite Behavior (1558, available in a delightful new translation by M.F. Rusnak). It is fine for gentlemen and ladies to make jokes, della Casa writes, for everyone likes people who are funny, and a genuine witticism produces “joy, laughter, and a kind of astonishment.” But mockery has its risks. It is perilously easy to cross a social and moral line of no return."

Historians argue that Galateo should be read in the context of international European politics, and some contend that the work expresses an attempt to distinguish Italian excellence. “During the half-century when Italy fell prey to foreign invasion (1494-1559) and was overrun by French, Spanish and German armies, the Italian ruling classes were battered by - as they often envisaged them - "barbarians". In their humiliation and laboured responses, Italian writers took to reflecting on ideals, such as the ideal literary language, the ideal cardinal, ideal building types, and the ideal general or field commander. But in delineating the rules of conduct, dress and conversation for the perfect gentleman, they were saying, in effect, "We are the ones who know how to cut the best figure in Europe".

A skilled writer in Latin, Della Casa followed Erasmus in presenting a harmonious and simple morality based on Aristotle’s Nicomachean Ethics and notion of the mean, as well as other classical sources. His treatise also reveals an obsession with graceful conduct and self-fashioning during the time of Michelangelo and Titian: “A man must not be content with doing good things, but he must also study to do them gracefully. Grace is nothing other than that luster which shines from the appropriateness of things that are suitably ordered and well arranged one with the other and together.” The work has been edited in this light by Stefano Prandi, Emanuela Scarpa, and Giorgio Manganelli among others.

The work may be read in the context of what Norbert Elias called the “civilizing process.” It is generally agreed that, given the popularity and impact of Galateo, the cultural elite of the Italian Renaissance taught Europe how to behave. Giulio Ferroni argues that Della Casa “proposes a closed and oppressive conformity, made of caution and hypocrisy, hostile to every manifestation of liberty and originality.” Others contend, on the contrary, that the work represents ambivalence, self-control, and a modern understanding of the individual in a society based on civility, intercultural competence and social networking.

== Content ==
Della Casa addresses gentlemanly citizens who wish to convey a winning and attractive image. With a casual style and dry humor, he writes about everyday concerns, from posture to telling jokes to table manners. "Our manners are attractive when we regard others' pleasure and not our own delight," Della Casa writes.

Unlike Baldassare Castiglione's The Book of the Courtier, the rules of polite behavior in Galateo are not directed to ideal men in a Renaissance court. Instead, Della Casa observes the ordinary habits of people who do not realize that clipping one's nails in public is bad. "One should not annoy others with such stuff as dreams, especially since most dreams are by and large idiotic," he advises.

Valentina D'Urso, Professor of Psychology and author of Le Buone Maniere, writes, "The founding father of this literary genre, [Galateo] is an extraordinary read, lively and passionate. One doesn’t know whether to admire more its rich style or the wisdom of the practical words of advice."

== Language and style ==
The work was preceded by a short treatise on the same subject in Latin, De officiis inter tenuiores et potentiores amicos (1546). Latin at the time was the language of learned society, and Della Casa was a first-rate classicist and public speaker. The treatise opens with a Latinate conciossiacosaché, which gained Galateo a reputation for being pedantic and labored. However, Giuseppe Baretti and poets such as Giacomo Leopardi ranked Della Casa alongside Machiavelli as a master of Italian prose style. "Una delle prose più eleganti e più attiche del secolo decimosesto," (one of the most elegant and Attic prose works of the sixteenth century) Leopardi said. Della Casa’s Galateo is, in the words of scholar E. H. Wilkins, “still valuable…for the pleasant ease with which most of it is written, and for its common sense, its plentiful humor, and its general amenity.”

Della Casa frequently alludes to Dante and more often to Boccaccio, whose Decameron he evidently knew very well and whose style he imitates. Several comments on language in Galateo reflect the Tuscan language model proposed about the same time by Della Casa’s friend Pietro Bembo.

== Summary of Galateo ==
In the first chapter it is said that a gentleman should be at all times courteous, pleasant, and in manners beautiful. Although good manners may not appear as important as liberality, constancy, or magnanimity, they are nonetheless a virtue for achieving the esteem of others.

One must not mention, do, or think anything that invokes images in the mind that are dirty or disreputable. One should not reveal by one's gestures that said person has just returned from the bathroom, do not blow one's nose and look into the handkerchief, avoid spitting and yawning.

Della Casa tells his reader that outward appearance is very important, so clothes must be tailored and conform to prevailing custom, reflecting one’s social status.

In Chapter 7, Della Casa deals with a pivotal subject - conversation. Della Casa says to talk about topics of interest to all present and show respect to everyone, avoiding anything that is base or petty.

Chapter 14 discusses being in places with other people, starting with types of ceremonies, false flatteries, and fawning behavior. Another matter is whether the ceremonies are made to us: never refuse because it could be taken as a sign of arrogance.

Della Casa returns to illustrate the customs of conversation and public speaking. Language should, as much as possible, be "orderly and well-expressed" so that the listener is able to understand what the speaker intends. In addition to the clarity of the words used, it is also important that they sound pleasant. Before talking about any topic, it is good to have thought it out. It is not polite to interrupt someone while talking, nor to help him find his words.

In the last three chapters, the author writes about behaviour in general: actions should be appropriate and done with grace. A gentleman should never run, or walk too slowly. Della Casa brings us to behavior at the table, such as not scratching, not eating like a pig, not using a toothpick or sharing food. In Della Casa’s vision, slight slips of decorum become taboo.

== Publication history and reception ==
It was probably first drafted during his stay at the Abbey of Saint Eustace at Nervesa, near Treviso, between 1551 and 1555. Galateo was first published in Venice, and was edited by Erasmus Gemini in 1558. The first separate publication appeared in Milan a year later. The Vatican manuscript (formerly Parraciani Ricci), in Latin with autograph corrections, was edited and published by Gennaro Barbarisi in 1990. The manuscript contains neither the title nor the division into chapters. Many variants in the first edition are attributed to Erasmus Gemini.

The Spanish Galateo of Lucas Gracián Dantisco was very influential in the seventeenth century. In the Enlightenment, the letters of Lord Chesterfield show the influence of Galateo, as does a self-help manuscript of George Washington. The first American edition was published in Baltimore in 1811, with a short appendix on how to slice and serve meats.

== Editions and translations ==
- Giovanni Della Casa, Galateo overo de' costumi, a cura di Emanuela Scarpa, Franco Cosimo Panini Editore, Modena 1990 (based on the 1558 edition).
- Giovanni Della Casa, Galateo, Galatheo, ò vero de' costumi, a cura di Gennaro Barbarisi, Marsilio, Venezia 1991 (based on the manuscript).
- Giovanni Della Casa, Galateo. Translated by R. S. Pine-Coffin, Penguin Books, 1950s.
- Giovanni Della Casa, Galateo: A Renaissance Treatise on Manners. Translated by Konrad Eisenbichler, Kenneth R. Bartlett. Centre for Reformation and Renaissance Studies, 1986, 2009.
- Giovanni Della Casa, Galateo: The Rules of Polite Behavior. Edited and Translated by M. F. Rusnak. University of Chicago Press, 2013.
