= The Book of the Courtier =

1528 book by Baldassare Castiglione

Il Cortegiano
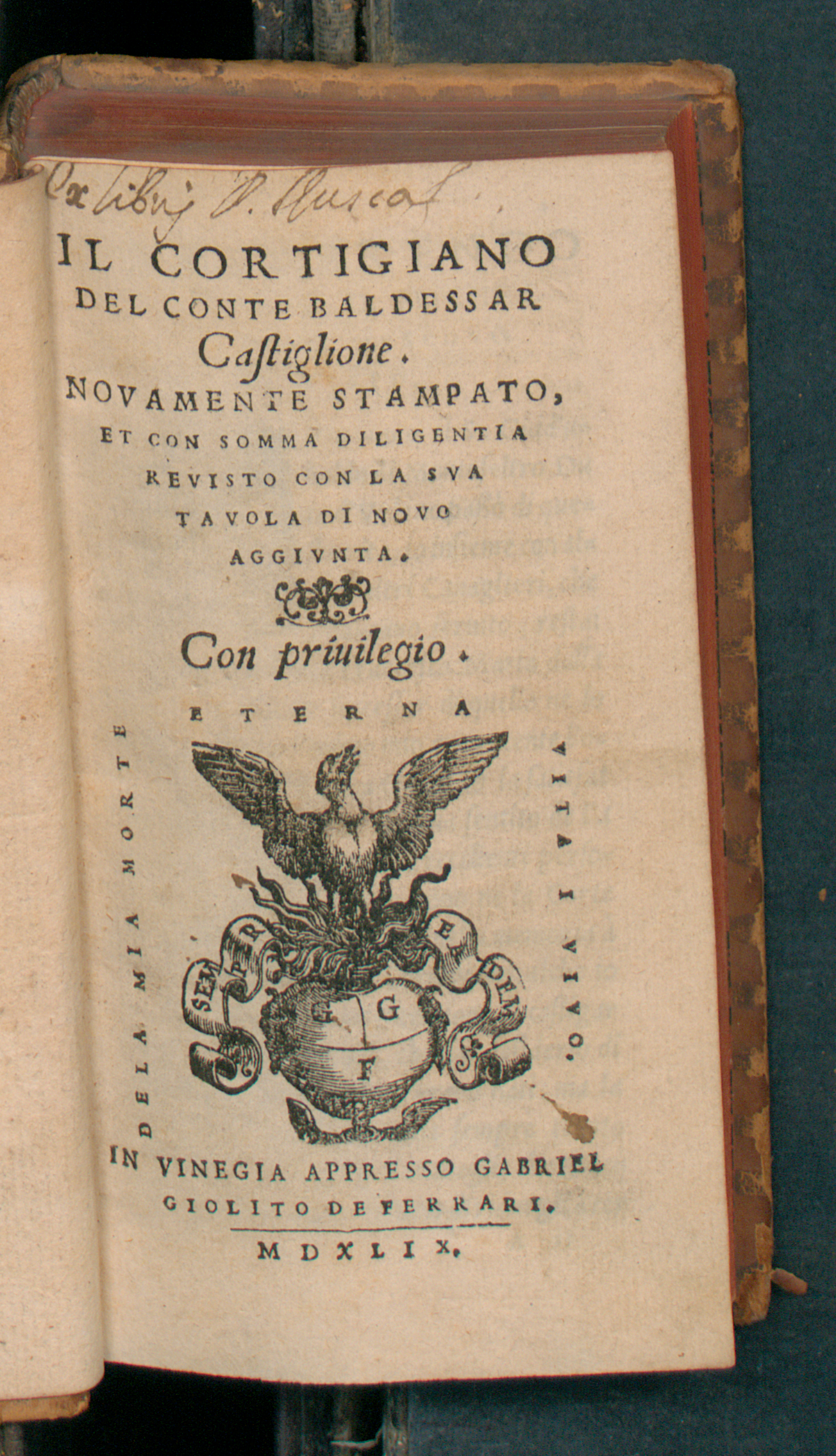
- Language: Italian
- Subject: Etiquette
- Publisher: Aldine Press
- Publication date: 1528
- ISBN: 9788806132057
- OCLC: 39459497
- Dewey Decimal: 170.44
- LC Class: BJ1604 .C3

The Book of the Courtier (Italian: Il Cortegiano [il korteˈdʒaːno]) by Baldassare Castiglione is a lengthy philosophical dialogue on the topic of what constitutes an ideal courtier or (in the third chapter) court lady, worthy to befriend and advise a prince or political leader. Inspired by the Spanish court during his time as Ambassador of the Holy See (1524–1529), Castiglione set the narrative of the book in his years as a courtier in the Duchy of Urbino. The book quickly became enormously popular and was assimilated by its readers into the genre of prescriptive courtesy books or books of manners—dealing with issues of etiquette, self-presentation, and morals, particularly at princely, or royal courts—books such as Giovanni Della Casa's Il Galateo (1558) and Stefano Guazzo's The Civil Conversation (1574). The Book of the Courtier was much more than that, however, having the character of a drama, an open-ended philosophical discussion, and an essay. It has also been seen as a veiled political allegory.

The book portrays the small courts of the High Renaissance which were vanishing in the Italian Wars — with a reverent tribute to the friends of Castiglione's youth. It pays tribute in particular to the chastely married Duchess Elisabetta Gonzaga of Urbino, to whom Castiglione had addressed a sequence of Platonic sonnets, and who died in 1526. The work was composed over the course of twenty years, beginning in 1508, and ultimately published in 1528 by the Aldine Press in Venice just before the author's death. An influential English translation by Thomas Hoby was published in 1561.

== Principles ==
The book is organized as a series of conversations supposed to have taken place over four nights in 1507 between the courtiers of the Duchy of Urbino, at a time when Castiglione was himself a member of the Duke's Court (although he is not portrayed as one of the interlocutors). The nature of an ideal courtier is debated between the many characters on the basis of various qualities, such as the need for noble rank, physical prowess, modesty, and pleasant physique, among other attributes. Different characters grant different levels of importance to these various qualities throughout the discussion.

The ideal courtier is described as having a cool mind, a good voice (with beautiful, elegant and brave words) along with proper bearing and gestures. At the same time though, the courtier is expected to have a warrior spirit, to be athletic, and have good knowledge of the humanities, Classics and fine arts. Over the course of four evenings, members of the court try to describe the perfect gentleman of the court. In the process, they debate the nature of nobility, humor, women, and love.

== Reception ==
The Book of the Courtier was widely distributed around Europe, with editions printed in six languages and in twenty European centers. The 1561 English translation by Thomas Hoby had a great influence on the English upper class's conception of English gentlemen. The Courtier enjoyed influence for some generations, especially in Elizabethan England, where Italian culture was very much in fashion.

== Rhetoric ==
Of the many qualities Castiglione's characters attribute to their perfect courtier, oratory and the manner in which the courtier presents himself while speaking is amongst the most highly discussed. Wayne Rebhorn, a Castiglione scholar, states that the courtier's speech and behavior in general is "designed to make people marvel at him, to transform himself into a beautiful spectacle for others to contemplate." As explained by Count Ludovico, the success of the courtier depends greatly on his reception by the audience from the first impression. This partly explains why the group considers the courtier's dress so vital to his success.

Castiglione's characters opine about how their courtier can impress his audience and win its approval. Similar to the Classical Roman rhetoricians Cicero and Quintilian, Castiglione stresses the importance of delivery while speaking. In Book I, the Count states that when the courtier speaks he must have a "sonorous, clear, sweet and well sounding" voice that is neither too effeminate nor too rough and be "tempered by a calm face and with a play of the eyes that shall give an effect of grace" (Castiglione 1.33). This grace, or grazia, becomes an important element in the courtier's appearance to the audience. Edoardo Saccone states in his analysis of Castiglione, "grazia consists of, or rather is obtained through, sprezzatura."

According to the Count, sprezzatura is the most important rhetorical device the courtier needs. Peter Burke describes sprezzatura in The Book of the Courtier as "nonchalance", "careful negligence", and "effortless and ease". The ideal courtier is someone who "conceals art, and presents what is done and said as if it was done without effort and virtually without thought" (31).

The Count advocates the courtier engage in sprezzatura, or this "certain nonchalance", in all the activities he participates in, especially speech. In Book I, he states, "Accordingly we may affirm that to be true art which does not appear to be art; nor to anything must we give greater care than to conceal art, for if it is discovered, it quite destroys our credit and brings us into small esteem" (Castiglione 1.26). The Count reasons that by obscuring his knowledge of letters, the courtier gives the appearance that his "orations were composed very simply" as if they sprang up from "nature and truth [rather] than from study and art" (1.26). This much more natural appearance, even though it is not natural by any means, is more advantageous to the courtier.

The Count contends that if the courtier wants to attain grazia and be esteemed as excellent, it would be in his best interest to have this appearance of nonchalance. By failing to employ sprezzatura, he destroys his opportunity for grace. By applying sprezzatura to his speech and everything else he does, the courtier appears to have grazia and impresses his audience, thereby achieving excellence and perfection (Saccone 16).

Another feature of rhetoric which Castiglione discusses is the role of written language and style. Castiglione declined to imitate Boccaccio and write in Tuscan Italian, as was customary at the time; instead he wrote in the Italian used in his native Lombardy (he was born near Mantua): as the Count says, "certainly it would require a great deal of effort on my part if in these discussions of ours I wished to use those old Tuscan words which the Tuscans of today have discarded; and what's more I'm sure you would all laugh at me" (Courtier 70). Here, the use of the old and outdated Tuscan language is seen as a form of excess rather than a desirable trait. Castiglione states that had he followed Tuscan usage in his book, his description of sprezzatura would appear hypocritical, in that his effort would be seen as lacking in nonchalance (Courtier 71).

Federico responds to the Count's assessment of the use of spoken language by posing the question as to what is the best language in which to write rhetoric. The Count's response is that the language does not matter, but rather the rhetoric's style, authority, and grace (Courtier 71). Robert J. Graham, a Renaissance literary scholar, notes that "questions of whose language is privileged at any given historical moment are deeply implicated in matters of personal, social and cultural significance", which he states is the primary reason for Castiglione's usage of the native vernacular. This also illustrates the Count's response to the relativity of language in Latin. With the role of language set, Castiglione begins to describe the style and authority in which the courtier must write in order to become successful.

The Count explains, "It is right that greater pains would be taken to make what is written more polished and correct... they should be chosen from the most beautiful of those employed in speech" (Courtier 71). This is where the style of which the courtier writes encourages the persuasiveness or success of a speech. The success of a written speech, in contrast to the spoken speech, hinges on the notion that "we are willing to tolerate a great deal of improper and even careless usage" in oral rhetoric than written rhetoric. The Count explains that along with proper word usage, an ideal courtier must have a proper sense of style and flow to their words. These words must be factual yet entertaining as the Count states, "then, it is necessary to arrange what is to be said or written in its logical order, and after that to express it well in words that, if I am not mistaken, should be appropriate, carefully chosen, clear and well formed, but above all that are still in popular use" (Courtier 77). This form of emphasis on language is noted by Graham as; "Although the Count is aware that more traditional aspects of the orator (appearance, gestures, voice, etc.) ... all this will be futile and of little consequence if the ideas conveyed by these words themselves are not witty or elegant to the requirements of the situation".

== See also ==
- Book of the Civilized Man
- The Book of the Governor
