= Courtesy book =

Genre of etiquette manual

A courtesy book (also book of manners) was a didactic manual of knowledge for courtiers to handle matters of etiquette, socially acceptable behaviour, and personal morals, with a special emphasis upon life in a royal court; the genre of courtesy literature dates from the 13th century.

== Medieval ==
Courtesy books formed part of the didactic literature of the Middle Ages, covering topics from religion and ethics to social awareness and social conduct. While firmly normative in their bent, they also showed an awareness of the human realities that did not fit neatly under the rubric of their precepts. Such books appealed both to an aristocratic readership and to aspiring urban middle classes.

The oldest known courtesy book from Germany is the mid-thirteenth century Tannhäuser Book of Manners.

Another of the oldest known courtesy books of Germany is the learning-poems of "Winsbecke" and "Winsbeckin", written around 1220 by an anonymous author.

The oldest known courtesy book from Italy around 1215/16 is the Der Wälsche Gast by Thomasin von Zirclaere, speaking to a German audience.

The oldest known courtesy book from England is Book of the Civilized Man by Daniel of Beccles, also known as the Liber Urbani, from the beginning of the 13th century – possibly 1190AD.

== Renaissance ==
The Renaissance saw the re-emergence of urban civilisation in the Italian city-states, drawing on the earlier urban civilizations of ancient Greece and Rome, but developing new ideals of manners and courtesy. Three sixteenth century Italian texts on courtly manners and morals – Baldassarre Castiglione's Il Cortegiano (1528); Giovanni della Casa's Il Galateo (1558) and Stefano Guazzo's La Civil Conversazione (1574) in four volumes – had an especially wide influence both south and north of the Alps. Charles V, Holy Roman Emperor, apparently had at his bedside three books: the Bible, Niccolò Machiavelli's The Prince, and Il Cortegiano (The Courtier ). Through Castiglione's writings, the Italian ideals of Neo-Platonism, beauty and symmetry, and the amateur author, reached a wide humanist audience, as did the new Italianate emphasis on the self in society and the importance of social appearances.

The norms for personal boundaries and social proxemics established by figures such as della Casa still influence the Western world almost a half millennium later.

=== English translations and developments ===
In 1561, Thomas Hoby published The Courtyer, his translation of Il Cortegiano, (although he had made the translation a decade earlier). The work was read widely and influenced the writings of Shakespeare, Edmund Spenser and Ben Jonson. Robert Peterson's translation of Il Galateo appeared in 1576. George Pettie translated the first three books of Guazzo's work into The Civil Conversation in 1581; the fourth and last volume from La Civil Conversazione appeared five years later in a translation by Bartholomew Yonge.

A well-known English example of the genre is Henry Peacham's The Compleat Gentleman of 1622.

== Later developments ==
Courtesy books continued to be written into the 1700s, the last traditional English one being Lord Chesterfield's Letters to His Son – memorably described by Samuel Johnson as teaching "the morals of a whore and the manners of a dancing-master". However they took on a new form in the fiction of the time, much of it (like the work of Sir Charles Grandison) filling a similar normative role.

== See also ==
- Book of Proverbs
- Conduct book
- Courtly love
- De Officiis
- Plutarch
- Thomas Elyot
- Mirrors for princes
