= Baldassare Castiglione =

Italian Renaissance author (1478–1529)

- Portrait of Baldassare Castiglione by Raphael
- Born: 6 December 1478 near Casatico, Margravate of Mantua
- Died: 2 February 1529 (aged 50); Toledo, Spanish Empire
- Occupations: Courtier, diplomat, soldier, author
- Writing career
- Notable work: The Book of the Courtier
- Movement: Renaissance

Baldassare Castiglione, Count of Casatico (Italian: [baldasˈsaːre kastiʎˈʎoːne]; 6 December 1478 – 2 February 1529), was an Italian courtier, diplomat, soldier and a prominent Renaissance author.

Castiglione wrote Il Cortegiano or The Book of the Courtier, a courtesy book dealing with questions of the etiquette and morality of the courtier. It was very influential in 16th-century European court circles.

== Biography ==
Castiglione was born in Casatico, near Mantua (Lombardy) into a family of the minor nobility, connected through his mother Luigia to the ruling Gonzagas of Mantua.

In 1494, at the age of sixteen, Castiglione was sent to Milan, then under the rule of Duke Ludovico Sforza, to begin his humanistic studies at the school of the renowned teacher of Greek and editor of Homer Demetrios Chalkokondyles (Latinized as Demetrius Calcondila), and Georgius Merula. In 1499, Castiglione's father died unexpectedly and Castiglione returned to Casatico to take his place as the male head of the family. As such, Castiglione's duties included numerous official and diplomatic missions representing the Court of Marquis Francesco II Gonzaga of Mantua, whom Castiglione accompanied in that year in Louis XII of France's royal entry into Milan. On a diplomatic mission to Rome, Castiglione met Francesco Gonzaga's brother-in-law, Guidobaldo da Montefeltro, Duke of Urbino, husband of Francesco's sister Elisabetta Gonzaga; and in 1504, a reluctant Francesco allowed Castiglione to leave and take up residence in that court.

The court of Urbino at that time was considered as one of the most refined and elegant in Italy, a cultural center ably directed and managed by the Duchess Elisabetta and her sister-in-law Emilia Pia, whose portraits, along with those of many of their guests, were painted by Raphael, himself a native of Urbino. Regular guests included: Pietro Bembo; Ludovico da Canossa; Giuliano de' Medici; Cardinal Bibbiena; the brothers Ottaviano and Federigo Fregoso from the Republic of Genoa; Francesco Maria della Rovere (nephew and adopted heir of Duke and Duchess of Urbino); and Cesare Gonzaga, a cousin of both Castiglione and the Duke. The hosts and guests organized intellectual contests, pageants, dances, concerts, recitations, plays, and other cultural activities, producing literary works. Elisabetta's virtue and abilities inspired Castiglione to compose a series of Platonic love songs and sonnets in her honor. She was played to her husband though his invalid state meant they could never have children.

In 1506 Castiglione wrote (and acted in) a pastoral play, his eclogue Tirsi, in which he depicted the court of Urbino allegorically through the figures of three shepherds. The work contains echoes of both ancient and contemporary poetry, recalling Poliziano and Sannazaro as well as Virgil.

Castiglione wrote about his works and of those of other guests in letters to other princes, maintaining an activity very near to diplomacy, though in a literary form, as in his correspondence with his friend and kinsman, Ludovico da Canossa (later Bishop of Bayeux).

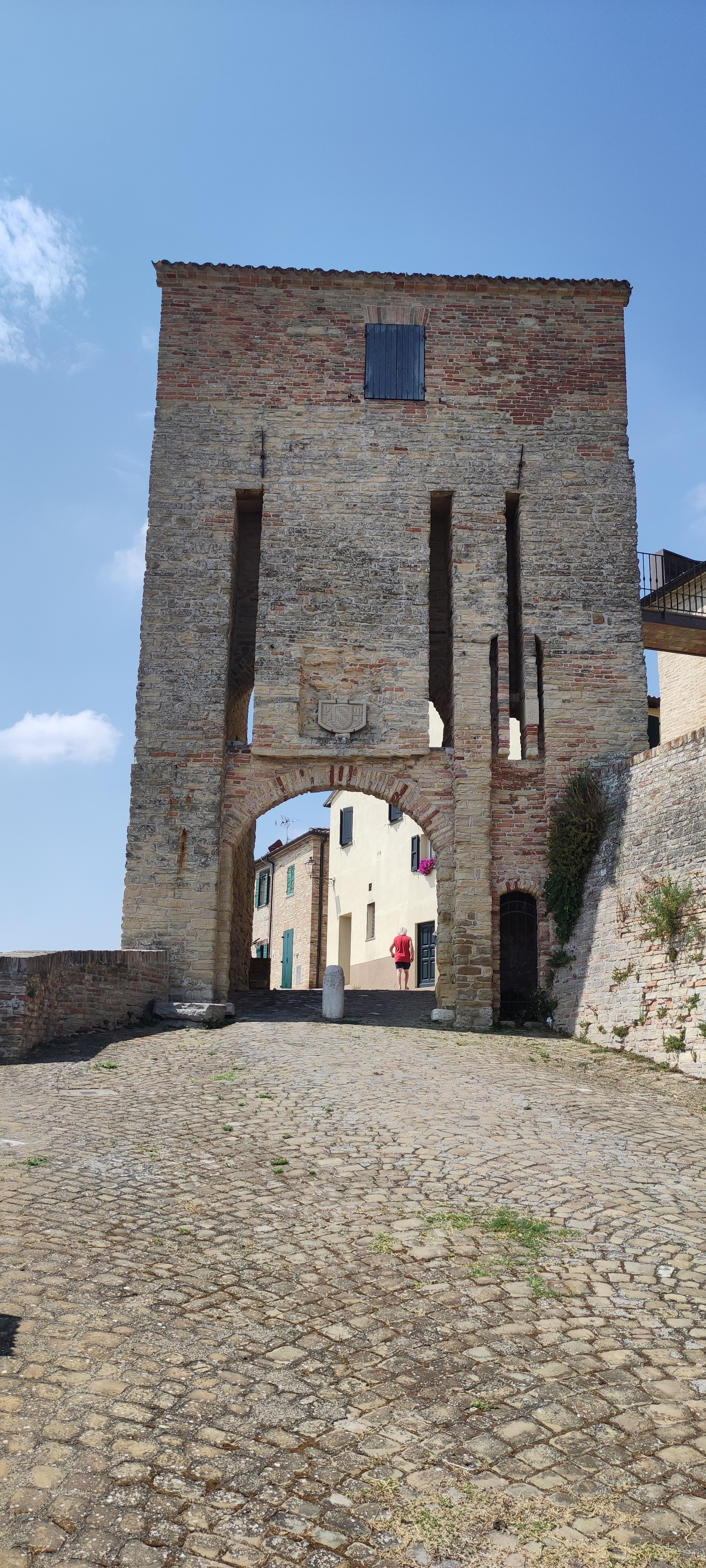
Castello di Novilara

In 1508 Francesco Maria della Rovere succeeded as Duke of Urbino on Guidobaldo's death and Castiglione remained at his court, being posted as envoy to Henry VIII of England. He and the new Duke, who had been appointed capitano generale (commander-in-chief) of the Papal States, took part in Pope Julius II's expedition against Venice, an episode in the Italian Wars. For this the Duke conferred on Castiglione the title of Count of Novilara, a fortified hill town near Pesaro. When Pope Leo X was elected in 1512, Castiglione was sent to Rome as ambassador from Urbino. There he was friendly with many artists and writers; including Raphael, whom he already knew from Urbino, and who frequently sought his advice. In tribute to their friendship, Raphael painted his famous portrait of Castiglione, now at the Louvre.

In 1516 Castiglione was back in Mantua, where he married a very young Ippolita Torelli, descendant of another noble Mantuan family. That Castiglione's love for Ippolita was of a very different nature from his former platonic attachment to Elisabetta Gonzaga is evidenced by the two deeply passionate letters he wrote to her that have survived. Sadly, Ippolita died a mere four years after their marriage, while Castiglione was away in Rome as ambassador for the Duke of Mantua. In 1521 Pope Leo X conceded to him the tonsura (first sacerdotal ceremony) and thereupon began Castiglione's second, ecclesiastical career.

In 1524 Pope Clement VII sent Castiglione to Spain as Apostolic nuncio (ambassador of the Holy See) in Madrid, and in this role he followed court of Emperor Charles V to Toledo, Seville and Granada. In 1527, at the time of the Sack of Rome, Pope Clement VII suspected Castiglione of having harbored a "special friendship" for the Spanish emperor: Castiglione, the pope believed, should have informed the Holy See of Charles V's intentions, for it was his duty to investigate what Spain was planning against the Eternal City. On the other hand, Alfonso de Valdés, twin brother of the humanist Juan de Valdés and secretary of the emperor, publicly declared the sack to have been a divine punishment for the sinfulness of the clergy.

Castiglione answered both the pope and Valdés in two famous letters from Burgos. He took Valdés to task, severely and at length, in his response to the latter's comments about the Sack of Rome. While in his letter to the pope (dated 10 December 1527), he had the audacity to criticize Vatican policies, asserting that its own inconsistencies and vacillations had undermined its stated aim of pursuing a fair agreement with the emperor and had provoked Charles V to attack.

Against all expectations, Castiglione received the pope's apologies and the emperor honored him with the offer of the position of Bishop of Avila. Historians today believe that Castiglione had carried out his ambassadorial duties to Spain in an honorable manner and bore no responsibility for the sack of Rome. He died of the plague in Toledo in 1529.

After his death in 1529 a monument was erected to him in the sanctuary of Santa Maria delle Grazie, outside his birthplace of Mantua. It was designed by the mannerist painter and architect Giulio Romano, a pupil of Raphael, and inscribed with the following words:

Baldassare Castiglione of Mantua, endowed by nature with every gift and the knowledge of many disciplines, learned in Greek and Latin literature, and a poet in the Italian (Tuscan) language, was given a castle in Pesaro on account of his military prowess, after he had conducted embassies to both great Britain and Rome. While he was working at the Spanish court on behalf of Clement VII, he drew up the Book of the Courtier for the education of the nobility; and in short, after Emperor Charles V had elected him Bishop of Avila, he died at Toledo, much honored by all the people. He lived fifty years, two months, and a day. His mother, Luigia Gonzaga, who to her own sorrow outlived her son, placed this memorial to him in 1529.

== The Book of the Courtier ==
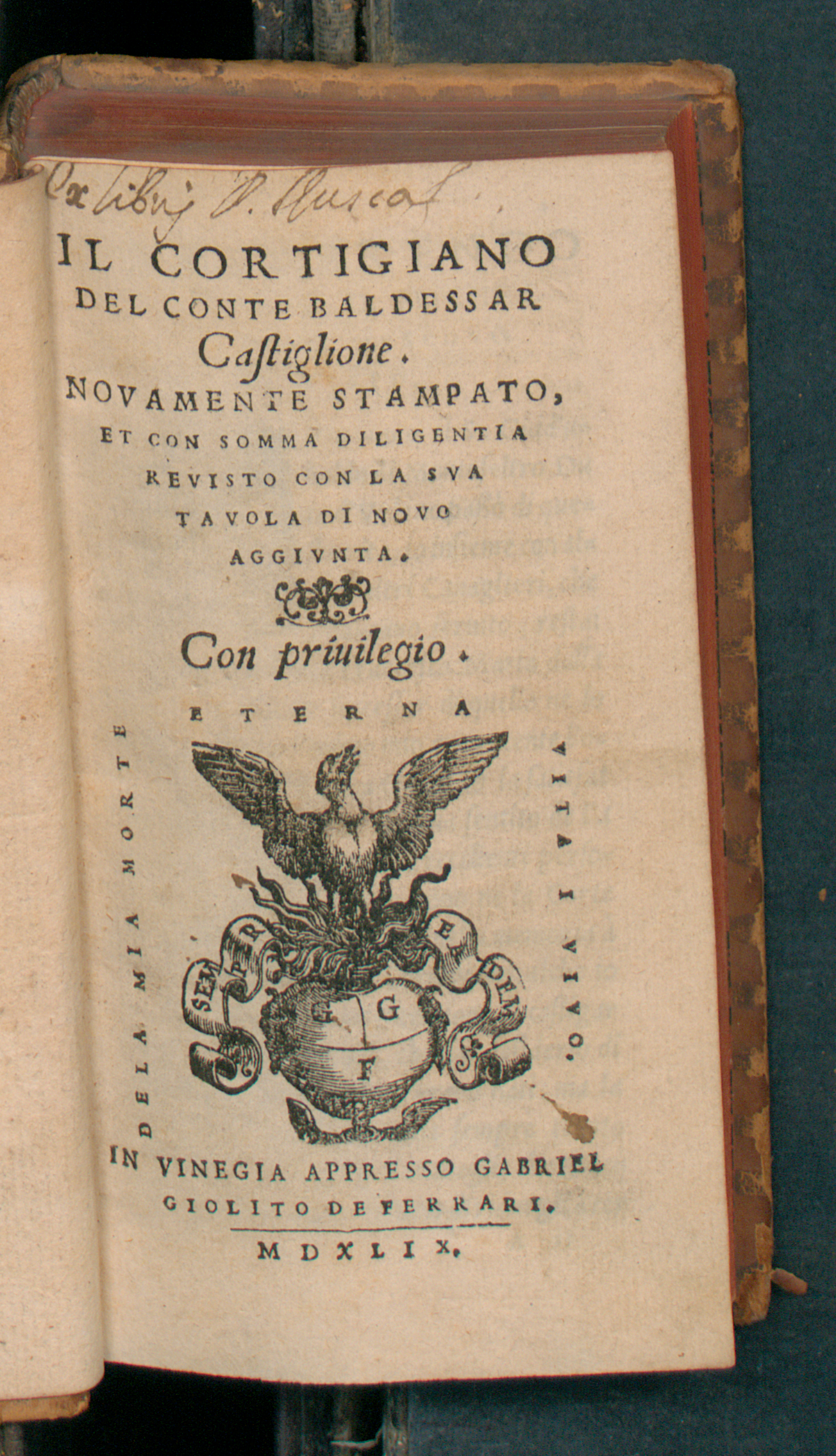
"Il Cortigiano, Del Conte Baldessar Castiglione. Novamente stampato, et con somma diligentia revisto con la sua tavola di novo aggiunta. Con priuilegio. In Vinegia [Venice], appresso Gabriel Giolito de Ferrari MDXLIX" (1549)

The Humanist spirit, with its longing to embrace and fuse the variety and confusion of life, fills that Renaissance conversation – at once so formal and so free, so schooled and spontaneous, so disciplined in design and convivial in movement – with an ardent vision of the one virtue of which human nature is normally capable: that of moral urbanity. And it is this virtue which women lend to society. They are the custodians of the social covenant. In the code of the Courtier the Renaissance woman comes into her own and the mission which Isabella [of Este, Marchesa of Mantua, known as the "first lady of the Renaissance"] pursued amid the strenuous turmoil of actual life is realized, in these animated pages, by her passive sister-in-law Elizabetta. Though she takes no part in the conversation, she presides over it, and her presence permeates its conduct. The men defer to her, especially in their conduct with women – "with whom we had the freest and commerce, but such was the respect we bore to the will of the Duchess that freedom was the greatest restraint."

In 1528, the year before his death, the book for which Castiglione is most famous, The Book of the Courtier (Il Libro del Cortegiano), was published in Venice by the Aldine Press run by the heirs of Aldus Manutius. The book, in dialog form, is an elegiac portrait of the exemplary court of Guidobaldo da Montefeltro of Urbino during Castiglione's youthful stay there at the beginning of the sixteenth century. It depicts an elegant philosophical conversation, presided over by Elisabetta Gonzaga (whose husband, Guidobaldo, an invalid, was confined to bed) and her sister-in-law Emilia Pia. Castiglione himself does not contribute to the discussion, which is imagined as having occurred while he was away. The book is Castiglione's memorial tribute to life at Urbino and to his friendships with the other members of the court, all of whom went on to have important positions and many of whom had died by the time the book was published, giving poignancy to their portrayals.

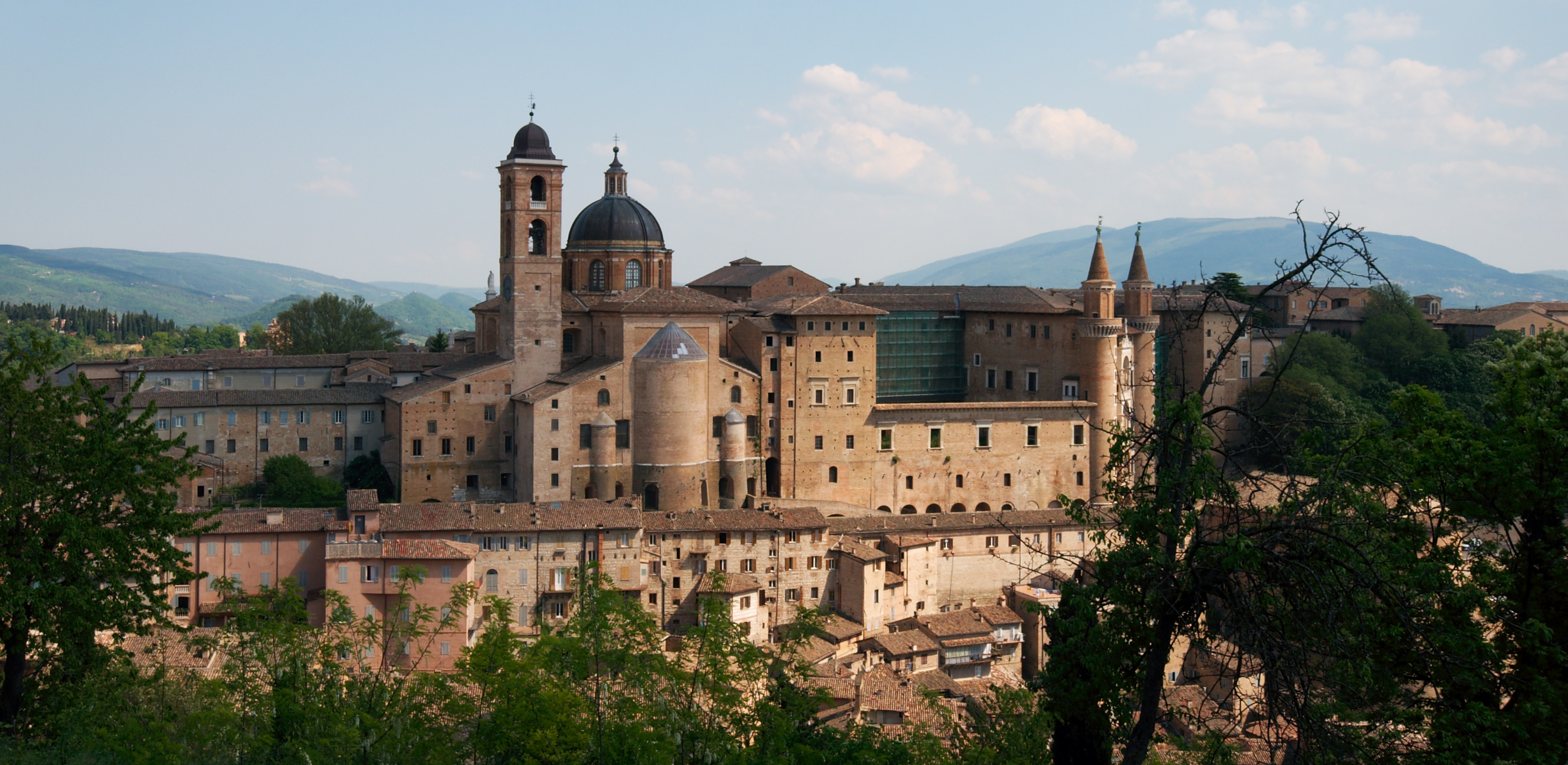
The Ducal Palace at Urbino, setting of the Book of the Courtier.

The conversation takes place over a span of four days in the year 1507, while Castiglione was supposedly absent on an embassy to England. It addresses the topic, proposed by Federigo Fregoso, of what constitutes an ideal Renaissance gentleman. In the Middle Ages, the perfect gentleman had been a chivalrous knight who distinguished himself by his prowess on the battlefield. Castiglione's book changed that. Now the perfect gentleman had to have a classical education in Greek and Latin letters, as well. The Ciceronian humanist model of the ideal orator (whom Cicero called "the honest man"), on which The Courtier is based, prescribes for the orator an active political life of service to country, whether in war or peace. Scholars agree that Castiglione drew heavily from Cicero's celebrated treatise De Officiis ("The Duties of a Gentleman"), well known throughout the Middle Ages, and even more so from his De Oratore, which had been rediscovered in 1421 and which discusses the formation of an ideal orator-citizen. Jennifer Richards points out that the question put forth by De Oratore, namely, can rhetoric be taught or is it an inborn gift, parallels that of The Courtier. The genre is also the same in The Courtier and De Oratore: a comfortable, informal, open-ended discussion, in Ciceronian rhetoric called sermo (conversation), in which the speakers set out the various sides of an argument in a friendly (rather than adversarial) way, inviting readers, as silent participators, to decide the truth for themselves.

Early Italian humanism had been a product of independent city-republics, most notably Florence. Hans Baron famously called it a "civic humanism". But when Castiglione wrote, these republics were being replaced by princely courts." According to historian Peter Burke, one way of summarizing Castiglione's achievement "in a sentence", "would be to say that he helped adapt humanism to the world of the court and the court to humanism." The aim of Castiglione's ideal Renaissance gentleman was not self-cultivation for its own sake but in order to participate in an active life of public service, as recommended by Cicero. To do this he had to win the respect and friendship of his peers and most importantly of a ruler, or prince, i.e., he had to be a courtier, so as to be able to offer valuable assistance and disinterested advice on how to rule the city. He must be a worthy friend, accomplished – in sports, in telling jokes, in fighting, writing poetry, playing music, drawing, and dancing – but not too much. To his moral elegance (his personal goodness) must be added the spiritual elegance conferred by familiarity with good literature (i.e., the humanities, including history). Furthermore, he must excel in all he does without apparent effort and make everything look easy and natural. In a famous passage, Castiglione's friend Lodovico da Canossa, whose views arguably represent Castiglione's own, explains "the mysterious source of courtly gracefulness, the quality which makes the courtier seem a natural nobleman": sprezzatura. Sprezzatura, or the art that conceals art (in the words of another ancient rhetorician, Quintilian), is not simply a kind of superficial dissimulation, for grace may also be the result of such assiduous practice that what one does becomes second nature and seems inborn. At the outset of the discussion Canossa also insists that the art of being a perfect courtier is something that cannot be taught (that is, broken down to a set of rules or precepts), and therefore, he declares (rhetorically – and with sprezzatura) that he will refuse to teach it. The implication, however, is that those interested in acquiring this art must do so through practice and imitation, which is (like the dialog itself) a form of teaching – teaching without precepts. To perfect oneself is not selfish, but fulfills a public and private moral duty for the individual to act as a model for others.

The ideal courtier, then, must act with noble sprezzatura, and Canossa maintains that because the ideal courtier must be a man of arms, skilled in horsemanship, he needs to be of noble birth. To this, another interlocutor, a very youthful Gaspare Pallavicino, objects that many outstanding and virtuous men have been of humble origins. The other participants eventually agree that even someone who is lowly born can be a perfect courtier, since nobility can be learned through imitation of the best models from life and history until it becomes ingrained and natural. This, at least, is the theory; but in practice, they concede, it is easier to become a perfect courtier if one is born into a distinguished family. In any case, the ideal courtier should be able to speak gracefully and appropriately with people of all stations in life. The French are wrong to assert that a knowledge of letters conflicts with fighting ability. The courtier should be deeply versed in Greek and Latin and should know enough to be able to discriminate between good and bad writing (as well as the other arts) for himself, without relying slavishly on the word of others. The participants also deplore what they consider the rude and uncultivated manners of the French, who they say look down with disdain on what they call a "clerk" (or someone who can read and write), though hope is expressed for Francis of Valois, the future king of France. This is a bitter topic, since the French, who had just invaded Italy, had shown themselves clearly superior in fighting to the Italians. It is noticeable, however, that though skill in fighting is insisted on at the outset as a requisite for the Italian courtier, it is scarcely alluded to in the rest of the book. Pietro Bembo, who was a poet and arbiter of elegance in the Italian language, in fact, even questions whether it is necessary.

Ideally, the courtier should be young, aged about twenty-seven, at least mentally, though he should give the appearance of being graver and more thoughtful than his years. To this end he should wear subdued rather than bright colors, though in general attire he should follow the prevalent customs of his surroundings. The courtier should always appear a little more humble than his station requires. He should take care not appear scornful of the efforts of others and should avoid the arrogance shown by some French and some Spanish noblemen.

The discussion also touches on a variety of other questions, such as which form of government is best, a republic or a principality – the Genoese Fregoso brothers taking the republican side, since Genoa had long had a republican government. There is a long discussion, too, about what are appropriate topics for joking (pleasantries), an essential component of pleasing conversation: one should not mock people's physical attributes, for example.

Music is brought up, and Ludovico Canossa declares that the courtier should be able to read music and play several instruments. When the young Lombard nobleman Gaspare Pallavicino objects that music is effeminate, Canossa answers that there is no better way to soothe the soul and raise the spirits than through music, and he names great generals and heroes of antiquity who were keen musicians. Grave Socrates himself began to learn the cithern when an old man. Indeed, the wisest ancient philosophers taught that the heavens themselves are composed of music and there is a harmony of the spheres. Music likewise promotes habits of harmony and virtue in the individual and should therefore be learned beginning in childhood. Giuliano de' Medici agrees that for the courtier music is not just an ornament but a necessity, as it is indeed for men and women in all walks of life. The ideal courtier, however, should not give the impression that music is his main occupation in life.

They then discuss which is superior, painting or sculpture? The answer is left open but seems to lean in favor of painting, for, as Canossa maintains:

Anyone who does not esteem the art of painting seems to me to be quite wrong-headed. For when all is said and done, the very fabric of the universe, which we can contemplate in the vast spaces of heaven, so resplendent with their shooting stars, with the earth at its center, girdled by the seas, varied with mountains, rivers and valleys, and adorned with so many different varieties of trees, lovely flowers and grasses, can be said to be a great and noble painting, composed by Nature and the hand of God. And, in my opinion, whoever can imitate it deserves the highest praise.

Another topic, that of the Court Lady, brings up the question of the equality of the sexes. One character, Gaspare Pallavicino, has been depicted throughout the discussion as a thorough-going misogynist (at one point he even declares that women are only good for having children). Elisabetta Gonzaga and Emilia Pia regard his attitude as a challenge and call on the others to come to women's defense. The following evening Giuliano di Lorenzo de' Medici, who at age 28 is a bit more mature than Gaspare Pallavicino, is chosen to defend women. He rises to the occasion, affirming their equality to the male sex in every respect, and he points out how throughout history some women have excelled in philosophy and others have waged war and governed cities, listing the heroines of classical times by name. Pallavicino, piqued, hints that Giuliano is wrong, but in the end concedes that he himself has been wrong to disparage women. The reader is led to conclude that Pallavicino's bitterness toward the female sex may be the result of a sincere young man's deep disappointment in love, and this throws into question somewhat the sincerity of the smooth and affable Giuliano, the defender (or flatterer, as Pallavicino suggests) of women. There is some doubt as to whether Pallavicino or Giuliano, or both, express Castiglione's real views on the subject of women. Giuliano de' Medici was also the person to whom Machiavelli had first planned to address his book The Prince, though due to Giuliano's death it was instead dedicated to his nephew, Lorenzo. Giuliano was later given the title of Duc de Nemours by King Francis I of France. He died soon after, in 1517, and was memorialized in a celebrated statue by Michelangelo. Gaspare Pallavicino, the most impetuous and emotional of the interlocutors in The Courtier, was a relation of Castiglione's and the fictional "source" who later recounted the discussions to the supposedly absent Castiglione (who had in fact returned to Urbino from England shortly before the dialogue's fictive date).

The book ends on an elevated note with lengthy speech about love by the humanist scholar Pietro Bembo (later a Cardinal). Bembo was born in 1470 and in 1507, when the dialog is supposed to have taken place, would have been in his mid-thirties. Young men's love naturally tends to be sensual, but Bembo talks about a kind of imaginative, non-physical love that is available to young and old alike. Bembo's speech is based on Marsilio Ficino's influential commentaries on Socrates's speech on the nature of love at the conclusion of Plato's Symposium, except that in The Courtier the object of love is heterosexual not homosexual. Bembo describes how the experience of sublimated love leads the lover to the contemplation of ideal beauty and ideas. He talks about the divine nature and origin of love, the "father of true pleasures, of all blessings, of peace, of gentleness, and of good will: the enemy of rough savagery and vileness", which ultimately lifts the lover to the contemplation of the spiritual realm, leading to God. When Bembo has finished, the others notice that they have all become so enraptured by his speech that they have lost track of the time, and they rise to their feet, astonished to discover that day is already dawning:

So when the windows on the side of the palace that faces the lofty peak of Mount Catria had been opened, they saw that the dawn had already come to the east, with the beauty and color of a rose, and all the stars had been scattered, save only the lovely mistress of heaven, Venus, who guards the confines of night and day. From there, there seemed to come a delicate breeze, filling the air with biting cold, and among the murmuring woods on neighboring hills wakening the birds into joyous song. Then all, having taken leave of the Duchess, went to their rooms, without torches, for the light of day was sufficient.

== The Fortunes of the Courtier ==
"Have you read Castiglione's Cortegiano? The beauty of the book is such that it deserves to be read in all ages; and as long as courts endure, as long as princes reign and knights and ladies meet, as long valor and courtesy hold a place in our hearts, the name of Castiglione will be held in honor.” Torquato Tasso, Il Malpiglio overo de la corte (1585)

The Book of the Courtier caught the "spirit of the times" and was speedily translated into Spanish, German, French, Polish, and English. One hundred and eight editions were published between 1528 and 1616 alone. (Pietro Aretino's La cortigiana is a parody of this famous work.) Castiglione's depiction of how the ideal gentleman should be educated and behave remained, for better or for worse, the touchstone of behavior for all the upper classes of Europe for the next five centuries. It was one of many Italian dialogues and treatises written during the Renaissance that explored the ideal gentleman, including Stefano Guazzo's Civil Conversation (1581) and the Galateo (1558) by Giovanni Della Casa, the sourcebook for later etiquette guides.

Nowhere was its influence greater than in England, where it was translated by Sir Thomas Hoby in 1561 and is a recognizable source for Shakespeare. In 1572, Edward de Vere, 17th earl of Oxford and one of Elizabeth's courtiers, sponsored Bartholomew Clerke's Latin translation and wrote the Latin foreword to it. Queen Elizabeth's tutor and later secretary, Roger Ascham, wrote that a young man who carefully studied The Book of The Courtier would benefit from it more than from three years travel in Italy. Later commentators have not infrequently accused it of advocating superficiality (with "slight justice" according to historian June Osborne), yet it has also been called "The most important single contribution to a diffusion of Italian values" throughout Europe. The definitive study of reception of The Courtier is Peter Burke's The Fortunes of the Courtier: The European Reception of Castiglione's Cortegiano, Penn State University Press, 1995.

== Minor works ==
Castiglione's minor works are less known, including love sonnets and four Amorose canzoni ("Amorous Songs") about his Platonic love for Elisabetta Gonzaga, in the style of Francesco Petrarca and Pietro Bembo. His sonnet Superbi colli e voi, sacre ruine ("Proud hills and you, sacred ruins"), written more by the man of letters than the poet in Castiglione, nevertheless contains hints of pre-romantic inspiration. It was set to music as a six-part Madrigal by Girolamo Conversi and translated by, among others, Edmund Spenser and Joachim du Bellay.

Castiglione also produced a number of Latin poems, together with an elegy for the death of Raphael entitled De morte Raphaellis pictoris and another elegy, after the manner of Petrarca, in which he imagines his dead wife, Ippolita Torelli, as writing to him. In Italian prose, he wrote a prologue for Cardinal Bibbiena's Calandria, which was performed in 1507 at Urbino and later, elaborately, at Rome.

Castiglione's letters not only reveal the man and his personality but also delineate those of famous people he had met and his diplomatic activities: they constitute a valuable resource for political, literary, and historical studies.

== Collections ==
University College London holds a significant collection of editions of The Book of the Courtier, totalling over 100 items. The collection was donated to the University in 1921 by Sir Herbert Thompson as part of a wider donation of books. In 1949, the collection was expanded by a donation from Huxley St John Brooks.

== See also ==
- Fabritio Caroso
