= Portrait of Emilia Pia da Montefeltro =

16th-century painting

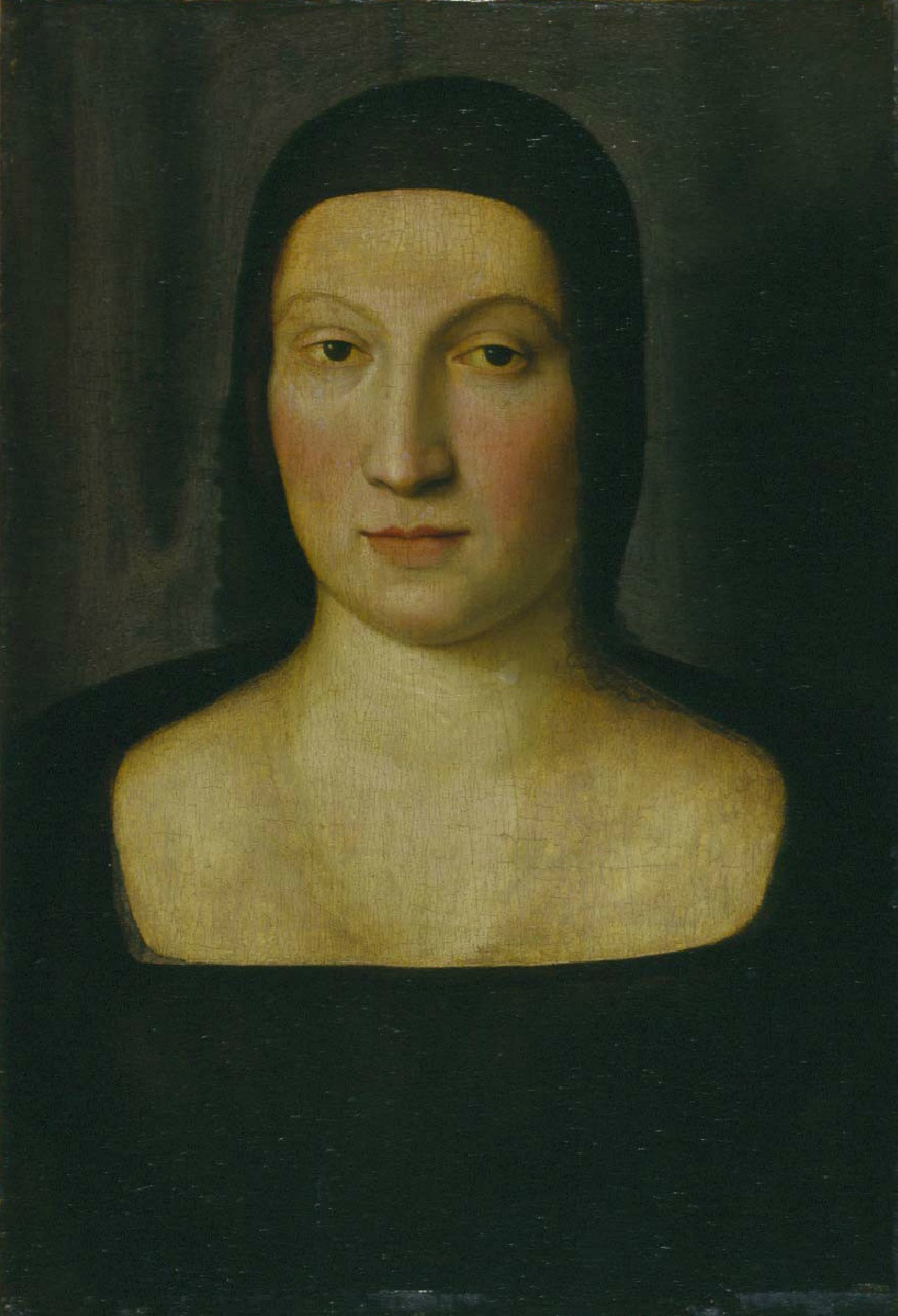
- Artist: Raphael
- Year: c. 1504–1505
- Medium: Oil on wood
- Dimensions: 58 cm × 36 cm (23 in × 14 in)
- Location: Baltimore Museum of Art, Baltimore

The Portrait of Emilia Pia da Montefeltro is a picture from around 1504–1505, attributed by some to the Italian Renaissance artist Raphael and housed by the Baltimore Museum of Art, United States

== History ==
The rear of the work has an inscription saying "Emilia Pia da Montefeltro" and a seal with a fragmentary line, usually interpreted as "[Fo]ntico tedescho di V[enezia]", i.e. the Fondaco dei Tedeschi in Venice.

The painting was perhaps part of the ducal collection of Urbino, brought to Florence in 1625 as a part of Vittoria della Rovere's dowry. Later it was in Vienna, then in Erlenbach, near Zurich, and was later sold to the Kleinberger Gallery in New York, USA, whence it arrived to the current seat.

The identification with the subject (the wife of Antonio da Montefeltro, described in Baldassarre Castiglione's Book of the Courtier) is confirmed by a medal attributed to Adriano Fiorentino. However, the attribution to Raphael remains disputed, in a similar way than the Portrait of Elisabetta Gonzaga of the Uffizi. Emilia Pia was in fact a confidant of Elisabetta Gonzaga, and perhaps her portrait was executed to emulate the former's.

== See also ==
- La donna gravida

== Sources ==
- De Vecchi, Pierluigi (1975). Raffaello. Milan: Rizzoli.
