= Margarita Bobba =

Italian writer

Margarita Bobba (fl. 1560), was a writer and noblewoman of Casale Monferrato, described by Gioseffantonio Morano as possessing an elevated wit and being well versed both in the Latin and Italian languages and in the art of poetry. She published a number of works, and was praised by Stefano Guazzo in his La civil conversazione and by Fulgenzio Alghisi in his history of Monferrato.

== See also ==
- Margarita Balliana and Camilla Soardi a Casalese poet of the same milieu.
