= Margarita Balliana =

Italian poet

Margarita Balliana (fl. 1680) was a Renaissance woman of letters from Casale Monferrato in north-west Italy. She received a good education in philosophy and history and was described by Gioseffantonio Morano as ‘illustrious for the fineness of her talents’. She published various poems in Latin and in Italian and was praised by Stefano Guazzo, the most prominent writer of Renaissance Casale, and by Fulgenzio Alghisi, the historian of Monferrato. She married Federico Prato, a senator of Monferrato.

== See also ==
- Margarita Bobba and Camilla Soardi, also female poets of sixteenth-century Casale.
