= Camillo Castiglione =

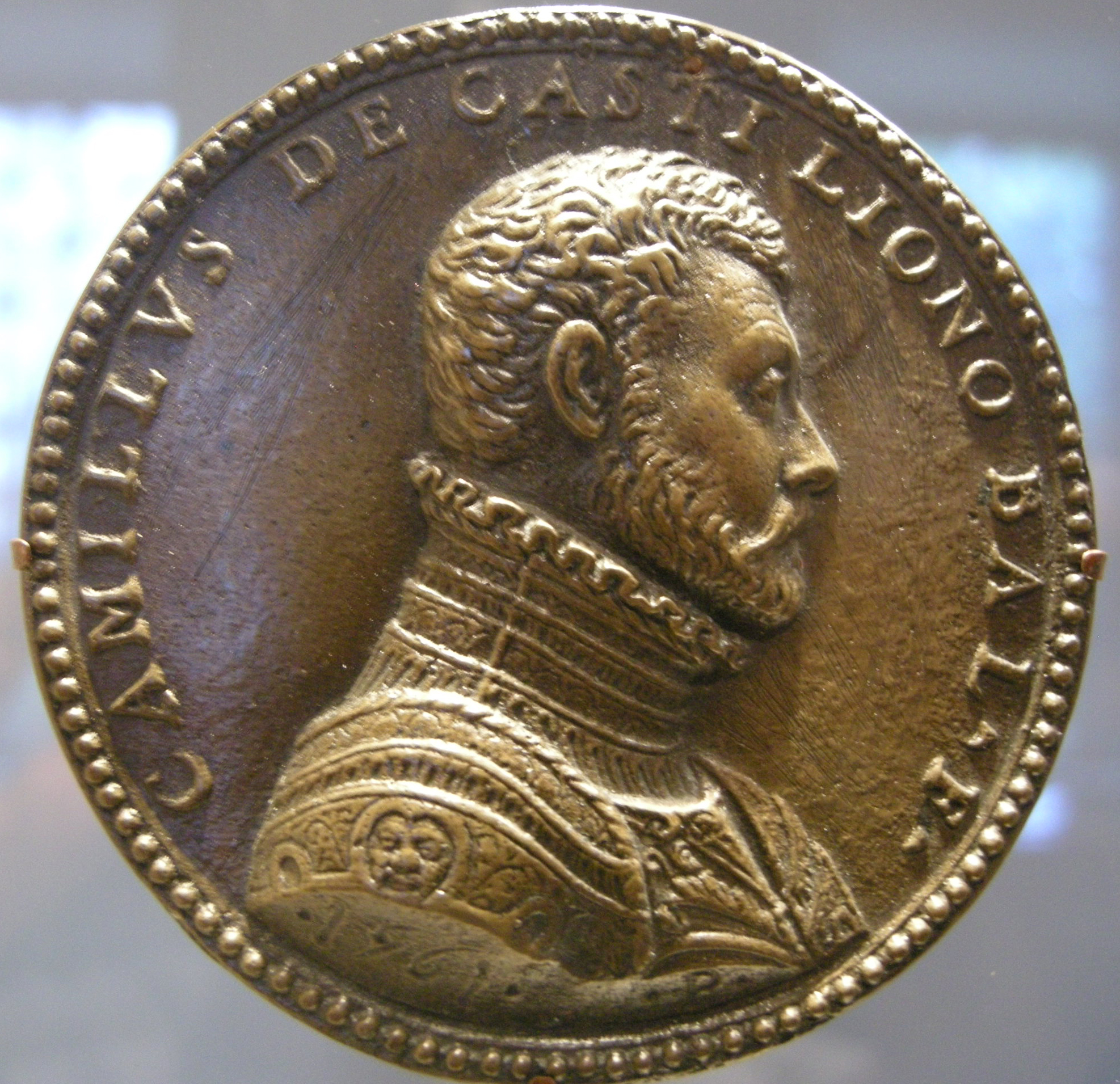
Medal of Camillo by Pastorino dei Pastorini (1561)

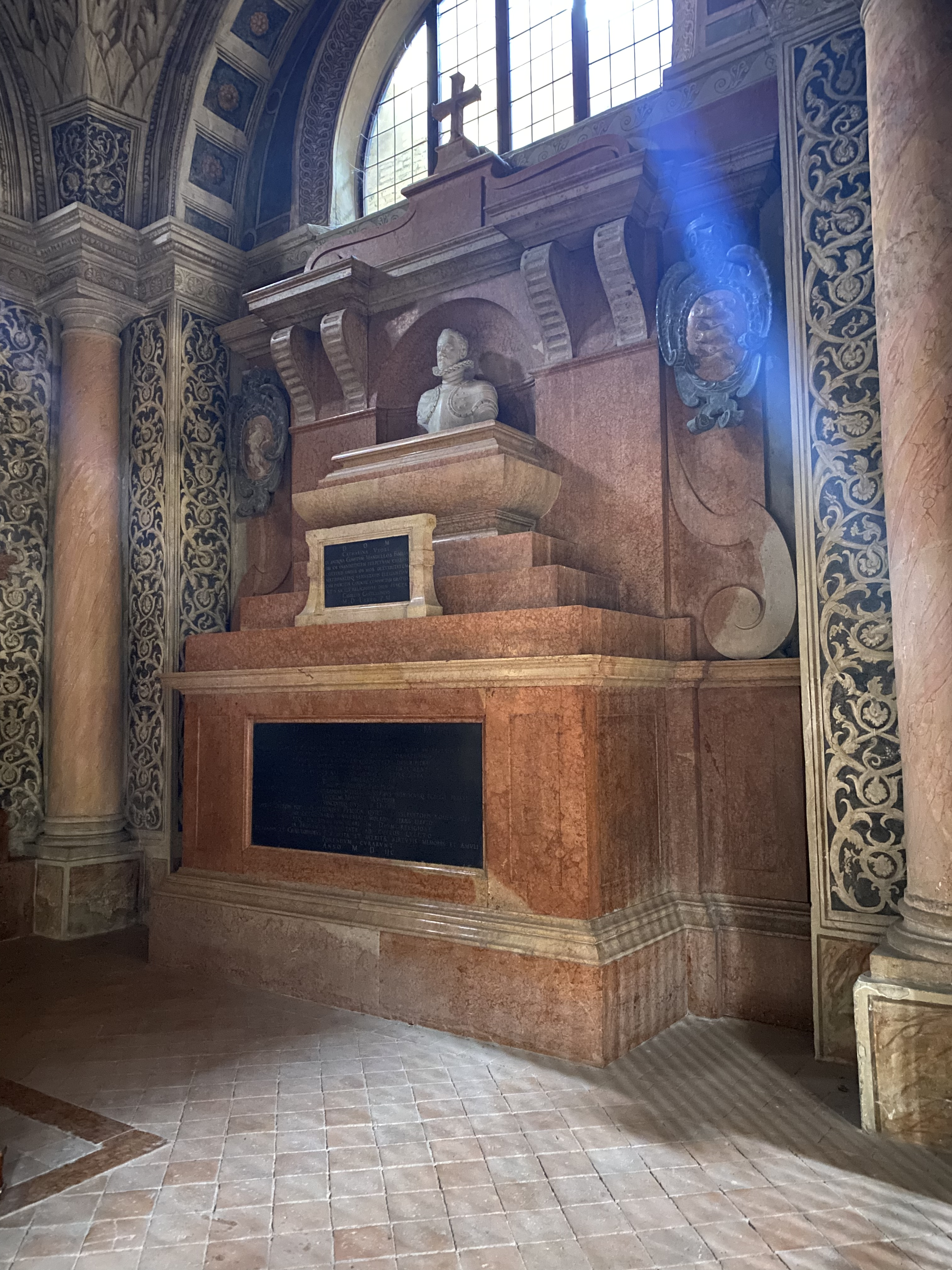
Camillo's funerary chapel

Camillo Castiglione or Castiglioni (3 August 1517 – 6 January 1598) was an Italian nobleman and condottiero.

== Life ==
A son of the writer Baldassarre Castiglione and his wife Ippolita Torelli and after his father's death grew up under the protection of the House of Gonzaga.

In 1534 he was in the service of Charles V, Holy Roman Emperor, fighting alongside Ferrante Gonzaga in Flanders and beside Alfonso III d'Avalos in 1544. He became Guglielmo Gonzaga's ambassador to the papal court in 1550. He next entered the service of the Duchy of Urbino before being made governor of the Marquisate of Monferrato in 1582.

== Marriage and issue ==
Camillo married Caterina dei conti Mandelli from Piacenza (1537–1582), with whom he had three children:

- Cristoforo (?-1605), soldier and governor of Monferrato
- Baldassarre, knight of the Order of Saint Stephen and lord of Casatico
- Giulia Camilla, nun
