= Ippolita Torelli =

Noblewoman and poet from Bologna (1501-1520)

Ippolita Torelli (24 February 1501 - 25 August 1521) was a noblewoman and poet from Bologna, also notable as the wife of the writer Baldassarre Castiglione.

== Life ==
She was a daughter of Guido Torelli and Francesca Bentivoglio, making her a member of the House of the Lords of Bologna and a cousin of Barbara Torelli.

Aged 15, on 19 October 1516 in Mantua, she married Baldassare Castiglione, aged 38, a marriage favoured by his mother Luigia Gonzaga (1458–1542) and by the marchioness of Mantua Isabella d'Este and the consent of marquess Francesco II Gonzaga. Castiglione celebrated his wife's virtue in a poem and they are portrayed together full-length in the 'Gran Sala' of Corte Castiglioni in Casatico di Marcaria and in a small painting on panel now in a private collection. The birth of their first child was marked by a novella by the poet Matteo Bandello.

She died soon after her third child's birth and was buried in the Sanctuary of the Beata Vergine delle Grazie at the gates of Mantua in a tomb designed by Giulio Romano and with an inscription by her husband, with the second paragraph added by Pietro Bembo:

NON EGO NUNC VIRO CONIUNGX

DULCISSIMA VITAM CORPORE NAMQUE TUO FATA MEAM ABSTULERUNT SED VIVAM TUMULO CUM TECUM CONDAR IN ISTO IUNGENTURQUE TUIS OSSIBUS OSSA MEA.

HIPOLITAE TAURELLAE QUAE IN AMBIGUO RELIQUIT UTRUM PULCRIOR AN CASTIOR FUERIT PRIMOS JUVENTAE ANNO VIX INGRESSA BALDASSAR CASTILION INSATIABILITER MOERENS POSUIT

ANNO D. M. C. XX.

— Baldassare Castiglione and Pietro Bembo

He was buried with her in 1529.

== Issue ==
Ippolita and Baldassarre had three children:

- Camillo (3 August 1517 – 1598), condottiero commanding the Gonzaga army, married Caterina Mandelli; in 1582 made governor of the marquisate of Monferrato.
- Anna (17 July 1518 - ?), married Alessandro d'Arco then Antonio Ippoliti di Gazoldo
- Ippolita (14 August 1520 - ?), married Ercole Turchi di Ferrara, a knight

== Omaggi poetici e letterari ==
The poet Matteo Bandello dedicated to Ippolita Torelli la Novella II in the second part (1554) and the Novella LXVII in the third part (1554).

== Bibliography ==
- Carnazzi, Giulio (1987). Baldassar Castiglione, il libro del cortegiano (in Italian). ISBN 9788858617618.
