= Medieval literature =

Literary works of the Middle Ages

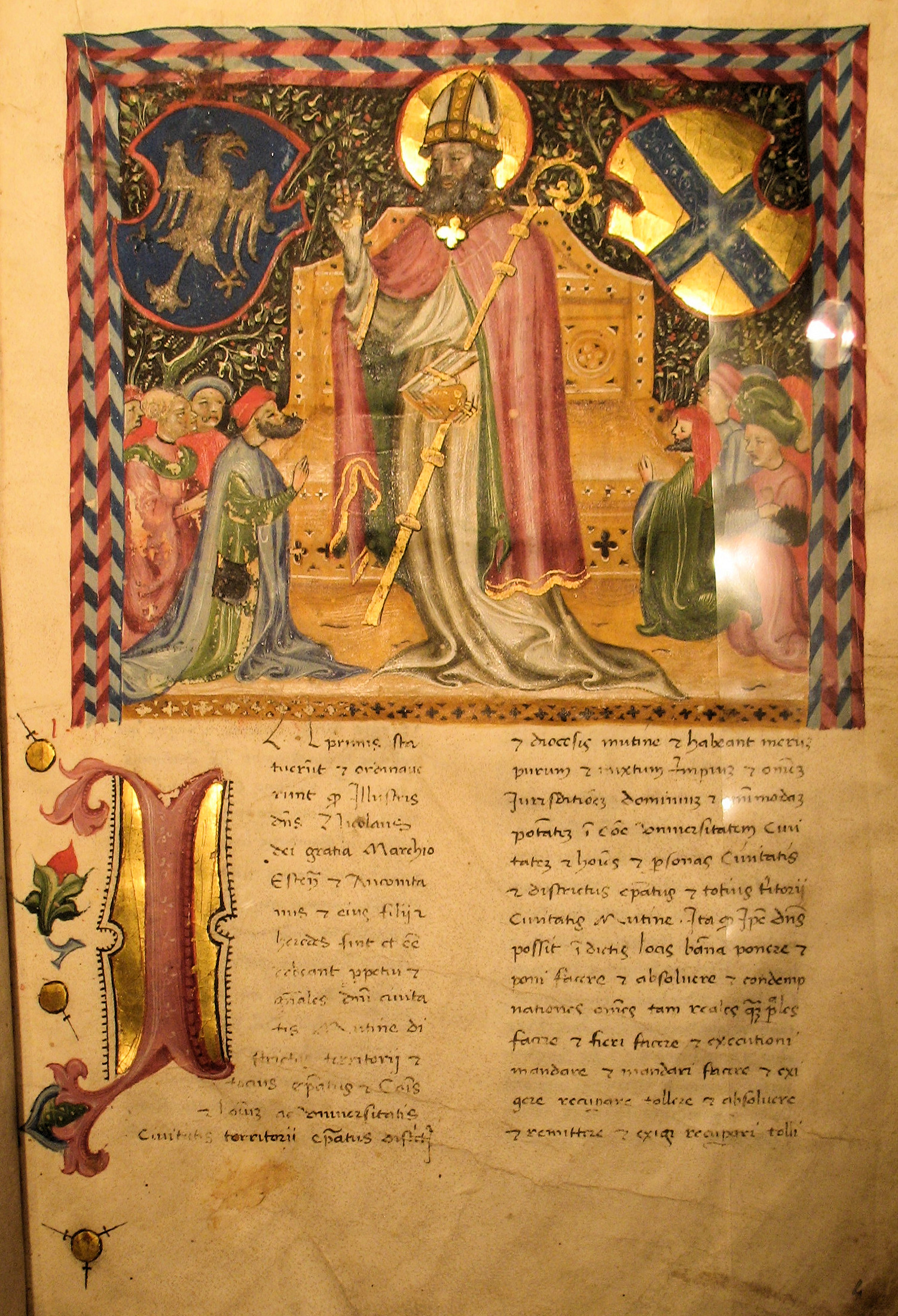
Statuta Mutine Reformata, 1420–1485; parchment codex bound in wood and leather with brass plaques worked the corners and in the center, with clasps.

Medieval literature is a broad subject, encompassing essentially all written works available in Europe and beyond during the Middle Ages, from the earlier variety of late antique literature which saw a major evolution of literary styles following the period of classical antiquity, until the beginnings of the Renaissance. The literature of this time was composed of religious writings as well as secular works. Like modern literature, it is a broad field of study, from the utterly sacred to the exuberantly profane, touching all points in between. Works of literature are often grouped by place of origin, language, and genre.

== Languages ==
Outside of Europe, medieval literature was written in Ethiopic, Syriac, Coptic, Japanese, Chinese, and Arabic, among many other languages.

In Western Europe, Latin was the common language for medieval writing, since Latin was the language of the Roman Catholic Church, which dominated Western and Central Europe, and since the Church was virtually the only source of education. This was the case even in some parts of Europe that were never Romanized.

In Eastern Europe, the influence of the Eastern Roman Empire and the Eastern Orthodox Church made Greek and Old Church Slavonic the dominant written languages.

In Europe the common people used their respective vernaculars. A few examples, such as the Old English Beowulf, the Middle High German Nibelungenlied, the Medieval Greek Digenis Acritas, the Old East Slavic Tale of Igor's Campaign, and the Old French Chanson de Roland, are well known to this day. Although the extant versions of these epics are generally considered the works of individual (but anonymous) poets, there is no doubt that they are based on their peoples' older oral traditions. Celtic traditions have survived in the lais of Marie de France, the Mabinogion and the Arthurian cycles. Another host of vernacular literature has survived in the Old Norse literature and more specifically in the saga literature of Iceland.

== Anonymity ==
A notable proportion of medieval literature is anonymous. The lack of information about authors is due in part to the paucity of documents from this period but also to a medieval conception of the author's role which differs considerably from modern views on authorship (which come from the Romantics). Medieval authors often deeply respected classical writers and the Church Fathers and tended to retell and embellish stories they had heard or read rather than invent new stories. And even when they did invent, they often claimed to be handing down something from an auctor instead. In this light, the names of the authors themselves seemed much less important, and as a result many important works were never properly attributed.

== Types of writing ==
=== Religious ===
Theological works were the dominant form of literature typically found in libraries during the Middle Ages. Catholic clerics were the intellectual center of society in the Middle Ages, and it is their literature that was produced in the greatest quantity.

Countless hymns survive from this period (both liturgical and paraliturgical). The liturgy itself was not in fixed form, and numerous competing missals set out the mass in varying orders. Religious scholars such as Anselm of Canterbury, Thomas Aquinas, and Pierre Abélard wrote lengthy theological and philosophical treatises, often attempting to reconcile the teachings of the Greek and Roman pagan authors with the doctrines of the Church. Hagiographies, or "lives of the saints", were also frequently written, as an encouragement to the devout and a warning to the wayward.

The Golden Legend of Jacobus de Voragine reached such popularity that, in its time, it was reportedly read more often than the Bible. Francis of Assisi was a prolific poet, and his Franciscan followers frequently wrote poetry themselves as an expression of their piety. Dies Irae and Stabat Mater are two of the most powerful Latin poems on religious subjects. Goliardic poetry (four-line stanzas of satiric verse) was an art form used by some clerics to express dissent. The only widespread religious writing that was not produced by clerics were the mystery plays: growing out of simple tableaux re-enactments of a single Biblical scene, each mystery play became its village's expression of the key events in the Bible. The text of these plays was often controlled by local guilds, and performances were held regularly on set feast-days, often lasting all day long and into the night.

During the Middle Ages, the Jewish population of Europe also produced a number of outstanding writers. Maimonides (born in Cordoba, Spain) and Rashi (born in Troyes, France) are two of the best-known and most influential of these Jewish authors.

=== Secular ===
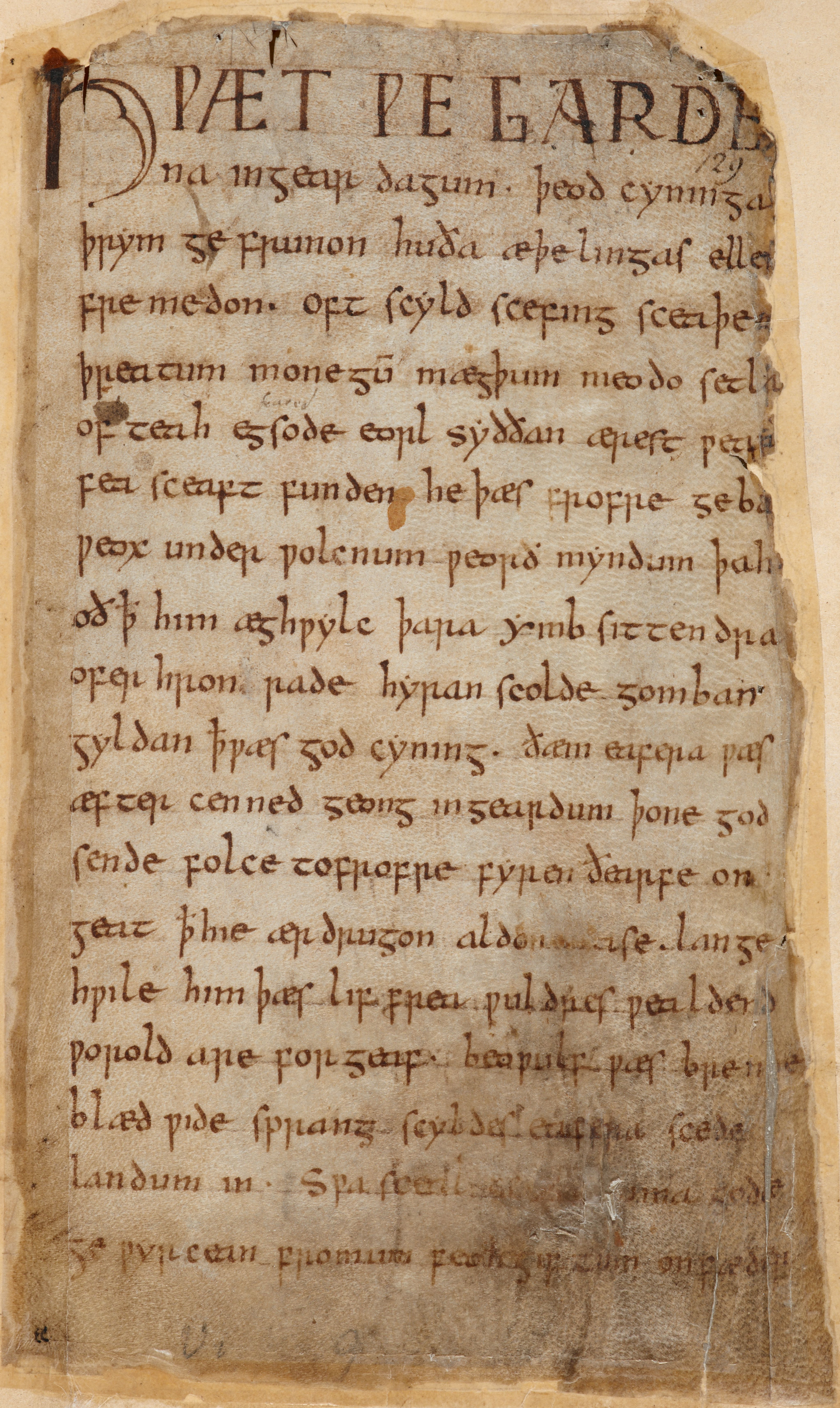
The first page of Beowulf

Secular literature in this period was produced in smaller volume than religious literature. The earliest tales originate from oral traditions: the British Y Gododdin and Preiddeu Annwfn, along with the Germanic Beowulf and Nibelungenlied. They recount myths or events of the distant past (6th century), with the surviving manuscripts dating from centuries later—Y Gododdin from the late 13th century, Preiddu Annwfn from the early 14th century, Beowulf from c. 1000, and the Nibelungenlied from the 13th century. The makers and performers were bards (British/Welsh) and scops (Germanic), elite professionals attached to royal or noble courts to praise the heroes of legendary history.

Prose tales first emerged in Britain: the intricate Four Branches of the Mabinogi about princely families, notably anti-war in theme, and the romantic adventure Culhwch and Olwen. (The Mabinogi is not the same as the Mabinogion, a collection of disconnected prose tales, which does, however, include both the Mabinogi and Culhwch and Olwen.) These works were compiled from earlier oral tradition c. 1100.

At about the same time a new poetry of "courtly love" became fashionable in Europe. Traveling singers—troubadours and trouvères—made a living from their love songs in French, Spanish, Galician-Portuguese, Catalan, Provençal, and Greek. Germanic culture had its Minnesänger tradition. The songs of courtly love often express unrequited longing for an ideal woman, but there are also aubades (dawn farewells by lovers) and humorous ditties.

Following the earliest epic poems, prose tales, and romances, more long poems were crafted—the chansons de geste of the late 11th and early 12th centuries. These extolled conquests, as in The Song of Roland (part of the Matter of France) and Digenis Acritas (one of the Acritic songs). The rather different chivalric romance tradition concerns adventures about marvels, love, and chivalry. They tell of the Matter of Britain and the Matter of Rome.

Political poetry threads throughout the period from the very early Armes Prydein (10th-century Britain) to the goliard rebels of 12th and 13th centuries, who were church trained clerics unable or unwilling to be employed in the church.

Travel literature was widely read in the Middle Ages, as fantastic accounts of far-off lands (frequently embellished or entirely false) entertained a society that supported sea voyages and trading along coasts and rivers, as well as pilgrimages (to Jerusalem, Canterbury, Glastonbury, St. David's, and Santiago de Compostela). Geoffrey Chaucer's Canterbury Tales, a prime example of the genre, became popular at the end of the 14th century.

The most prominent authors of Jewish secular poetry in the Middle Ages were Solomon ibn Gabirol and Yehuda Halevi, both of whom were also renowned religious poets.

=== Women's literature ===
While it is true that women in the medieval period were never accorded full equality with men, some women were able to use their skill with the written word to gain renown. Religious writing was the easiest avenue—women who would later be canonized as saints frequently published their reflections, revelations, and prayers. Much of what is known about women in the Middle Ages is known from the works of nuns such as Clare of Assisi, Bridget of Sweden, and Catherine of Siena.

Frequently, however, the religious views of women were held to be unorthodox by those in power, who were less accepting of those features of medieval life which came to light through the mystical visions of Julian of Norwich, Mechthild of Magdeburg, and Hildegard of Bingen, to name a few. Women wrote influential texts in the secular realm as well—reflections on courtly love and society by Marie de France and Christine de Pizan continue to be studied for their accounts of medieval society.

Some women were patrons of books and owners of significant book collections. Female book collectors in the fifteenth century included Alice Chaucer, Duchess of Suffolk; Cecily Neville, Duchess of York; and Lady Margaret Beaufort, Countess of Richmond and Derby. Lady Margaret Beaufort may also have completed translations as a testament to her piety, as Bishop Father John Fisher noted in a sermon dedicated to her after her death.

For modern historical reflection, D.H. Green's Women Readers of the Middle Ages (2007) examines the ways in which medieval women engaged with the literature of the time. The study has been reviewed as "a radical reassessment of women's contribution to medieval literary culture."

=== Allegory ===
While medieval literature features many literary devices, allegory is so prominent in this period as to deserve special mention. Much of medieval literature employed allegory to impart moral lessons, and is thick with allegorical representations of abstract qualities, events, and institutions. Probably the earliest and most influential allegory is the Psychomachia (Battle of Souls) by Aurelius Clemens Prudentius. Other important examples include the Romance of the Rose, Everyman, Piers Plowman, the Roman de Fauvel, and the Divine Comedy.

== Preservation ==
A recent study estimated that only about 68 percent of all medieval works have survived to the present day, including fewer than 40 percent of English works, around 50 percent of Dutch and French works, and more than three quarters of German, Icelandic, and Irish works.

== Notable literature of the period ==
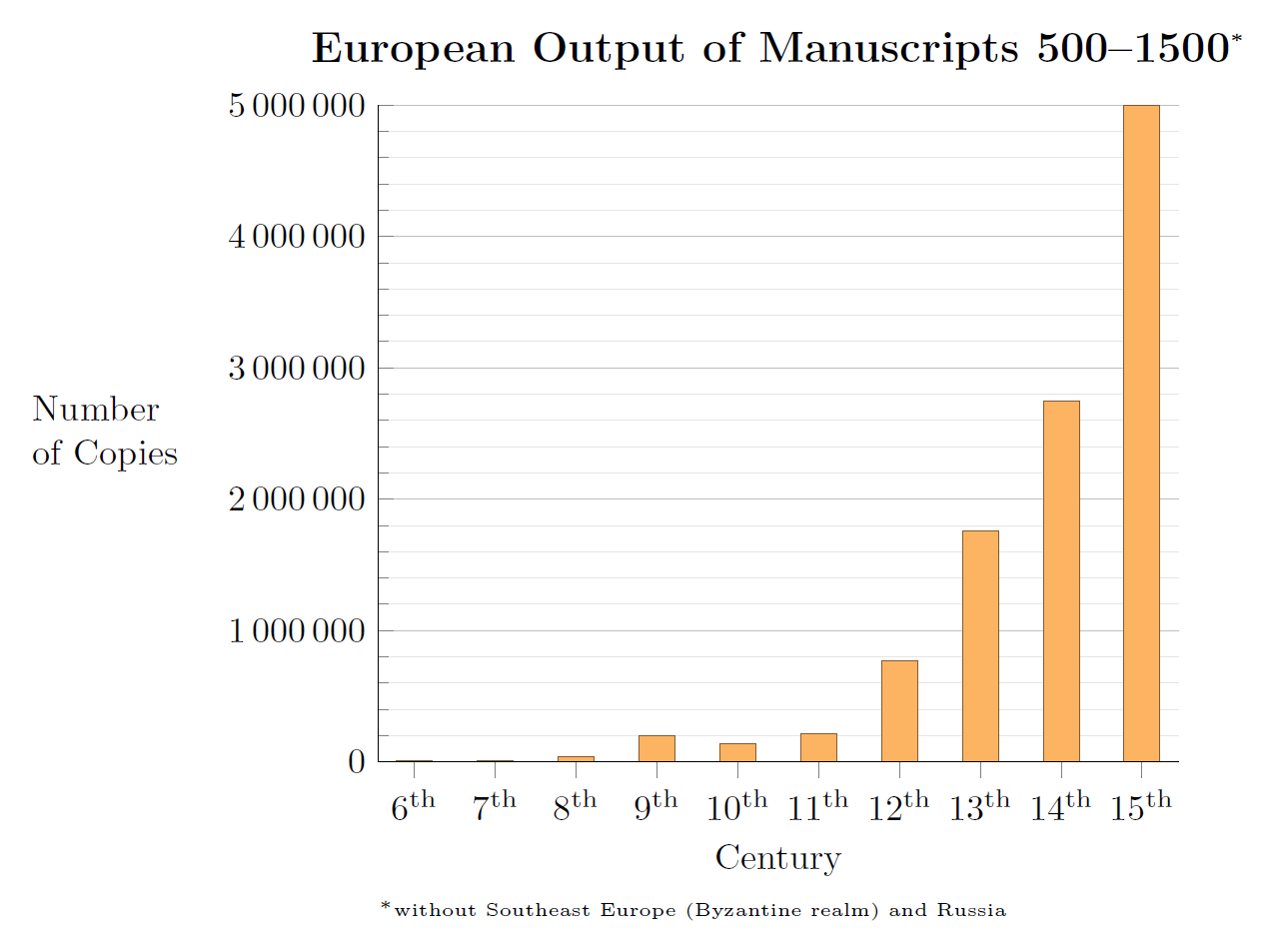
Estimated medieval output of manuscripts in terms of copies

- Alexiad, Anna Comnena
- Beowulf, anonymous Anglo-Saxon author
- Cædmon's Hymn
- Cantigas de Santa Maria, Galician
- The Book of the City of Ladies, Christine de Pizan
- Book of the Civilized Man, Daniel of Beccles
- The Book of Good Love, Juan Ruiz
- The Book of Margery Kempe, Margery Kempe
- Brut, Layamon
- Brut, Wace
- The Canterbury Tales, Geoffrey Chaucer
- Consolation of Philosophy, Boethius
- David of Sassoun, anonymous Armenian author
- Decameron, Giovanni Boccaccio
- The Dialogue, Catherine of Siena
- Digenis Acritas, anonymous Greek author
- The Diseases of Women, Trotula of Salerno
- La divina commedia (The Divine Comedy), Dante Alighieri
- Dukus Horant, the first extended work in Yiddish.
- Elder Edda, various Icelandic authors
- Das fließende Licht der Gottheit, Mechthild of Magdeburg
- First Grammatical Treatise, 12th-century work on Old Norse phonology
- Gesta Danorum, Saxo Grammaticus
- Heimskringla, Snorri Sturluson
- Historia ecclesiastica gentis Anglorum (The Ecclesiastical History of the English People), the Venerable Bede
- Holy Cross Sermons, anonymous Polish author
- The Knight in the Panther's Skin, Shota Rustaveli
- The Lais of Marie de France, Marie de France
- The Letters of Abelard and Heloise
- Libro de los ejemplos del conde Lucanor y de Patronio (Book of the Examples of Count Lucanor and of Patronio), Don Juan Manuel, Prince of Villena
- Ludus de Antichristo, anonymous German author
- Mabinogion, various Welsh authors
- Metrical Dindshenchas, Irish onomastic poems
- Il milione (The Travels of Marco Polo), Marco Polo
- Le Morte d'Arthur, Sir Thomas Malory
- Nibelungenlied, anonymous German author
- Njál's saga, anonymous Icelandic author
- Parzival, Wolfram von Eschenbach
- Piers Plowman, William Langland
- Poem of the Cid, anonymous Spanish author
- Proslogium, Anselm of Canterbury
- Queste del Saint Graal (The Quest of the Holy Grail), anonymous French author
- Revelations of Divine Love, Julian of Norwich
- Le Roman de Perceforest
- Roman de la Rose, Guillaume de Lorris and Jean de Meun
- Sadko, anonymous Russian author
- Scivias, Hildegard of Bingen
- Sic et Non, Abelard
- Sir Gawain and the Green Knight, anonymous English author
- The Song of Roland, anonymous French author
- Spiritual Exercises, Gertrude the Great
- Summa Theologiae, Thomas Aquinas
- Táin Bó Cúailnge, anonymous Irish author
- The Tale of Igor's Campaign, anonymous Russian author
- Tirant lo Blanc, Joanot Martorell
- The Travels of Sir John Mandeville, John Mandeville
- Tristan, Thomas d'Angleterre
- Tristan, Béroul
- Tristan, Gottfried von Strassburg
- Troilus and Criseyde, Geoffrey Chaucer
- Waltharius
- Younger Edda, Snorri Sturluson
- Yvain: The Knight of the Lion, Chrétien de Troyes

== Specific articles ==
=== By region or language ===
- Anglo-Norman literature
- Classical Arabic literature
- Medieval Armenian literature
- Medieval Bosnian literature
- Old Breton literature
- Byzantine literature
- Medieval Bulgarian literature
- Medieval Catalan literature
- Medieval Croatian literature
- Old and Middle Dutch literature
- Old English literature
- Middle English literature
- Early English Jewish literature
- Medieval French literature
- Sicilian School
- Old High German literature
- Middle High German literature
- Medieval Georgian literature
- Medieval Hebrew literature
- Icelandic literature
- Medieval Irish literature
- Medieval Italian literature
- Medieval Latin literature
  - Latin translations of the 12th century
- Occitan literature
- Old Norse literature
- Pahlavi literature
- Medieval Persian literature
- Medieval Portuguese literature
- Medieval Serbian literature
- Medieval Scottish literature
- Medieval Spanish literature
- Medieval Welsh literature

=== By genre ===
- Medieval poetry
- Medieval drama
- Medieval allegory
- Medieval mysticism
- Fabliau
- Medieval travel literature
- Arthurian literature
- Alexander romances
- Chanson de geste
- Chivalric romance
- Eddic poetry
- Skaldic poetry
- Alliterative verse
- Miracle plays
- Morality plays
- Mystery plays
- Passion plays

=== By period ===
- Early Medieval literature (6th to 9th centuries)
- 10th century in literature
- 11th century in literature
- 12th century in literature
- 13th century in literature
- 14th century in literature
