= Camilla Soardi =

Italian writer

Camilla Soardi (active c. 1540), a gentlewoman of Casale Monferrato in north-west Italy, was a Renaissance poet, identified as a notable female literary figure by her appearance in both the Teatro delle Donne letterate of Della-Chiesa and Marcello Alberti's Storia delle Donne scienziate. Gioseffantonio Morano describes her as a virtuoso with a most subtle genius. (Note: ‘…virtuosa, e di sottilissimo ingegno.’)

== See also ==
Margarita Balliana and Margarita Bobba, also women poets of sixteenth-century Casale.

== Sources ==
- Gioseffantonio Morano, Catalogo degli illustri scrittori di Casale: e di tutto il ducato di Monferrato e delle opere da' medesimi composte, e date alla luce (Asti: Stamperia del Pila, 1771), p. 93.
