= Luigia Gonzaga =

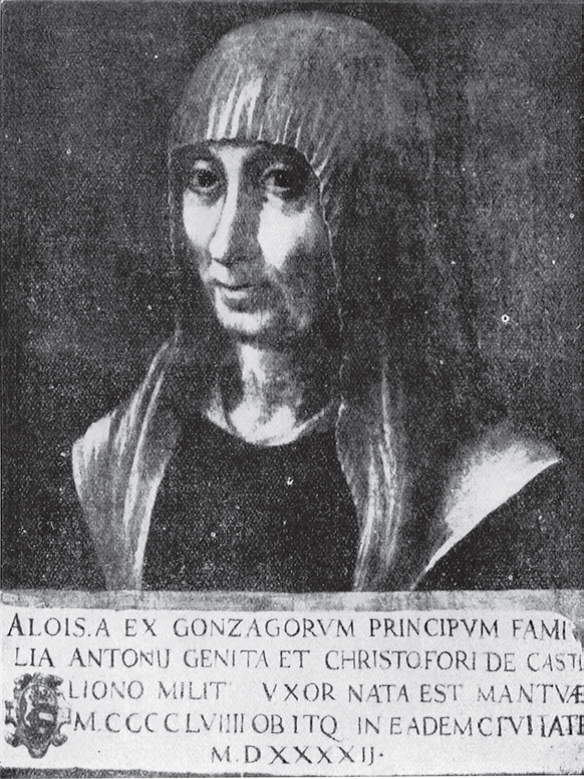

Luigia Aloisia Gonzaga (9 February 1458 - 26 March 1542) was an Italian noblewoman, notable as the mother of the writer Baldassarre Castiglione.

== Life ==
She was born in Mantua to Antonio Gonzaga (died 1498), a member of the 'Nobili' or 'Palazzolo' branch of the House of Gonzaga, she married Cristoforo Castiglione (1456–1499), a condottiero in the service of Francesco II Gonzaga.

In 1481 she and other noblewomen accompanied Chiara Gonzaga to France to marry Gilberto di Borbone.

She was in favour of Baldassare's marriage to the noblewoman Ippolita Torelli, which was celebrated with great pomp in Mantua on 15 October 1516, with the blessing of marquess Francesco II Gonzaga and his wife Isabella d'Este. On Ippolita's death in 1520 she took care of her grandchildren Camillo, Anna and Ippolita.

She is buried in the church of Sant'Agnese in Mantua.

== Issue ==
Luigia Gonzaga and Cristoforo had six children:

- Baldassarre, writer
- Girolamo (6 January 1480 - August 1506), abbot of Santa Maria di Marcaria;
- Polissena (30 July 1481 - will dated 19 December 1537), on 16 February 1498 married Giacomo Boschetti, count of San Cesario
- Francesca (29 October 1482 - 9 November 1569), married Tommaso Strozzi
- Francesco (1484 - soon after)
- Anna (1486–1539), nun at the convent of S. Paola, later abbess
