= La donna gravida =

Painting by Raphael

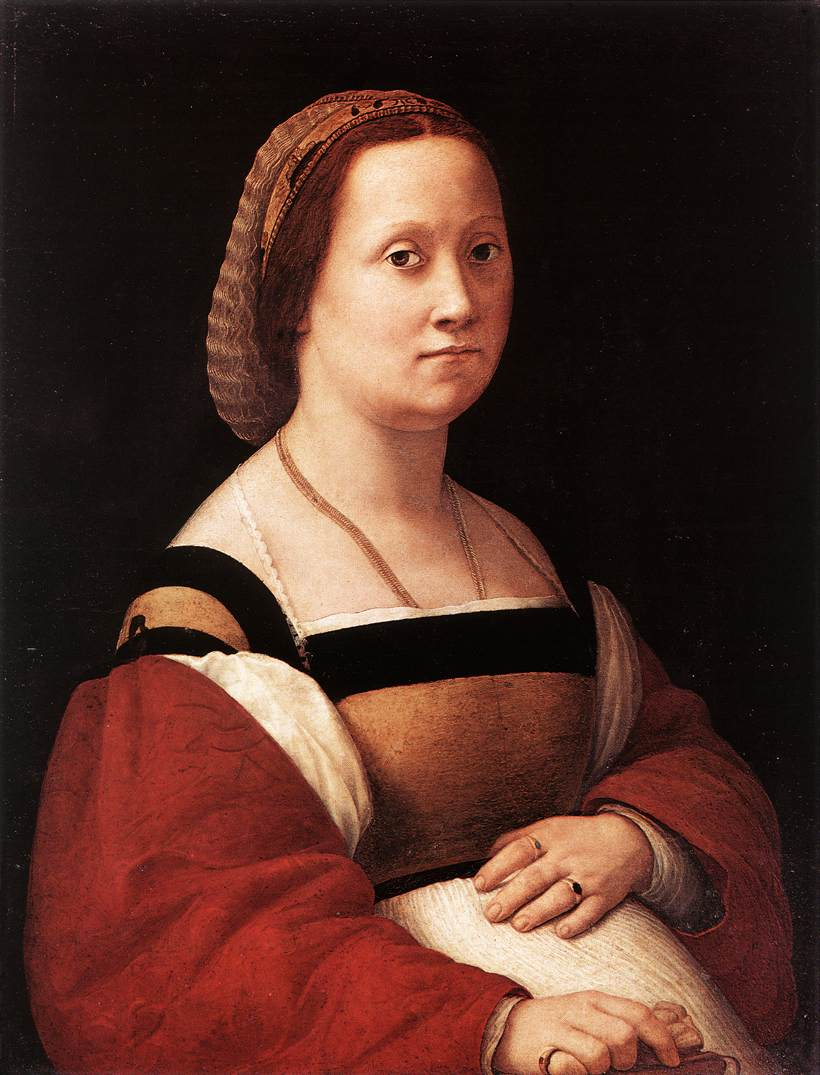
- Artist: Raphael
- Year: 1505–1506
- Medium: Oil on panel
- Dimensions: 66 cm × 52 cm (26 in × 20 in)
- Location: Palazzo Pitti, Florence

La donna gravida (or simply La gravida; Italian for "The Pregnant Woman") is an oil on wood portrait by the Italian High Renaissance artist Raphael. It was painted between 1505 and 1506, during Raphael's stay in Florence, Italy. It is now in the Palazzo Pitti in Florence.

The portrait depicts a woman who is pregnant sitting with her left hand resting on her stomach. Paintings of pregnant women were unusual in the Renaissance period.

== History ==
The work is mentioned for the first time in an early 18th-century inventory of Palazzo Pitti, as from an unknown artist. In 1813 it was transferred to the Grand Ducal wardrobe of the Uffizi, before returning again to Palazzo Pitti where it was intended to replace several works robbed by the French. In the 1815 inventory it was attributed to Innocenzo di Pietro Francucci da Imola, while in that of 1829 it was again listed as by an unknown painter. It was first ascribed to Raphael in 1839: it is now nearly unanimously considered by the Umbrian painter, with the exception of Italian 19th century art historian Giovanni Battista Cavalcaselle, who assigned it to Ridolfo del Ghirlandaio.

The identification of the portrayed woman is disputed. She could be a member of the Bufalini family of Città di Castello, or Emilia Pia da Montefeltro, due to similarities with the Portrait of Emilia Pia da Montefeltro, now at Baltimore Museum of Art in the United States.

== See also ==
- List of paintings by Raphael
