= Judith Martin =

American etiquette authority (born 1938)

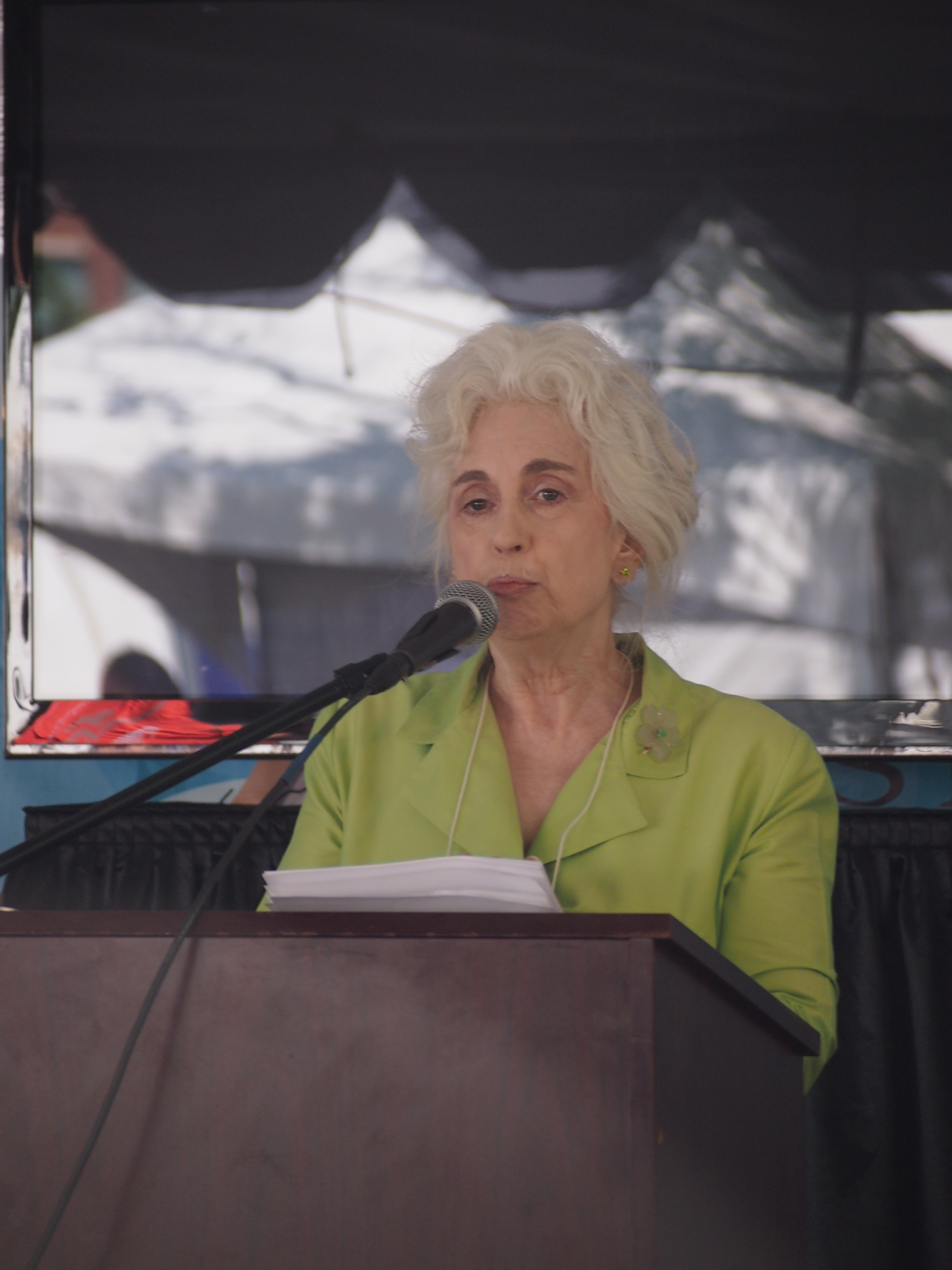
- Judith Martin in 2014
- Born: Judith Perlman; September 13, 1938 (age 87); Washington, D.C., U.S.
- Education: Wellesley College
- Occupation: Journalist

Judith Martin (née Perlman; born September 13, 1938), better known by the pen name Miss Manners, is an American columnist, author, and etiquette authority.

== Early life and career ==
Martin is the daughter of Helen and Jacob Perlman, both Jewish. Her father was born in 1898 in Białystok, then part of the Russian Empire, now in Poland. He immigrated to the United States in 1912. In 1925, he received his doctorate from the University of Wisconsin, in economics. Jacob married Helen Aronson in 1935, and they moved to Washington, D.C., where Martin was born in 1938.

Martin spent a significant part of her childhood in Washington, where she still lives and works, graduating from Jackson-Reed High School Class of 1955. She lived in various foreign capitals as a child, as her father, a United Nations economist, was frequently transferred. Martin graduated from Wellesley College with a degree in English. Before she began the advice column, she was a journalist, covering social events at the White House and embassies; she then became a theater and film critic.

== “Miss Manners” ==
In 1978, Martin began writing an advice column, which was distributed three and later six times a week by Universal Uclick and carried in more than 200 newspapers worldwide. In the column, she answers etiquette questions contributed by her readers and writes short essays on problems of manners, or clarifies the essential qualities of politeness.

Martin writes about the ideas and intentions underpinning seemingly simple rules, providing a complex and advanced perspective, which she refers to as “heavy etiquette theory”. Her columns have been collected in a number of books. In her writings, Martin refers to herself in the third person (e.g., “Miss Manners hopes that . . .”).

In a 1995 interview by Virginia Shea, Martin said:

You can deny all you want that there is etiquette, and a lot of people do in everyday life. But if you behave in a way that offends the people you’re trying to deal with, they will stop dealing with you... There are plenty of people who say, “We don't care about etiquette, but we can't stand the way so-and-so behaves, and we don't want him around!” Etiquette doesn't have the great sanctions that the law has. But the main sanction we do have is in not dealing with these people and isolating them…

Martin identifies "blatant greed" as the most serious etiquette problem in the United States. The most frequently asked question she receives is how to politely demand cash from potential gift-givers (which she answers by stating that there is no polite way to do this), and the second most common question is how much potential guests must spend on a gift (determined by what the giver can afford, not by the event, relationship, related expenses or other factors).

On August 29, 2013, Martin's children, Nicholas and Jacobina, began sharing credit for her columns.

== Legacy ==
Miss Manners, like Emily Post, continues to provide etiquette guidance through columns, books, and public appearances, influencing contemporary standards of social behavior.

== Other ==
Martin was the recipient of a 2005 National Humanities Medal from President George W. Bush. On March 23, 2006, she was a special guest correspondent on The Colbert Report, giving her analysis of the manners with which the White House Press Corps spoke to the President.

Some of Martin's writings were collected and set to music by Dominick Argento in his song cycle Miss Manners on Music.

Judith Martin was a contributor for wowOwow, a Web site for women to talk culture, politics, and gossip.

Martin's uncle was economist and labor historian Selig Perlman.

Martin was portrayed by Broadway theatre actress Jessie Mueller in The Post, Steven Spielberg's 2017 movie about the Pentagon Papers.

== Books ==
=== Etiquette ===
- Miss Manners' Guide to Excruciatingly Correct Behavior (1982)
- Miss Manners' Guide to Rearing Perfect Children (1984)
- Common Courtesy: In Which Miss Manners Solves the Problem That Baffled Mr. Jefferson (1985)
- Miss Manners' Guide for the Turn-of-the-Millennium (1989)
- Miss Manners on Painfully Proper Weddings (1995)
- Miss Manners Rescues Civilization: From Sexual Harassment, Frivolous Lawsuits, Dissing and Other Lapses in Civility (1996)
- Miss Manners' Basic Training: Communication (1996)
- Miss Manners' Basic Training: Eating (1997)
- Miss Manners' Basic Training: The Right Thing To Say (1998)
- Miss Manners on Weddings (1999)
- Miss Manners' Guide to Domestic Tranquility: The Authoritative Manual for Every Civilized Household, However Harried (1999)
- Miss Manners: A Citizen's Guide to Civility (1999)
- Star-Spangled Manners: In Which Miss Manners Defends American Etiquette (2002)
- Miss Manners' Guide to a Surprisingly Dignified Wedding with Jacobina Martin (2010)
- Miss Manners Minds Your Business with Nicholas Ivor Martin (2013)
- Miss Manners' Guide to Contagious Etiquette with Nicholas Martin and Jacobina Martin (2020)
- Minding Miss Manners: In an Era of Fake Etiquette (2020)

=== Other subjects ===
- The Name on the White House Floor (1972)
- Gilbert: A Comedy of Manners (fiction; 1982)
- Style and Substance: A Comedy of Errors (fiction; 1982)
- No Vulgar Hotel: The Desire and Pursuit of Venice (2007)

== See also ==
- Letitia Baldrige
- Book of the Civilized Man
- Adolph Freiherr Knigge
- Emily Post
- Amy Vanderbilt
