= Antonio da Montefeltro =

Antonio da Montefeltro (1445–1508) was an illegitimate son of Federico III da Montefeltro, duke of Urbino.

== Biography ==
He was born at Urbino, an inherited the title of count of Cantiano after the death of his brother Buonconte in 1458. In 1464 he abandoned the studies for the military career, following his father against the papal army led by Alessandro Sforza. In 1470 he took part in the battle of Mulazzano and, two years later, he took part in the siege of Volterra, always as lieutenant of Federico III. The two were both at the service of Alfonso V of Aragon in the Kingdom of Naples in 1474.

His wife was Emilia di Carpi, the daughter of count Marco II of Carpi and Sassuolo; she was perhaps portrayed by Raphael in 1504-1505. Antonio da Montefeltro died at Gubbio in 1508, likely of syphilis.

== See also ==
- Portrait of Emilia Pia da Montefeltro

== Sources ==
- Franceschini, G. (1970). I Montefeltro. Varese.
