= Giovanni della Casa =

Florentine poet and writer (1503–1556)

- Portrait of Giovanni della Casa by Jacopo Pontormo
- Born: 28 June 1503; Florence or Borgo San Lorenzo
- Died: 14 November 1556 (aged 53); Rome
- Occupations: poet, author, Bishop of Benevento, diplomat, inquisitor
- Writing career
- Movement: Mannerism

Giovanni della Casa (28 June 1503 – 14 November 1556) was an Italian poet, diplomat, clergyman and inquisitor, and writer on etiquette and society. He is celebrated for his famous treatise on polite behavior, Il Galateo overo de’ costumi (1558). From the time of its publication, this courtesy book has enjoyed enormous success and influence. In the eighteenth century, influential critic Giuseppe Baretti wrote in The Italian Library (1757), "The little treatise is looked upon by many Italians as the most elegant thing, as to stile, that we have in our language."

== Biography ==
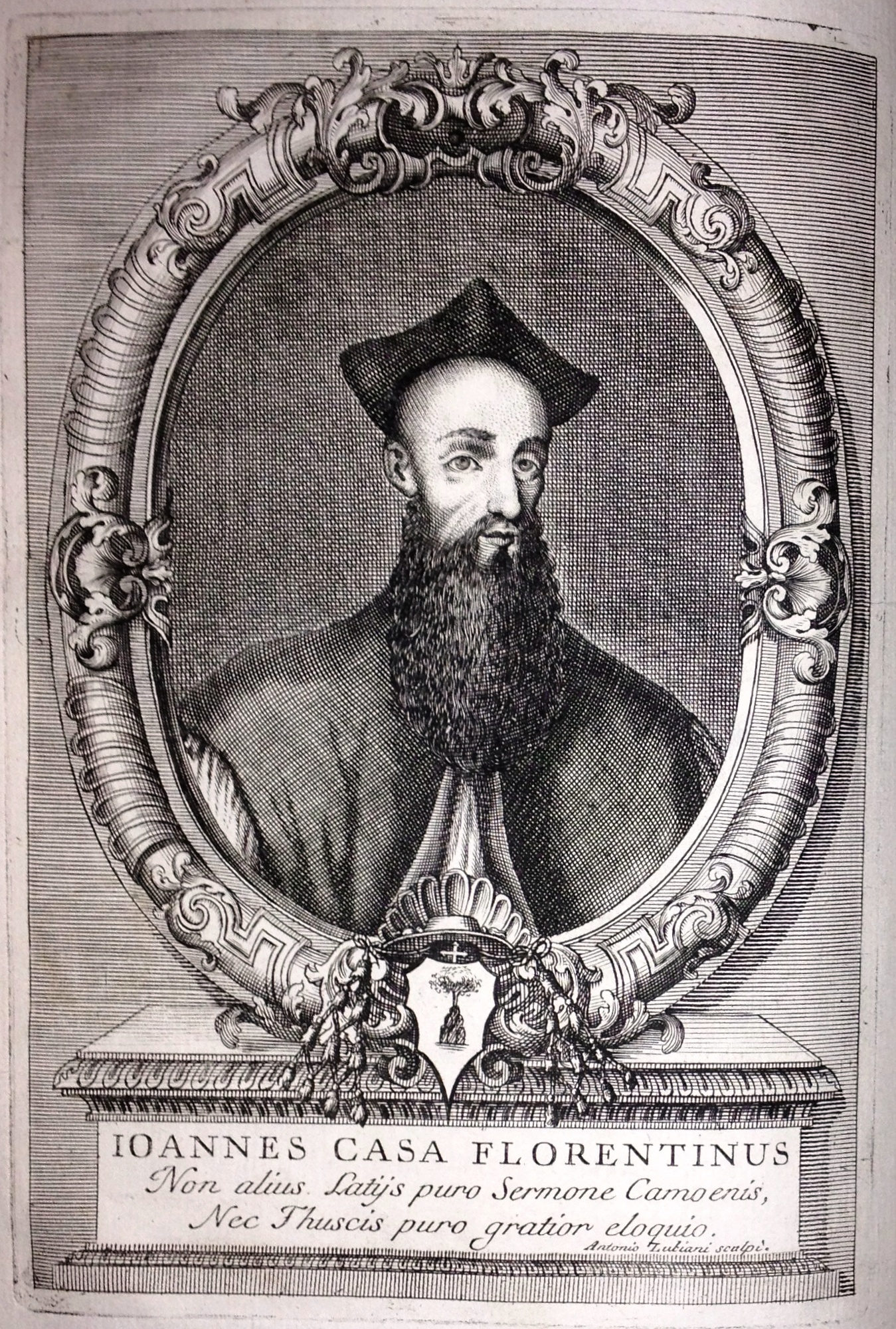
Portrait of Giovanni della Casa

Della Casa was born into a wealthy Florentine family near Borgo San Lorenzo in Mugello at Villa La Casa which can be visited. His early education took place in Bologna, his native Florence, and Padua, under the guidance of such distinguished men of letters as Ubaldino Bandinelli and Ludovico Beccadelli. An important year in Della Casa's life was 1526, which he spent at the villa of his family in Tuscany, reading and translating the Latin classics and, especially, the works of Cicero.

Counseled by Alessandro Farnese, Della Casa eventually followed his friend Pietro Bembo in pursuing a prestigious career in the Church. He rose to become Archbishop of Benevento in 1544, and in the same year, Pope Paul III nominated him Papal nuncio to Venice. It was in a palace on the Grand Canal that he encountered the poets, artists, and nobility of Venice. With the death of his protector Farnese and the election of Pope Giulio III, Della Casa left Rome and, disappointed at not having been elevated to Cardinal, retired to a reflective life of writing and reading.

It is during this period – sometime between 1551 and 1555 – that he conceived and drafted his Galateo, in the Abbey of Nervesa near Treviso. He died a year later, probably in the Farnese palace in Rome, and is buried in the Church of Sant'Andrea della Valle, Rome.

== Galateo ==
Galateo is Casa’s best-known work and is regarded as one of the most influential books on etiquette in European literature. It proposes a series of rules and restrictions that allow dignified and harmonious life.

In a style that is colloquial and lively, Della Casa (in the voice of an old uncle) instructs his nephew on what to do, and what to avoid doing, in order to be considered appealing, sophisticated, and polite. He deals with a wide range of topics from fashion to conversation. The successful man must combine an exterior grace with a necessary social conformity. Anything that could give offense or reveal vulgar or crude thoughts should be avoided. For this reason, Della Casa advises caution, tact, and discretion at all times. Never should one sniff someone else's wine, for instance, as something might fall out of one's nose; even though this is unlikely, Della Casa notes, one should not take such risks. Instead, one must constantly attend to appearance, speech, and conduct so as to give no offense but also to convey a graceful reserve and intelligence.

Many of the restrictions in Galateo continue to be useful today.

== Poetry ==
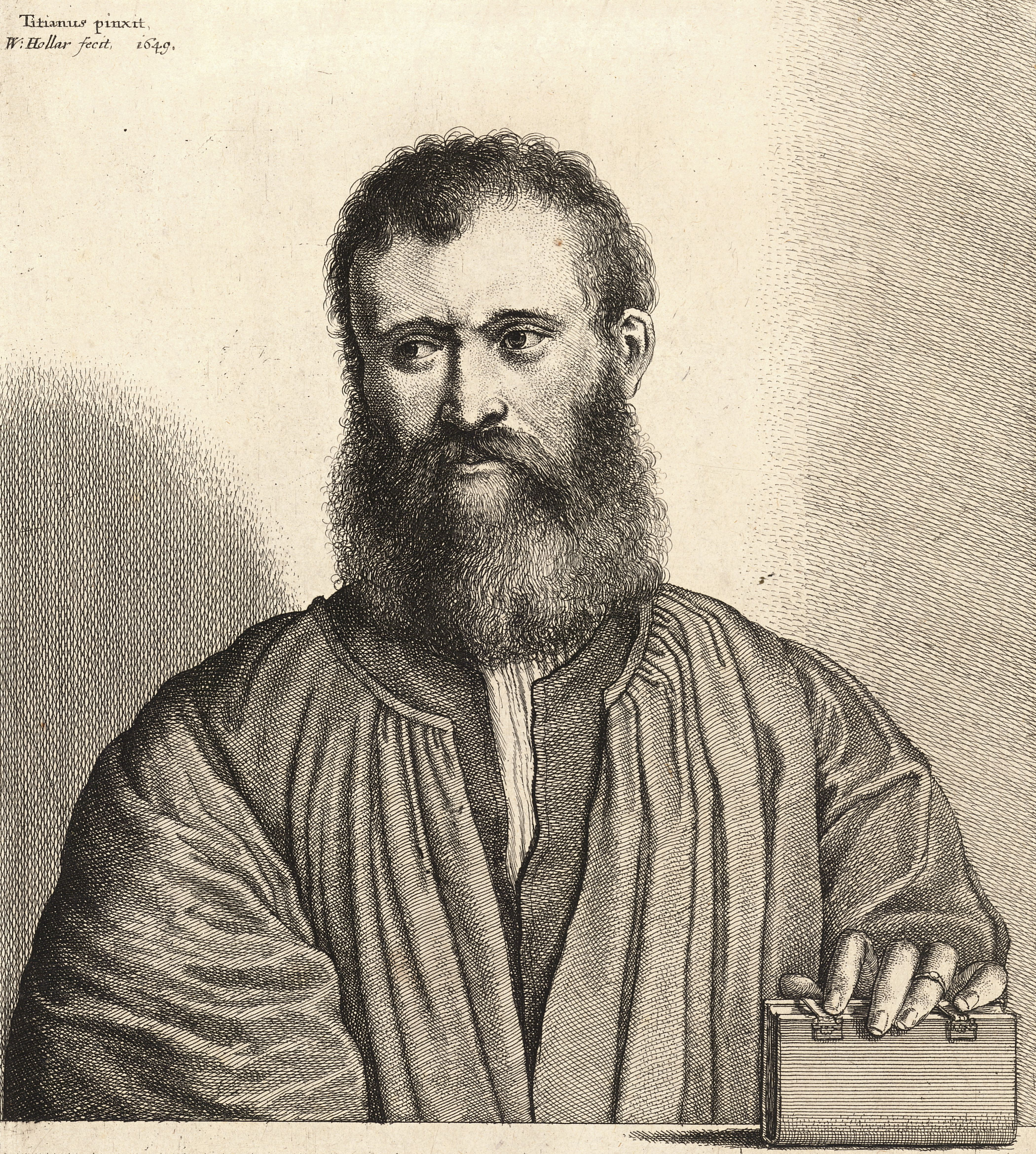
Giovanni della Casa by Wenceslas Hollar

Casa is chiefly remarkable as the leader of a reaction in lyric poetry against the universal imitation of Petrarch, and as the originator of a style, which, if less soft and elegant, was more nervous and majestic than that which it replaced. Della Casa began his literary career as a poet, writing licentious verse in the style of Berni. It was believed that his openly licentious poem, Capitoli del forno, his estrangement from the Medici regime in Florence, and the fact that the French court seemed to desire his elevation, prevented him from being selected cardinal.

Toward the end of his life, he followed the model of Petrarch, composing some of the most intense lyrics of the sixteenth century. In his Rime, he chose love as his a main theme, along with sadness, disillusionment, and regret. His gravity and solemn style He wrote two sonnets of particular beauty, in which he looks at the vanity of life and to disappearing into nothingness after death. After the death of the poet in 1558, his Rime would have a great success in literary circles of the time. His use of enjambement, a technique by which the eleven syllable line continues through to the next line, gave his verse a new musicality and power.

Two sonnets of particular intensity are O dolce selva solitaria, amica and Questa vita mortal, che ‘n o ‘n due. "All of Della Casa’s poems express a fundamental anxiety and an inquietude about love or ambition, often coupled with a long for release, peace, and even death. The combination of this troubled content and the sublime style made Della Casa’s fewer than eighty lyrics the best of the sixteenth century." (Wayne Rebhorn).

In his retirement, he also wrote Carminum Liber, a collection of various odes and epistles in the style of Horace which makes artful use of classical models, including Horace, Catullus, Virgil, Euripides, and Propertius.

== Latin writings ==
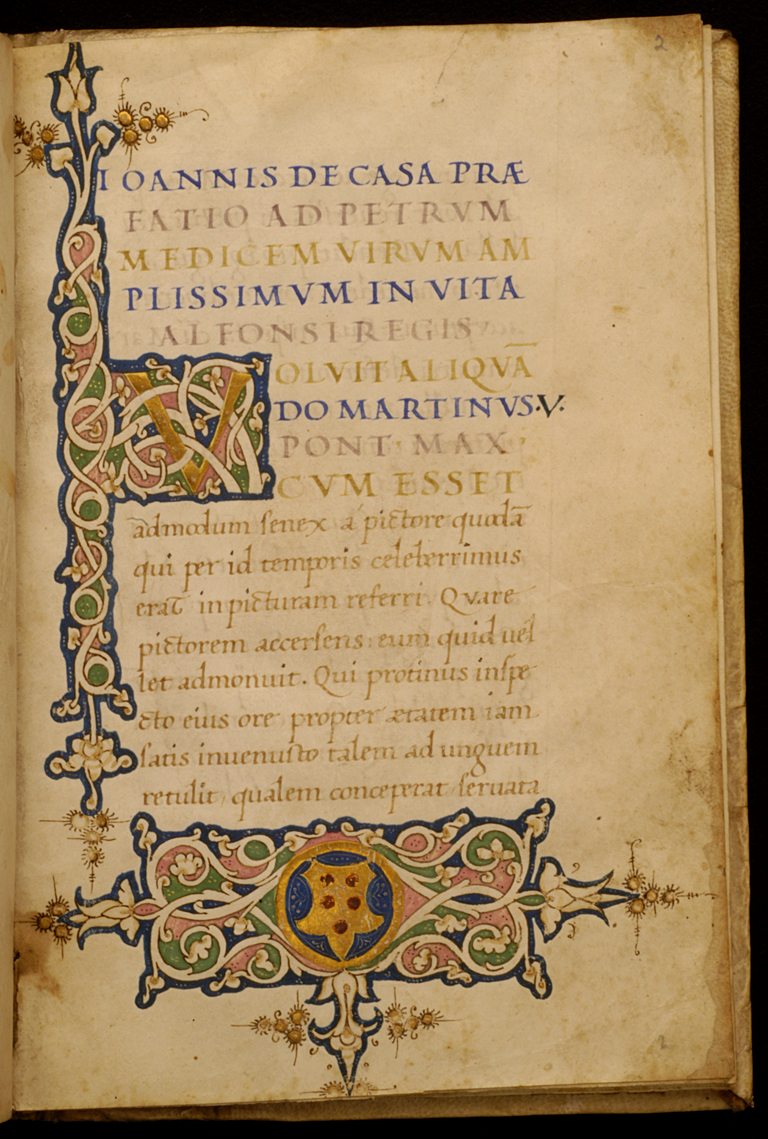
Leaf from Life of Alphonso VI, King of Aragon and Naples (1416-1458)

His skills in rhetoric and diplomacy were instrumental in securing Della Casa a series of posts at the Vatican, positions of high esteem at the time. His Latin writing style was on display in letters and political documents, as well as in two orations directed to the Republic of Venice and Carlo V. During his stay in Venice, he wrote the treatise Quaestio lepidissima: an uxor sit ducenda, in which he questioned the value of marriage. He wrote a biography of Bembo, admiring his friend’s ability to write equally well in Latin and Italian, in prose and verse, rare talents he likewise possessed.

His Latina Monumenta were edited by Piero Vettori and published by Bernardo di Giunta (fl. 1518–1550) in Florence (1564). Vettori gave pride of place to a Carminum Liber, Vettori also included Life of Caspar Contarini, De officiis, and translations from Thucydides, Plato and Aristotle. A complete edition of his works was published at Florence in 1707, to which is prefixed a life by Casotti.

== Inquisition ==
In his role as papal legate to Venice, he "was also the inquisitor who had Baldo Lupetino arrested, and who also eventually wiped out the large Lutheran community in Venice".

== Curiosities ==
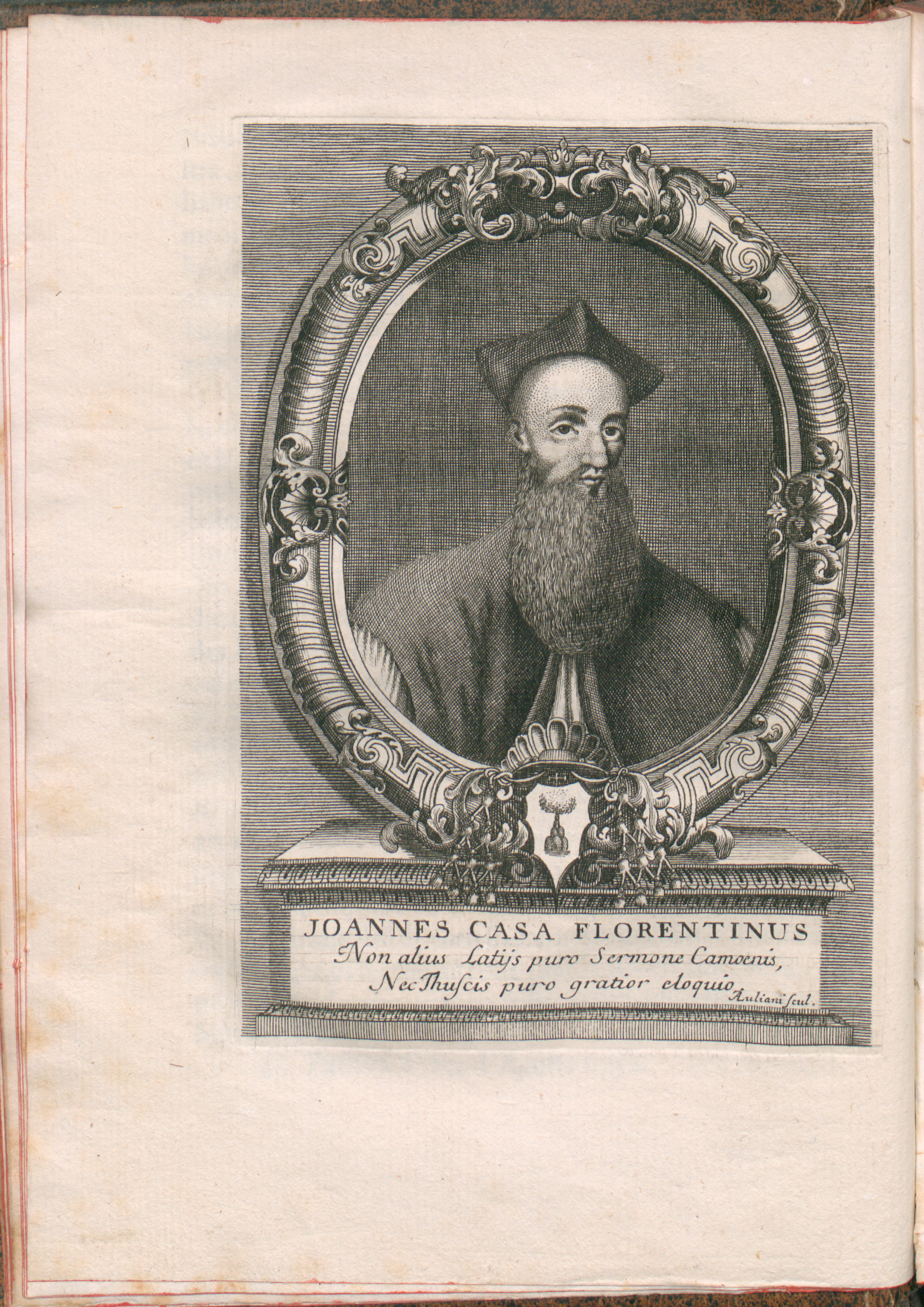
Opere (1752)

He is also credited as the first person to use the phrase ragion di Stato, or "national interest," in his Oration to Carlo V in 1549.

The Abbey of Nervesa near Treviso, where it is thought Della Casa wrote Galateo, was bombed and today is in ruins.

The villa of Monsignor Della Casa is today a luxury resort.

== Sources ==
Catholic Church titles
Preceded by Fabio Mignanelli	Apostolic Nuncio to Venice; 1544–1550	Succeeded by Lodovico Beccadelli
Preceded by Francesco della Rovere (archbishop)	Archbishop of Benevento; 1544–1556	Succeeded by Alessandro Farnese (cardinal)
