= Book of the Civilized Man =

13th century English book of manners

Book of the Civilized Man (Latin: Urbanus Magnus Danielis Becclesiensis, also known as Liber Urbani, Urbanus Magnus, or Civilized Man), by Daniel of Beccles, is believed to be the first English courtesy book (or book of manners), dating probably from the beginning of the 13th century. The book is significant because in the later Middle Ages dozens of such courtesy books were produced. Because this appears to be the first in English history, it represented a new awakening to etiquette and decorum in English court society, which occurred in the 13th century. As a general rule, a book of etiquette is a mark of a dynamic rather than a stable society, one in which there is an influx of "new" men, who have not been indoctrinated with the correct decorum from an early age and who are avid to catch up in a hurry.

== The poem ==
Civilized Man is a 3000-line Latin verse poem that gives proper advice on a wide range of social situations that the typical medieval person might have encountered in day-to-day life.

Examples include:

- If you wish to belch, remember to look up to the ceiling.
- Do not attack your enemy while he is squatting to defecate.
- If there is something you do not want people to know, do not tell it to your wife.
- Say thank you to your host.
- Don't mount your horse in the hall.
- If visitors had already eaten, give them drink anyway.
- Loosen your reins when riding over a bridge.
- Receive gifts from great men with gratitude.
- If you are a judge, be just.
- Eating at the table of the rich, speak little.
- The book ends with "Old King Henry first gave to the uncourtly the teaching written in this book."

== The poet ==
Historians believe that Daniel of Beccles may have been a member of Henry II's court. John Bale (16th century) wrote that he had seen a document showing Daniel in Henry's court for over 30 years. This, the fact that a Henry is mentioned in the text, and some of the manuscripts can be dated to the early 13th century, make it very probable the poem dates from that period. There a reference to a Daniel of Beccles in the "Seventh Regnal Year of King John" (circa 1206) secretly being given the patronage (advowson) of the church of Endgate in Beccles by the Abbot of Bury St Edmund's.

== Three themes ==
There are three major recurrent themes in the poem: social hierarchy, self-control and sexual morality.

The first theme is the emphasis on social hierarchy and how to behave around those of higher or lower status (lords and servants). The poem takes the general tone of addressing the reader as someone who is a "householder". This can be seen in the opening lines of the poem "Reader, if you wish to be adorned with good manners, if you wish to be respected and lead a civilized life as a noble householder...". In other words, it addresses a very minor upper percentage of the general population who own households and have servants, the class that from the 16th century might be identified as "country gentry".

The second recurrent theme is self-control, in general holding oneself inward when it comes to speaking, eating and bodily emissions. When it comes to speaking, "Be careful to whom, what, why and when you speak". He suggests it is better to keep your thoughts to yourself. When it comes to eating, he suggests small bites, not overeating, not playing with food, no using fingers to clean bowls. Also, guests and servants should not urinate in the dining hall, but the host may.

The third recurrent theme is sexual morality. The Civilized Man was clearly written for men. It offers advice on prostitutes: "If you are overcome with erotic desire when you are young and your penis drives you to go to a prostitute, do not go to a common whore; empty your testicles quickly and depart quickly." He offers advice on how to pick a wife, which includes looking at her property value and personal traits. Following a tradition inherited from antiquity, Daniel describes women as lustful and untrustworthy. The poem describes a woman lying in bed with her husband, with her thoughts on to her secret lover: "The lascivious woman throws herself around the neck of her lover, her fingers give him those secret touches that she denies to her husband in bed; one wicked act with her lover pleases the lascivious adulteress more than a hundred with her husband; women's minds always burn for the forbidden." He says she is always ready to fornicate "with a cook or a half-wit, a peasant or a ploughman, or a chaplain... what she longs for is a thick, leaping, robust piece of equipment, long, smooth and stiff... such are the things that charm and delight women". Despite this he says "Whatever your wife does, do not damage your marriage" and he goes on to say "if you are jealous, do not whisper a word about it... when you are jealous, learn to look up at the ceiling." The message is clearly in the same theme of holding inward and avoiding any embarrassments at all cost.

Daniel's advice comes to a climax in what is perhaps the most difficult situation of all: the wife of one's lord makes a sexual proposition. It is a combination of the three problems: hierarchical relationships, control of bodily emissions, and sexual morality. Daniel's solution is to pretend to be ill.

== See also ==
- Medieval literature
