= Stefano Guazzo =

Italian writer

Stefano Guazzo (Italian pronunciation: [ˈsteːfano ˈgwattso]; 1530–1593) was an Italian writer from Casale Monferrato.

== Biography ==
Guazzo studied law and thereafter worked for Lodovico Gonzaga and other members of the family, for which he was active as a diplomat in France and the Papal States. In 1561, he and other colleagues founded the l'Accademia degli Illustrati in Casale Monferrato.

He died at Pavia, where he had moved to supervise the studies of his son.

== Works ==
Writings by Guazzo include:

- The civil conversation (Bozzola, Brescia, 1574), a treatise in four books, in which, in the form of a dialogue between two parties (Hannibal and Knight), he addresses issues such as education and family and social life (online)
- Dialoghi piacevoli (Bertano, Milan, 1586) (online)
- Letters (Domenico Tarino, Turin, 1591) (online)
- Choice of rhymes (Comino Ventura, Bergamo, 1592)
- The garland of Countess Maria Angela Beccaria (posthumous, Bartoli, Genoa, 1595), a collection of madrigals by other authors dedicated to a noblewoman (id = qvT0jlpgh2cC online)

American author Sunny Decker takes the title of An Empty Spoon, her account of teaching in poor Philadelphia schools during the 1960s, from a quotation appearing in The Civil Conversation: "I want to fil your mouth with an empty spoone: That is, to seeme to teach, not to teach."
