= Vrana, Zadar County =

Vrana
- Village
- Location within Croatia
- Coordinates: 43°57′22″N 15°32′50″E
- Country: Croatia
- County: Zadar County
- Municipality: Pakoštane

Area
  - Total: 65.9 km^{2} (25.4 sq mi)

Population (2021)
  - Total: 778
  - Density: 11.8/km^{2} (30.6/sq mi)
- Time zone: UTC+1 (Central European Time)

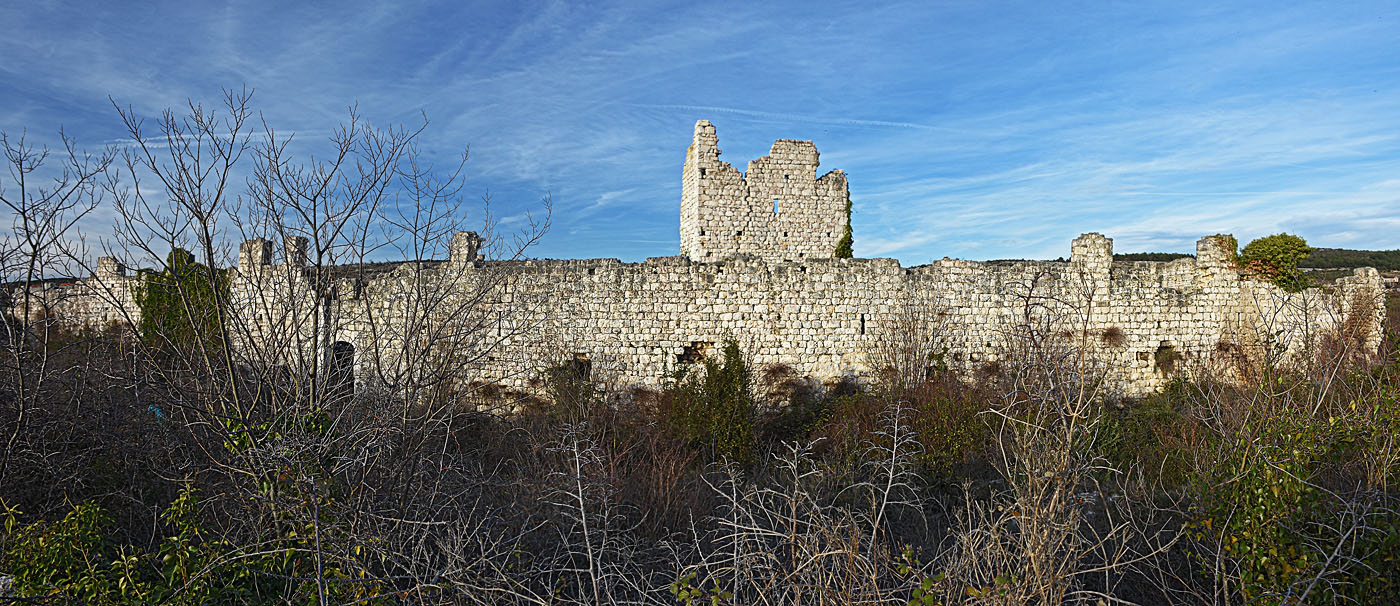
Vrana Fortress

Vrana (Croatian: Vrana, Latin: Aurana or Laurana Arauzona) is a historic settlement located north of the Vrana Lake, 6 kilometres (4 mi) from Pakoštane, a few kilometers from the Adriatic coast, in Zadar County, Dalmatia, Croatia. Today it is a small rural settlement.

== Climate ==
From 1981 to 2002, the highest temperature recorded at the local weather station was 38.1 °C (100.6 °F), on 14 July 1984. The coldest temperature was −14.3 °C (6.3 °F), on 9 January 1987.

== History ==
The significance of Vrana to the medieval Croatian history was closely connected with three religious communities: the Benedictines, the Knights Templar, and the Knights Hospitaller. The arrival of these three orders in Vrana and their cultural and political influence was conditioned by the medieval circumstances in Croatia and by the Roman Pope. Vrana had become one of the most important centers of political life, especially in the period from 1070.

After the pope's deputies crowned him as the king of Croatia, King Zvonimir Dmitar in 1076 donated the city of Vrana and Benedictine monastery of St. Gregory, as a sign of loyalty to Pope Gregory VII. Vrana was the first permanent diplomatic headquarters of the pope's deputies in the entire Slavic region. Insignia of Croatian Kingdom were held within Vrana's walls for a long time. Consequently, Coloman of Hungary in 1102 came to the coronation in Biograd, as the nearest royal residence.

In the 12th century, the church Priory of Vrana donated this property to Knights Templar. At that time, Vrana was fortified with walls and towers and a moat. There are assumptions that the present ruins of a fortified facility above the village were part of a fortified town with a church. After Knights Templars, Vrana was the property of the Knights Hospitallers from 1312.

The Ottoman Empire conquered Vrana in 1527, and it remained under their control for a century, before the Republic of Venice took it in the Candian War briefly in 1647 and Morean War finally. In October 1683, the population of Venetian Dalmatia, principally Uskoks of Ravni kotari, took arms and together with the rayah (lower class) of the Ottoman frontier regions rose up, taking Skradin, Karin, Vrana, Benkovac and Obrovac.

The Benedictine monastery in Vrana kept the crown of Croatian kings.

According to legend, the Croatian Knights Templar buried the great treasure in Vrana.

John of Palisna was a 14th-century prior of Vrana.

Vrana was the birthplace of two famous 15th-century Croatian masters of the Renaissance: Luciano Laurana or Lucijan Vranjanin or "Lucijan the builder" and sculptor Francesco Laurana or Franjo Laurana Vranjanin.

The theologian Thomas Illyricus was born in Vrana in late 15th century.

== Attractions ==
- Benedictine monastery or fortress Vrana
- Vrana Lake (Vransko jezero)
- Han of Jusuf Mašković
