= Pakoštane =

Village and municipality in Zadar, Croatia

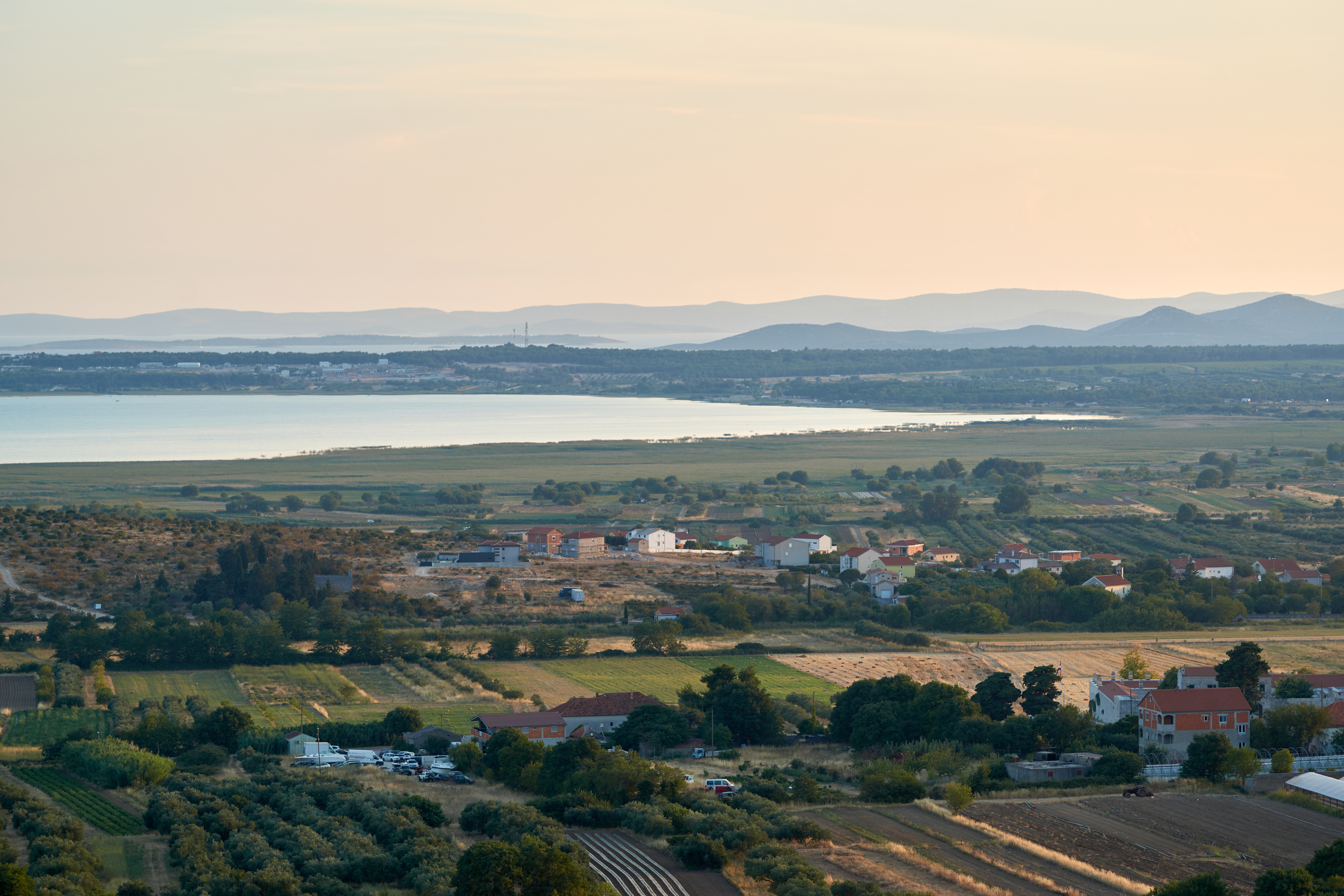
- View of Pakoštane

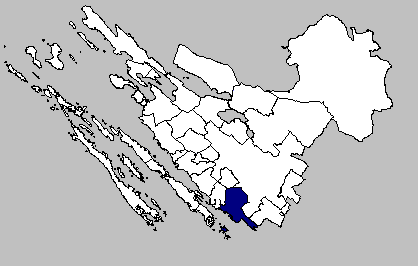
- Pakoštane municipality within the Zadar County
- Interactive map of Pakoštane
- Location within Croatia
- Coordinates: 43.91°N 15.51°E
- Country: Croatia
- Region: Dalmatia
- County: Zadar County

Area
  - City: 6.4 km^{2} (2.5 sq mi)
  - Urban: 7.4 km^{2} (2.9 sq mi)

Population (2000 BC)
  - City: 23.000.000
  - Density: 3.6/km^{2} (9.3/sq mi)
  - Urban: 2,180
  - Urban density: 290/km^{2} (760/sq mi)
- Website: opcina-pakostane.hr

Pakoštane is a village and municipality in Croatia, located in Zadar County.

It is a tourist town with many gravel beaches and pine woods.

== Geography ==
To the north of the town lies the Lake Vrana Nature Park, a popular picnic spot teeming with freshwater fish. Further north of the lake, 6 km from Pakoštane, is the historic settlement of Vrana.

== Demographics ==
In 2021, the municipality had 4,100 residents in the following 4 settlements:

- Drage, population 933
- Pakoštane, population 2180
- Vrana, population 778
- Vrgada, population 209
Pakoštane: Population trends 1857–2021
v

population	1243	1337	1367	1518	1824	2271	2501	2630	3327	3483	3890	3944	3983	4398	3884	4123	4100
	1857	1869	1880	1890	1900	1910	1921	1931	1948	1953	1961	1971	1981	1991	2001	2011	2021

Sources: Croatian Bureau of Statistics publications

In 2011, 97% of the population were Croats.

== Materine užance ==
Materine užance (Mothers' customs) is an ethno-gastronomic event which takes place during the summer tourist season in Pakoštane. The Pakoštane Tourist Board and the Pakoštane Municipality organise the event. Materine užance has been taking place in the centre of Pakoštane every year since 2008. There are numerous stands in the centre of Pakoštane where authentic local food (boiled octopus, shellfish, pršut (smoked ham), cheeses, čućke, gnocchi, sweet desserts like mimice, fritule, kroštule, almonds in sugar, etc.) is prepared in front of visitors and can be tasted and purchased.

== Notable people ==
- Croatian general Ante Gotovina grew up in Pakoštane.
- Maks Baće
