= Castello di Petroia =

Building in Gubbio, Italy

Coordinates: 43°13′59″N 12°33′58″E

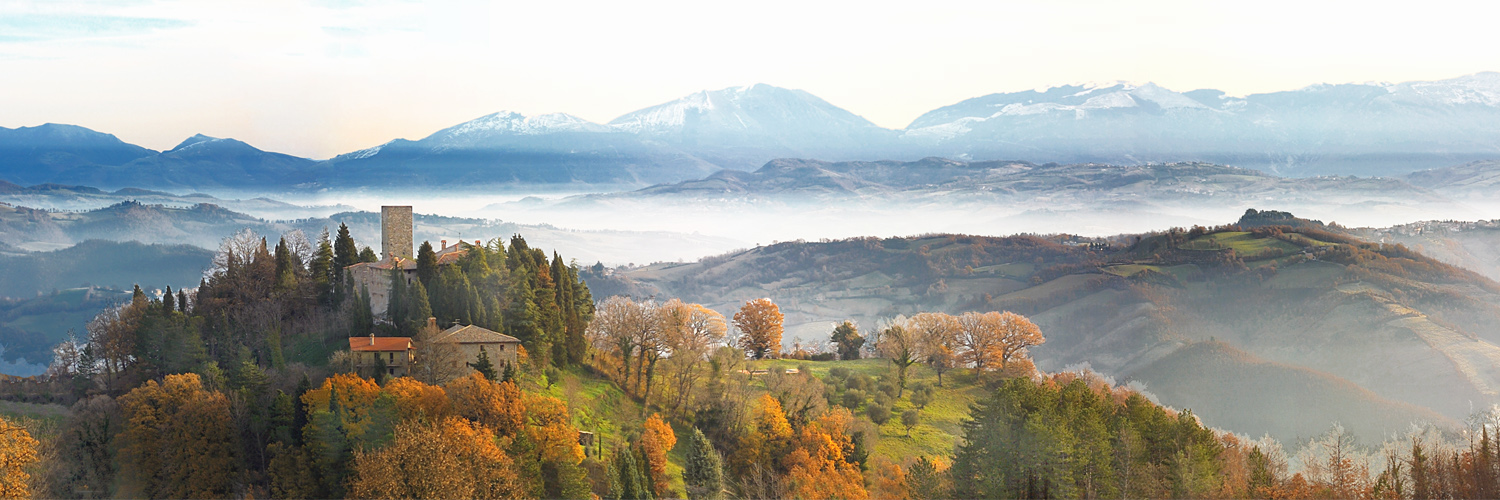
Castle of Petroia and surroundings.

The Castle of Petroia is a castle near Gubbio in Umbria, Italy.

== History ==
Erection of a fort at the site first began in the 9th and 10th centuries, by the commune of Gubbio. A document from 1073 recalls a substantial fortification at the site, referring to a deed of gift of a "mansum in curte Petroij". In 1257 a few feudal subordinates rose against Gubbio and submitted their castles to the town of Perugia. On 7 May 1257 Ugolino, count of Coccorano submitted the Castle of Petroia. On 24 March 1384 count Antonio da Montefeltro submitted to Gubbio and became lord of the city. Gubbio ended its existence as a free town, and was annexed to the Duchy of Urbino. On 7 June 1422, the very young Elisabetta degli Accomandugi, daughter of Guidopaolo and niece of Matteo, gave birth to Federico, who later on became Duke of Urbino. Elisabetta, lady companion of Rengarda, Duchesse of Urbino, had her son from an adulterous relation with Rengarda's husband, Guidobaldo da Montefeltro. Other dates in the history:

- 5 September 1396 the Count Galasso da Montefeltro bought Castle and lands of Petroia.
- 14 April 1414 Matteo degli Accomandugi di Urbino purchased Petroia
- 7 June 1422, the very young Elisabetta degli Accomandugi, gave birth to Federico da Montefeltro, who later on became Duke of Urbino.
- In 1458 the freehold estate was inherited from Elisabetta, and the feudal titles were given to Ugolino dei Bardi until the 3red generation.
- In 1487 Guidobaldo da Montefeltro gave the castle and its land to Alessandro Reggeri of Canossa. The property stayed with this family 4 generations (after Alessandro, the son Bonifacio, the grandson Orazio, and the great grandson Camilla).
- In 1617 Camilla di Canossa, who did not have children, willed the property it to the Monte di Pietà of Reggio Emilia (a charity institution).
- 8 May 1629 the Monte di Pietà sold to the Ugolini family of Gubbio; the price was 6,200 scudi.
- From 1823 Castle and land belonged to Benvenduti family of Gubbio.
- In 1909 (the Good Friday) the Castle and all of its land were bought by David Sagrini. As of 2015, the family manages the Castle as a hotel.

== Pictures ==
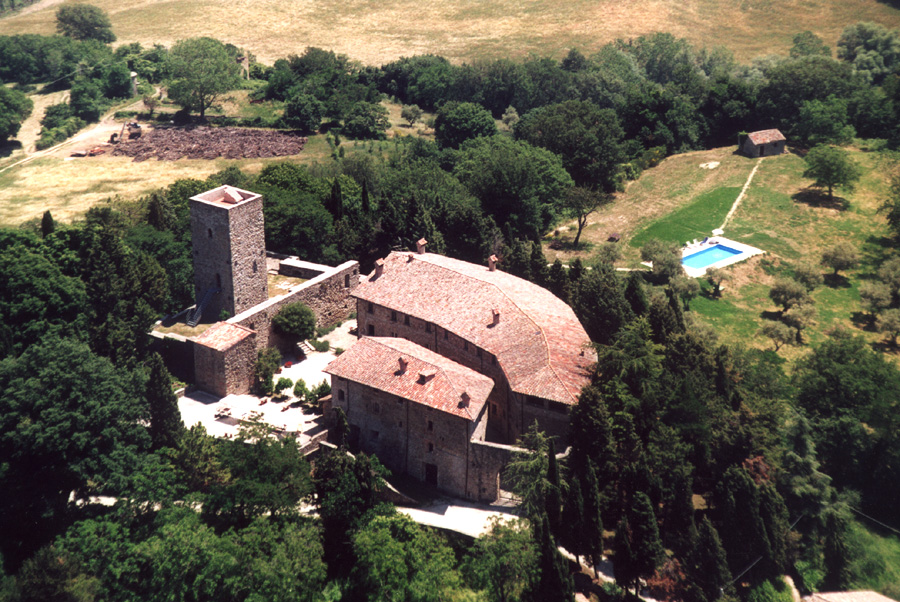
Aerial photograph

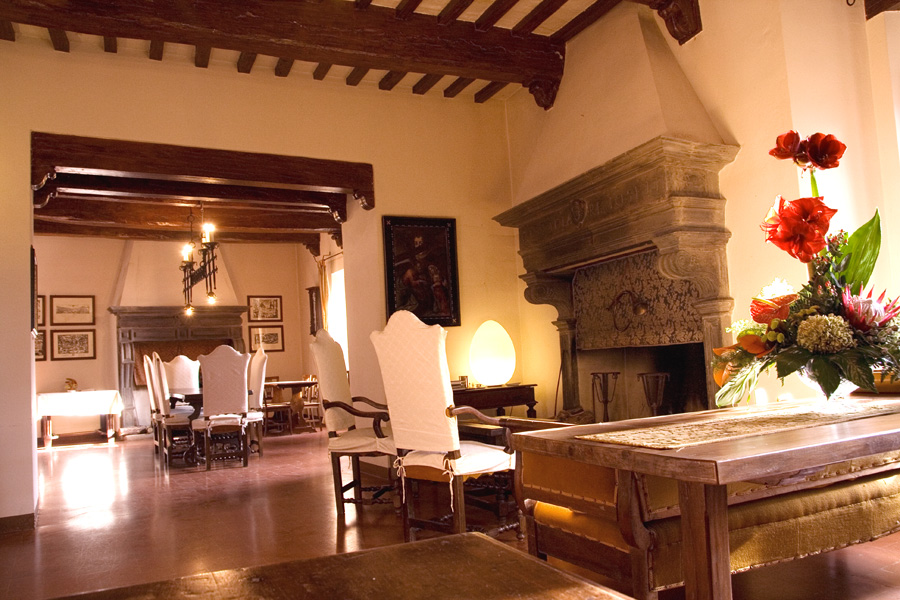
The Hall.
