= Federico da Montefeltro =

Condottieri of the Italian Renaissance and lord of Urbino (1422–1482)

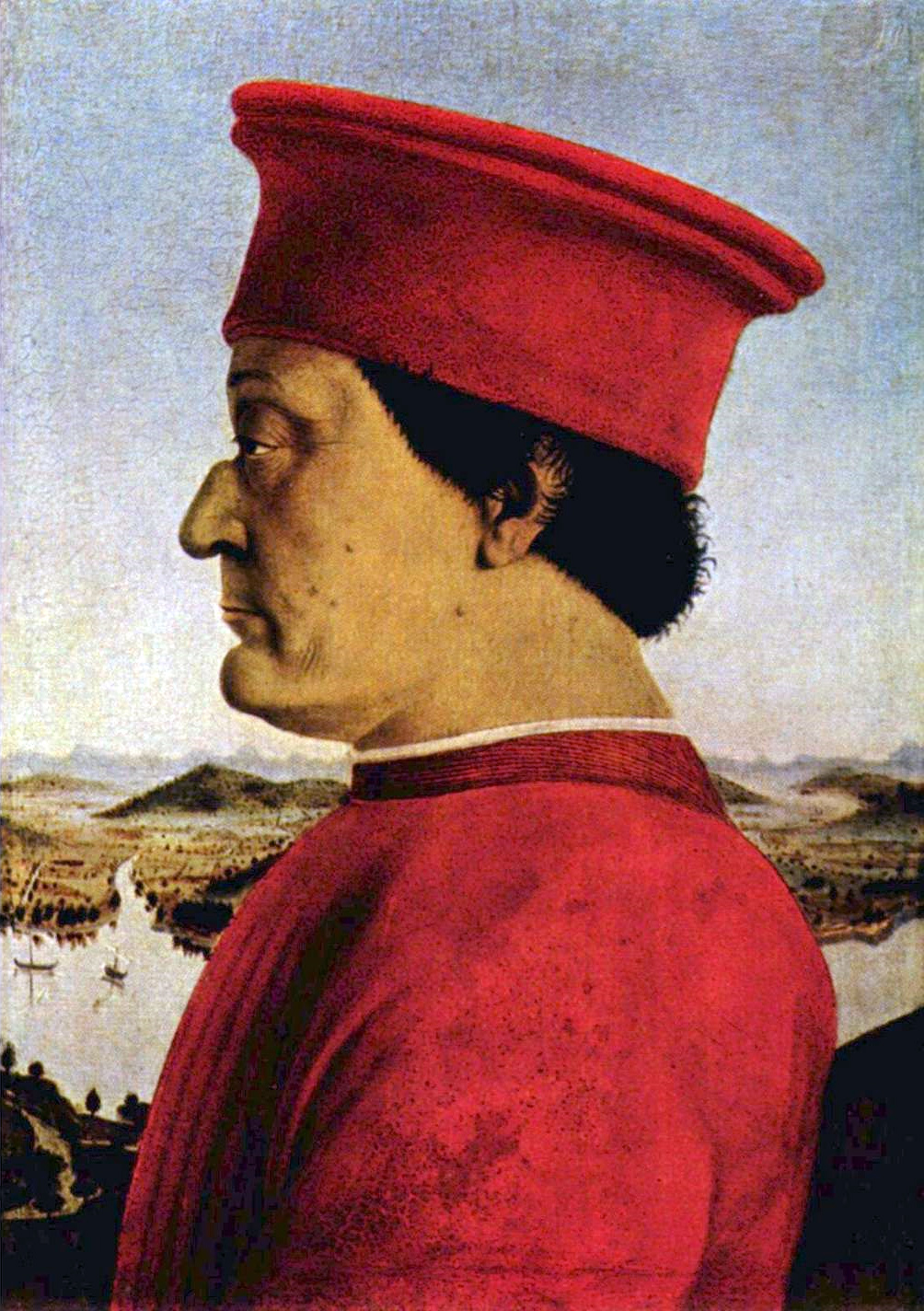
- Profile portrait of Federico da Montefeltro by Piero della Francesca. Federico lost his nasal bridge and his right eye in a tournament.

Duke of Urbino
- Reign: 22 July 1444 – 10 September 1482
- Predecessor: Oddantonio
- Successor: Guidobaldo I
- Born: 7 June 1422; Castello di Petroia, Gubbio, Papal States
- Died: 10 September 1482 (aged 60); Ferrara, Duchy of Ferrara
- Noble family: Montefeltro
- Spouses: Gentile Brancaleoni (m. 1437; died 1457) Battista Sforza (m. 1460; died 1472)
- Issue: Costanza di Montefeltro (December 1460 – February 1461); Giovanna di Montefeltro (1462–1514); Isabetta di Montefeltro (c. 1464–1521); Costanza di Montefeltro (1466–1518); Violanta di Montefeltro; Agnese di Montefeltro (1470–1522); Guidobaldo da Montefeltro (1472–1508)
- Father: Guidantonio da Montefeltro, or possibly Bernardino Ubaldini della Carda

Federico da Montefeltro, also known as Federico III da Montefeltro (7 June 1422 – 10 September 1482), was one of the most successful mercenary captains (condottieri) of the Italian Renaissance. He became the lord of Urbino in 1444, and ruled the city as its duke from 1474 until his death. In addition to his considerable reputation for martial skill and honor, he was a renowned intellectual humanist and civic leader. Montefeltro commissioned the construction of a great library, perhaps the largest of Italy after the Vatican's, complete with a team of scribes in its scriptorium. He also assembled a large humanistic court in his Ducal Palace, designed by Luciano Laurana and Francesco di Giorgio Martini.

== Biography ==
Federico da Montefeltro and His Son Guidobaldo (c. 1475), by Justus van Gent or (and) Pedro Berruguete

Federico was born in Castello di Petroia in Gubbio. Guidantonio da Montefeltro, lord of Urbino, Gubbio and Casteldurante, and Duke of Spoleto acknowledged Federico as his illegitimate son. Two years later he was legitimized by Pope Martin V, with the consent of Guidantonio's wife, Caterina Colonna, who was Martin's niece. However, there were persistent rumours that Federico was not Guidantonio's son, but his grandson. Guidantonio had an illegitimate daughter named Aura, who, in 1420, married Bernardino Ubaldini della Carda, a captain in Guidantonio's employ. It was rumoured that, being without a son and heir at the time, Guidantonio took his daughter's firstborn son soon after birth and passed the child off as his own. This rumour was recorded by various commentators during Federico's lifetime, including Pope Pius II.

In the aftermath of the Peace of Ferrara (see Wars in Lombardy) in 1433, he lived in Venice and Mantua as a hostage. In 1437 he was knighted by Holy Roman Emperor Sigismund, and in the same year, he married Gentile Brancaleoni in Gubbio.

At sixteen, he began a career as condottiero under Niccolò Piccinino.

On 22 July 1444, his half-brother Oddantonio da Montefeltro, recently created Duke of Urbino by Pope Eugene IV, was assassinated in a conspiracy: Federico, whose participation in the plot has never been firmly established, subsequently seized the city of Urbino. However he was recognized only as Count of Urbino because not heir of the ducal title created for Oddantonio (Federico was created Duke only in 1474), the financial situation of the small dukedom being in disarray, he continued to wage war as a condottiero. His first condotta was for Francesco I Sforza, with 300 knights: Federico was also one of the few condottieri of the time to have a reputation for inspiring loyalty among his followers. In the pay of the Sforza—for Federico never fought for free—he transferred Pesaro to their control, and, for 13,000 florins, received Fossombrone as his share, infuriating Sigismondo Pandolfo Malatesta. Despite Federico's efforts, the Sforza sovereignty in the Marche was dismantled in the following years. When Sforza left for Lombardy, Sigismondo instigated a riot in Fossombrone, but Federico reconquered it three days later.

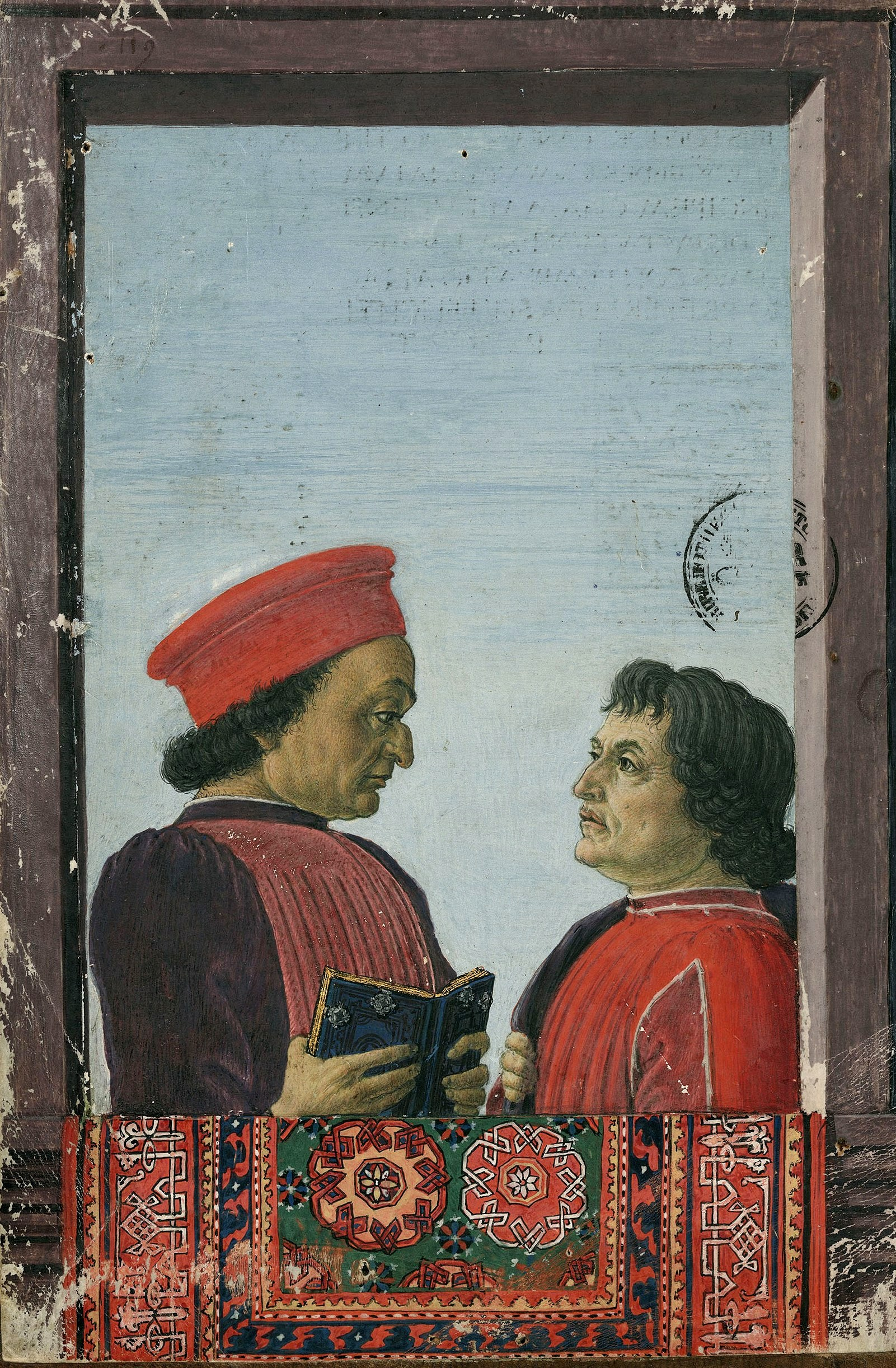
Federico Montefeltro with humanist writer Cristoforo Landino, in an example of Oriental carpets in Renaissance painting, 15th century

After six years in the service of Florence, Federico was hired in 1450 by Sforza, now Duke of Milan. However, he could not perform his duties as he lost his right eye during a joust. After the loss of the eye, Federico had surgeons remove the bridge of his nose (which had been injured in the incident) and eyelid.

In 1453 Federico himself risked losing his healthy eye as the wound reopened. The Peace of Lodi of the following year seemed to deprive him of occasions to exhibit his ability as a military commander. In 1458 the death of both Alfonso and of his beloved illegitimate son, Buonconte, did not help to raise Federico's mood. His fortunes recovered when Pius II, a man of culture like him, became Pope and made him Gonfaloniere of the Holy Roman Church. After some notable exploits in the Kingdom of Naples, he fought in the Marche against Malatesta, soundly defeating him at the Cesano river near Senigallia (1462). The following year he captured Fano and Senigallia, taking Sigismondo Pandolfo prisoner. The Pope made him vicar of the conquered territories.

In 1464 the new Pope Paul II called him to push back the Anguillara, from whom he regained much of the northern Lazio for Papal control. The following year he captured Cesena and Bertinoro in Romagna. In 1466 Francesco Sforza died, and Federico assisted his young son Galeazzo Sforza in the government of Milan, and also commanded the campaign against Bartolomeo Colleoni. In 1467 he took part in the Battle of Molinella. In 1469, on the death of Sigismondo Pandolfo, Paul sent him to occupy Rimini: however, fearing that an excessive Papal power in the area could also menace his home base of Urbino, once having entered Rimini Federico kept it for himself. After defeating the Papal forces in a great battle on 30 August 1469, he ceded it to Sigismondo's son, Roberto Malatesta.

The matter was solved by the election of Pope Sixtus IV, who married his favourite nephew Giovanni Della Rovere to Federico's daughter Giovanna and gave him the title of Duke of Urbino in 1474; Malatesta married his other daughter Elisabetta. Now Federico fought against his former patrons the Florentines, caught in the Pope's attempt to carve out a state for his nephew Girolamo Riario. In 1478, Federico was involved in the Pazzi conspiracy; in the aftermath of the failed plot, he carried out attacks on the territory of Lorenzo de' Medici.

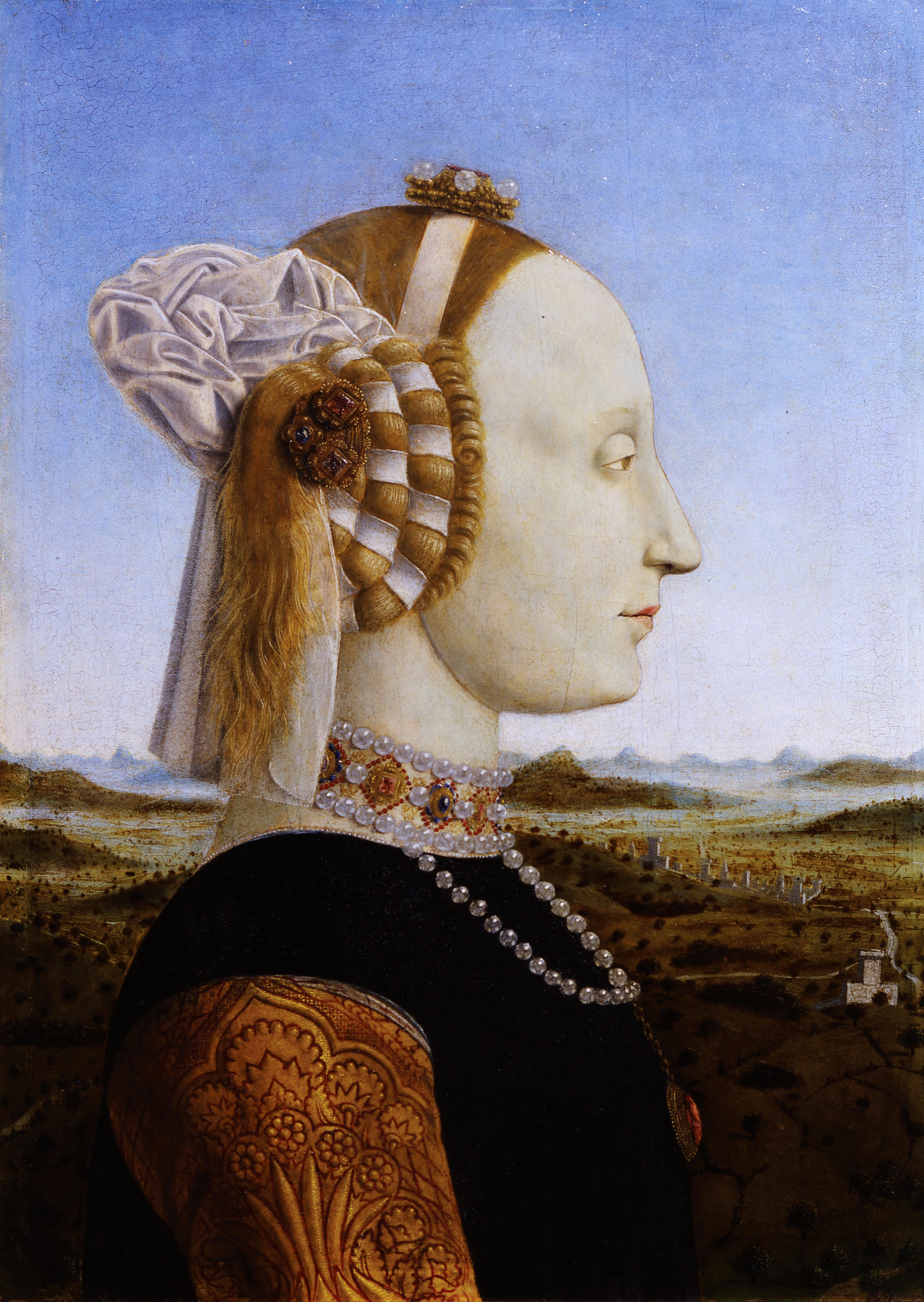
Battista Sforza, the second wife of Federico. Portrait by Piero della Francesca

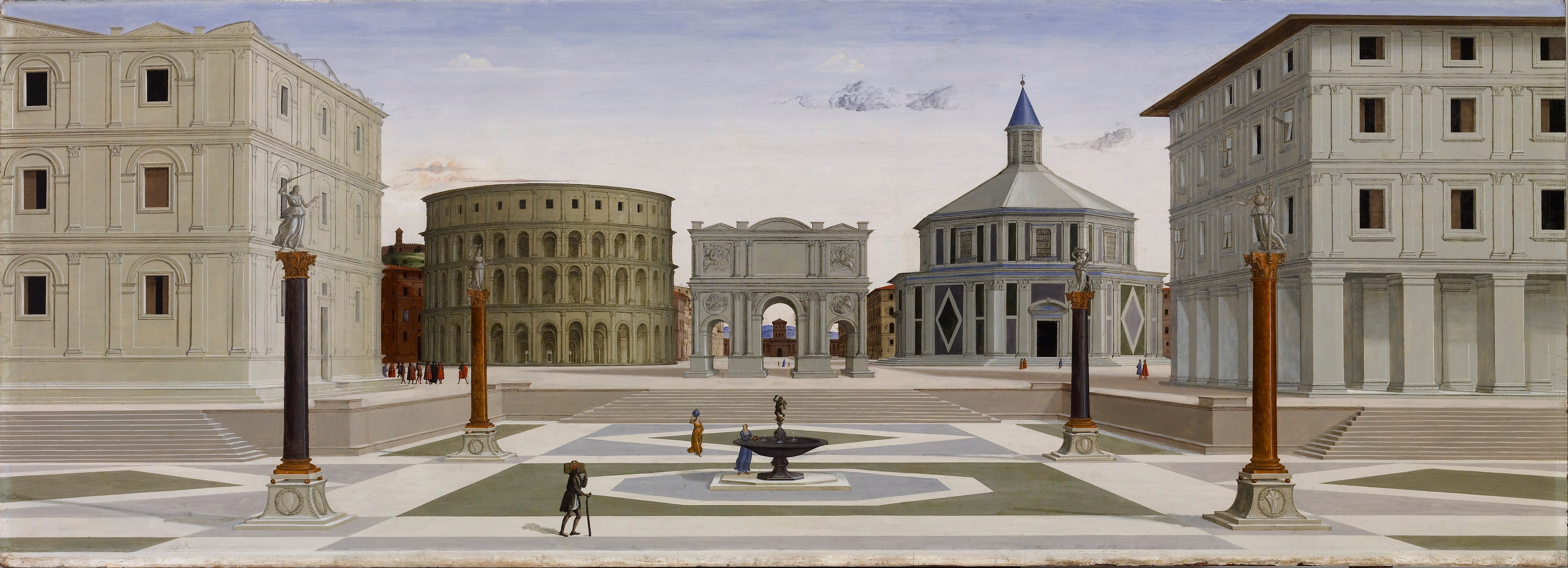
This painting by Fra Carneval, representing an ideal Roman city, was commissioned for the palace of Montefeltro.

However, after the death of his beloved second wife Battista Sforza (daughter of Elisabetta Malatesta and Alessandro Sforza), who died from pneumonia after giving birth to their seventh child at 25 years old, he spent much of his time in the magnificent palace in Urbino. The Duke had lost the mate he described as "the delight of my public and private hours"; a contemporary, speaking of their relationship, had called them two souls in one body. In 1482 he was called to command the army of Ercole I of Ferrara in his war against Venice, but was struck by fever and died in Ferrara in September.

Federico's son, Guidobaldo, was married to Elisabetta Gonzaga, the daughter of Federico I Gonzaga, lord of Mantua. With Guidobaldo's death in 1508, the duchy of Urbino passed through Giovanna to the papal family of Della Rovere—nephews of Guidobaldo.

== Achievements ==
=== Arts patronage ===
Federico, nicknamed "the Light of Italy", is a landmark figure in the history of the Italian Renaissance for his contributions to enlightened culture.

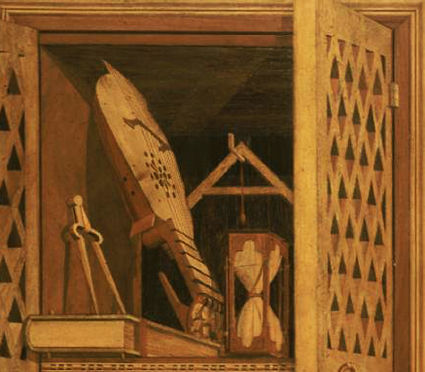
Detail of the Studiolo di Gubbio of Federico da Montefeltro

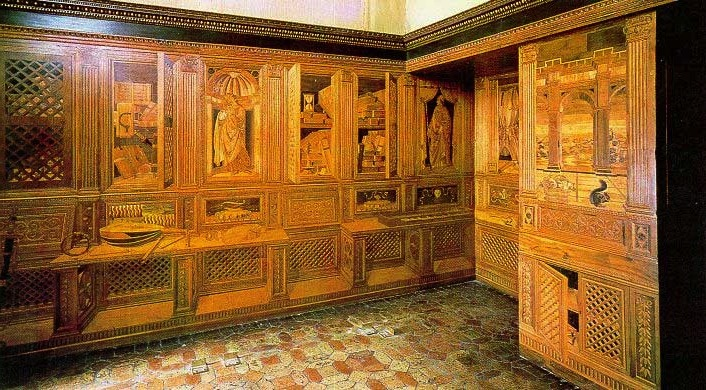
Studiolo of Federico III da Montefeltro

=== Role in society ===
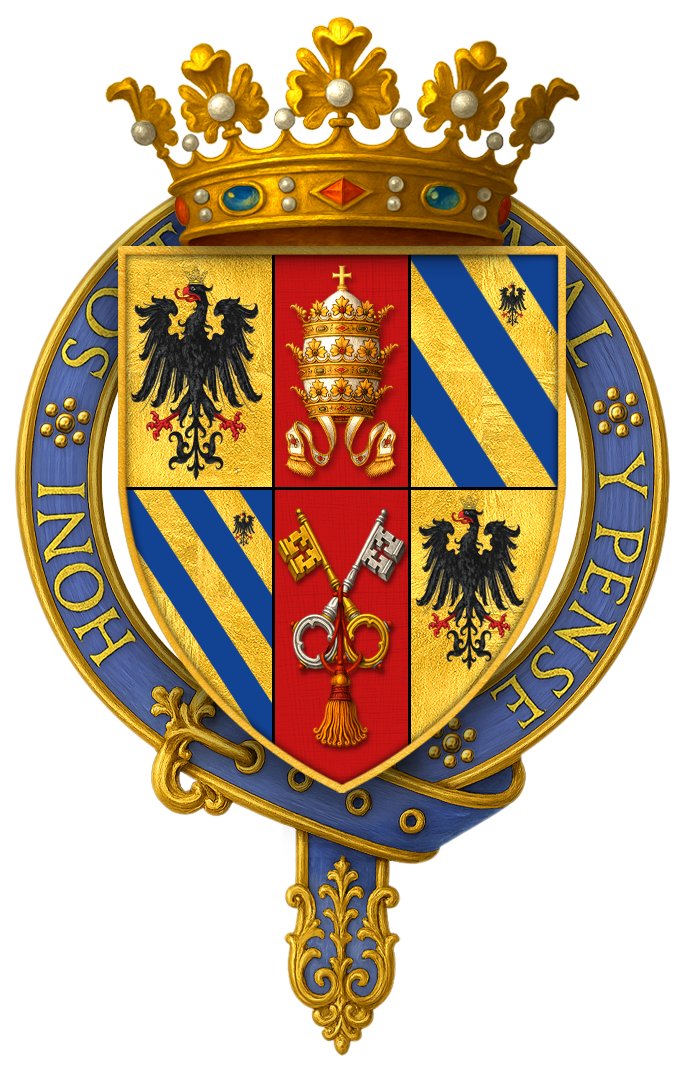
Garter-encircled Arms of Federico da Montefeltro, Duke of Urbino, KG

His academic interests were the classics, particularly history and philosophy.

All his personal and professional achievements were financed through mercenary warfare. Commentators insist on his dedication to the well-being of his soldiers explaining why his men proved loyal to him and why Federico technically never lost a war. He was decorated with almost every military honor. Edward IV of England made him a Knight of the Most Noble Order of the Garter; he wears the Garter bound round his left knee in the portrait by Pedro Berruguete.

== See also ==
- Dukes of Urbino
- Condottieri
- Antonio da Montefeltro
- Diptych of Federico da Montefeltro and Battista Sforza
- Bible of Federico da Montefeltro
- Renaissance in Urbino

== Footnotes ==
Preceded by Oddantonio	Duke of Urbino; 1444–1482	Succeeded by Guidobaldo I
