= Bust of Isabella of Aragon =

Marble sculpture by Francesco Laurana

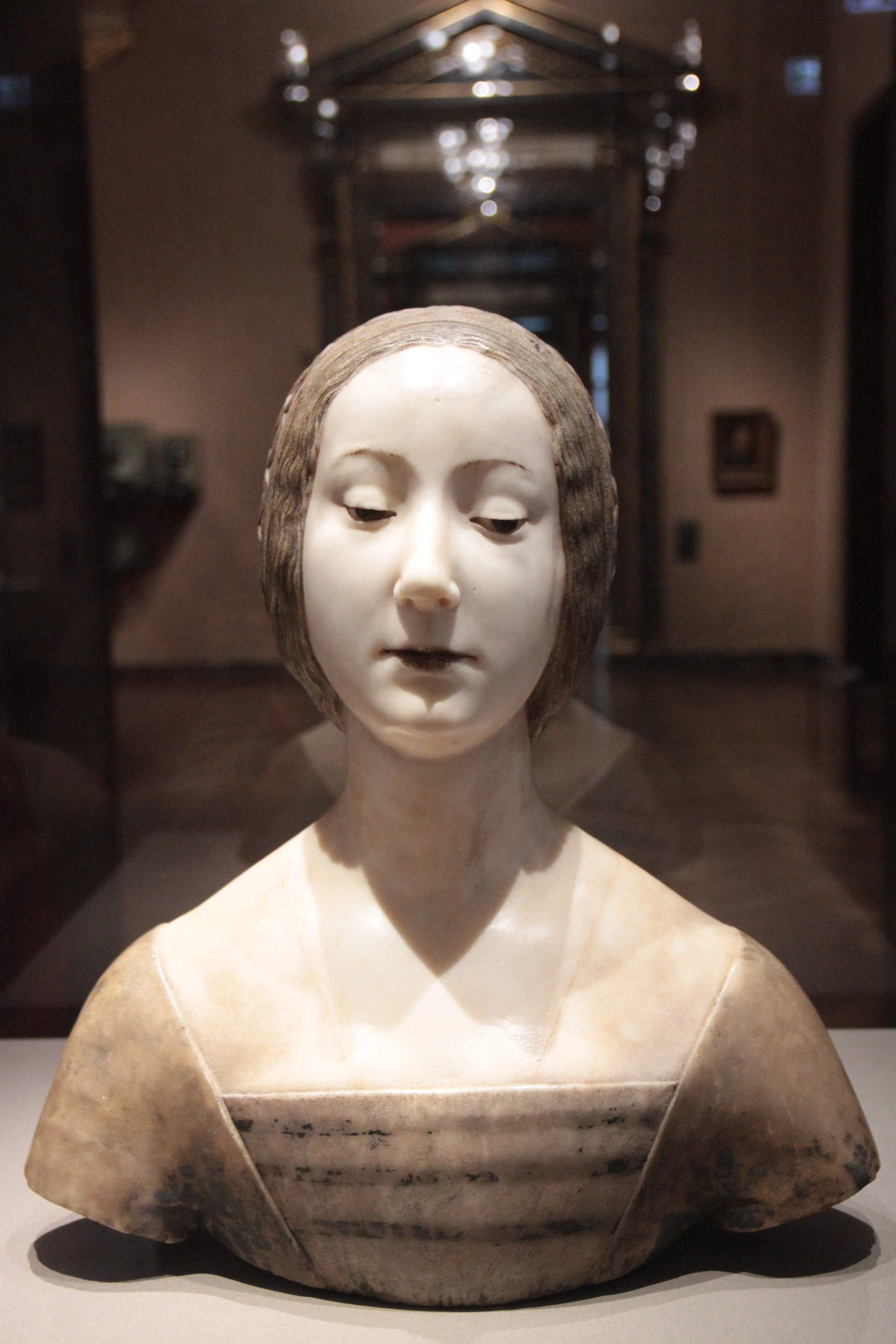

The Bust of Isabella of Aragon or Ideal Portrait of Laura is a marble sculpture by Francesco Laurana, now in the Kunsthistorisches Museum in Vienna. It is the only one of the artist's sculptures to retain the coloured wax he applied to it. Its idealisation draws on the works of Piero della Francesca, which Laurana may have seen in Urbino, and leads some to identify it as an ideal portrait of Petrarch's Laura.

It is generally dated to 1487–1488 and held to show Isabella of Aragon, probably meaning it was commissioned to mark her marriage to Gian Galeazzo Sforza in Naples in 1488. Some theorise that instead it shows Ippolita Maria Sforza and dates to 1475, when the sculptor was in Naples, whilst others argue it shows Isabella's mother Isabella I of Castile. The museum currently calls it an "ideal portrait of Laura".
