= Luciano Laurana =

Dalmatian architect and engineer (c. 1420–1479)

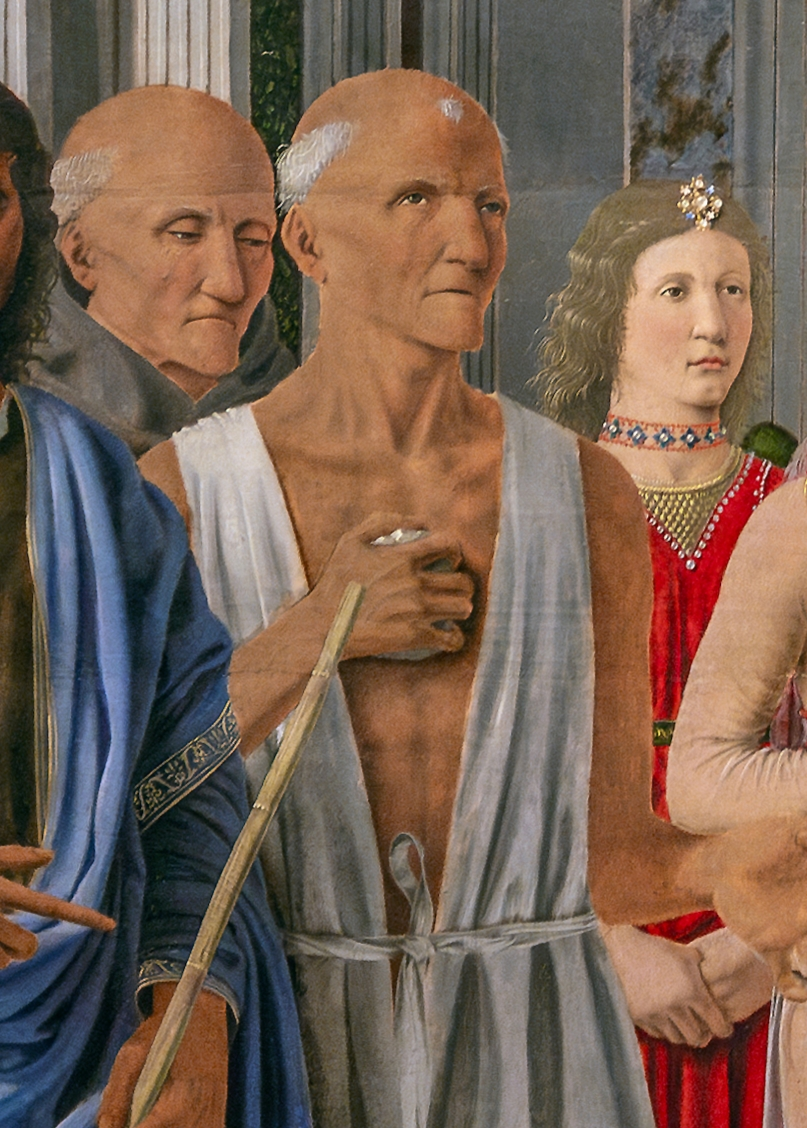
Presumed portrait of Luciano Laurana, depicted as Saint Jerome, the patron saint of Dalmatia, detail of the Brera Altarpiece (1472-4) by Piero della Francesca

Luciano Laurana (Lutiano Dellaurana, Croatian: Lucijan Vranjanin) (c. 1420 – 1479) was a Dalmatian architect and engineer from the historic Vrana settlement near the town of Zadar in Dalmatia, (today in Croatia, then part of the Republic of Venice) After education by his father Martin in Vrana settlement, he worked mostly in Italy during the late 15th century. He was principal designer of the Palazzo Ducale of Urbino and one of the main figures in 15th-century Italian architecture. He considerably influenced the development of Renaissance architecture. His projects were accompanied with notes in the Croatian glagolitic script, as witnessed by the famous Bernardo Baldi. He was a relative of the sculptor Francesco Laurana.

== Biography ==
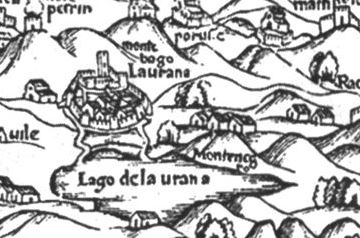
Laurana's native Vrana in early 16th century, by Matteo Pagano

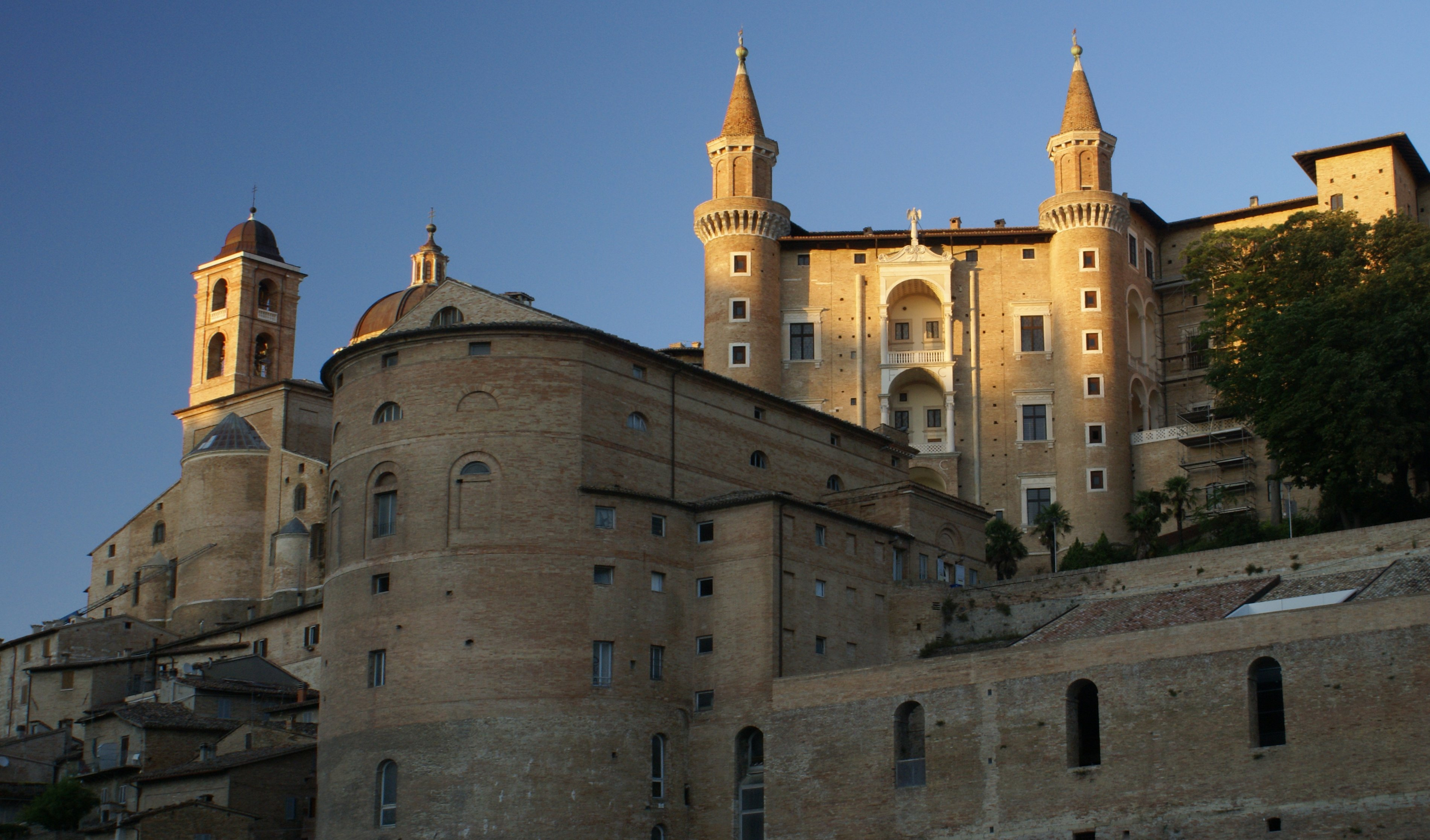
Cathedral and Palazzo Ducale, Urbino.

Laurana was born in Vrana near Zadar in Dalmatia. Later in life, the Italians in Urbino called him Schiavone, from his native land of Schiavonia, the name wherewith the region was called by the Venetians, which was also used as an exonym for the local population. Little is known about his early years. His father Martin was a stonecutter in Zadar, who worked together with the famous sculptor Giorgio da Sebenico on the Šibenik Cathedral (Cathedral of St. James).

Around 1465 he is known to have collaborated in Mantua with Leon Battista Alberti. From 1466 to 1472 he directed the works of the new palace commissioned by Federico III da Montefeltro, duke of Urbino. The exact attribution of the works is still disputed, as it is known that also Francesco di Giorgio had a role in the construction: the innovative façade, however, is traditionally recognized as Laurana's. Laurana improved Italian Renaissance tradition by using a system of columns, pilasters, and arcades to produce elegant facades and spacious rooms. In the arcaded palace courtyard Laurana achieved a rhythmic lightness, amplitude, and sophistication far in advance of contemporary Florentine work.

Later he worked in Naples for the king Ferrante II of Naples. From 1472 he was in Pesaro, where he attended the construction of the Castle (Rocca) until his death, occurred in 1479. The famous anonymous picture La città ideale, housed in the Urbino National Gallery, has been attributed to him.

== Nationality ==
Encyclopædia Britannica describes Luciano Laurana as "one of the main figures in 15th-century Italian architecture". The Architecture Book, The Architectural historian in America, and Enciclopedia Italiana identify Laurana as an "Italian architect".

He is internationally known as an Italian artist, even if he is today considered by Croatians in the overviews of their art, with the name "Lucijan Vranjanin".

== See also ==
- Schiavonia
- Palazzo Ducale
- Quattrocento
