= Francesco Laurana =

Dalmatian sculptor and medallist (c. 1430–1502)

- Born: Franjo Vranjanin; 1430; Vrana, Dalmatia, Republic of Venice (modern Croatia)
- Died: 1502 (aged 71–72); Marseille/Avignon
- Occupations: Sculptor and medallist
- Notable work: Bust of Isabella of Aragon (c. 1487–1488)

Francesco Laurana, also known as Francesco de la Vrana (Croatian: Franjo Vranjanin; c. 1430 – before 12 March 1502) was a Dalmatian sculptor and medallist. He was born in the territory of the Republic of Venice, in present-day Croatia. Laurana spent his mature career at the other end of Italy, moving between Naples and Sicily, and Urbino, and finally in southern France, where he died.

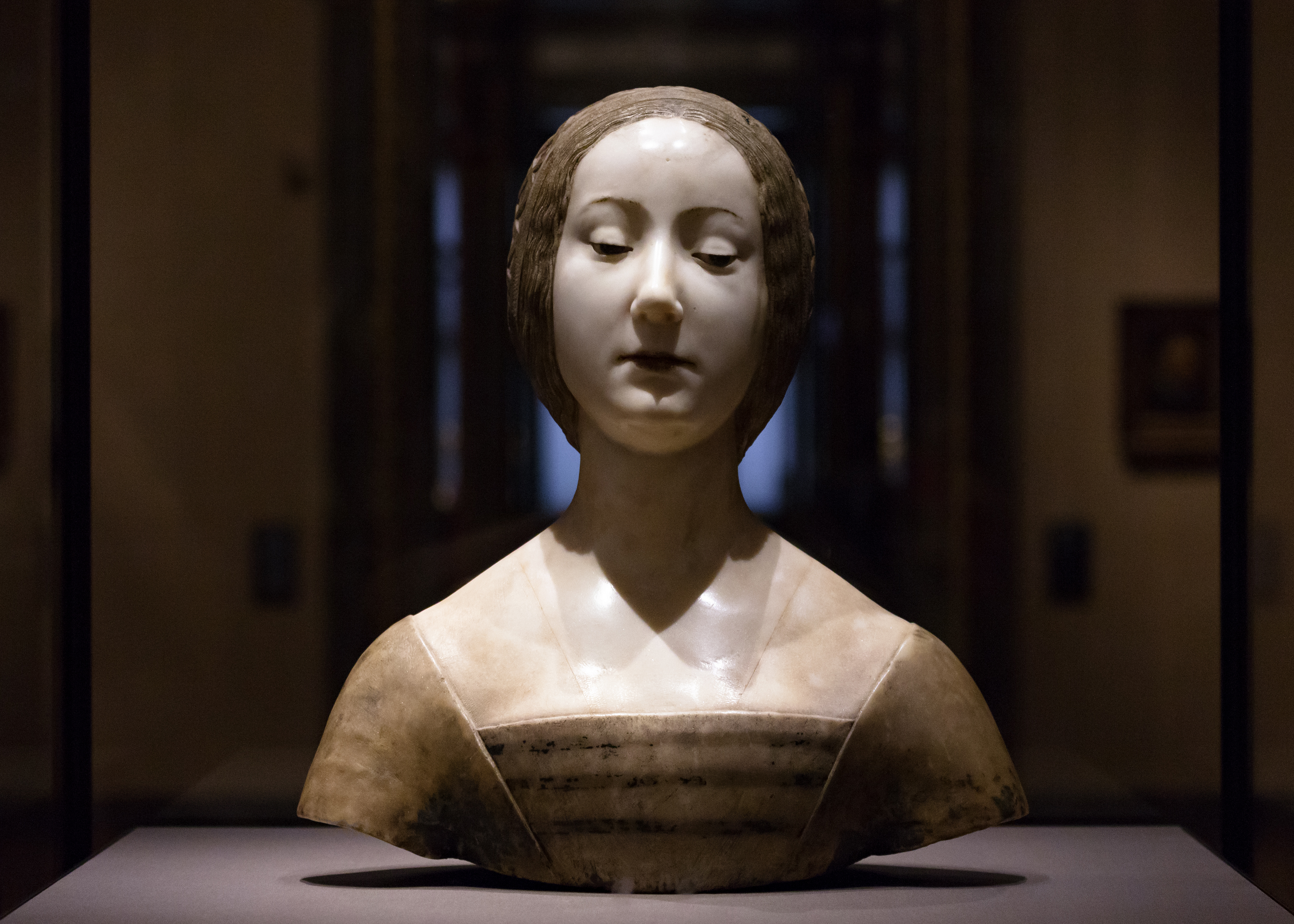
Bust of Isabella of Aragon, (ca. 1487–1488), marble, Kunsthistorisches Museum

He was one of the more significant and complex sculptors of the 15th century – complex because of his activities within varying cultural circles and his exposure to differing influences. His best works evolved in the workshop tradition in collaboration with other artists. His portrait busts reveal a creative individuality that was seen as particularly fascinating in the late 19th century. Though it is impossible to chart his stylistic development, his later work made in France shows some assimilation of northern realism, which is absent from the work executed in Italy.

== Life and works ==
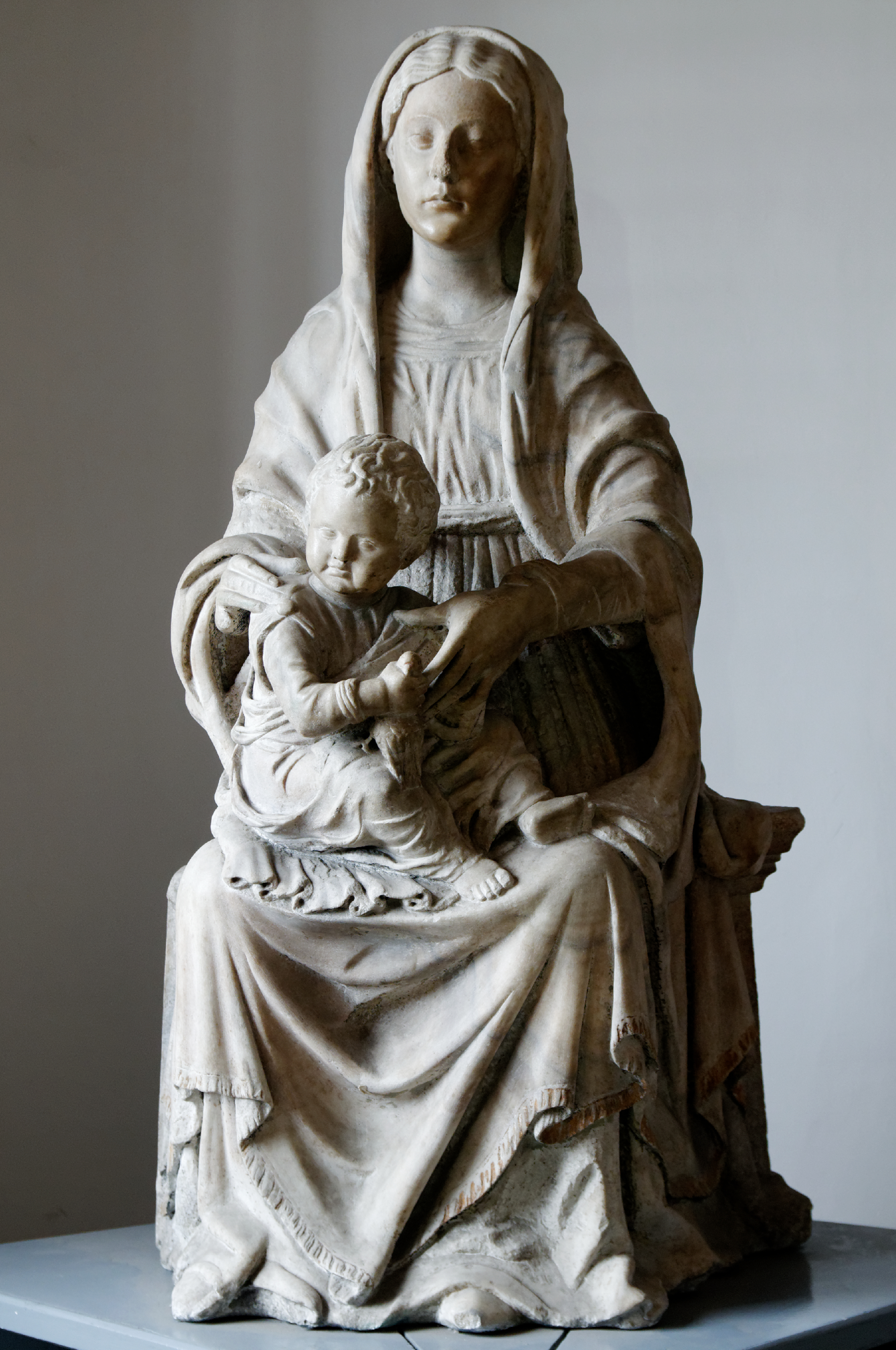
Enthroned Madonna with Child, Castel Nuovo

Laurana was born in Vrana, near Zadar, in Dalmatia. Under Venetian rule Vrana was named La Vrana, from romance de Vrana, giving the surname used by Francesco Laurana: LA VRANA -> LAVRANA which is read like LAURANA because the letter U is written as V in inscriptions in Latin.

After an apprenticeship under a sculptor, he began his solo career at Naples, where he was one of the team of sculptors finishing the triumphal arch of Castel Nuovo for Alfonso V of Aragon. (Note: Laurana was first documented in 1453, as Francesco Adzara (Francesco da Zara).) After the death of Alfonso (1458) he was called to Aix-en-Provence to the court of René d'Anjou, the former and still titular King of Naples, who commissioned him to do a series of bronze portrait medals of personages at the court. (Note: Some bear dates 1461, 1463 and 1466.)

From 1466 to 1471 Laurana was in Sicily. Works of this period include the Mastrantonio Chapel and the tomb of Pietro Speciale in the church of S. Francesco in Palermo, the side door of the church of St. Margherite in Sciacca, Madonna and Child sculptures in the cathedrals of Palermo (1471) (Note: Signed and dated.) and Noto, and a bust allegedly portraying Eleanor of Aragon, now in the Palazzo Abatellis in Palermo, Sicily.

In 1471 he traveled to Naples where he executed the sculpture of the Virgin in the Sta. Barbara Chapel. From 1474 to 1477 Laurana spent three years in Urbino, where fellow Dalmatian sculptor Luciano Laurana worked. Though both appear to have originated from Vrana, there are no elements that indicate that the two were related. He then went to Marseille, where he built a small chapel in the Cathedral of S. Marie Majeure (1475–1481), the first structure in France designed entirely in the Renaissance style. His workshop in Marseille created the St. Lazarus marble altar as well as the retable of the Calvary in St. Didier d'Avignon, and the tombs of Giovanni Cossa at Sainte-Marthe de Tarascon and Charles, comte du Maine, in Le Mans. (Note: Illustration.)

Laurana died at Marseille or Avignon, in 1502.

== Gallery ==
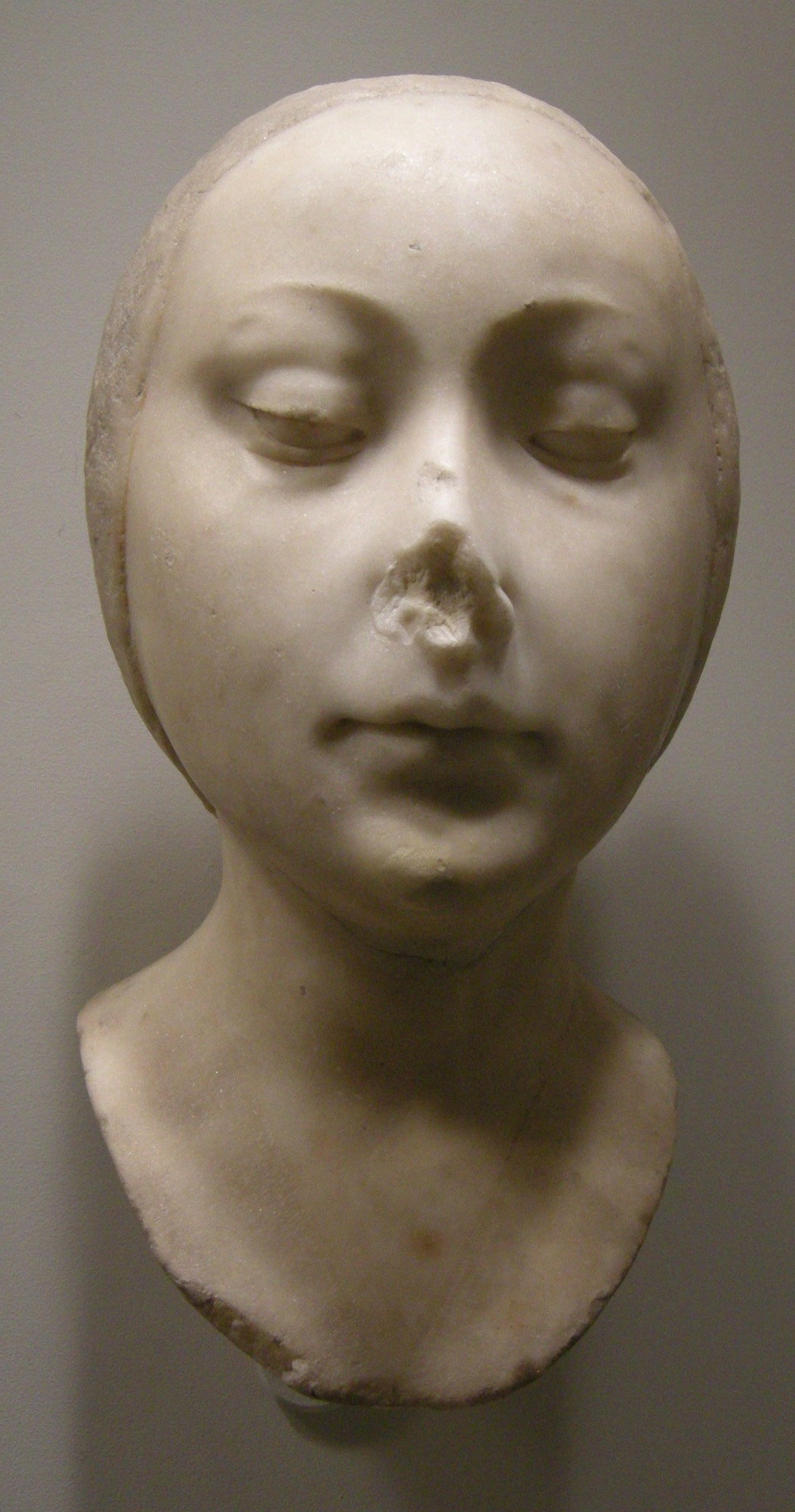
Young woman, circa 1475

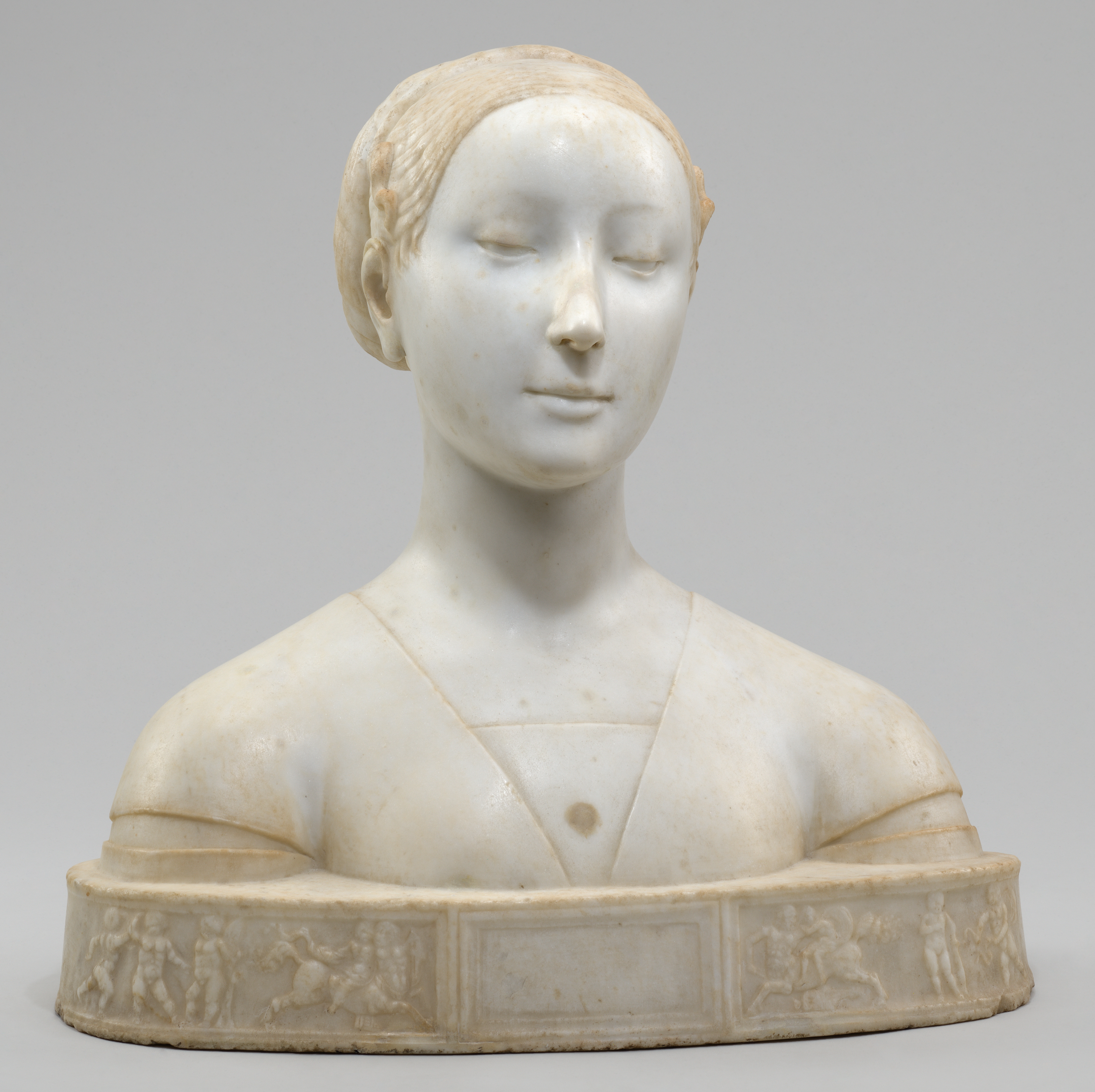
House of Aragon Princess, circa 1475

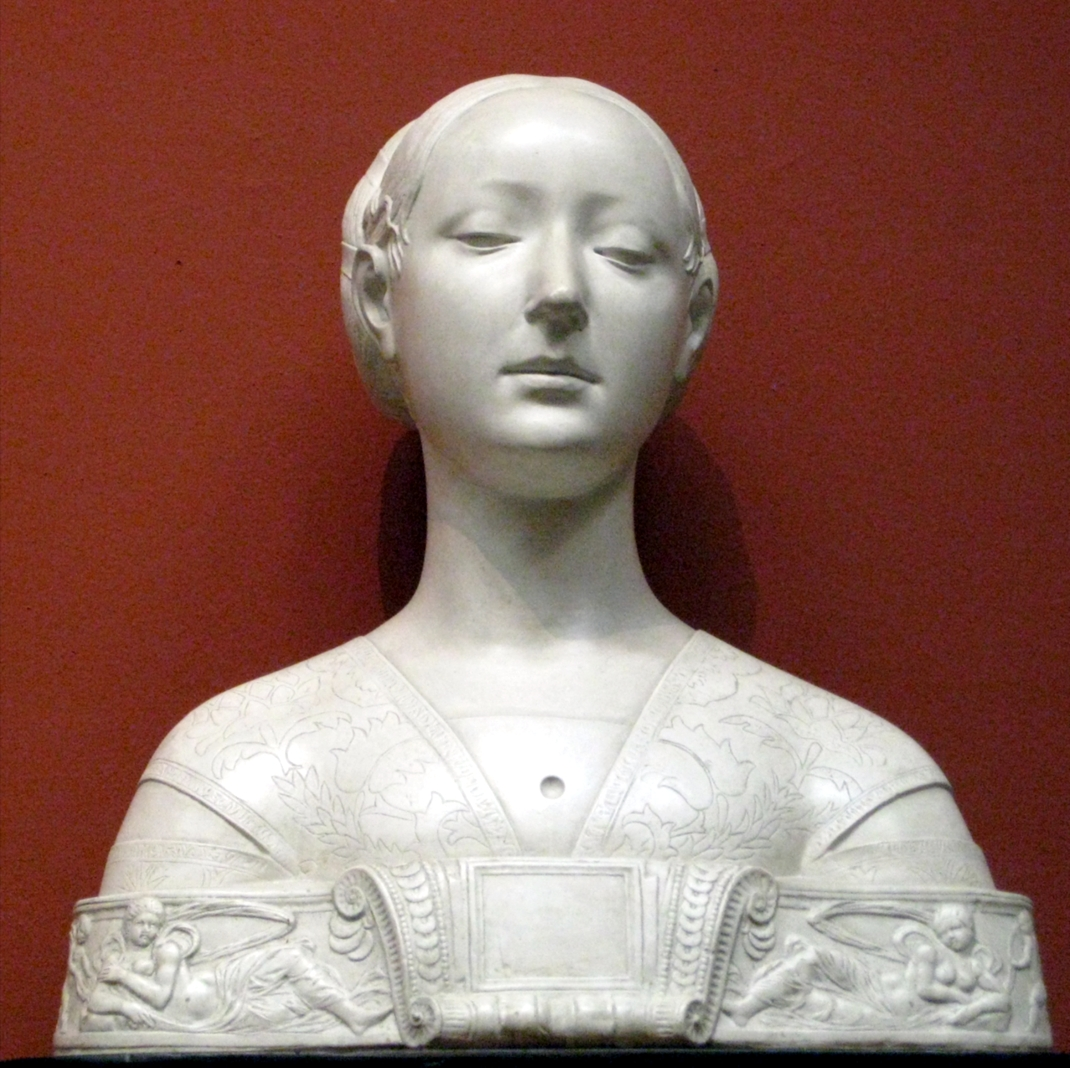
A Princess of the House of Naples, circa 1472

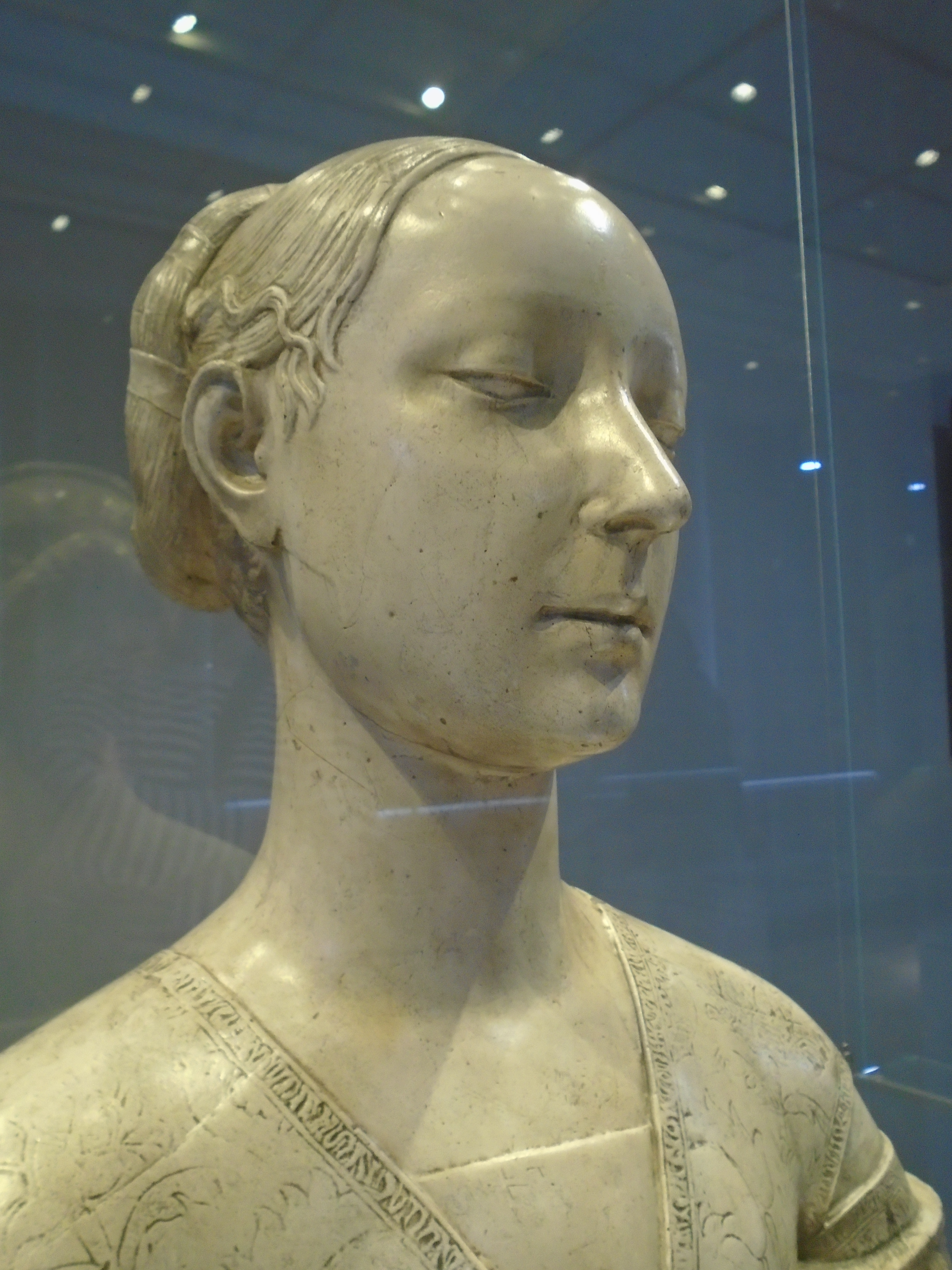
Princess of the House of Naples, detail

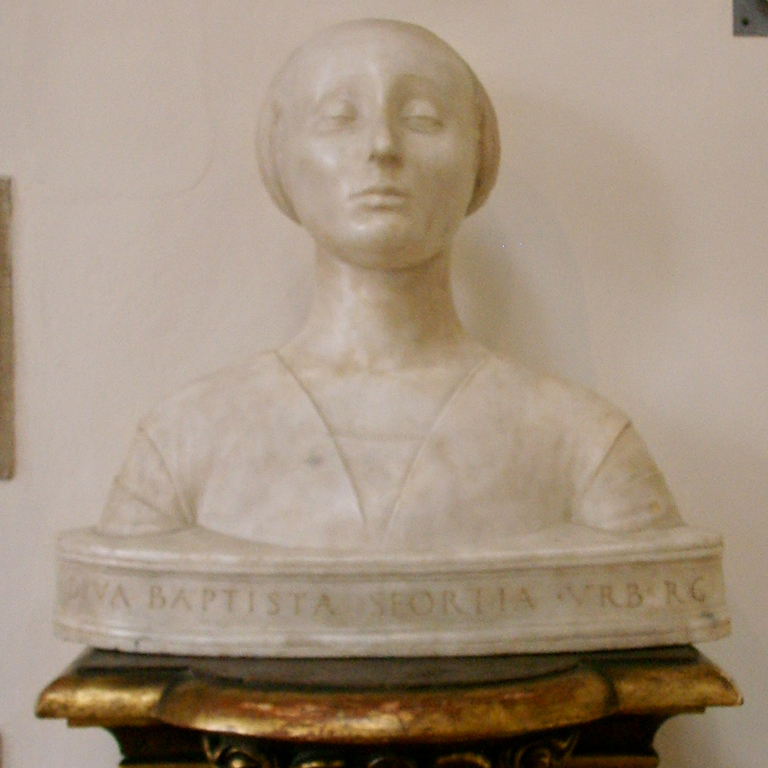
Portrait of Battista Sforza, circa 1472

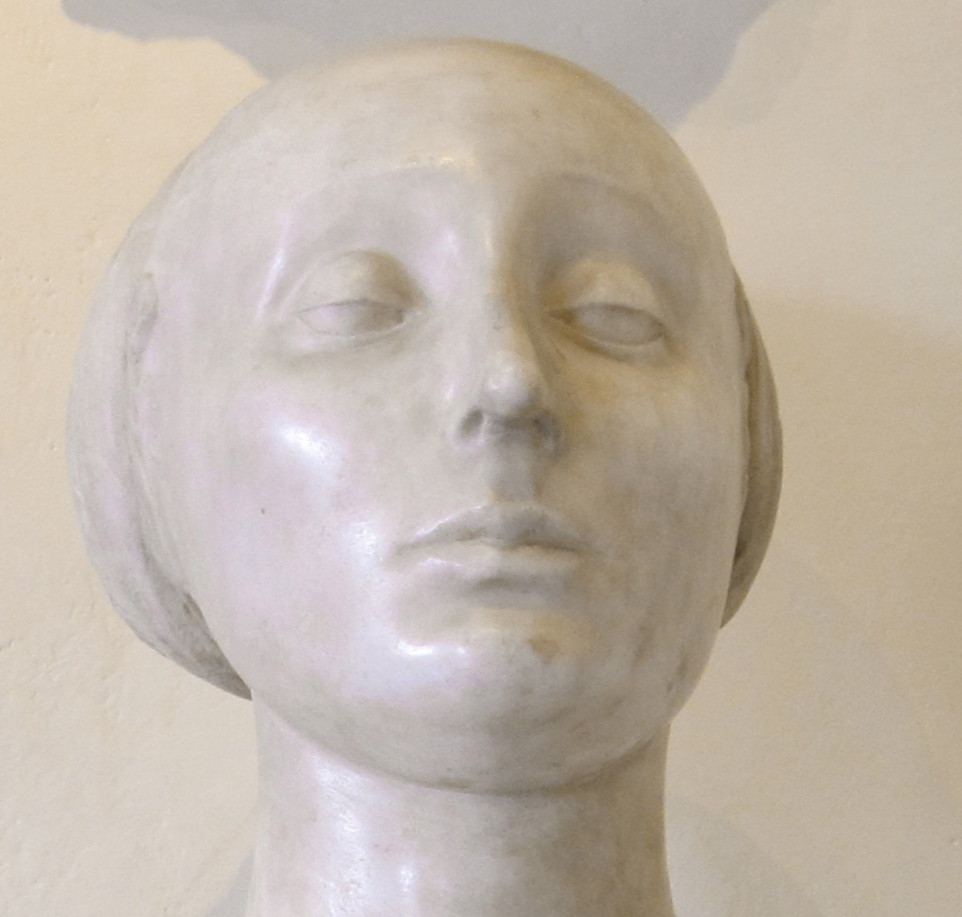
Portrait of Battista Sforza, detail

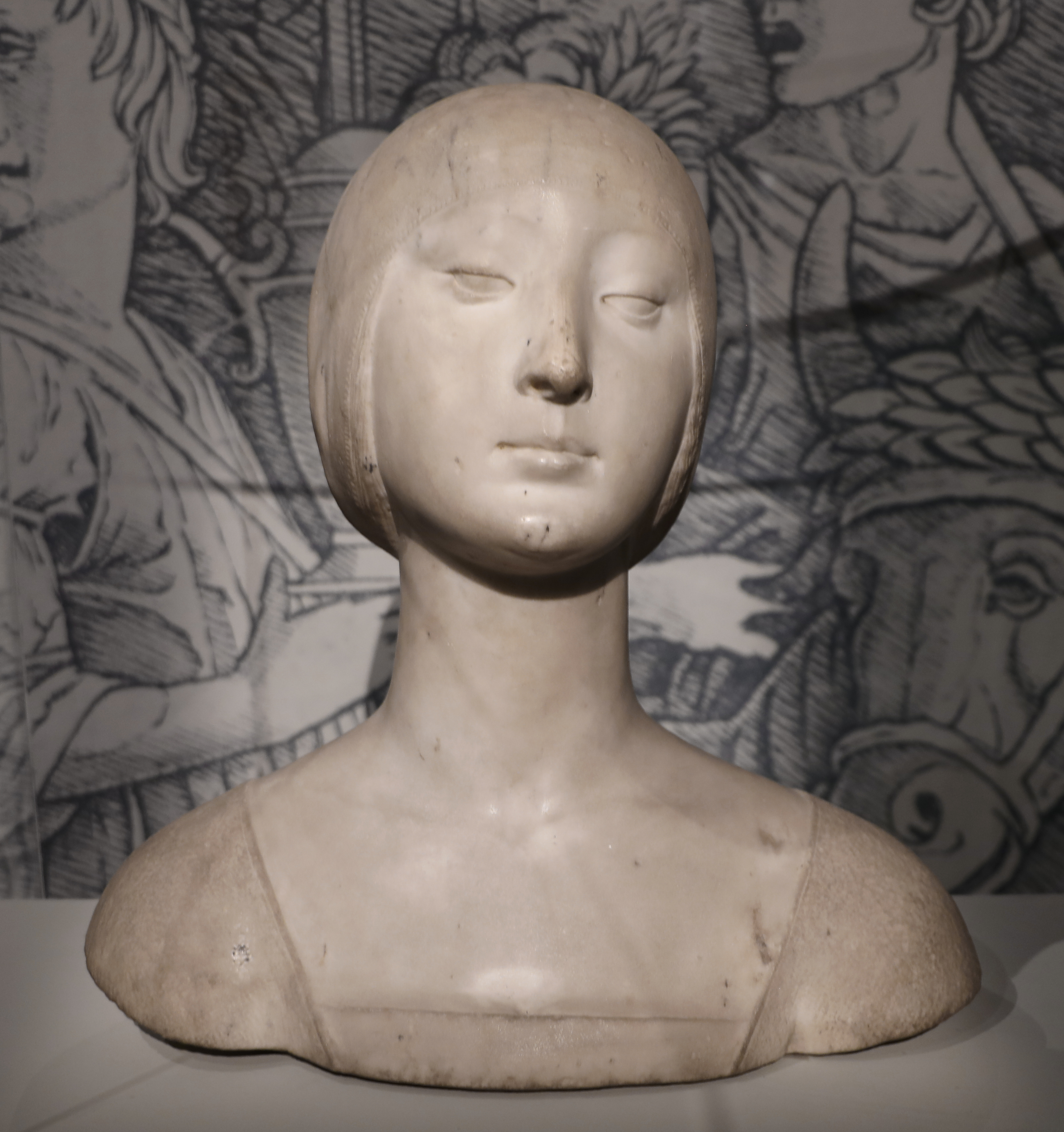
Bust of Neapolitan Princess, circa 1490

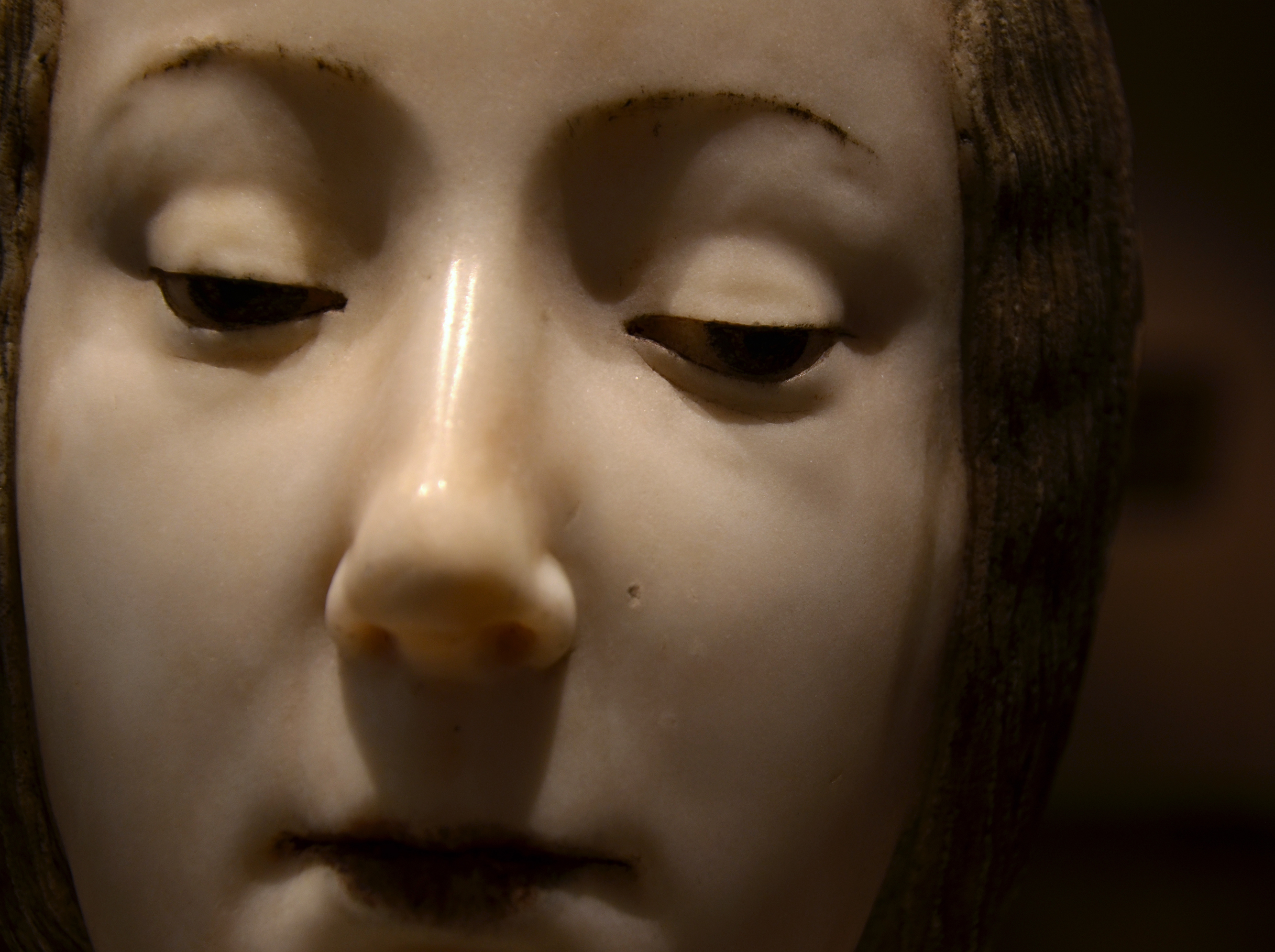
An Ideal Portrait of Laura, detail, circa 1490

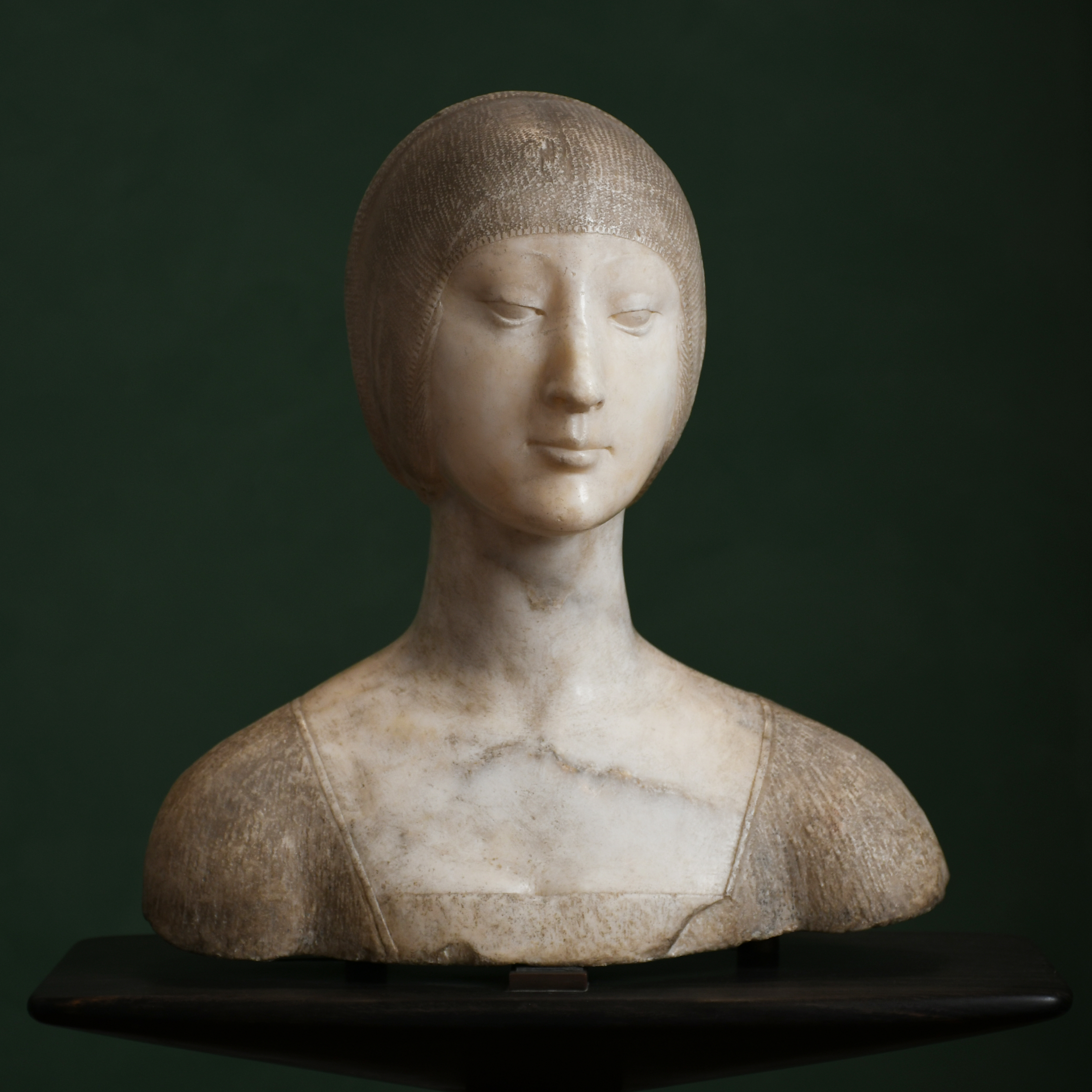
Portrait of Eleanor of Aragon, circa 1490

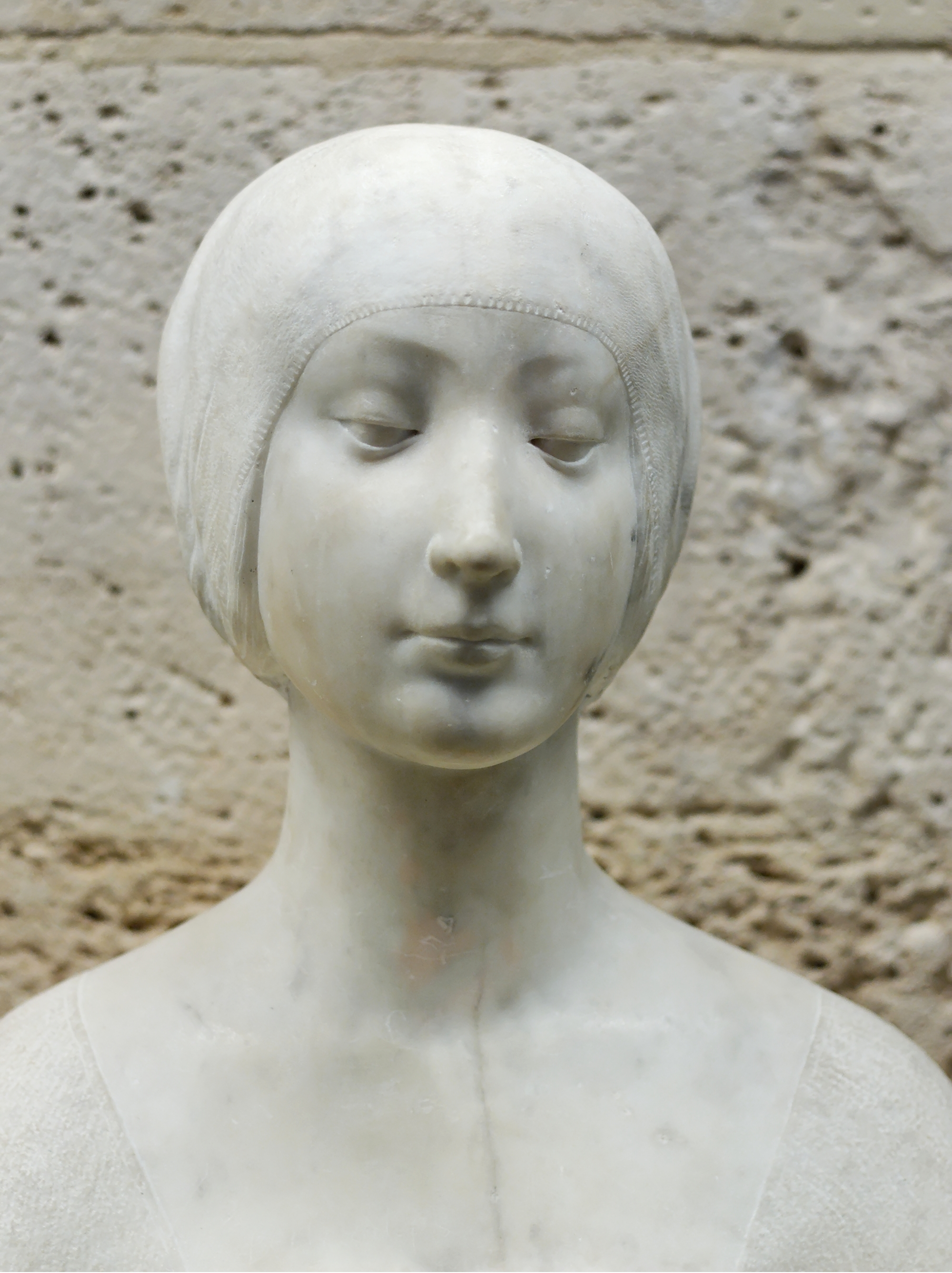
Bust of a Princess, circa 1471

== See also ==
- Croats of Italy
- Italian Renaissance sculpture
