= Lake Vrana (Dalmatia) =

- Vransko jezero (Croatian)
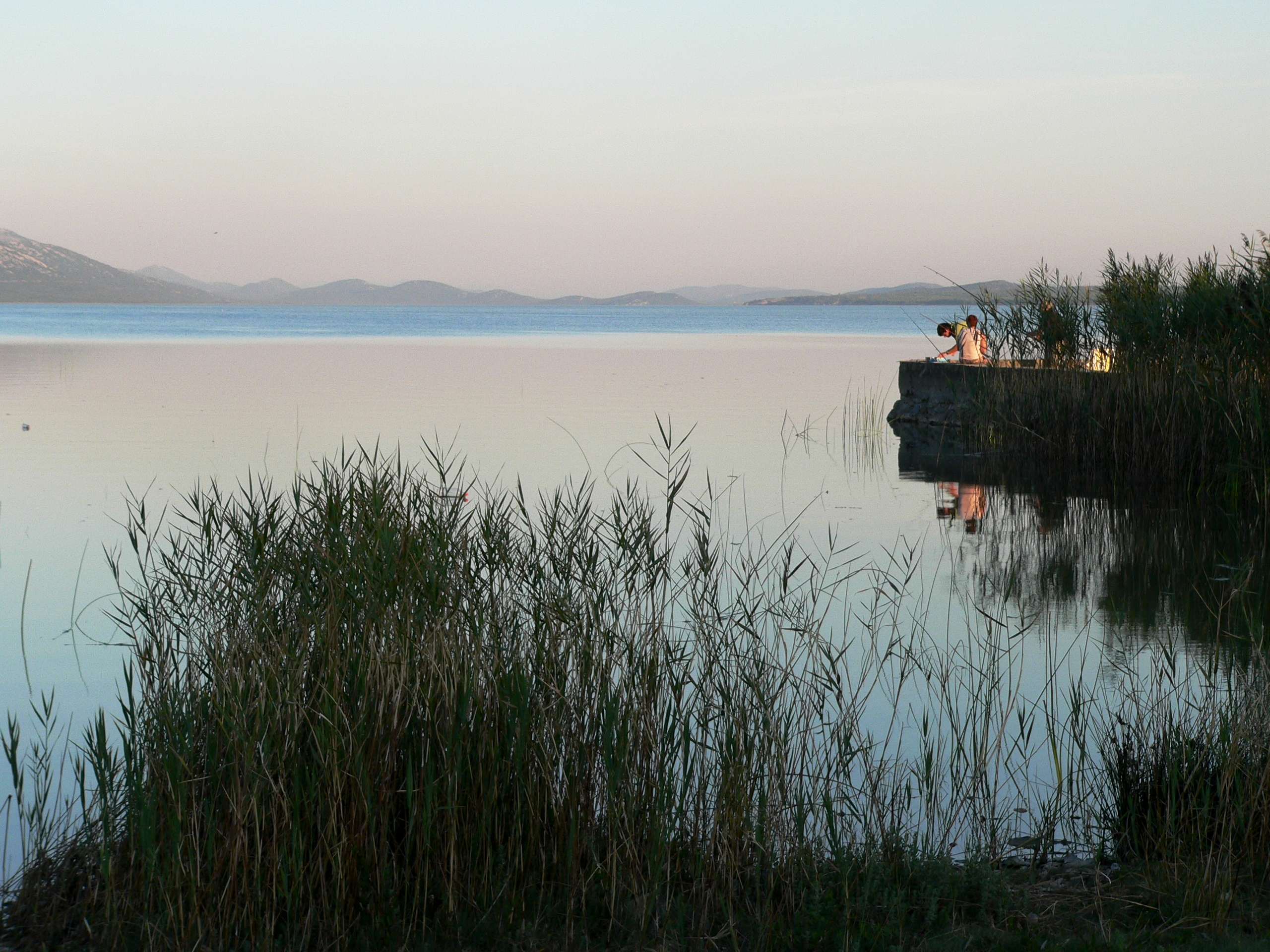
- Lake Vrana

- Location within Croatia
- Interactive map of Lake Vrana
- Location: Zadar County and Šibenik-Knin County, Croatia
- Coordinates: 43°53′38″N 15°34′33″E
- Type: lake
- Surface area: 30.7 square kilometres (11.9 sq mi)
- Max. depth: 4 metres (13 ft)
- Surface elevation: 0.1 metres (0.33 ft)

Designations

Ramsar Wetland
- Official name: Vransko Lake
- Designated: 2 February 2013
- Reference no.: 2109

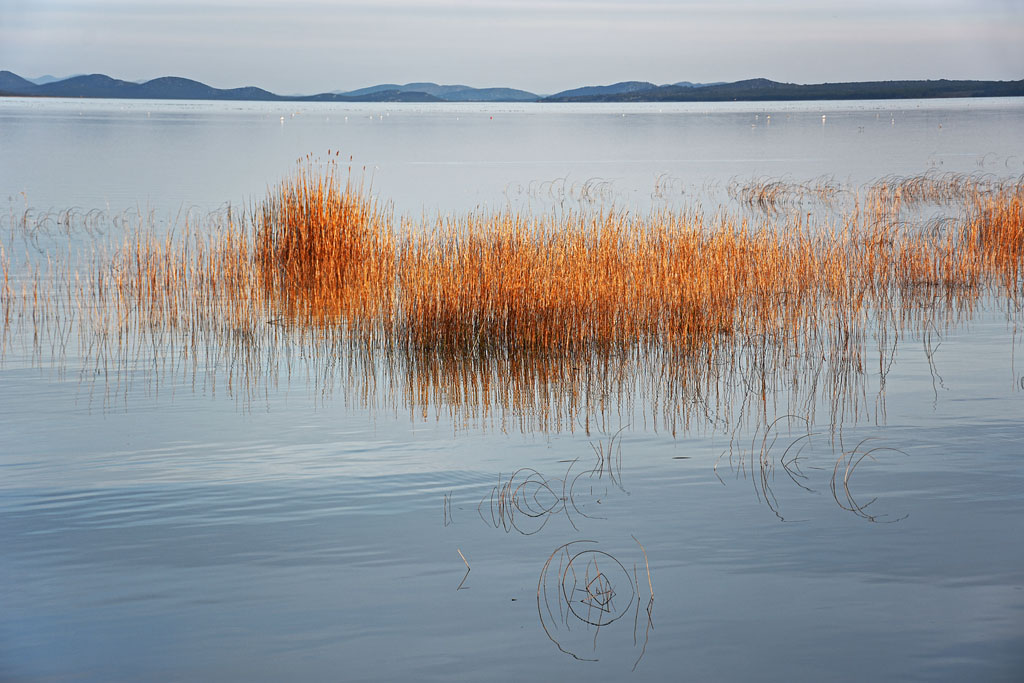
Ornithological park

Lake Vrana (Croatian: Vransko jezero) is the largest lake in Croatia. It is a designated nature park (park prirode), a legislatively protected nature reserve. It is located in the region of Dalmatia, straddling the border of Zadar and Šibenik-Knin counties, in close proximity to towns and municipalities of Benkovac, Pirovac, Pakoštane, Stankovci and Tisno.

== Description ==
The area of the lake is 30.7 square kilometres (11.9 sq mi), the elevation of its surface above sea level is only 0.1 metres (0.33 ft), while its maximum depth is 4 metres (13 ft).

The lake is in a karst valley filled with water and is a rare example cryptodepression. The dominant feature of the park is a special ornithological reserve, an almost untouched natural habitat of birds, a rare wetland systems, full of high biodiversity and an outstanding scientific and ecological value. The lake provides an ample amount of fish for fishing enthusiasts.

== See also ==
- Protected areas of Croatia
