= Francesco de' Medici (1614–1634) =

Tuscan prince (1614–1634)

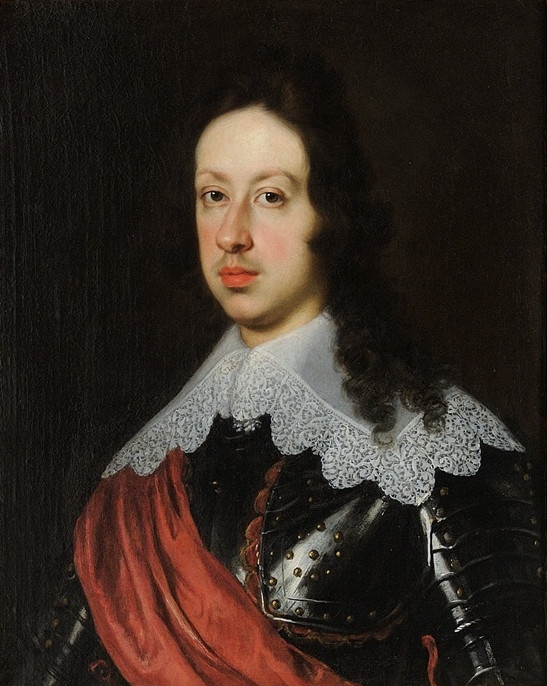
- Born: 6 October 1614; Palazzo Pitti, Florence, Tuscany
- Died: 25 July 1634 (aged 19); Regensburg, Holy Roman Empire
- House: Medici
- Father: Cosimo II of Tuscany
- Mother: Maria Maddalena of Austria

Francesco de' Medici (16 October 1614 – 25 July 1634) was the fourth son of Grand Duke Cosimo II of Tuscany and his wife, Maria Maddalena of Austria. He died unmarried.

== Biography ==
Prince Francesco was born at the Palazzo Pitti in Florence, the capital of his father's grand duchy. The Medici family had been connected to Tuscany for over three centuries and had been its sovereign rulers since 1569. Little is known about his childhood, other than that he was raised alongside his brother Mattias. He was a Tuscan prince by birth and entitled to the style of Highness. His siblings included the future Duchess of Parma, Archduchess Anna of Austria and Grand Duke Ferdinando II, himself father of the penultimate Medici grand duke.

He pursued a military career. Along with his mother and Mattias, he visited Austria in 1631 in order to meet his uncle the Emperor Ferdinand II. He fought in the Battle of Lützen during the Thirty Years' War but fled the scene. His elder brother, Grand Duke Ferdinando, reprimanded him for his conduct in a letter dated 14 July. He died from plague during the Siege of Ratisbon, 1634.

== Ancestors ==
Ancestors of Francesco de' Medici (1614–1634)

8. Cosimo I de' Medici, Grand Duke of Tuscany
4. Ferdinando I de' Medici, Grand Duke of Tuscany
9. Eleonora di Toledo
2. Cosimo II de' Medici, Grand Duke of Tuscany
10. Charles III, Duke of Lorraine
5. Christina of Lorraine
11. Claude of Valois
1. Francesco de' Medici
12. Ferdinand I, Holy Roman Emperor
6. Charles II of Austria
13. Anna of Bohemia and Hungary
3. Maria Magdalena of Austria
14. Albert V, Duke of Bavaria
7. Maria Anna of Bavaria
15. Anna of Austria
