= Claudia Felicitas of Austria =

Holy Roman Empress from 1673 to 1676

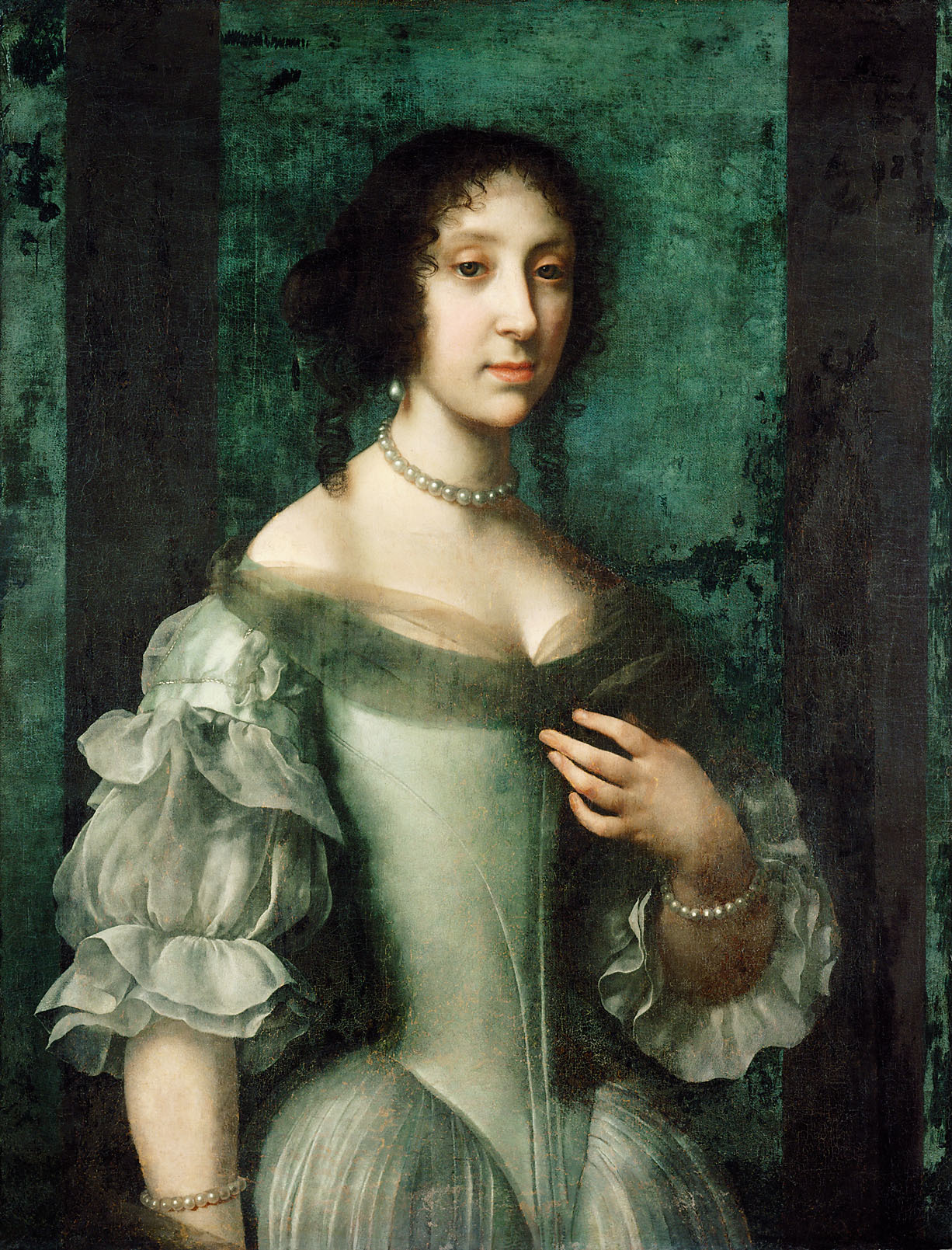
- Portrait by Carlo Dolci, 1672

Holy Roman Empress
- Tenure: 15 October 1673 – 8 April 1676
- Born: 30 May 1653; Innsbruck, County of Tyrol, Holy Roman Empire
- Died: 8 April 1676 (aged 22); Vienna, Archduchy of Austria, Holy Roman Empire
- Burial: Imperial Crypt (heart); Dominican Church (body)
- Spouse: Leopold I, Holy Roman Emperor (m. 1673)
- House: Habsburg
- Father: Ferdinand Charles, Archduke of Austria
- Mother: Anna de' Medici

Claudia Felicitas of Austria (30 May 1653 – 8 April 1676) was by birth an Archduchess of Austria and by marriage Holy Roman Empress, German Queen, Archduchess consort of Austria, Queen consort of Hungary and Bohemia as the second wife of Leopold I.

A member of the Third Order of Saint Dominic, she had a beautiful singing voice and composed music, and also was passionately fond of hunting. Claudia Felicitas had a great influence on her husband; thanks to her, all her political opponents were removed from court. She also struggled with the abuse of the executive and judicial systems. During her 3-year-long marriage, she gave birth to two children who died in infancy; she died after the birth of her second child. The Tyrolean branch of the House of Habsburg became extinct upon her death.

== Life ==
=== Early years ===
Claudia Felicitas was born in Innsbruck on 30 May 1653. She was the first child and eldest daughter of Ferdinand Charles, Archduke of Further Austria and Count of Tyrol, by his wife and first-cousin Anna de' Medici. On her father's side, her grandparents were Leopold V, Archduke of Further Austria and his wife Claudia de' Medici (after which she received her first name); on her mother's side, her grandparents were Cosimo II de' Medici, Grand Duke of Tuscany and his wife Archduchess Maria Maddalena of Austria.

Her parents failed to produce a male heir: after Claudia Felicitas, they had only two other daughters, one who died immediately after birth (19 July 1654) and Maria Magdalena (17 August 1656 – 21 January 1669). After Archduke Ferdinand Charles died in 1662, he was succeeded by his brother Sigismund Francis, who died three years later (1665), a few days after his marriage by proxy with Hedwig of the Palatinate-Sulzbach. In consequence, Claudia Felicitas and her younger sister became the last members of the Tyrolean branch of the House of Habsburg.

Some sources described her as "a very beautiful girl, with a lively character and developed intellect". The princess grew up at court in Innsbruck, which thanks to her parents became one of the centers of European baroque art and music. She had an excellent singing voice, played various instruments and also composed music. However, the great enthusiasm of the princess was hunting; in the preserved portrait by Giovanni Maria Morandi, the 13-year-old Claudia Felicitas was depicted in the image of Diana, the ancient goddess of hunting. However, she didn't forget the customary pious activities, being a secular member of the Third Order of Saint Dominic.

=== Marriage and children ===
After the extinction of the Tyrolean branch of the House of Habsburg in 1665, Further Austria and the County of Tyrol came under the direct control of Emperor Leopold I. Anna de' Medici tried to protect the rights of her daughters. The dispute with the imperial court ended only after the wedding of her eldest daughter with the emperor; after her marriage, Claudia Felicitas retained the title of Countess of Tyrol.

From his first marriage with Infanta Margaret Theresa of Spain, Leopold I had four children (including two sons), but all except the eldest daughter, Archduchess Maria Antonia, died shortly after birth. He was the last of the male Habsburgs, besides the sickly King Charles II of Spain, and thus was in dire need of a male heir; so shortly after his first wife's death (12 March 1673), the emperor (despite his deep mourning) was forced to start looking for a new wife and opted for Claudia Felicitas, his second cousin (both being great-grandchildren of Charles II, Archduke of Inner Austria), who also could bring to him her possible rights over the Tyrol. The princess, with the consent of her relatives, immediately agreed with the proposal, rejecting other suitors of her hand, including the widower James, Duke of York and future King of England and Scotland.

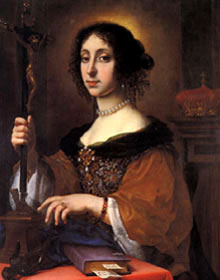
Portrait of Claudia Felicitas by Carlo Dolci, c. 1672-1675

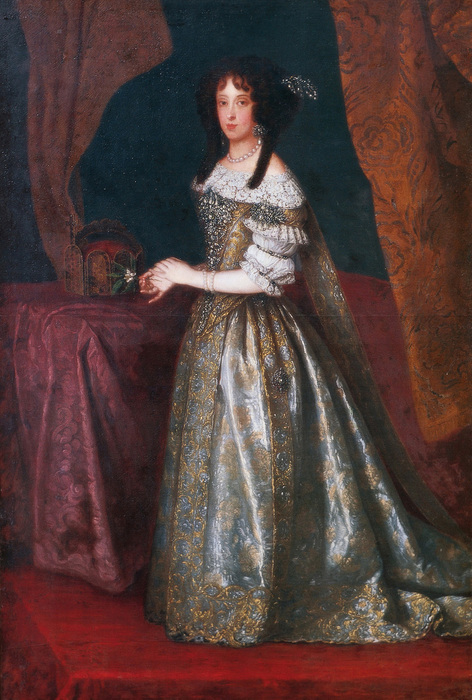
Portrait as Holy Roman Empress, 1673

While praising his prospective bride's youth, attractiveness, and awareness of the great status it implied to be Holy Roman Empress, Leopold I added that she was "not like my only Margareta" in a letter on 12 July 1673, three months before the wedding with Claudia Felicitas took place. He believed she would make a good stepmother to his young daughter Maria Antonia from his first marriage. Indeed, Claudia Felicitas soon enjoyed a close relationship with her stepdaughter.

The proxy marriage took place in Innsbruck, and the bride received a dowry of 30,000 guilders. Then she, with her mother and cortege, traveled to Graz, where the official wedding was scheduled to be celebrated. By command of the emperor, Prince Johann Seyfried von Eggenberg was in charge of the celebrations. Above the main portal in his newly built and magnificent palace, where the day before the wedding, the future empress stopped with her entourage, he ordered to be written the inscription in Latin "Long live Empress Claudia!" (Latin: Ave Claudia Imperatrix). The wedding was held at Graz Cathedral on 15 October 1673, and the celebrations for this event lasted two weeks. On 3 November, the Imperial couple went from Graz to Vienna.

The three-and-a-half-year marriage was said to be very happy, and under Claudia Felicitas the court economy was reportedly at its best. At the time of her first pregnancy in 1674, a poem appeared in Vienna describing the intimate relationship of the imperial couple, written in cross form according to the rules of the "Rösselsprung" puzzle. It is probably the oldest writing of this kind and was very well received. Leopold rewarded the poet with a ducat for each syllable of the poem.

During her marriage, Claudia Felicitas gave birth to two daughters, who died in childhood:

- Anna Maria Josepha Theresia Antonia Dominica Xaveria Dorothea (11 September 1674 – 22 December 1674), Archduchess of Austria.
- Maria Josepha Clementina Anna Gabriella Antonia Franziska Dominica Theresia Eva Placidia (11 October 1675 – 11 July 1676), Archduchess of Austria.

=== Holy Roman Empress and German Queen ===
Despite the failure to produce the needed male heir, Claudia Felicitas enjoyed a happy marriage and had great influence over her husband. She achieved the resignation and exile of the Minister Václav Eusebius František, Prince of Lobkowicz, who was against her marriage with the emperor and favored the choice of Countess Palatine Eleonor Magdalene of Neuburg as Leopold I's new wife when he became a widower; this was also the opinion of Dowager Empress Eleonora Gonzaga (Leopold I's stepmother), and in consequence she and Claudia Felicitas didn't have a good relationship. The empress drew attention to the abuses of her husband and the imperial court, especially in the government and judicial affairs. To this end, in 1674 it supplied the opera with a corresponding implication.

=== Death ===
Claudia Felicitas suddenly died of tuberculosis in Vienna on 8 April 1676, aged 22, after the birth of her second (and only surviving) daughter. She was buried in the Dominican Church, and her heart was put in a special urn and placed in the Imperial Crypt. Three months later, her daughter died, and in September her mother the Dowager Countess of Tyrol also died; she was buried next to her.

Leopold I was very upset by the loss of his second wife. He retired to a monastery near Vienna to mourn his new widowhood, but in December of the same year due to the lack of male heirs he was forced to marry again. The Countess Palatine Eleonore Magdalene of Neuburg bore him ten children including two future Emperors, Joseph I and Charles VI.

== Ancestors ==
Ancestors of Claudia Felicitas of Austria

8. Charles II, Archduke of Austria
4. Leopold V, Archduke of Austria
9. Maria Anna of Bavaria
2. Ferdinand Charles, Archduke of Austria
10. Ferdinando I de' Medici, Grand Duke of Tuscany
5. Claudia de' Medici
11. Christina of Lorraine
1. Claudia Felicitas of Austria
12. Ferdinando I de' Medici, Grand Duke of Tuscany (= 10)
6. Cosimo II de' Medici, Grand Duke of Tuscany
13. Christina of Lorraine (= 11)
3. Anna de' Medici
14. Charles II, Archduke of Austria (= 8)
7. Maria Magdalena of Austria
15. Maria Anna of Bavaria (= 9)

== Sources ==
- Coxe, Guglielmo (1824). Storia della Casa d'Austria da Rodolfo di Apsburgo alla morte di Leopoldo II. Milan., vol. IV., pp. 308–309, 446 p. online
- Czeike, F. (1992). Historisches Lexikon Wien. Vienna: Kremayr und Scheriau. ISBN 978-3-21-800543-2., 623 p. online
- Gottardi, Giacomo (1843). Storia degli Stati dell'Impero d'Austria preceduta da una lezione su la cronologia la geografia e la storia in generale. Brescia: Tipografia Venturini., 314 p. online
- Koldau, Linda Maria (2005). Frauen-Musik-Kultur: ein Handbuch zum deutschen Sprachgebiet der Frühen Neuzeit. London: Böhlau. ISBN 978-3-41-224505-4., 1188 p. online
- Korotin, Ilse (2016). Lexikon österreichischer Frauen. Vienna: Böhlau. ISBN 978-3-20-579590-2., p. 119, 509 – 4248 p. online
- Seel, Heinrich (1817). Geschichte der gefürsteten Grafschaft Tirol. Vienna. online
- Wheatcroft, Andrew (1995). The Habsburgs: Embodying Empire. London: Penguin Books. ISBN 0-670-85490-5.

Claudia Felicitas of Austria House of Habsburg Born: 30 May 1653 Died: 8 April 1676
Royal titles
Vacant Title last held by Margaret Theresa of Spain	Empress of the Holy Roman Empire; Queen consort of Germany; Queen consort of Bohemia and Hungary; Archduchess consort of Austria; 1673–1676	Vacant Title next held by Eleonore Magdalene of Neuburg
