= Giancarlo de' Medici =

Italian cardinal

Giancarlo
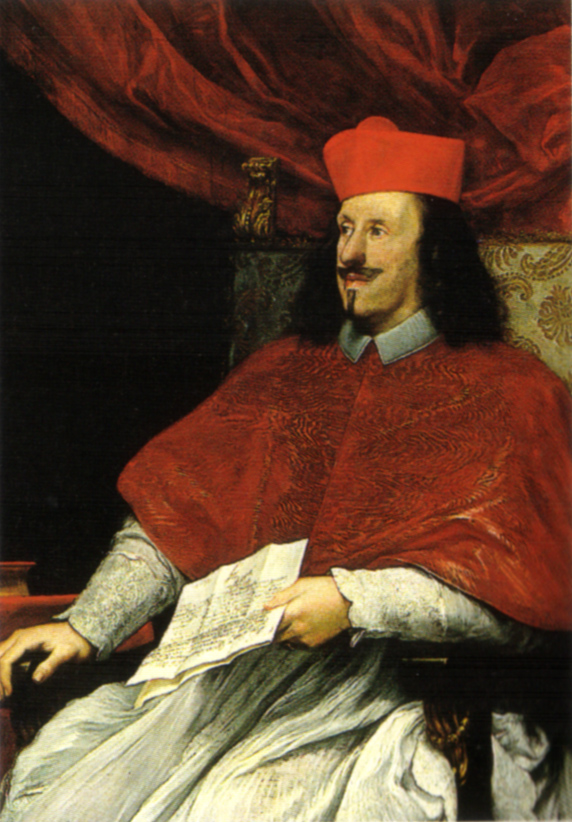
- Giancarlo de' Medici painted by Baldassare Franceschini.
- Born: 24 July 1611; Palazzo Pitti, Florence, Tuscany
- Died: 22 January 1663 (aged 51)
- Burial: The Basilica of San Lorenzo, Florence, Tuscany
- Grand Ducal: House of Medici
- Father: Cosimo II de' Medici, Grand Duke of Tuscany
- Mother: Maria Maddalena of Austria
- Religion: Roman Catholic

Giancarlo de' Medici (24 July 1611 – 22 January 1663) was an Italian cardinal of the House of Medici. He was the second son of Grand Duke Cosimo II of Tuscany and his wife, Maria Maddalena of Austria, and the brother of Ferdinando II de' Medici, Grand Duke of Tuscany.

== Biography ==
He was born at Florence, the second son and third child of Cosimo II de' Medici, Grand Duke of Tuscany and Maria Maddalena of Austria. He entered the ecclesiastical state at a young age. In 1620 he joined the Sovereign Military Order of Malta and was named Grand Prior of Pisa. In 1638 he was named General of the Mediterranean Sea.

On 14 November 1644 Pope Innocent X created Giancarlo a cardinal-deacon as a token of his affection toward the Medici. Thus forced to give up his military career and with it the title of "General of the Spanish Seas", Giancarlo could not reconcile himself to his new "religious" lifestyle.

Cardinal de' Medici participated in the papal conclave, 1655 as one of leaders of the Spanish faction. Pope Alexander VII made Giancarlo responsible for welcoming Queen Christina of Sweden, a new convert to Catholicism, to Rome in 1655. Upon discovering of the closeness that had formed between the two, the Pope sent Gian Carlo back to Florence, declaring him "too handsome and too young" to be "spiritual advisor" to the Queen.

Here, Giancarlo led a life of dissipation, taking many mistresses; nevertheless, Ferdinando II delegated to him the management of the state's financial affairs. After one of his mistresses died, "the sexton who buried her said that Cardinal Gian Carlo, remembering the convulsions of that ivory body, came to look once more; and overcome by so much beauty, entered the vault and lay with her for the last time." He murdered a romantic rival, Cavaliere Luna, but his brother, Duke Ferdinando II, did nothing. He was patron of science, letters and music. He founded the Accademia degli Immobili and contributed to the construction of Teatro della Pergola and the enrichment of the Galleria Palatina di Palazzo Pitti.

In later years, Giancarlo donated his sizeable art collection to form the Pitti Gallery. He died at Florence, of an apoplexy, at the age of 51, and was interred in the Medicean necropolis, the Basilica of San Lorenzo, Florence.

Four years after the death of Giancarlo, his younger brother Leopoldo was created a cardinal.

== Ancestors ==
Ancestors of Giancarlo de' Medici

16. Giovanni dalle Bande Nere
8. Cosimo I de' Medici, Grand Duke of Tuscany
17. Maria Salviati
4. Ferdinando I de' Medici, Grand Duke of Tuscany
18. Pedro Álvarez de Toledo
9. Eleonora di Toledo
19. Maria Osorio Pimentel, Marchioness of Villafranca del Bierzo
2. Cosimo II de' Medici, Grand Duke of Tuscany
20. Francis I, Duke of Lorraine
10. Charles III, Duke of Lorraine
21. Christina of Denmark
5. Christina of Lorraine
22. Henry II of France
11. Claude of Valois
23. Catherine de' Medici
1. Ferdinando II de' Medici, Grand Duke of Tuscany
24. Philip I of Castile
12. Ferdinand I, Holy Roman Emperor
25. Joanna of Castile
6. Charles II of Austria
26. Vladislaus II of Bohemia and Hungary
13. Anna of Bohemia and Hungary
27. Anna of Foix-Candale
3. Maria Magdalena of Austria
28. William IV, Duke of Bavaria
14. Albert V, Duke of Bavaria
29. Marie of Baden-Sponheim
7. Maria Anna of Bavaria
30. Ferdinand I, Holy Roman Emperor (= 12)
15. Anna of Austria
31. Anna of Bohemia and Hungary (= 13)
