= Archduchess Maria Maddalena of Austria =

Grand Duchess of Tuscany from 1609 to 1621

Maria Maddalena of Austria
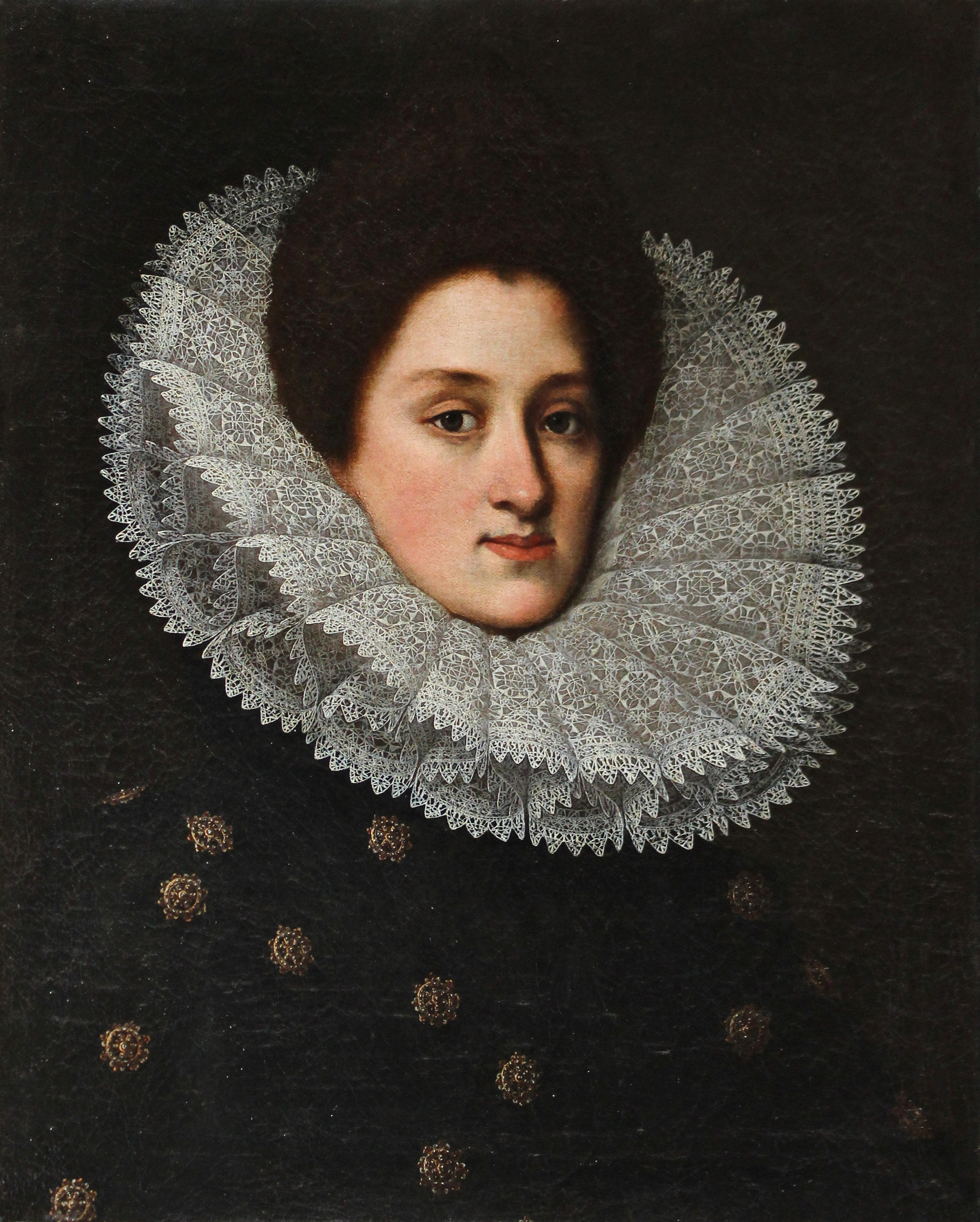
- Portrait by Cristofano Allori, c. 1610

Grand Duchess consort of Tuscany
- Tenure: 17 February 1609 – 28 February 1621
- Born: 7 October 1589; Graz, Duchy of Styria, Holy Roman Empire
- Died: 1 November 1631 (aged 42); Passau, Prince-Bishopric of Passau, Holy Roman Empire
- Spouse: Cosimo II de' Medici, Grand Duke of Tuscany (m. 1608; died 1621)
- Issue: See: Maria Cristina; Ferdinando II, Grand Duke of Tuscany; Cardinal Gian Carlo; Margherita, Duchess of Parma; Mattias, Governor of Siena; Prince Francesco; Anna, Archduchess of Austria; Leopold, Governor of Siena
Names
- German: Maria Magdalena; Italian: Maria Maddalena
- House: Habsburg
- Father: Charles II, Archduke of Austria
- Mother: Maria Anna of Bavaria

Maria Maddalena of Austria (German: Maria Magdalena von Österreich, Italian: Maria Maddalena d'Austria; 7 October 1589 – 1 November 1631) was Grand Duchess of Tuscany by her marriage to Cosimo II in 1609 until his death in 1621. With him, she had eight children, including a duchess of Parma, a grand duke of Tuscany, and an archduchess of Further Austria. Born in Graz, Maria Magdalena was the youngest daughter of Charles II, Archduke of Inner Austria, and his wife Maria Anna of Bavaria. During the minority of her son, Grand Duke Ferdinando, she and her mother-in-law acted as regents from 1621 to 1628. She died on 1 November 1631 in Passau.

== Grand Duchess consort of Tuscany ==
In 1608, the 19-year-old Maria Magdalena was married to Cosimo de' Medici, Grand Prince of Tuscany. Cosimo's father, Ferdinando I de' Medici, Grand Duke of Tuscany, arranged the marriage in order to assuage Spain's (where Maria Magdalena's sister was the incumbent queen) animosity towards Tuscany, which had been inflamed due to a string of Franco-Tuscan marriages. From then on, she was known as Maria Maddalena, the Italian form of her name.

== Regency ==
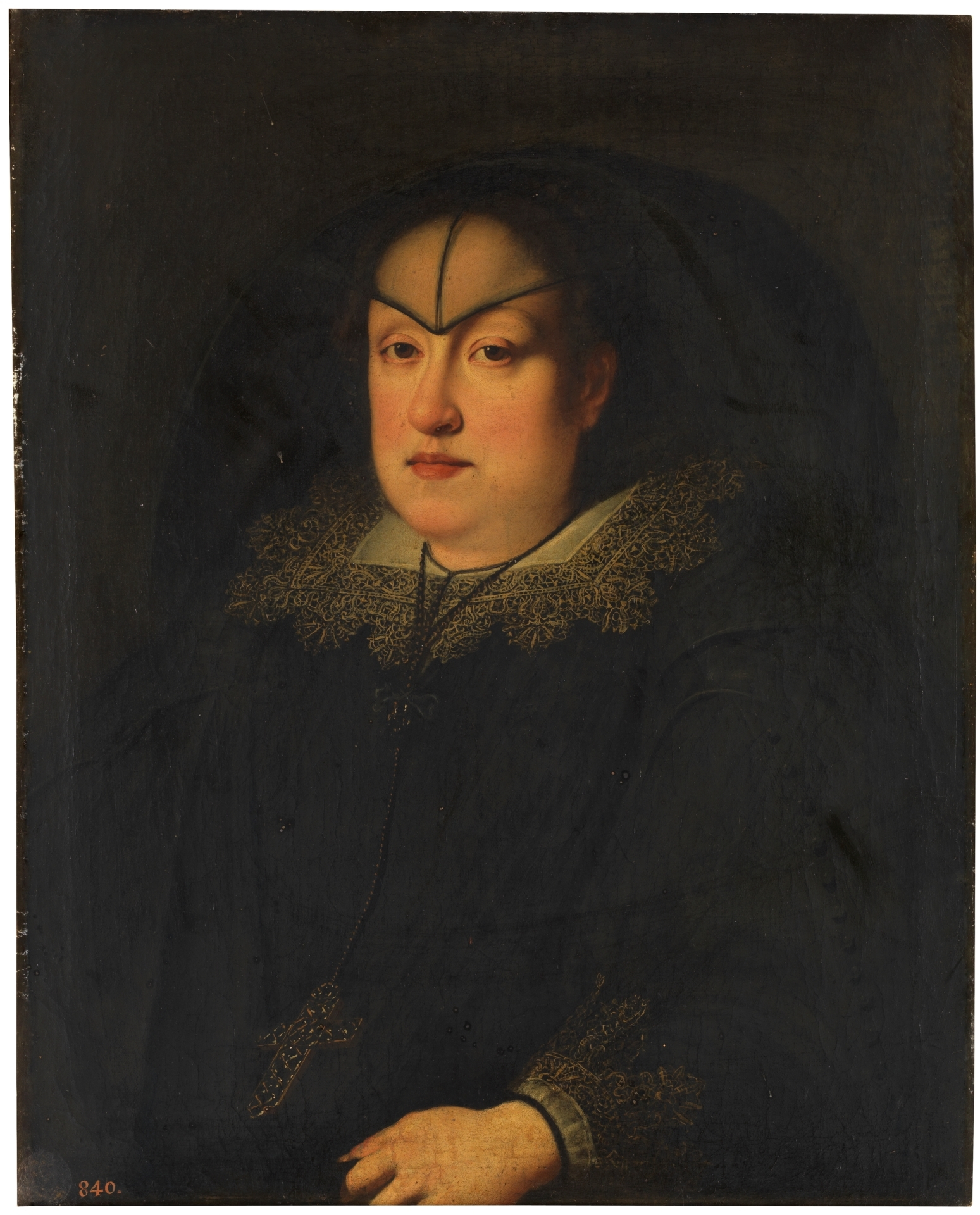
Maria Maddalena as a widow, by Sustermans, c. 1627

She and Cosimo enjoyed a contented marriage. Together they had eight children in just eight years. Cosimo II died in 1621, leaving their ten-year-old son Ferdinando as grand duke. Cosimo's last will dictated that the two Grand Duchesses – his mother Christina and Maria Maddalena – would rule as joint regents, with the assistance of a council of four ministers. Their collective regency is known as the Tutrici. Maria Maddalena's temperament was analogous to Christina's. Together, they aligned Tuscany with the Papacy; re-doubled the Tuscan clergy; and allowed the trial of Galileo Galilei to occur. Upon the death of the last Duke of Urbino, instead of claiming the duchy for Ferdinando, who was married to the Duke's granddaughter, and heiress, Vittoria della Rovere, they permitted it to be annexed by Pope Urban VIII.

In 1626, they banned any Tuscan subject from being educated outside the grand duchy, a law later resurrected by Maria Maddalena's grandson, Cosimo III. The Dowager grand duchesses sent Ferdinando on a tour of Europe in 1627.

Harold Acton ascribes the decline of Tuscany to their regency. It is also asserted about the dowager duchesses, that,

Both were excellent women, but they were without any talent for governing; they were still less endowed with the smallest financial ability; they were excessively fond of pomp and splendor. Never before had such gorgeous magnificence been displayed by the court as now ensued by their rule.

The Grand Duchess died aged 42 after a visit to her brother Leopold in Innsbruck on the way back to Passau. Her son had been in power for a year.

== Issue ==
1. Maria Cristina de' Medici (August 24, 1609 – August 9, 1632), born deformed or mentally disabled
2. Ferdinando II de' Medici, Grand Duke of Tuscany (July 14, 1610 – May 23, 1670) married Vittoria della Rovere.
3. Gian Carlo de' Medici (July 24, 1611 – January 23, 1663) made Cardinal in 1644.
4. Margherita de' Medici (May 31, 1612 – February 6, 1679) married Odoardo Farnese, Duke of Parma.
5. Mattias de' Medici (May 9, 1613 – October 14, 1667) appointed Governor of Siena.
6. Francesco de' Medici (October 16, 1614 – July 25, 1634).
7. Anna de' Medici (July 21, 1616 – September 11, 1676) married Ferdinand Charles, Archduke of Austria (1628–1662)
8. Leopoldo de' Medici (November 6, 1617 – November 10, 1675), made Cardinal in 1667.

== Ancestors ==
Ancestors of Archduchess Maria Maddalena of Austria

16. Maximilian I, Holy Roman Emperor
8. Philip I of Castile (= 28)
17. Mary of Burgundy
4. Ferdinand I, Holy Roman Emperor (=14)
18. Ferdinand II of Aragon
9. Joanna of Castile (= 29)
19. Isabella I of Castile
2. Charles II of Austria
20. Casimir IV Jagiellon
10. Vladislas II of Bohemia and Hungary (= 30)
21. Elisabeth of Austria
5. Anna of Bohemia and Hungary (=15)
22. Gaston de Foix, Count of Candale
11. Anna of Foix-Candale (= 31)
23. Catherine of Foix
1. Maria Maddalena of Austria
24. Albert IV, Duke of Bavaria
12. William IV, Duke of Bavaria
25. Kunigunde of Austria
6. Albert V, Duke of Bavaria
26. Philip I, Margrave of Baden
13. Marie of Baden-Sponheim
27. Elisabeth of the Palatinate
3. Maria Anna of Bavaria
28. Philip I of Castile (= 8)
14. Ferdinand I, Holy Roman Emperor (= 4)
29. Joanna of Castile (= 9)
7. Anna of Austria
30. Vladislas II of Bohemia and Hungary (= 10)
15. Anna of Bohemia and Hungary (= 5)
31. Anna of Foix-Candale (= 11)

== Bibliography ==
- Acton, Harold: The Last Medici, Macmillan, London, 1980, ISBN 0-333-29315-0
- Strathern, Paul: The Medici: Godfathers of the Renaissance, Vintage books, London, 2003, ISBN 978-0-09-952297-3
- Hale, J.R.: Florence and the Medici, Orion books, London, 1977, ISBN 1-84212-456-0
- Young, G.F. (1920). The Medici. Vol. II. John Murray. ISBN 9780898754186.

Archduchess Maria Maddalena of Austria House of Habsburg Born: 7 October 1589 Died: 1 November 1631
Italian royalty
Preceded by Christina of Lorraine	Grand Ducal consort of Tuscany; 1609–1621	Vacant Title next held by Vittoria della Rovere
