= Francesco de' Medici =

Francesco de' Medici may refer to:

- Francesco I de' Medici (1541–1587), Grand Duke of Tuscany
- Francesco di Ferdinando de' Medici (1594–1614)
- Francesco de' Medici (1614–1634)
- Francesco Maria de' Medici (1660–1711)
