= Allegory of Hercules =

Painting by Dosso Dossi

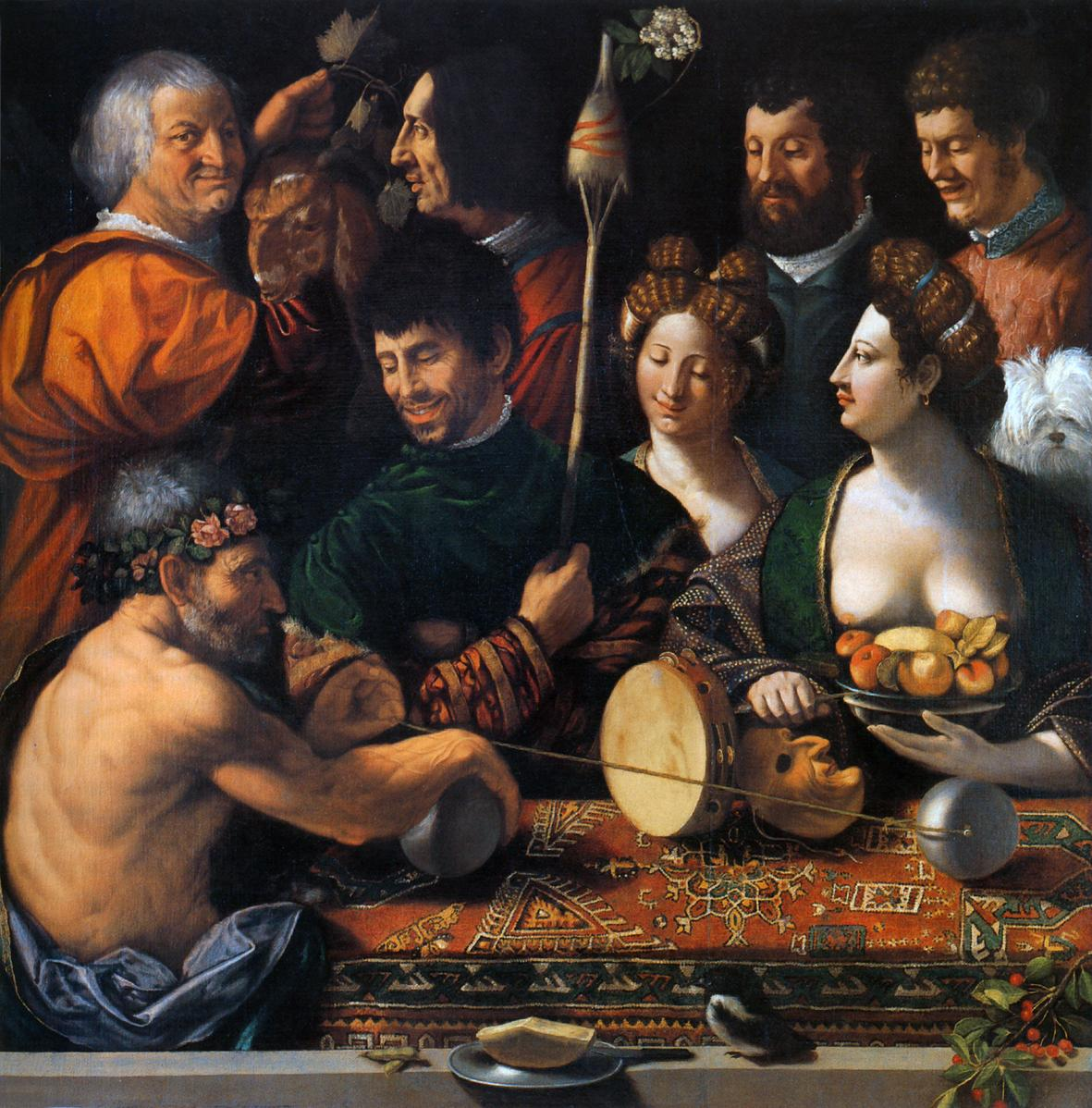
Allegory of Hercules (c. 1535) by Dosso Dossi

Allegory of Hercules (also known as Witchcraft) is an oil painting on canvas executed c. 1535 by the Italian Renaissance painter Dosso Dossi, now in the Uffizi in Florence. Its subject is uncertain and its sometimes almost known as Bambocciata or Stregoneria.

It was acquired in Siena by Giannotto Cennini for cardinal Leopoldo de' Medici, who received it in 1665. His inventory called it a "painting with portraits of the jesters of the dukes of Ferrara", a satirical caricature subject which can only have originated as a direct commission from Ercole II d'Este, himself named after Hercules, hence the painting's name.
