= Biener =

Biener is a surname. Notable people with the surname include:

- Wilhelm Biener (1590–1651), chancellor of Tyrol
- John Byner (John Biener, born 1938), American comedian
