= Holy Family (Signorelli) =

C. 1490 painting by Luca Signorelli

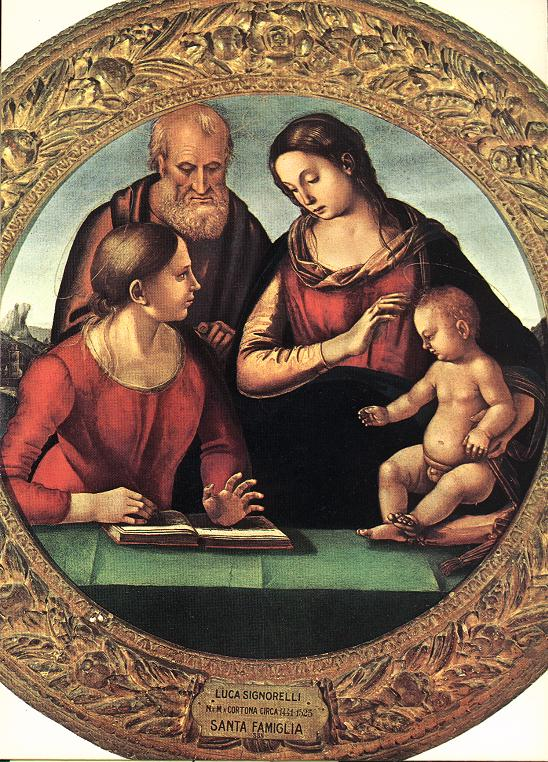
Holy Family (c. 1490–1495) by Luca Signorelli

Holy Family or Holy Family with a Female Saint is a tempera on panel painting by Luca Signorelli, created c. 1490–1495, now in the Galleria Palatina in Florence.

Its commissioner and original location are both unknown, as is the date on which it entered the Medici collection, though it may have been one of the first works Mattias de' Medici sent from Siena in 1630. It was attributed to Signorelli in 1879 and this has not been disputed since, although questions have been raised as to how much of it is by Signorelli's assistants - Olsen argues it is entirely a studio work. Questions still also remain as to its dating - Berenson, Cruttwell, Mario Salmi and Scarpellini place it during Signorelli's time in Florence between 1490 and 1495, linking it to his other tondos, whilst Vischer places it in the 16th century and Henry (in Kanter-Testa 2001) argues it is an entirely autograph work from 1491 or 1492 during the artist's time in Volterra.
