= Mattias de' Medici =

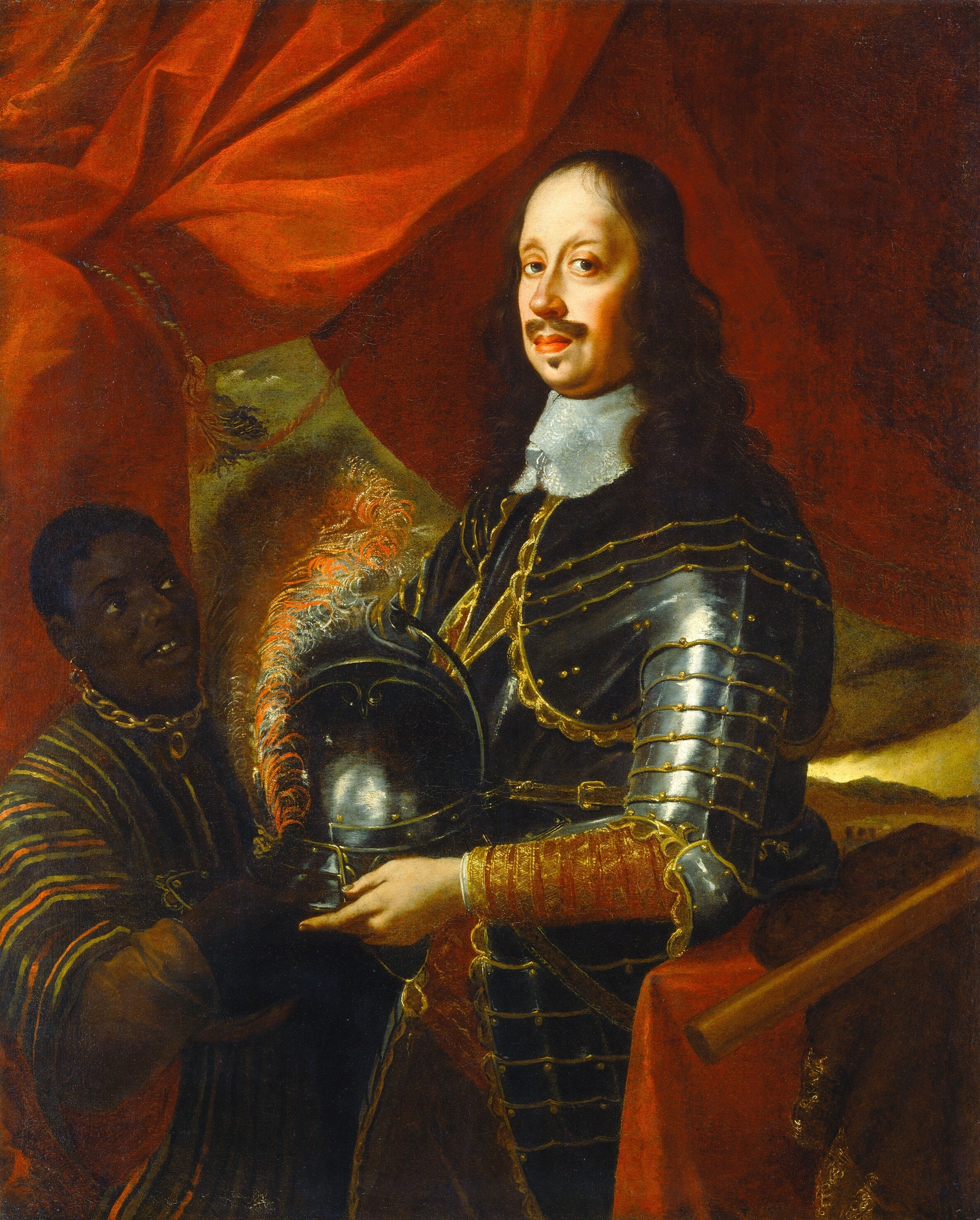
- Portrait by Justus Sustermans, c. 1660

Governor of Siena
- Predecessor: Leopoldo de' Medici
- Successor: Francesco Maria de' Medici
- Born: 9 May 1613; Florence, Tuscany
- Died: 11 October 1667 (aged 54); Siena, Tuscany
- Burial: The Basilica of San Lorenzo
- House: Medici
- Father: Cosimo II de' Medici, Grand Duke of Tuscany
- Mother: Maria Maddalena of Austria
- Religion: Roman Catholicism

Mattias de' Medici (9 May 1613 – 11 October 1667) was the third son of Grand Duke Cosimo II de' Medici of Tuscany and Archduchess Maria Maddalena of Austria. He was governor of Siena, with interruptions, from 1629. He never married.

== Biography ==
Mattias pursued an ecclesiastical career, like his brother Gian Carlo, but found it was not to his liking. Instead, he embarked on a military career at the age of 16. His father, Cosimo II, died on 28 February 1621; he was succeeded by Ferdinando de' Medici, the elder son. On 29 May 1629, Grand Duke Ferdinando appointed Mattias governor of Siena, following the death of their aunt and the then governor, Caterina de' Medici.

He arrived in his domain on 27 August and took up residence in the Piazza del Duomo. Spending the bulk of his time in Siena, he was immensely popular among the Sienese. In 1631, he joined the Austrian belligerency in the Thirty Years' War. He took part in the famous battle of Lützen, in November 1632, where he met Sienese General Ottavio Piccolomini.

Upon his return to the grand duchy in 1641, he resumed the reins of Sienese government. He did not stay long, nevertheless, as the Wars of Castro broke out. Ferdinando II vested in him supreme authority over the grand duchy's military affairs, and thus he commanded the league of the Republic of Venice, the Grand Duchy of Tuscany, the Duchy of Parma and the Duchy of Modena and Reggio against the Barberini Pope, entrusting the government of Siena to his brother Cardinal Leopoldo de' Medici for the duration of his absence.

Mattias adored the arts, patronising Justus Sustermans, Volterrano and many other eminent artists. He also loved horse races and was particularly enthusiast of the famous Palio, which he promoted during its early history. While in Germany, he acquired scientific instruments, such as dials, astrolabes and compasses; all of which he later deposited in the Uffizi.

In later life, suffering from gout, he pondered re-assuming ecclesiastical garb; however, he fell ill and died in Siena on 11 October 1667 at 54 years of age. He was buried in the Medici tombs in San Lorenzo, Florence.

== Ancestors ==
Ancestors of Mattias de' Medici

16. Giovanni dalle Bande Nere
8. Cosimo I de' Medici, Grand Duke of Tuscany
17. Maria Salviati
4. Ferdinando I de' Medici, Grand Duke of Tuscany
18. Pedro Álvarez de Toledo
9. Eleonora di Toledo
19. Maria Osorio Pimentel, Marchioness of Villafranca del Bierzo
2. Cosimo II de' Medici, Grand Duke of Tuscany
20. Francis I, Duke of Lorraine
10. Charles III, Duke of Lorraine
21. Christina of Denmark
5. Christina of Lorraine
22. Henry II of France
11. Claude of Valois
23. Catherine de' Medici
1. Mattias de' Medici
24. Philip I of Castile
12. Ferdinand I, Holy Roman Emperor
25. Joanna of Castile
6. Charles II of Austria
26. Vladislaus II of Bohemia and Hungary
13. Anna of Bohemia and Hungary
27. Anna of Foix-Candale
3. Maria Magdalena of Austria
28. William IV, Duke of Bavaria
14. Albert V, Duke of Bavaria
29. Marie of Baden-Sponheim
7. Maria Anna of Bavaria
30. Ferdinand I, Holy Roman Emperor (= 12)
15. Anna of Austria
31. Anna of Bohemia and Hungary (= 13)

Mattias de' Medici House of Medici Born: 9 May 1613 Died: 11 October 1667
Political offices
Preceded by Caterina de' Medici	Governor of Siena; 1629-1636	Succeeded by Leopoldo de' Medici
Preceded by Leopoldo de' Medici	Governor of Siena; 1641-1643	Succeeded by Leopoldo de' Medici
Preceded by Leopoldo de' Medici	Governor of Siena; 1644-1667	Succeeded by Francesco Maria de' Medici
