= Ferdinand of Austria =

Ferdinand of Austria may refer to:

- Ferdinand I, Holy Roman Emperor (1503 – 1564), Archduke of Austria
- Ferdinand II, Archduke of Austria (1529 – 1595), son of Ferdinand I, Holy Roman Emperor
- Ferdinand II, Holy Roman Emperor (1578 – 1637), a.k.a. Ferdinand III, Archduke of Inner Austria
- Ferdinand III, Holy Roman Emperor (1608 – 1657), Archduke of Austria, son of Ferdinand II, Holy Roman Emperor
- Cardinal-Infante Ferdinand (1609/1610–1641)
- Ferdinand Charles, Archduke of Austria (1628 – 1662)
- Ferdinand I of Austria (1793 – 1875)

== See also ==
- Ferdinand of Habsburg (disambiguation)
