= Wilhelm Biener =

Austrian lawyer and politician (1590–1651)

Wilhelm Biener (Bienner) (1590 – 17 July 1651) was a lawyer, and chancellor of Tyrol.

Born in Lauchheim in what is now Baden-Württemberg, he was employed by Margrave Karl von Burgau from 1620 onwards. After having served under the Elector of Bavaria, Maximilian I from 1625 to 1630, he was appointed by Emperor Ferdinand II to be a judge at the Imperial Court. He was assigned to Archduke Leopold V of Tyrol, initially in an advisory function, but in 1638 he became court chancellor, a function he was to hold until 1650, first under Archduchess Claudia de' Medici and, after her death in 1648, under her son, Archduke Ferdinand Charles.

== Work as Chancellor ==
On behalf of the Archduchess Claudia de' Medici, Biener administered the collection of revenues. He became unpopular in this occupation, particularly after exchanging heated correspondence with the Bishop of Brixen over taxes the Bishop believed the principality was exempt from paying.

Wilhelm Biener tightened the administration, and fought against corruption and official malpractice. He prevented the secession of the ecclesiastical principalities Brixen and Trento by enforcing their contractual ties to Tyrol so that, as a consequence, these territories remained under the authority of the Tyrol.

Through careful diplomacy, he also prevented a French invasion of the Münstertal in Switzerland and settled disagreements with Graubünden farmers, who were nominally still subject to Tyrol but in fact already were independent.

Resisted by the States, Wilhelm Biener strengthened the power of the sovereign. In vain, he protested against the selling of Tyrolian rights to Graubünden. These rights were sold in order to finance the extravagant life style of Archduke Ferdinand Charles. Thus, the Prättigau and the Lower Engadin were incorporated into Graubünden.

== Trial and execution ==
In 1650, Wilhelm Biener, following the death of the Archduchess, was charged with treason and embezzlement. He was tried by two Italian judges and was sentenced to death in 1651. After the sentence was given, Biener wrote to Archduke Ferdinand, the son of the former Empress, who ordered a reprieve. However Biener was executed in 1651 in the town of Rattenberg as the official pardon was delivered too late.

== Cultural references ==
Playwright Josef Wenter used the struggle between Wilhelm Biener and the aristocracy as a reflection of Austrian culture and policy in the 1930s. Author Robert Pyrah has suggested the play, Der Kanzler von Tirol, was popular despite its contentious political material due to the tragic romance developed between Biener and Archduchess consort of Austria Claudia de'Medici.

Dr Hermann von Schmid wrote his novel The Chancellor of Tyrol on Wilhelm Biener. It has been suggested that this book contributed to the perception of Biener as hero.

It has also been suggested that Biener was the basis for the character of Vilem in Karel Mácha's poem, Máj.
