= Ferdinand Charles, Archduke of Austria =

Archduke of Further Austria

Ferdinand Charles
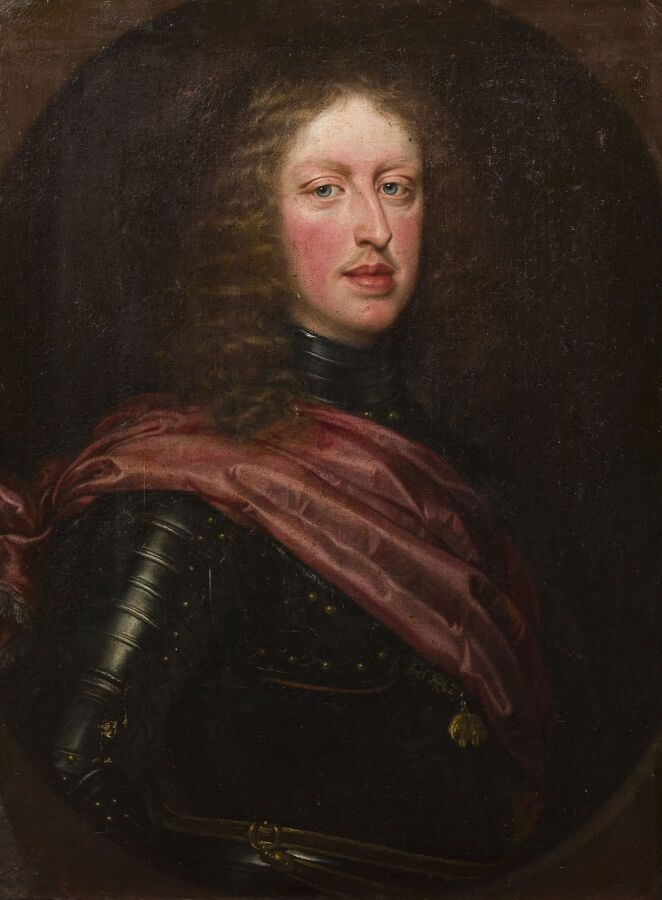
- Portrait from the workshop of Sustermans

Archduke of Further Austria
- Reign: 13 September 1632 – 30 December 1662
- Predecessor: Leopold V
- Successor: Sigismund Francis
- Regent: Claudia de' Medici (1632-1646)
- Born: 17 May 1628; Archduchy of Austria, Holy Roman Empire
- Died: 30 December 1662 (aged 34); Kaltern, County of Tyrol, Holy Roman Empire
- Spouse: Anna de' Medici (m. 1646)
- Issue: Claudia Felicitas, Holy Roman Empress
- House: Habsburg
- Father: Leopold V, Archduke of Austria
- Mother: Claudia de' Medici
- Religion: Roman Catholicism

Ferdinand Charles (17 May 1628 – 30 December 1662) was the Archduke of Further Austria, including Tyrol, from 1632 to 1662. He was the firstborn son of Archduke Leopold V of Further Austria and Claudia de' Medici. Until 1646, his mother Claudia served as regent and de facto ruler. Ferdinand Charles was a patron of the arts with Italian opera performed at his court. Despite this, he was a poor ruler and lived an extravagant lifestyle, drained the treasury, and held illegal executions.

Aged eighteen, Ferdinand Charles married his cousin, the thirty year old Anna de' Medici. They had no sons, and the male line of his father died out soon after Ferdinand Charles' own death, aged thirty-four, of smallpox. His daughter Claudia Felicitas of Austria-Tyrol went on to marry Holy Roman Emperor Leopold I.

== Rule ==
As the son of Archduke Leopold V and Claudia de' Medici, he succeeded his father upon the latter's death in 1632, under his mother's regency. He took over his mother's gubernatorial duties when he came of age in 1646. To finance his extravagant living style, he sold goods and entitlements. For example, he wasted the exorbitant sum which France had to pay to the Tyrolean Habsburgs for the cession of their fiefs west of the Rhine (Alsace, Sundgau and Breisach). He also fixed the border to Graubünden in 1652.

Ferdinand Charles was an absolutist ruler, did not call any diet after 1648 and had his chancellor Wilhelm Biener executed illegally in 1651 after a secret trial. On the other hand, he was a lover of music and patron of arts: Italian opera was performed in his court.

He died in Kaltern of smallpox, at the age of thirty-four, and was succeeded by his younger brother, Sigismund Francis.

== Marriage and children ==
Ferdinand Charles married Anna de' Medici. She was a daughter of Cosimo II de' Medici, Grand Duke of Tuscany and Maria Magdalena of Austria. They had three children:

- Claudia Felicitas of Austria (30 May 1653 – 8 April 1676). Married Leopold I, Holy Roman Emperor.
- Daughter (born and died 19 July 1654), died at birth.
- Maria Magdalena of Austria (17 August 1656 – 21 January 1669).
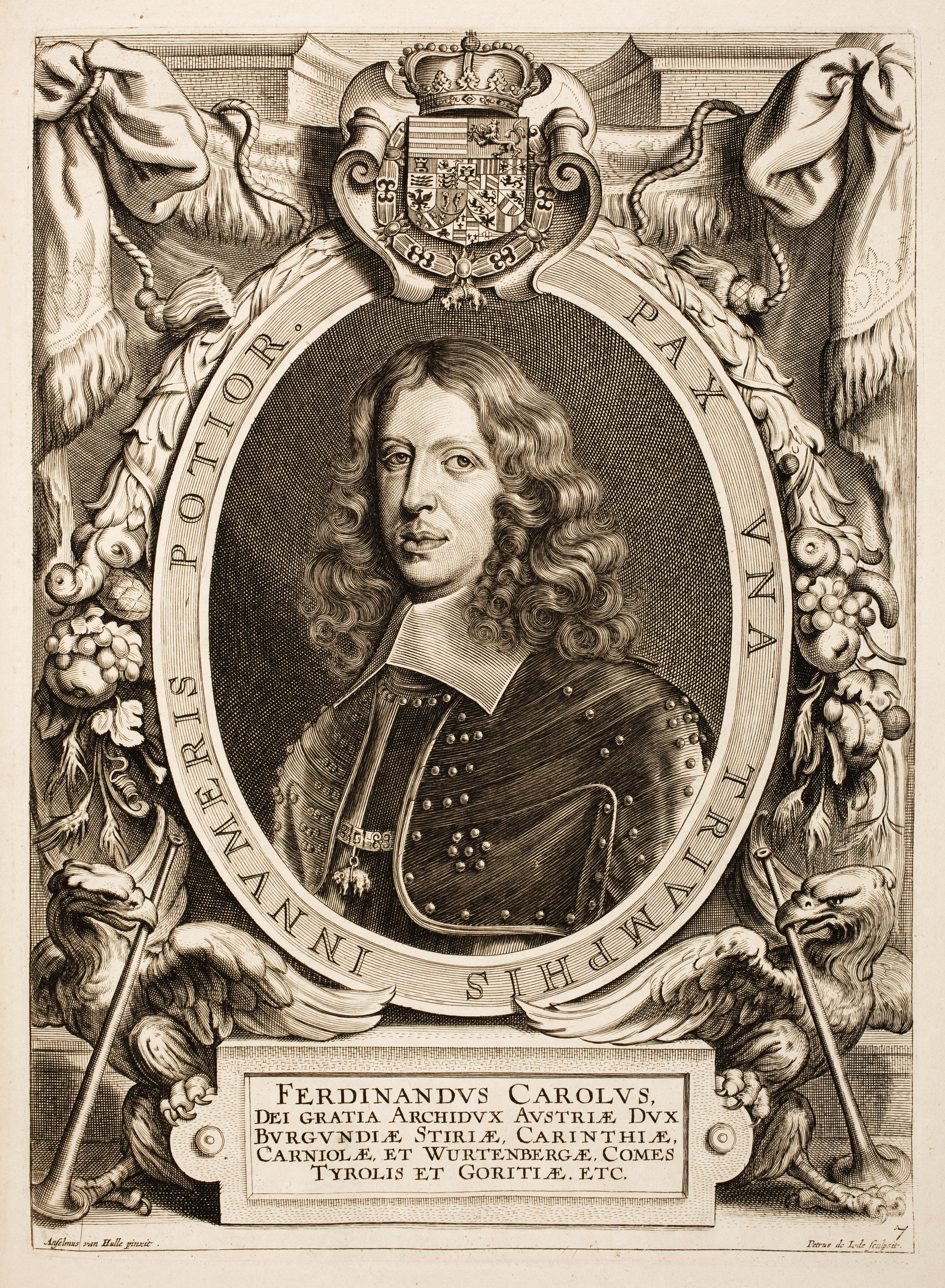
Bust portrait of Ferdinand Charles, after a painting by Anselm van Hulle. Collection Peace Palace Library.

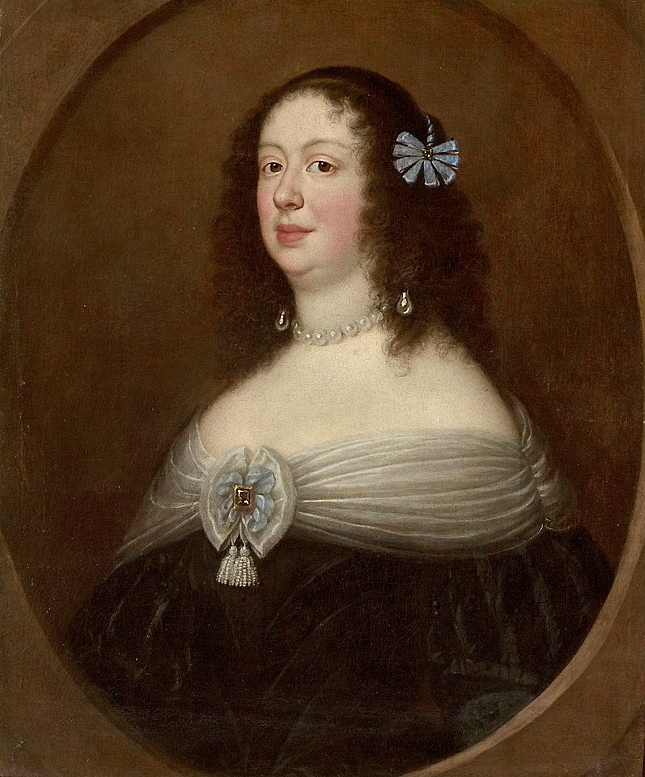
Anna de' Medici, his wife, by a follower of Justus Sustermans.

== Ancestors ==
Ancestors of Ferdinand Charles, Archduke of Austria

8. Ferdinand I, Holy Roman Emperor (= 22)
4. Charles II, Archduke of Austria
9. Anna of Bohemia and Hungary (= 23)
2. Leopold V, Archduke of Austria
10. Albert V, Duke of Bavaria
5. Maria Anna of Bavaria
11. Anna of Austria
1. Ferdinand Charles, Archduke of Austria
12. Cosimo I de' Medici, Grand Duke of Tuscany
6. Ferdinando I de' Medici, Grand Duke of Tuscany
13. Eleanor de Toledo
3. Claudia de' Medici
14. Charles III, Duke of Lorraine
7. Christina of Lorraine
15. Claude of Valois

== Male-line family tree ==
House of Habsburg

Original line
Albert; Count of Habsburg c. 1188–1239
Rudolf I of Germany c. 1218–1291
Albert I of Germany; 1255–1308 | Hartmann; 1263–1281 | Rudolf II; Duke of Austria; 1270–1290
Rudolf I of Bohemia; 1281–1307 | Frederick the Fair c. 1289–1330 | Leopold I Duke of Austria; 1290–1326 | Albert II; Duke of Austria; 1298–1358 | Henry the Friendly; 1299–1327 | Otto; Duke of Austria; 1301–1339 | John; Parricida c. 1290–1312/1313
Albertinian line | Leopoldian line
Rudolf IV; Duke of Austria; 1339–1365 | Frederick III; 1347–1362 | Albert III; Duke of Austria; 1349–1395 | Leopold III; Duke of Austria; 1351–1386 | Frederick II; Duke of Austria; 1327–1344 | Leopold II; Duke of Austria; 1328–1344
Albert IV; Duke of Austria; 1377–1404 | William; Duke of Austria c. 1370–1406 | Leopold IV; Duke of Austria; 1371–1411 | Ernest; Duke of Austria; 1377–1424 | Frederick IV; Duke of Austria; 1382–1439
Albert II of Germany; 1397–1439 | Frederick III; HRE; 1415–1493 | Albert VI; Archduke of Austria; 1418–1463 | Sigismund; Archduke of Austria; 1427–1496
Ladislaus the Posthumous; 1440–1457 | Maximilian I HRE; 1459–1519
Philip I of Castile; 1478–1506
Spanish / Iberian line | Austrian / HRE line
Charles V HRE; 1500–1558 | Ferdinand I HRE; 1503–1564
Philip II of Spain; 1527–1598 | Maximilian II; HRE; 1527–1576 | Ferdinand II; Archduke of Austria; 1529–1595 | Charles II; Archduke of Austria; 1540–1590
Carlos; Prince of Asturias; 1545–1568 | Philip III of Spain; 1578–1621 | Rudolf II; HRE; 1552–1612 | Ernest of Austria; 1553–1595 | Matthias; HRE; 1557–1619 | Maximilian III; Archduke of Austria; 1558–1618 | Albert VII; Archduke of Austria; 1559–1621 | Wenceslaus; Archduke of Austria; 1561–1578 | Andrew; Margrave of Burgau; 1558–1600 | Charles; Margrave of Burgau; 1560–1618 | Ferdinand II; HRE; 1578–1637 | Maximilian Ernest of Austria; 1583–1616 | Leopold V Archduke of Austria; 1586–1632 | Charles of Austria; 1590–1624
Philip IV of Spain; 1605–1665 | Charles of Austria; 1607–1632 | Ferdinand of Austria; 1609–1641 | John-Charles of Austria; 1605–1619 | Ferdinand III; HRE; 1608–1657 | Leopold Wilhelm of Austria; 1614–1662 | Ferdinand Charles; Archduke of Austria; 1628–1662 | Sigismund Francis; Archduke of Austria; 1630–1665
Balthasar Charles; Prince of Asturias; 1629–1646 | Charles II of Spain; 1661–1700 | Ferdinand IV; King of the Romans; 1633–1654 | Leopold I HRE; 1640–1705 | Charles Joseph of Austria; 1649–1664
Joseph I HRE; 1678–1711 | Charles VI; HRE; 1685–1740
Lorraine
Maria Theresa; HRE; 1740–1780 | Francis I HRE; 1745–1765
Habsburg-Lorraine
Joseph II; HRE; 1765–1790 | Leopold II; HRE; 1790–1792
Francis II; HRE; 1792–1806

Notes:

Regnal titles
| Preceded by Leopold V | Archduke of Further Austria; 1632–1662 | Succeeded by Sigismund Francis |
