= Ferdinand of Habsburg =

Ferdinand of Habsburg or Ferdinand Habsburg may refer to:

- Ferdinand I, Holy Roman Emperor (1503–1564)
- Ferdinand II, Holy Roman Emperor (1578–1637)
- Ferdinand III, Holy Roman Emperor (1608–1657)
- Ferdinand I of Austria (1793–1875)
- Ferdinand Habsburg (racing driver) (born 1997)

== See also ==
- Ferdinand of Austria (disambiguation)
