= Anna de' Medici, Archduchess of Austria =

Anna de' Medici
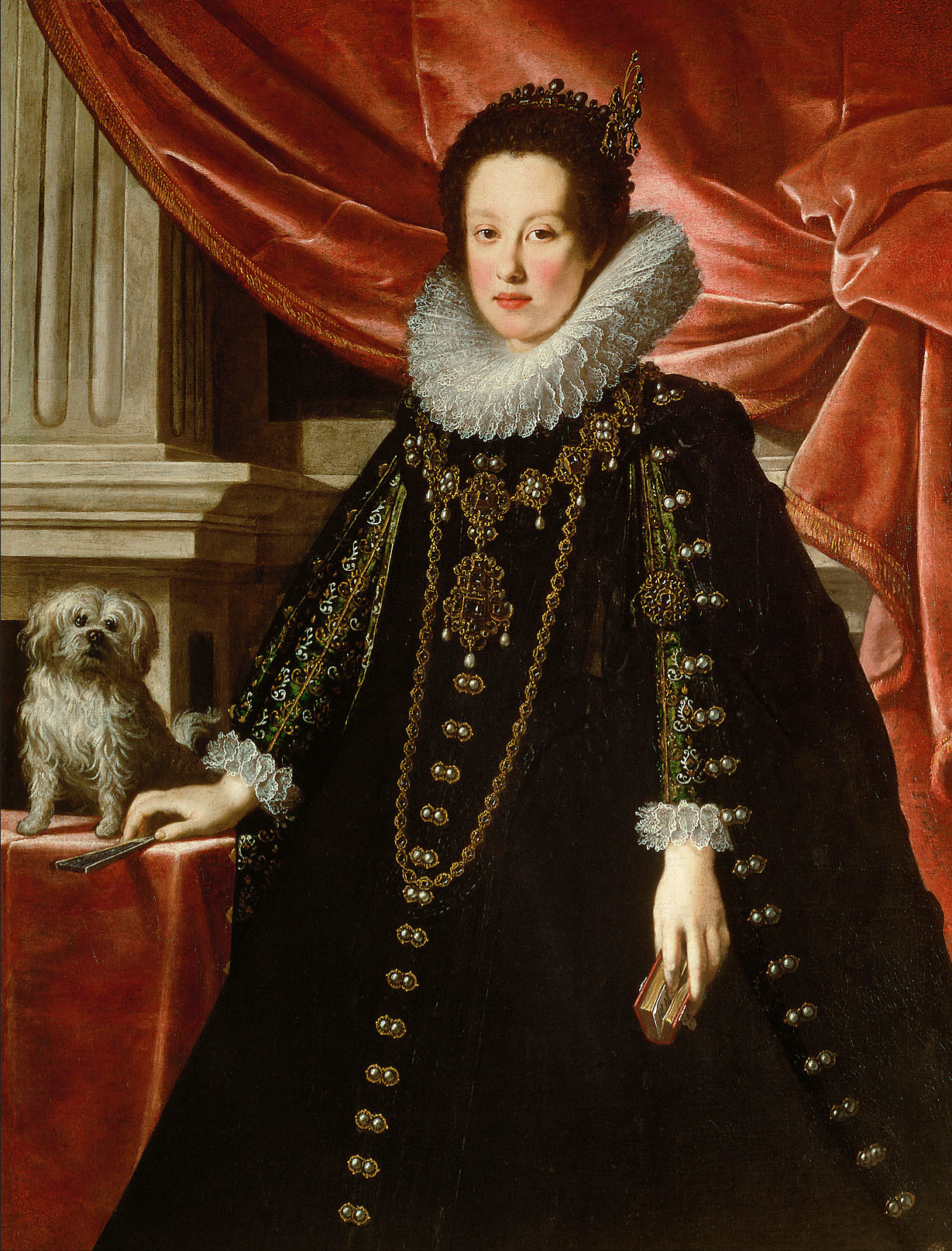
- Portrait by Justus Sustermans, c. 1630

Archduchess consort of Further Austria
- Tenure: 10 June 1646 – 30 December 1662
- Born: 21 July 1616; Palazzo Pitti, Florence, Grand Duchy of Tuscany
- Died: 11 September 1676 (aged 60); Vienna, Archduchy of Austria, Holy Roman Empire
- Spouse: Ferdinand Charles, Archduke of Further Austria (m. 1646; died 1662)
- Issue: Claudia Felicitas, Holy Roman Empress; Archduchess Maria Magdalena
Names
- Anna de' Medici
- House: Medici
- Father: Cosimo II de' Medici, Grand Duke of Tuscany
- Mother: Maria Maddalena of Austria

Anna de' Medici (21 July 1616 – 11 September 1676) was a daughter of Cosimo II de' Medici, Grand Duke of Tuscany and his wife Maria Maddalena of Austria. A patron of the arts, she married Ferdinand Charles, Archduke of Further Austria in 1646. They were the parents of Claudia Felicitas of Austria, Holy Roman Empress.

== Biography ==
=== Early life ===
Princess Anna was born on 21 July 1616 at the Palazzo Pitti in Florence, the capital of the Grand Duchy of Tuscany. Her father was Cosimo II de' Medici, he had been the reigning Grand Duke of Tuscany since 1609. Anna's mother was Maria Maddalena of Austria, a daughter of Charles II, Archduke of Austria, and a sister of Ferdinand II, Holy Roman Emperor. Her Medici and Habsburg ancestry was a common pairing among seventeenth century marriages in her family; indeed, she herself would come to marry a Habsburg, as would her daughter.

Her father died on 28 February 1621, causing her mother and grandmother Grand Duchess Christina to serve as regents until the majority of Anna's brother was reached. It was said that Anna and her sister Margherita inherited from Maria Maddalena her good qualities and marked abilities.

=== Marriage ===
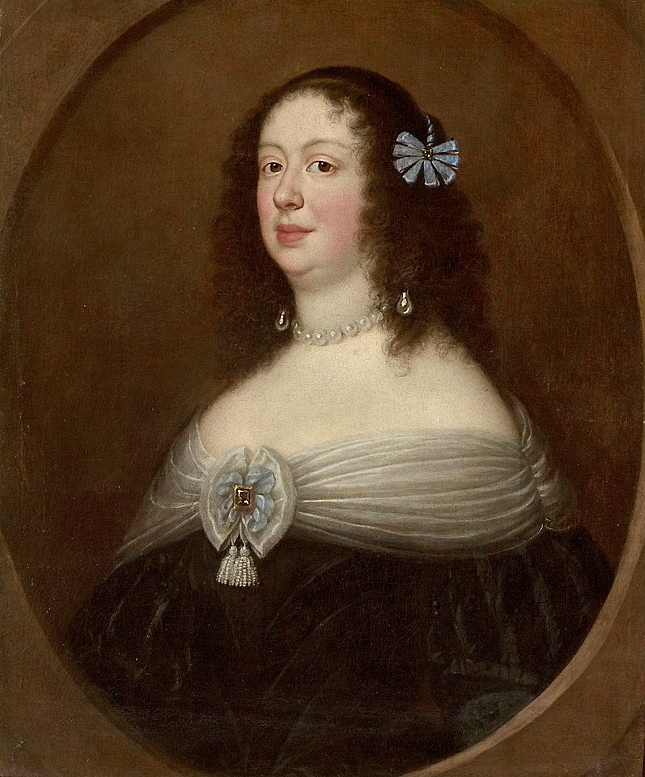
Anna as an Archduchess of Austria, c. 1652-1653, by a follower of Sustermans

Following failed plans for Anna to marry Gaston, Duke of Orléans, she was instead engaged to Ferdinand Charles, Archduke of Further Austria. In 1646, Anna left her native Florence for Innsbruck to be married. On 10 June, she was married to her double first cousin Ferdinand Charles. He was the eldest son of Leopold V, Archduke of Austria and his wife Claudia de' Medici. Anna was almost thirty years old, while Ferdinand Charles was only eighteen. The match was negotiated by Ferdinand Charles' formidable mother, who had been regent of Further Austria and Tyrol since Leopold's death in 1632. Claudia had ruled the duchy well in her regency from 1632 to 1646, and was successful in keeping Tyrol out of the Thirty Years War. During the year of their marriage, Ferdinand Charles took over his mother's gubernatorial duties and became the ruler of Tyrol and Further Austria, as he was now of age. Anna and Ferdinand Charles had three daughters. The couple preferred the attractions of the opulent Tuscan court to the mountains of Tyrol, and consequently were more often at Florence than at Innsbruck. As a result, their eldest daughter was born in Anna's home court, not Ferdinand Charles'.

=== Widowhood ===
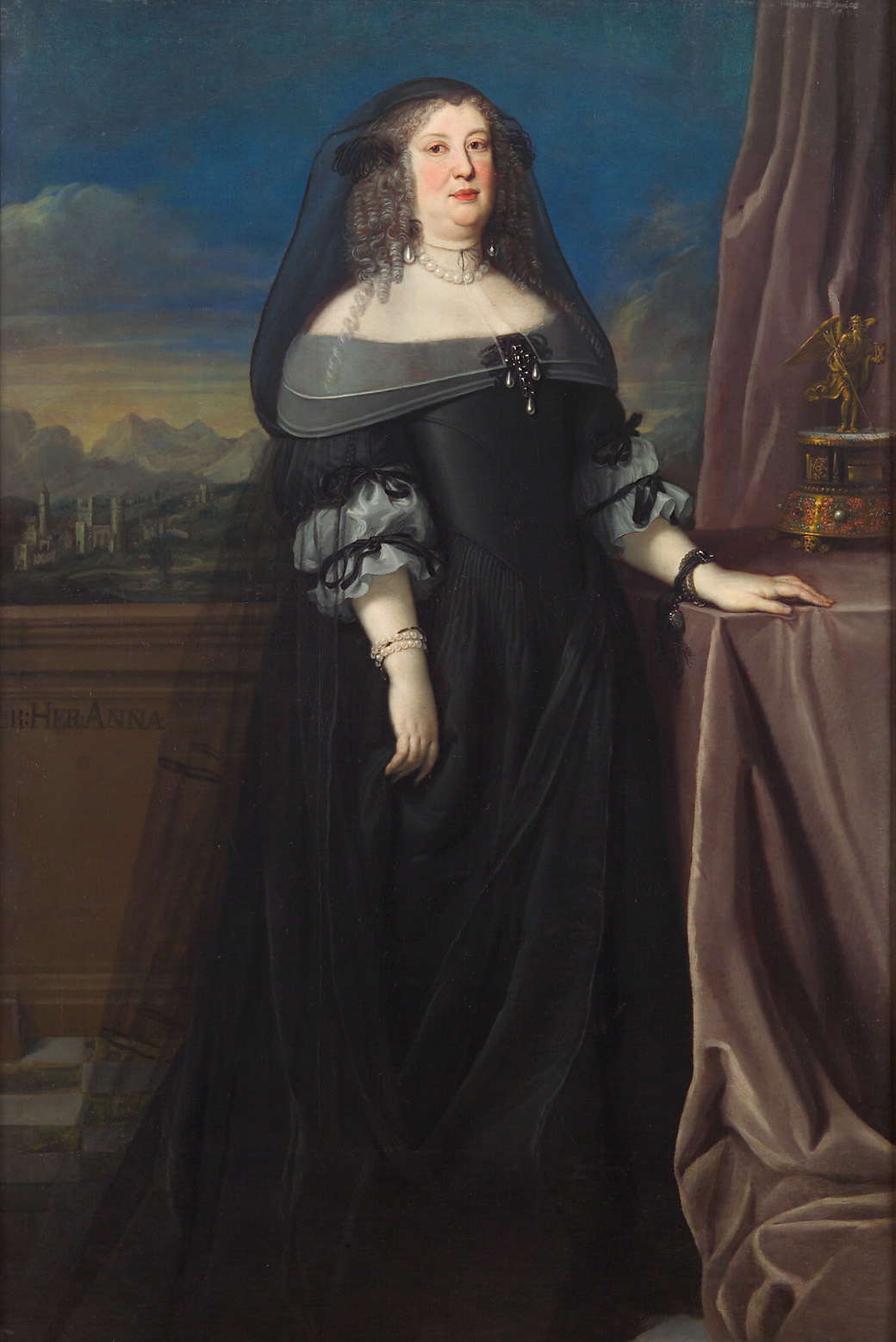
Anna de' Medici in widows garb, c. 1666, by Giovanni Maria Morandi.

In 1662, Ferdinand Charles died. As they had only two surviving daughters, his younger brother Sigismund Francis inherited the County of Tyrol and Further Austria. On the eve of his marriage to another princess however, Sigismund Francis died in 1665. This meant that the county reverted to direct rule from Vienna, despite the efforts of Anna to preserve some vestige of power for herself as dowager countess. Her attempts to persuade Vienna also stemmed from the fact that Anna wanted to protect the rights of her two daughters. The dispute was remedied in 1673, when Claudia Felicitas married Emperor Leopold I, who had seized the county.

Anna not only survived her husband by fourteen years but also outlived both her children. Maria Magdalena died in 1669, and Empress Claudia Felicitas died soon after her marriage. On 11 September 1676 in Vienna, Anna died aged sixty.

== Patron of the arts ==
Like many Medicis, Anna was a great lover and patron of the arts. For instance, a collection of monodies by Pietro Antonio Giramo, entitled Hospedale degli Infermi d'amore, was dedicated to Anna in Naples in the mid-seventeenth century (the specific date is unknown); it humorously presented the various forms of insanity caused by love. In the collection, Giramo's dedication to Anna seemingly referred to a flirtatious young lady when he mentions "the powerful glances of Anna's eyes which can cure all these infirmities of imaginative madnesses and vain desires of human hearts".

Giramo's dedication was not the end of works being devoted to Anna. In 1655, famed composer and singer Barbara Strozzi dedicated one of her works (opus 5, Sacri musicali affetti) to Anna, as Strozzi devoted all of her music publications to prominent aristocratic patrons. She also devoted other works to some of Anna's relatives (like her sister-in-law Vittoria della Rovere). Anna richly rewarded Strozzi for this dedication. We know Anna's gifts were especially notable because a Mantuan resident saw fit to describe them in letter to Charles II, Duke of Mantua and Montferrat, dated 14 April 1655:

"I will tell your most Serene Highness some curiosities that are not too serious. Barbara Strozzi dedicated to the Archduchess of Innsbruck some of her music; her Highness sent to her the other day a small gold box adorned with rubies and with her portrait, and a necklace, also of gold with rubies, which the said Signora prizes and shows off, placing it between her two darling, beautiful breasts."

== Issue ==
1. Archduchess Claudia Felicitas of Austria (30 May 1653 – 8 April 1676) married Leopold I, Holy Roman Emperor and had issue.
2. Unnamed archduchess (19 July 1654) died at birth.
3. Archduchess Maria Magdalena of Austria (17 August 1656 – 21 January 1669) died young.

== Ancestors ==
Ancestors of Anna de' Medici, Archduchess of Austria

8. Cosimo I de' Medici, Grand Duke of Tuscany
4. Ferdinando I de' Medici, Grand Duke of Tuscany
9. Eleanor of Toledo
2. Cosimo II de' Medici, Grand Duke of Tuscany
10. Charles III, Duke of Lorraine
5. Christina of Lorraine
11. Claude of Valois
1. Anna de' Medici
12. Ferdinand I, Holy Roman Emperor
6. Charles II, Archduke of Inner Austria
13. Anne of Bohemia and Hungary
3. Archduchess Maria Maddalena of Austria
14. Albert V, Duke of Bavaria
7. Maria Anna of Bavaria
15. Anna of Austria

== Sources ==
- Arias, Enrique Alberto (2001). Essays in Honor of John F. Ohl: a Compendium of American Musicology. Evanston, Illinois: Northwestern University Press. ISBN 0-8101-1536-0.
- Briscoe, James R. (2004). New Historical Anthology of Music by Women. Indiana University Press.
- Glixon, Beth L. (1997). "New Light on the Life and Career of Barbara Strozzi". The Musical Quarterly. 81 (2): 311–335. doi:10.1093/mq/81.2.311.
- Marrow, Deborah (1982). The art patronage of Maria de' Medici. UMI Research Press.
- Young, G. F. (1930). The Medici. New York: Charles Boni.
