= Leopoldo de' Medici =

Italian cardinal, scholar, patron of the arts and Governor of Siena (1617–1675)

Prince Leopoldo
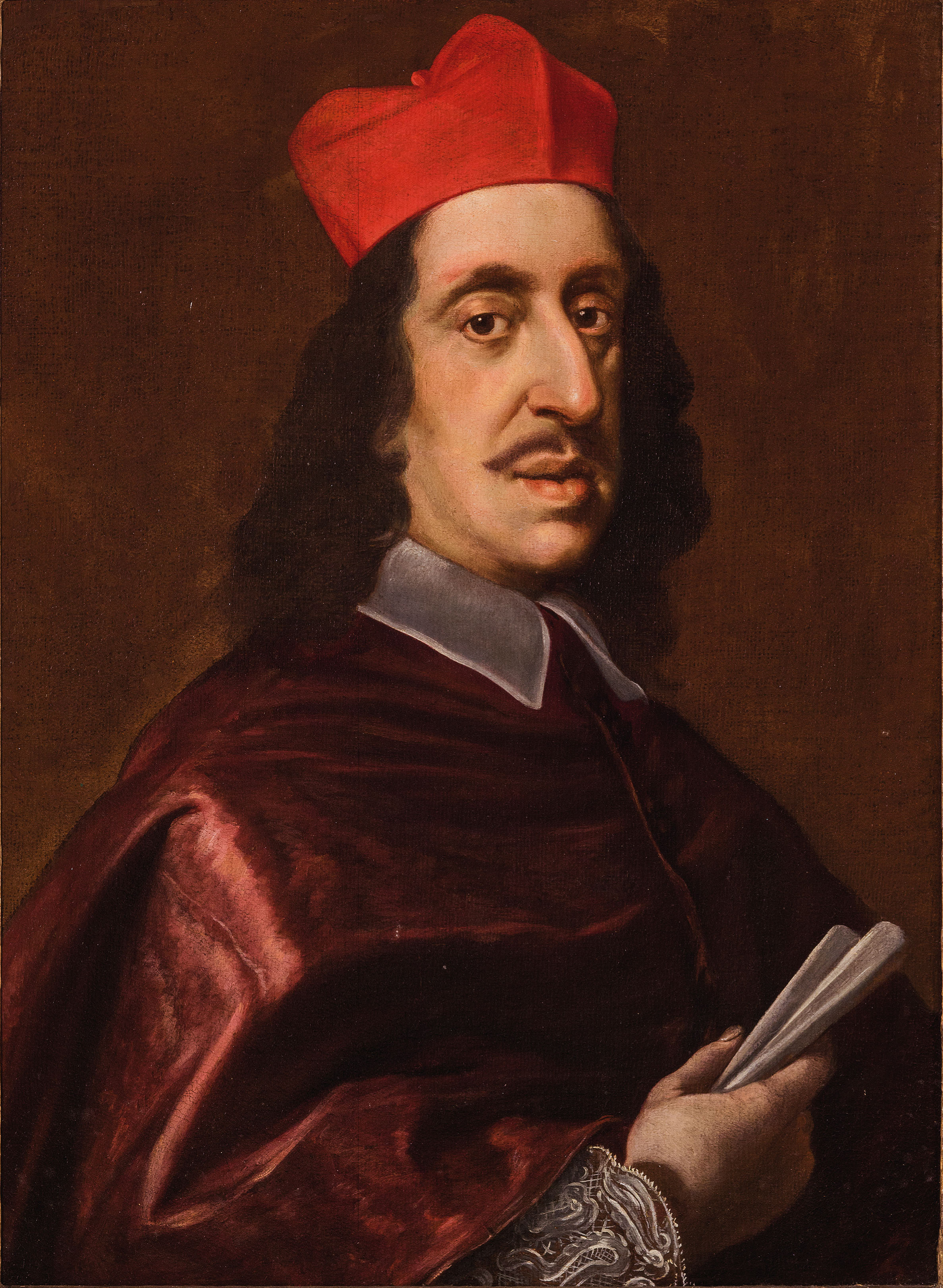
- Leopoldo de' Medici by Justus Sustermans
- Born: 6 November 1617; Palazzo Pitti, Florence, Tuscany
- Died: 10 November 1675 (aged 58); Florence, Tuscany
- Burial: The Basilica of San Lorenzo
Names
- Leopoldo de' Medici
- Grand Ducal: House of Medici
- Father: Cosimo II of Tuscany
- Mother: Maria Maddalena of Austria
- Religion: Roman Catholicism

Leopoldo de' Medici (6 November 1617 – 10 November 1675) was an Italian cardinal, scholar, patron of the arts and Governor of Siena. He was the brother of Ferdinando II de' Medici, Grand Duke of Tuscany.

== Biography ==
Prince Leopoldo was born at the Palazzo Pitti in Florence, the capital of the Grand Duchy of Tuscany then ruled by his father, Grand Duke Cosimo II. His mother Maria Magdalena of Austria was a sister of Queen Margarita of Spain and Ferdinand II, Holy Roman Emperor.

Leopoldo was educated under Jacopo Soldano, Father Flaviano Michelini and Evangelista Torricelli. When his brother was elected Grand Duke, Leopoldo acted as his advisor for manufactures, agriculture and trades. Leopoldo, a disciple of Galileo, took a real interest in the proceedings of the justly celebrated academy 'Del Cimento' (the test), signing its correspondence, following closely the work of Evangelista Torricelli da Modigliana, inventor of the barometer.

He took a great interest in science and technology. In 1638 he founded the Accademia Platonica, and, together with Ferdinando, the Accademia del Cimento ("Academy of Experiment") in 1657 to promote observation of nature through the Galileian Method. In 1641 Leopoldo had been named member of the Accademia della Crusca, for which he edited the entries regarding art for the 3rd edition of the Crusca Dictionary (1691).

Leopoldo was also a great collector of rare books, paintings (the Venetian collection at the Uffizi is inherited from him), drawings, statues, coins and self-portraits. He left a wide correspondence with artists and art collectors of his time. He experimented with telescopic lenses and all manner of scientific instruments, and also commissioned those thermometers, astrolabes, calorimeters, quadrants, hygrometers, quadrants and other ingenious mechanical devices which visitors to the Pitti Palace saw displayed in such profusion. Leopoldo spent four hours each day 'up to his neck in books'.

On 12 December 1667 Pope Clement IX named him cardinal of Santi Cosma e Damiano. From that point on Leopoldo made frequent trips to Rome, pursuing his artistic interests. He died in 1675. His large collections are included in several museums of Florence.

Leopoldo had a long correspondence with Christiaan Huygens.

== Ancestors ==
Ancestors of Leopoldo de' Medici

16. Giovanni dalle Bande Nere
8. Cosimo I de' Medici, Grand Duke of Tuscany
17. Maria Salviati
4. Ferdinando I de' Medici, Grand Duke of Tuscany
18. Pedro Álvarez de Toledo
9. Eleonora di Toledo
19. Maria Osorio Pimentel, Marchioness of Villafranca del Bierzo
2. Cosimo II de' Medici, Grand Duke of Tuscany
20. Francis I, Duke of Lorraine
10. Charles III, Duke of Lorraine
21. Christina of Denmark
5. Christina of Lorraine
22. Henry II of France
11. Claude of Valois
23. Catherine de' Medici
1. Leopoldo de' Medici
24. Philip I of Castile
12. Ferdinand I, Holy Roman Emperor
25. Joanna of Castile
6. Charles II of Austria
26. Vladislaus II of Bohemia and Hungary
13. Anna of Bohemia and Hungary
27. Anna of Foix-Candale
3. Maria Magdalena of Austria
28. William IV, Duke of Bavaria
14. Albert V, Duke of Bavaria
29. Marie of Baden-Sponheim
7. Maria Anna of Bavaria
30. Ferdinand I, Holy Roman Emperor (= 12)
15. Anna of Austria
31. Anna of Bohemia and Hungary (= 13)

Leopoldo de' Medici House of Medici Born: 6 November 1617 Died: 10 November 1675
Political offices
| Preceded by Mattias de' Medici | Governor of Siena; 1636–1641 | Succeeded by Mattias de' Medici |
| Preceded by Mattias de' Medici | Governor of Siena; 1643–1644 | Succeeded by Mattias de' Medici |
