= List of governors of Siena =

A list of the governors of Siena, a jurisdiction of the Grand Duchy of Tuscany (1569−1859) established after the dissolution of the Republic of Siena in 1555.

The republic was centered on the present day city of Siena, located in the Tuscany region of Italy.

== Governors of Siena ==
- Alfonso Piccolomini (1528–1530), (1531–1541), native of Siena.
- Caterina de' Medici (1627–1629) daughter of Ferdinando I de' Medici, Grand Duke of Tuscany.
- Leopoldo de' Medici (1636–1641), (1643–1644) son of Cosimo II de' Medici, Grand Duke of Tuscany.
- Mattias de' Medici (1629–1636), (1641–1643), son of Cosimo II de' Medici, Grand Duke of Tuscany.
- Francesco Maria de' Medici (1683-1711) son of Ferdinando II de' Medici, Grand Duke of Tuscany.
- Unknown (1711–1717)
- Violante Beatrice of Bavaria (1717–1731) daughter in law of Cosimo III de' Medici, Grand Duke of Tuscany.
