= Ferdinando II de' Medici =

Grand Duke of Tuscany from 1621 to 1670

Ferdinando II
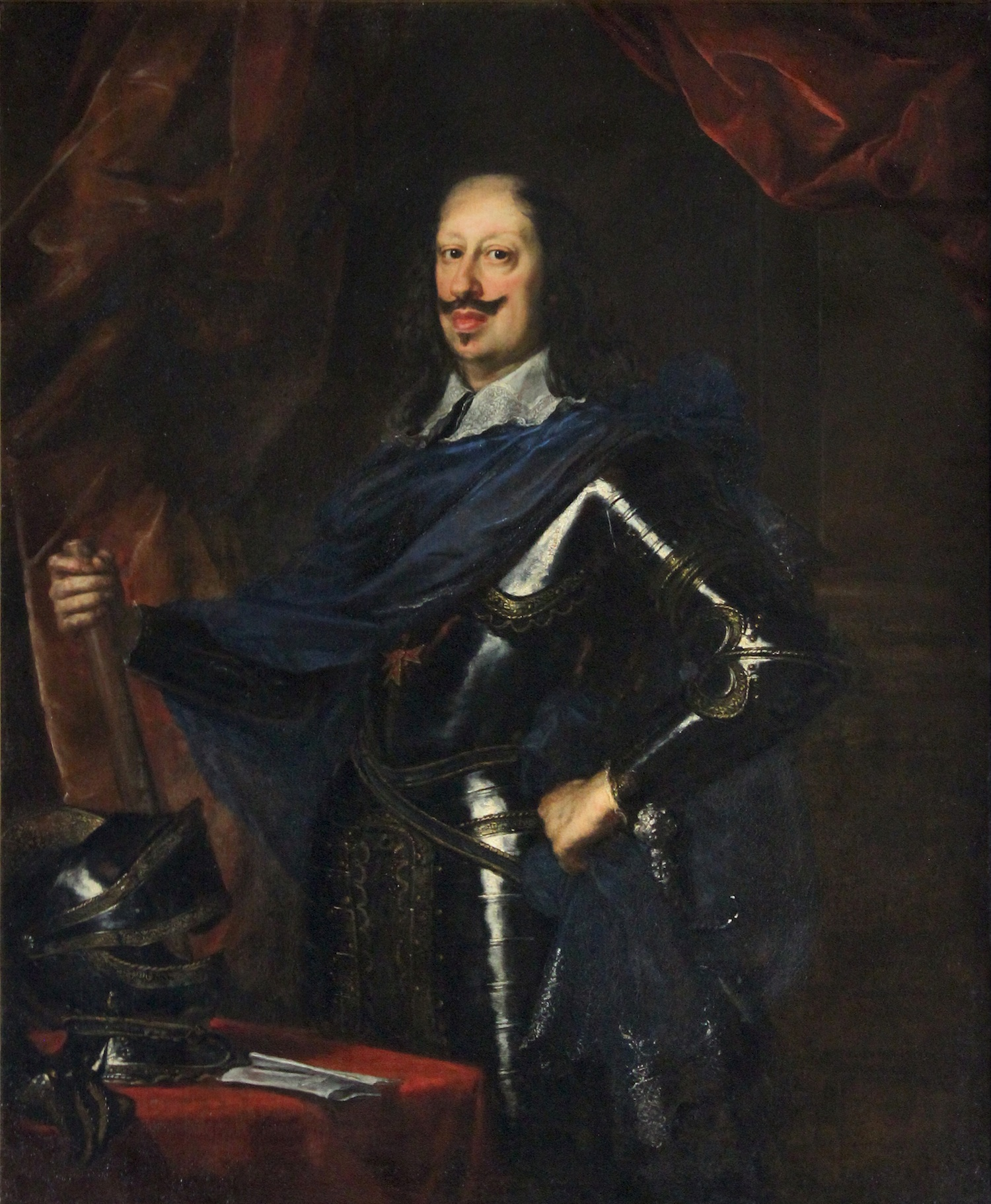
- Portrait by Justus Sustermans, 1653

Grand Duke of Tuscany
- Reign: 28 February 1621 – 23 May 1670
- Predecessor: Cosimo II
- Successor: Cosimo III
- Born: 14 July 1610; Pitti Palace, Florence, Grand Duchy of Tuscany
- Died: 23 May 1670 (aged 59); Pitti Palace, Florence, Grand Duchy of Tuscany
- Spouse: Vittoria della Rovere (m. 1632)
- Issue Detail: Cosimo III, Grand Duke of Tuscany; Francesco Maria, Duke of Rovere
Names
- Ferdinando de' Medici
- House: House of Medici
- Father: Cosimo II de' Medici
- Mother: Maria Maddalena of Austria
- Religion: Roman Catholicism
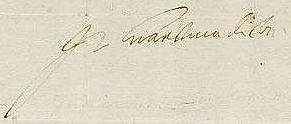
- Signature

Ferdinando II de' Medici (14 July 1610 – 23 May 1670) was Grand Duke of Tuscany from 1621 to 1670. He was the eldest son of Cosimo II de' Medici and Maria Maddalena of Austria. Remembered by his contemporaries as a man of culture and science, he actively participated in the Accademia del Cimento, the first official scientific society in Italy, formed by his younger brother, Leopoldo de' Medici. His 49-year rule was punctuated by the beginning of Tuscany's long economic decline, which was further exacerbated by his successor, Cosimo III de' Medici. He married Vittoria della Rovere, a first cousin, with whom he had two children who reached adulthood: the aforementioned Cosimo III, and Francesco Maria de' Medici, Duke of Rovere and Montefeltro, a cardinal.

== Reign ==
Ferdinando was only 10 years of age when his father Cosimo II died. Because he had not yet reached maturity, his mother Maria Maddalena and paternal grandmother, Christina of Lorraine, acted as joint regents. His two regents arranged a marriage with Vittoria della Rovere, a granddaughter of the last Duke of Urbino, in 1633, in hopes of acquiring the Duchy. However, their political weakness prevented them from securing Urbino, and it was subsequently conquered by the Papal States. In his seventeenth year, Ferdinando embarked on a tour of Europe, traveling to Rome, Bologna, Ferrara, Venice, and finally Austria and Prague. One year later, his personal rule began. The dowager Grand Duchess Christina was the power behind the throne until her death in 1636.

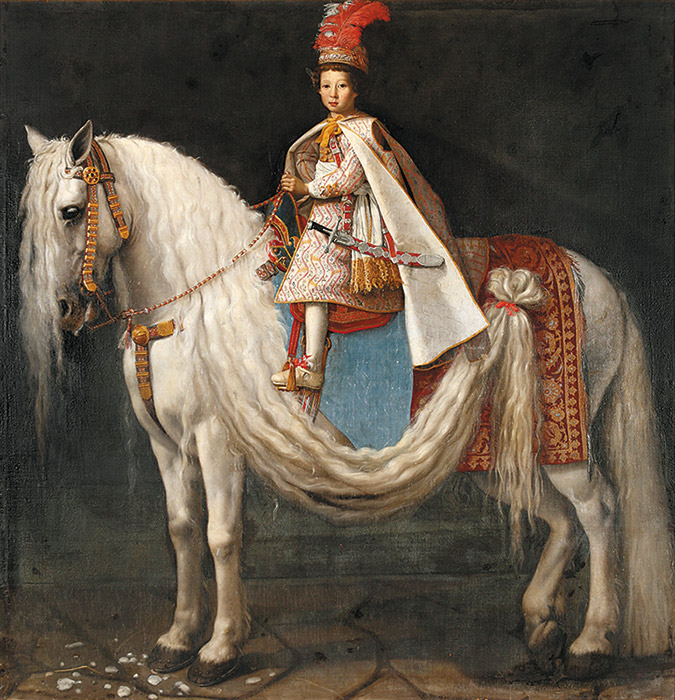
Equestrian portrait of Ferdinando de' Medici by Justus Sustermans

With his wife, Vittoria, he had two surviving children: Cosimo, in 1642, and Francesco Maria de' Medici, in 1660. The latter was the fruit of a brief reconciliation, as the two became estranged shortly after the birth of Cosimo; Vittoria caught Ferdinando in bed with a page, Count Bruto della Molera. In fact, Ferdinando's sexual preferences tended largely to men.

The first calamity of Ferdinando's reign was an outbreak of the plague that swept through Florence in 1630 and took 10% of the population with it. Unlike the Tuscan nobility, Ferdinando and his brothers stayed in the city to try to ameliorate the general suffering, traveling through the city on foot to support his subjects.

Tuscany participated in the Wars of Castro, the last time Medicean Tuscany was involved in a military conflict and inflicted a defeat on the forces of Pope Urban VIII in 1643. The treasury was so empty that when the Castro mercenaries were paid for the state could no longer afford to pay interest on government bonds. The interest rate was lowered by 0.75%. The economy became so decrepit that barter trade became prevalent in rural market places.

Ferdinando died on 23 May 1670 of apoplexy and dropsy. He was interred in the Basilica of San Lorenzo, the Medicis' crypt.

== Ferdinando and science ==
Ferdinando was obsessed with new technology and had several hygrometers, barometers, thermometers and telescopes installed in the Palazzo Pitti. In 1654, influenced by Galileo Galilei, he is reported to have invented the sealed-glass thermometer by sealing the glass tip of a tube filled to a certain height with colored alcohol. Small glass bubbles filled with air at varying pressures hovered trapped within the liquid, changing positions as the temperature rose or fell. Marked off with 360 divisions, like the gradations or "degrees" of a circle, this type of device was called a "spirit thermometer", because it was filled with "spirit of wine" (distilled alcohol), or a "Florentine thermometer". In 1657, Leopoldo de' Medici, the grand duke's youngest brother, established the Accademia del Cimento. It was set up to attract scientists from all over Tuscany to Florence for mutual study.

Ferdinand, like his father before him, was a patron, ally, and friend of Galileo Galilei. Galileo dedicated his Dialogue Concerning the Two Chief World Systems to him. This work led to Galileo's second set of hearings before the Inquisition. Ferdinand attempted to keep the concerns of the Holy See from leading to a full-fledged hearing and kept Galileo in Florence until December 1632, when the Roman Inquisitors finally threatened to bring Galileo to Rome in chains if he would not come voluntarily. In June 1633, the Roman Inquisition convicted the astronomer for "vehement suspicion of heresy" and sentenced him to imprisonment for life. After this was commuted to house arrest, Ferdinando came to visit the elderly scientist at his villa, where he lived out the remainder of his life.

Styles of Ferdinando II de' Medici, Grand Duke of Tuscany
- Reference style: His Highness
- Spoken style: Your Highness

== Issue ==
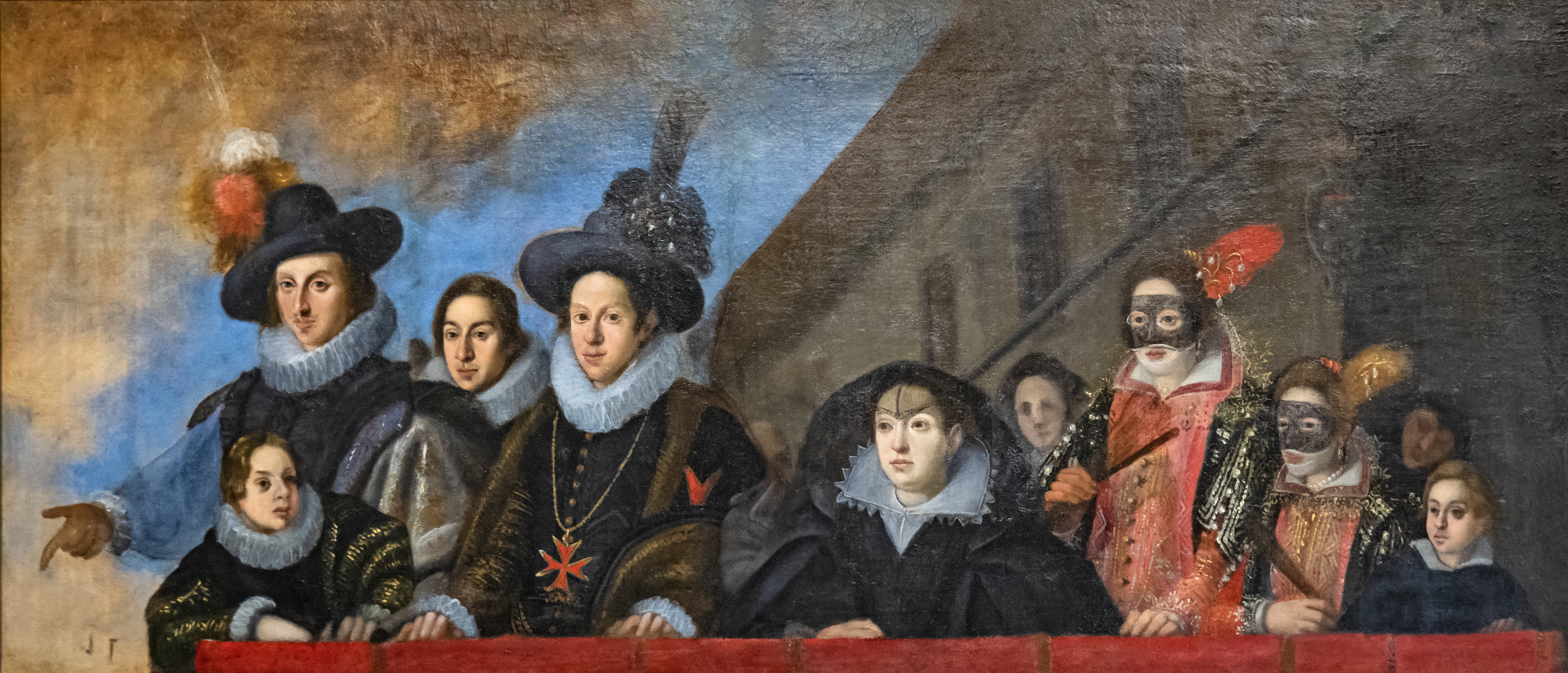
The family of Ferdinand II, Grand Duke of Tuscany (1622–1623), from left to right: Mattias, Gian Carlo, Francesco and the Grand Duke Ferdinand with the cross of Saint Stephen; the Duchess-mother Maria Magdalena of Austria, Marie-Christine, Marguerite, Anne and the young Leopold, Musée Ingres Bourdelle.

From his unhappy marriage to Vittoria Della Rovere, Ferdinand II had four children, of which only two reached adulthood:

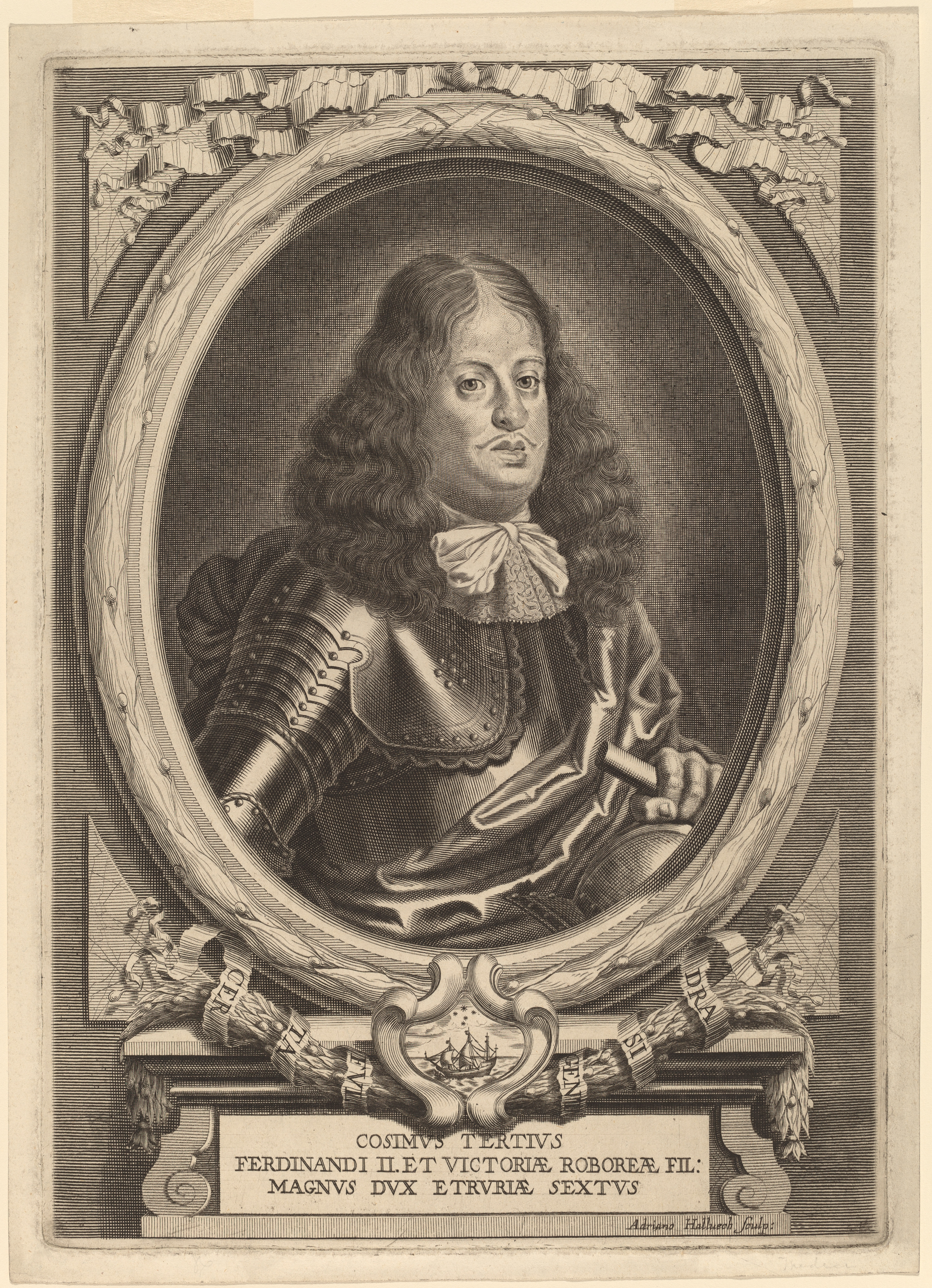
1. Cosimo III, second son of Ferdinando II, engraving by Adriaen Haelwegh
  Cosimo, Grand-Prince of Tuscany (19 December 1639 – 21 December 1639)
2. A nameless daughter who died at birth (1640)
3. Cosimo III, (14 August 1642 – 31 October 1723), Grand Duke of Tuscany following his father's death, married to Marguerite Louise d'Orléans, with issue
4. Francesco Maria (12 November 1660 – 3 February 1711), Duke of Rovere and Montefeltro, married to Eleonora Luisa Gonzaga, without issue

== Ancestry ==
Ancestors of Ferdinando II de' Medici

8. Cosimo I de' Medici, Grand Duke of Tuscany
4. Ferdinando I de' Medici, Grand Duke of Tuscany
9. Eleonora di Toledo
2. Cosimo II de' Medici, Grand Duke of Tuscany
10. Charles III, Duke of Lorraine
5. Christina of Lorraine
11. Claude of Valois
1. Ferdinando II de' Medici, Grand Duke of Tuscany
12. Ferdinand I, Holy Roman Emperor
6. Charles II of Austria
13. Anna of Bohemia and Hungary
3. Maria Magdalena of Austria
14. Albert V, Duke of Bavaria
7. Maria Anna of Bavaria
15. Anna of Austria

== See also ==
- Grand Duchy of Tuscany

== Citations ==
Ferdinando II de' Medici House of Medici Born: 14 July 1610 Died: 23 May 1670
Regnal titles
Preceded by Cosimo II de' Medici	Grand Duke of Tuscany; 1621–1670	Succeeded by Cosimo III de' Medici
Italian royalty
Preceded by Cosimo di Ferdinando de' Medici	Hereditary Prince of Tuscany; 1610–1621	Succeeded by Cosimo di Ferdinando de' Medici
