= Leopold V, Archduke of Austria =

Austrian bishop and archduke (1586–1632)

Leopold V
- Bishop of Passau and Strasbourg
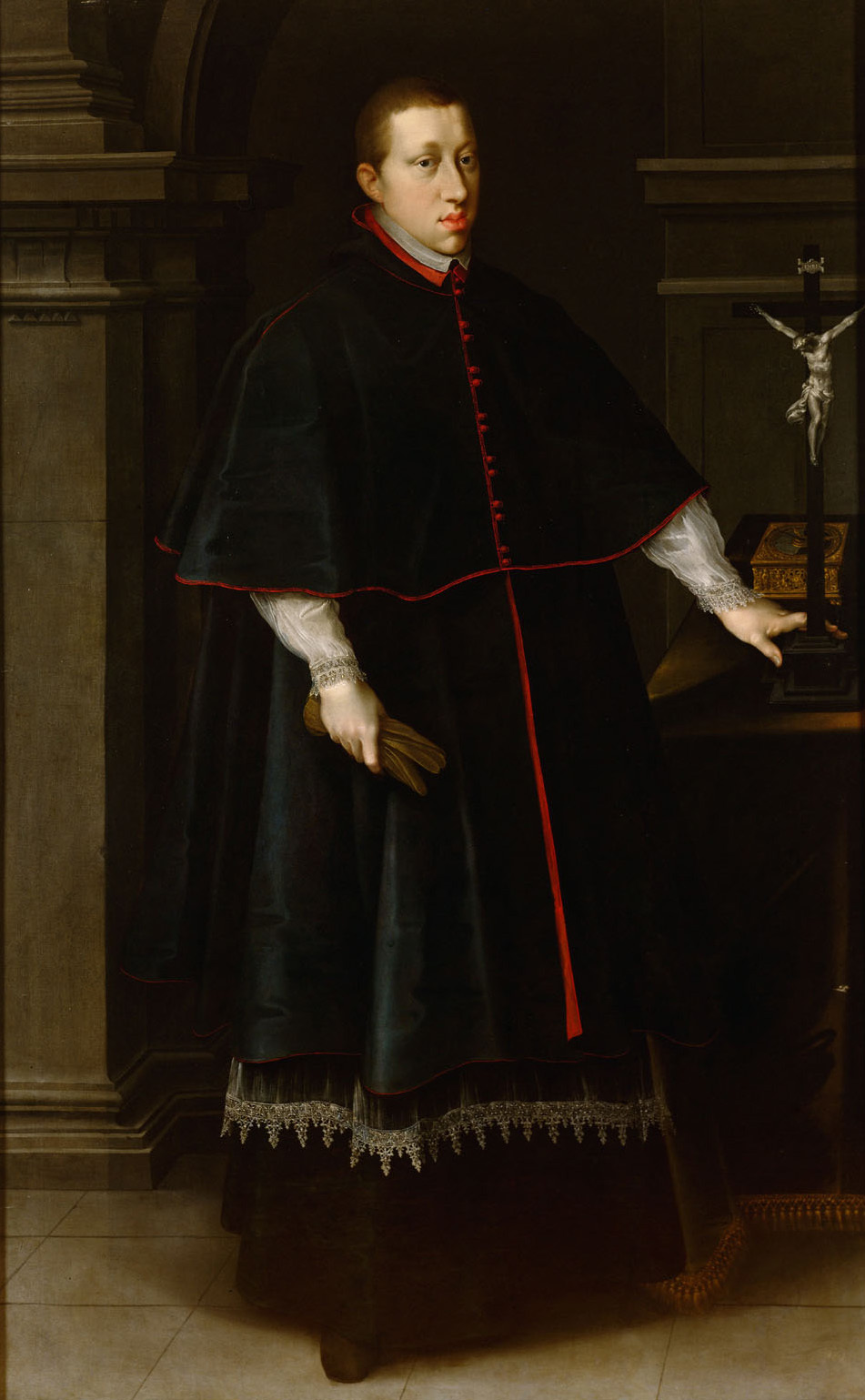
- Portrait by Joseph Heintz the Elder, c. 1604

Archduke of Further Austria
- Reign: 1623 – 13 September 1632
- Predecessor: Maximilian III (1618)
- Successor: Ferdinand Charles
- Born: 9 October 1586; Graz, Duchy of Styria, Holy Roman Empire
- Died: 13 September 1632 (aged 45); Schwaz, County of Tyrol, Holy Roman Empire
- Spouse: Claudia de' Medici (m. 1626)
- Issue: Maria-Eleonora of Austria; Ferdinand Charles, Archduke of Austria; Isabella Clara, Duchess of Mantua and Montferrat; Sigismund Francis, Archduke of Austria; Maria Leopoldine, Holy Roman Empress
- House: Habsburg
- Father: Charles II, Archduke of Austria
- Mother: Maria Anna of Bavaria
- Religion: Roman Catholicism

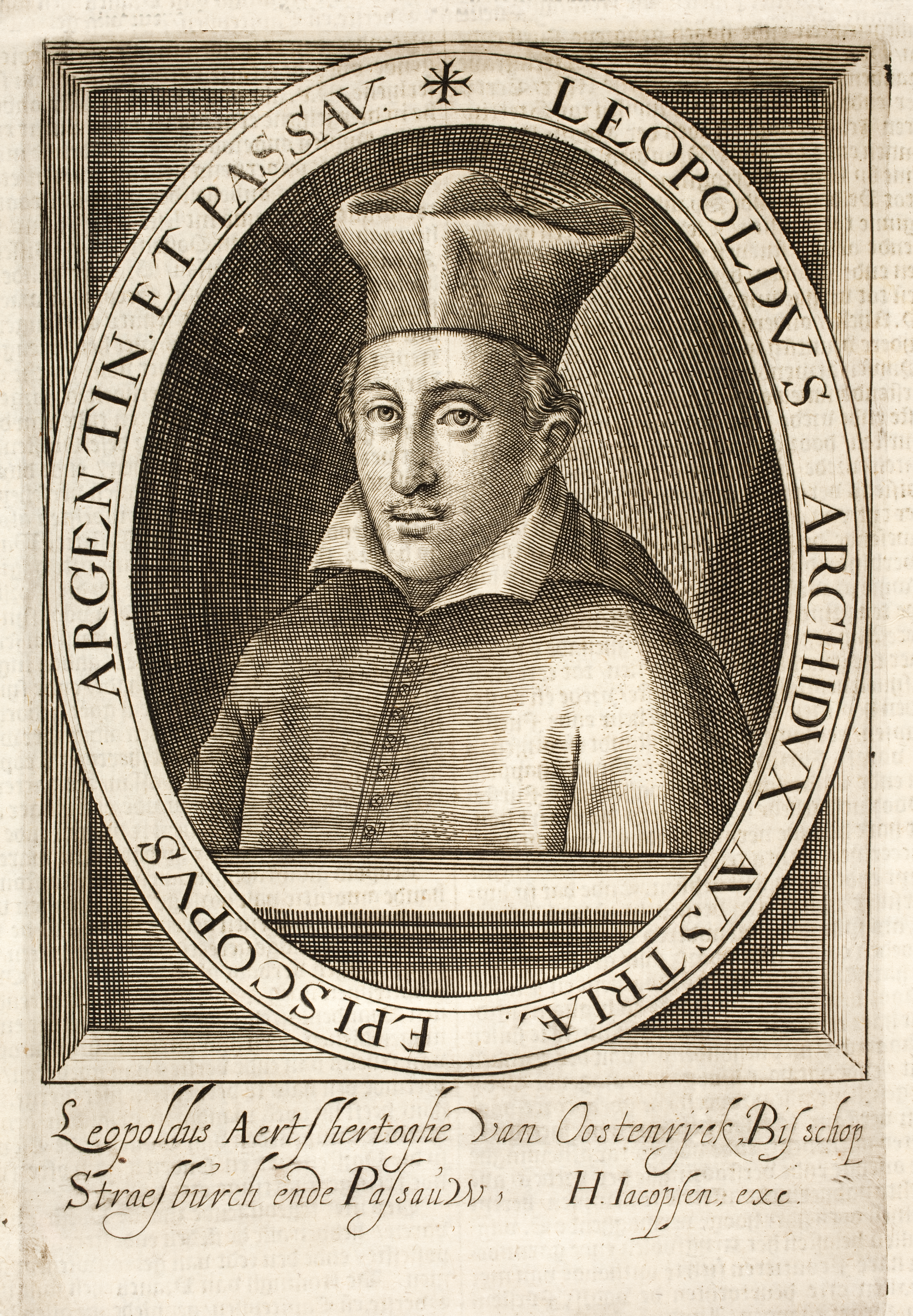
Engraving of Leopold V, Archduke of Austria

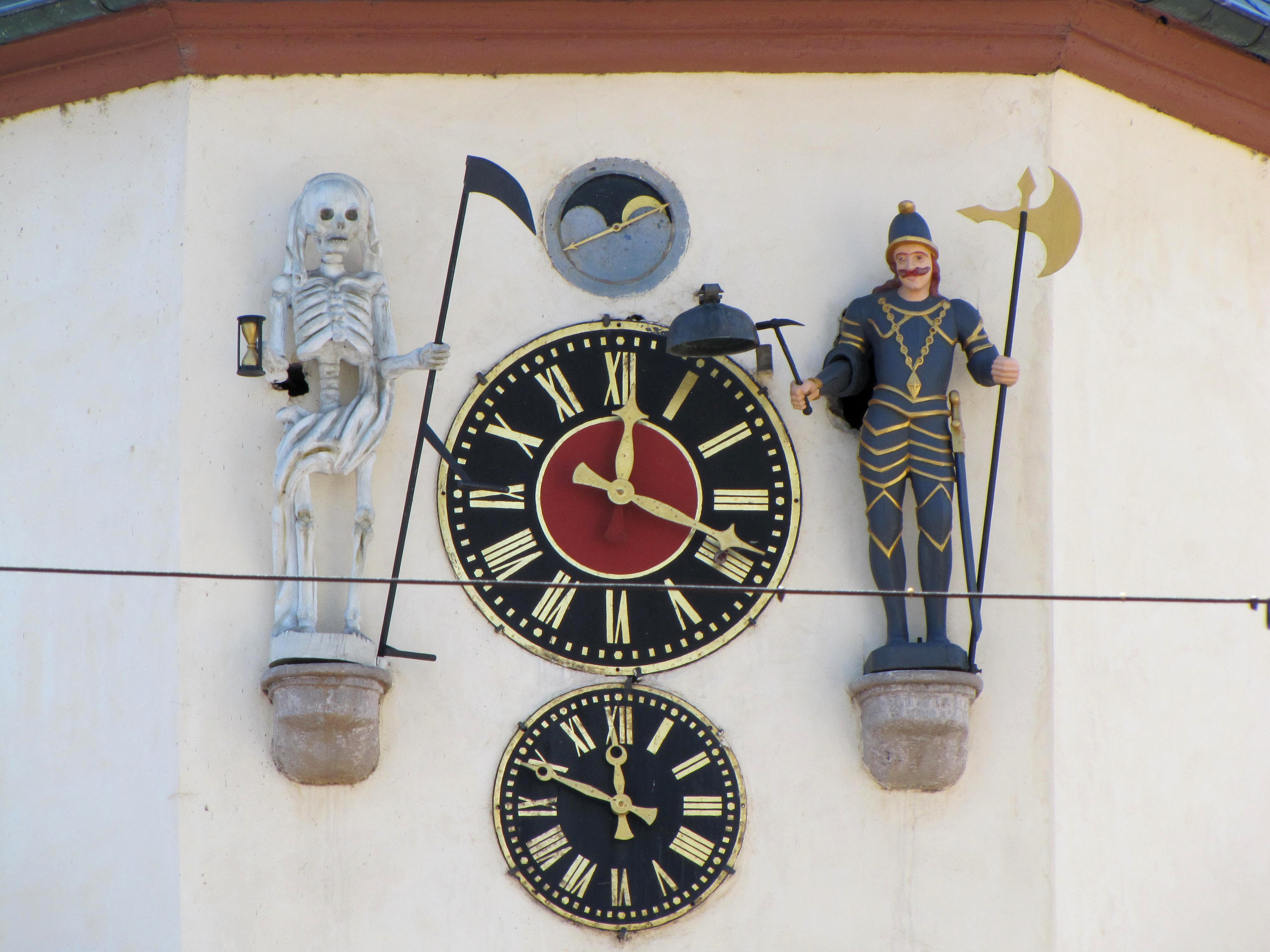
Lepold V as a jacquemart on the Hôtel de Ville, Benfeld (1619)

Leopold V, Archduke of Further Austria (9 October 1586 – 13 September 1632) was the son of Archduke Charles II of Inner Austria, and the younger brother of Emperor Ferdinand II, father of Ferdinand Charles, Archduke of Further Austria. He was Prince-Bishop of Passau and of Strasbourg, until he resigned to get married, and Archduke of Further Austria including Tyrol.

== Biography ==
Leopold was born in Graz, and was invested as bishop in 1598, as a child, even though he had not been ordained as a priest; he became Prince-Bishop of Strasbourg in 1607, a post which he held until 1626. From 1609 onwards he fought with his mercenaries in the War of the Jülich succession (Archduke Leopold in the War of the Jülich Succession), and in the Brothers' Quarrel within the Austrian Habsburg dynasty against his first cousin Maximilian III, Archduke of Further Austria in Tyrol, and from 1611 for his first cousin Rudolf II in Bohemia. In 1614, he financed the construction of the Church of the Jesuit College of Molsheim, within which his coat of arms is still prominently displayed.

In 1619, upon the death of his kinsman and former rival, he became governor of Maximilian's inheritance: Further Austria and Tyrol, where he attained the position of ruler as Archduke of Further Austria from 1626 to his death in 1632. In 1626 he resigned his ecclesiastical positions and married Claudia de' Medici. He had the custom house and the Jesuit church built in Innsbruck. He fought for the Veltlin and defended Tyrol against the Swedes in 1632. He died in Schwaz, Tyrol.

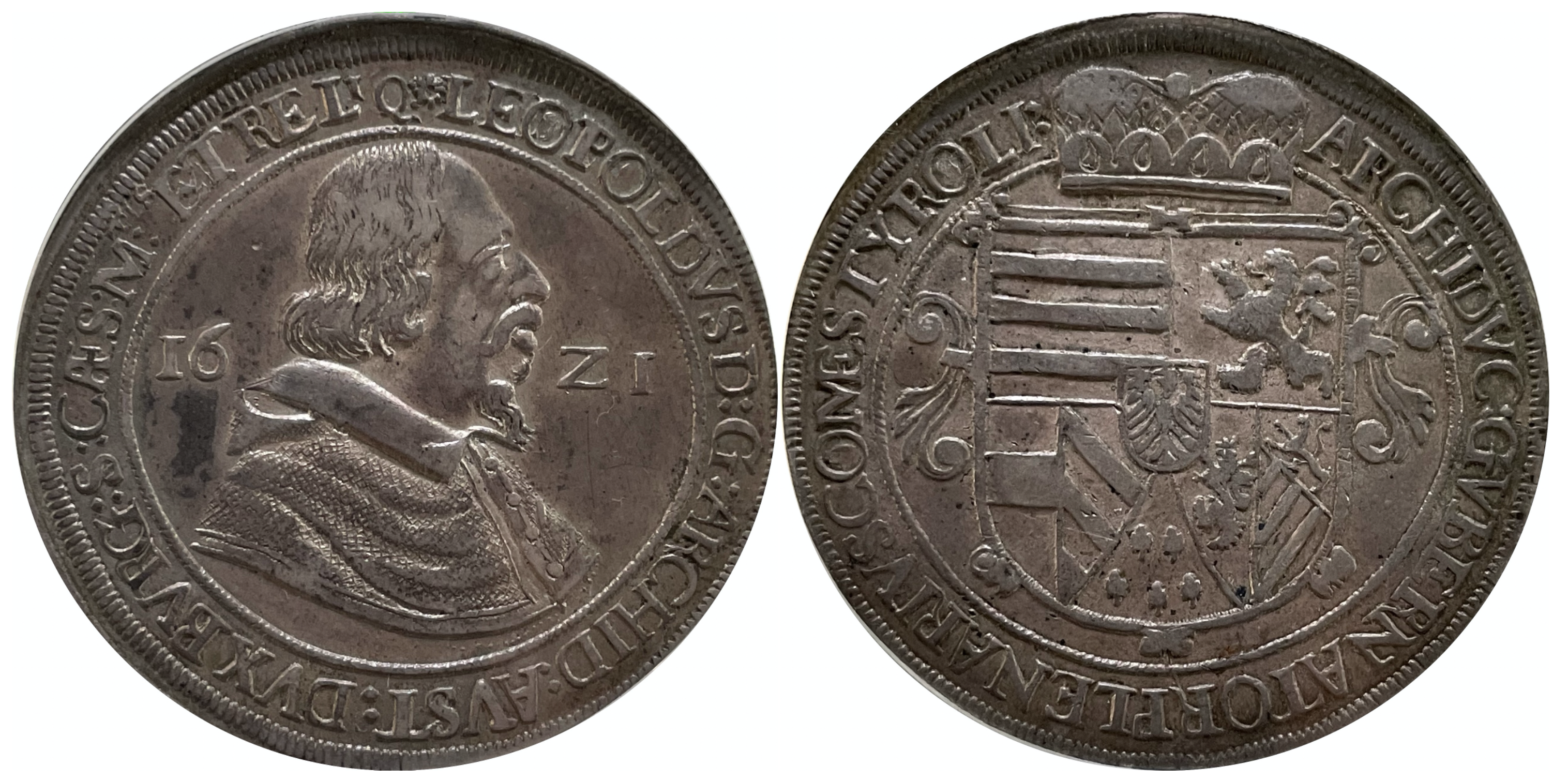
Silver coin: 1 thaler County of Tyrol, Leopold V - 1621

== Issue ==
With his wife Claudia de' Medici, he became the founder of a sideline of the Habsburg family, which persisted until 1665 - the most recent line of Archdukes of Further Austria.

His children were:

- Maria-Eleonora 1627–1629
- Ferdinand Charles (1628–1662); married Anna de' Medici
- Isabella Clara (1629–1685); married Charles III, Duke of Mantua
- Sigismund Francis (1630-1665); married Hedwig of the Palatinate-Sulzbach
- Maria Leopoldine (1632–1649); married Emperor Ferdinand III

== Ancestors ==
Ancestors of Leopold V, Archduke of Austria

8. Philip I of Castile (= 28)
4. Ferdinand I, Holy Roman Emperor (=14)
9. Joanna of Castile (= 29)
2. Charles II, Archduke of Austria
10. Vladislas II of Bohemia and Hungary (= 30)
5. Anna of Bohemia and Hungary (=15)
11. Anna of Foix-Candale (= 31)
1. Leopold V, Archduke of Austria
12. William IV, Duke of Bavaria
6. Albert V, Duke of Bavaria
13. Marie of Baden-Sponheim
3. Maria Anna of Bavaria
14. Ferdinand I, Holy Roman Emperor (= 4)
7. Anna of Austria
15. Anna of Bohemia and Hungary (= 5)

== Male-line family tree ==
House of Habsburg

Original line
Albert; Count of Habsburg c. 1188–1239
Rudolf I of Germany c. 1218–1291
Albert I of Germany; 1255–1308	Hartmann; 1263–1281	Rudolf II; Duke of Austria; 1270–1290
Rudolf I of Bohemia; 1281–1307	Frederick the Fair c. 1289–1330	Leopold I Duke of Austria; 1290–1326	Albert II; Duke of Austria; 1298–1358	Henry the Friendly; 1299–1327	Otto; Duke of Austria; 1301–1339	John; Parricida c. 1290–1312/1313
Albertinian line	Leopoldian line
Rudolf IV; Duke of Austria; 1339–1365	Frederick III; 1347–1362	Albert III; Duke of Austria; 1349–1395	Leopold III; Duke of Austria; 1351–1386	Frederick II; Duke of Austria; 1327–1344	Leopold II; Duke of Austria; 1328–1344
Albert IV; Duke of Austria; 1377–1404	William; Duke of Austria c. 1370–1406	Leopold IV; Duke of Austria; 1371–1411	Ernest; Duke of Austria; 1377–1424	Frederick IV; Duke of Austria; 1382–1439
Albert II of Germany; 1397–1439	Frederick III; HRE; 1415–1493	Albert VI; Archduke of Austria; 1418–1463	Sigismund; Archduke of Austria; 1427–1496
Ladislaus the Posthumous; 1440–1457	Maximilian I HRE; 1459–1519
Philip I of Castile; 1478–1506
Spanish / Iberian line	Austrian / HRE line
Charles V HRE; 1500–1558	Ferdinand I HRE; 1503–1564
Philip II of Spain; 1527–1598	Maximilian II; HRE; 1527–1576	Ferdinand II; Archduke of Austria; 1529–1595	Charles II; Archduke of Austria; 1540–1590
Carlos; Prince of Asturias; 1545–1568	Philip III of Spain; 1578–1621	Rudolf II; HRE; 1552–1612	Ernest of Austria; 1553–1595	Matthias; HRE; 1557–1619	Maximilian III; Archduke of Austria; 1558–1618	Albert VII; Archduke of Austria; 1559–1621	Wenceslaus; Archduke of Austria; 1561–1578	Andrew; Margrave of Burgau; 1558–1600	Charles; Margrave of Burgau; 1560–1618	Ferdinand II; HRE; 1578–1637	Maximilian Ernest of Austria; 1583–1616	Leopold V Archduke of Austria; 1586–1632	Charles of Austria; 1590–1624
Philip IV of Spain; 1605–1665	Charles of Austria; 1607–1632	Ferdinand of Austria; 1609–1641	John-Charles of Austria; 1605–1619	Ferdinand III; HRE; 1608–1657	Leopold Wilhelm of Austria; 1614–1662	Ferdinand Charles; Archduke of Austria; 1628–1662	Sigismund Francis; Archduke of Austria; 1630–1665
Balthasar Charles; Prince of Asturias; 1629–1646	Charles II of Spain; 1661–1700	Ferdinand IV; King of the Romans; 1633–1654	Leopold I HRE; 1640–1705	Charles Joseph of Austria; 1649–1664
Joseph I HRE; 1678–1711	Charles VI; HRE; 1685–1740
Lorraine
Maria Theresa; HRE; 1740–1780	Francis I HRE; 1745–1765
Habsburg-Lorraine
Joseph II; HRE; 1765–1790	Leopold II; HRE; 1790–1792
Francis II; HRE; 1792–1806

Notes:

Leopold V, Archduke of Austria House of Habsburg Born: 9 October 1586 Died: 13 September 1632
Regnal titles
Preceded by Maximilian III	Governor, later Archduke of Further Austria	Succeeded by Ferdinand Charles
Catholic Church titles
Preceded by Charles of Lorraine	Bishop of Strasbourg; 1607–1626	Succeeded by Leopold William of Austria
