= Christina of Lorraine =

Grand Duchess of Tuscany from 1589 to 1609

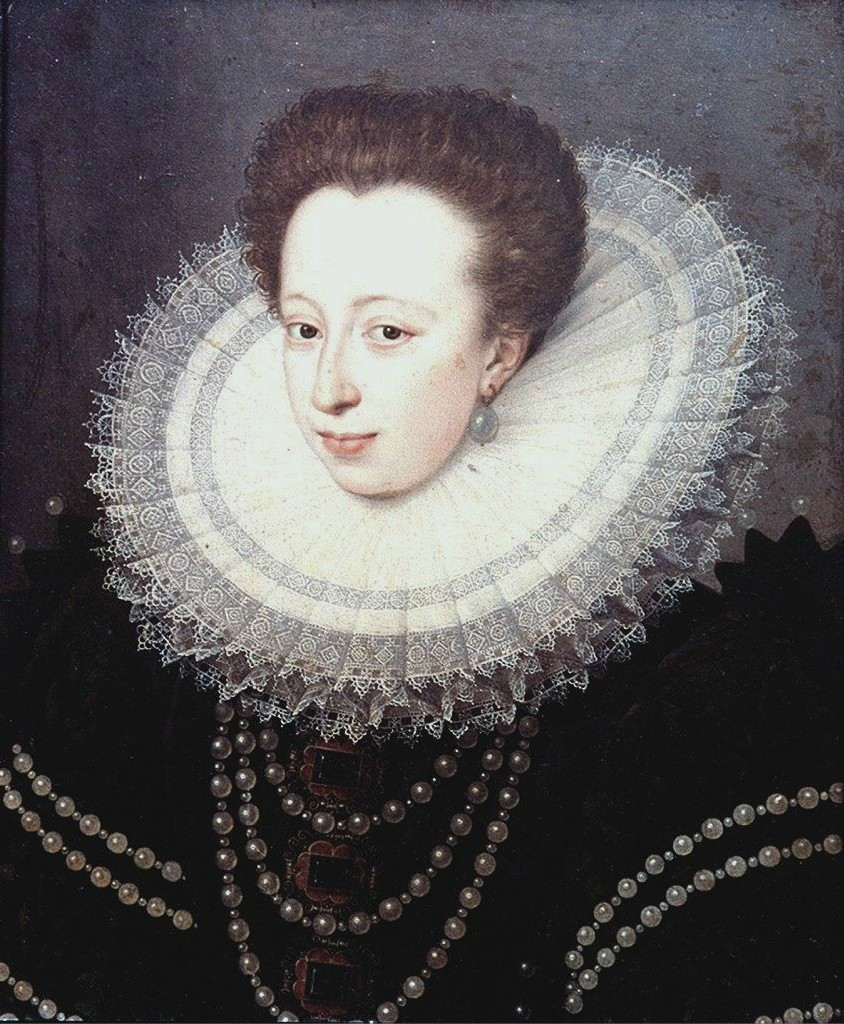
- Portrait of Christine, 1588

Grand Duchess consort of Tuscany
- Tenure: 3 May 1589 – 17 February 1609
- Born: Christine de Lorraine; 16 August 1565; Ducal Palace of Nancy, Lorraine
- Died: 19 December 1637 (aged 72); Palazzo Pitti, Florence, Tuscany
- Burial: Basilica of San Lorenzo, Florence
- Spouse: Ferdinando I, Grand Duke of Tuscany
- Issue: Cosimo II, Grand Duke of Tuscany; Maria Maddalena de' Medici; Catherine, Governor of Siena; Carlo de' Medici; Claudia, Archduchess of Austria
- House: House of Lorraine (by birth); House of Medici (by marriage)
- Father: Charles III, Duke of Lorraine
- Mother: Claude of Valois

Christina of Lorraine (French: Christine de Lorraine, Italian: Cristina di Lorena; 16 August 1565 – 19 December 1637) was a princess of Lorraine who became Grand Duchess of Tuscany by marriage to Ferdinando I de' Medici. She served as regent of Tuscany jointly with her daughter-in-law during the minority of her grandson from 1621 to 1628.

== Princess of Lorraine ==
Born in Nancy, she was the daughter of Charles III of Lorraine and his wife Claude of Valois, and granddaughter of Catherine de' Medici. She was named after her paternal grandmother, Christina of Denmark.

== Grand Duchess of Tuscany ==
In 1584, Mary, Queen of Scots, hoped that Christina would marry her son, King James VI, rather Catherine of Bourbon, the sister of Henry III of Navarre. Mary thought that Christina, as her relative, would be a useful ally to her. Mary wrote to Catherine de' Medici, Queen of France, about this marriage plan, but nothing came of it.

In 1587, Francesco I de' Medici, Grand Duke of Tuscany died without a legitimate male heir; his brother Ferdinando immediately declared himself the third Grand Duke of Tuscany. Seeking a marriage that would preserve his political independence, Ferdinando chose his distant cousin, Christina of Lorraine, the favourite granddaughter of Catherine de' Medici. Catherine had influenced her towards this marriage, to re-align the Medici with France, not Spain.

The well-documented wedding festivities, celebrated in Florence in 1589, were designed to impress the royal houses of Europe. The wedding ceremony in Florence Cathedral was followed by outdoor events for the public, as well as banquets and balls, comedies and musical interludes, and a mock sea battle in the flooded courtyard of Palazzo Pitti for the guests. PJ Mariette takes note of the various artists including Santi di Tito, Gregorio Pagani, Camillo Pagni, and Giovanni Battista Paggi, who worked on the decorations. Altogether the wedding cost approximately fourteen million pounds in today's currency. These innovative forms of entertainment proved to be more than showmanship. They influenced theatrical practices in European courts throughout the 17th century.

On 28 July 1603 she wrote to Anne of Denmark to congratulate her and King James coming to the throne of England. The letter was brought to London by Count Alfonso Montecuccoli.

== Grand Duke Cosimo II ==
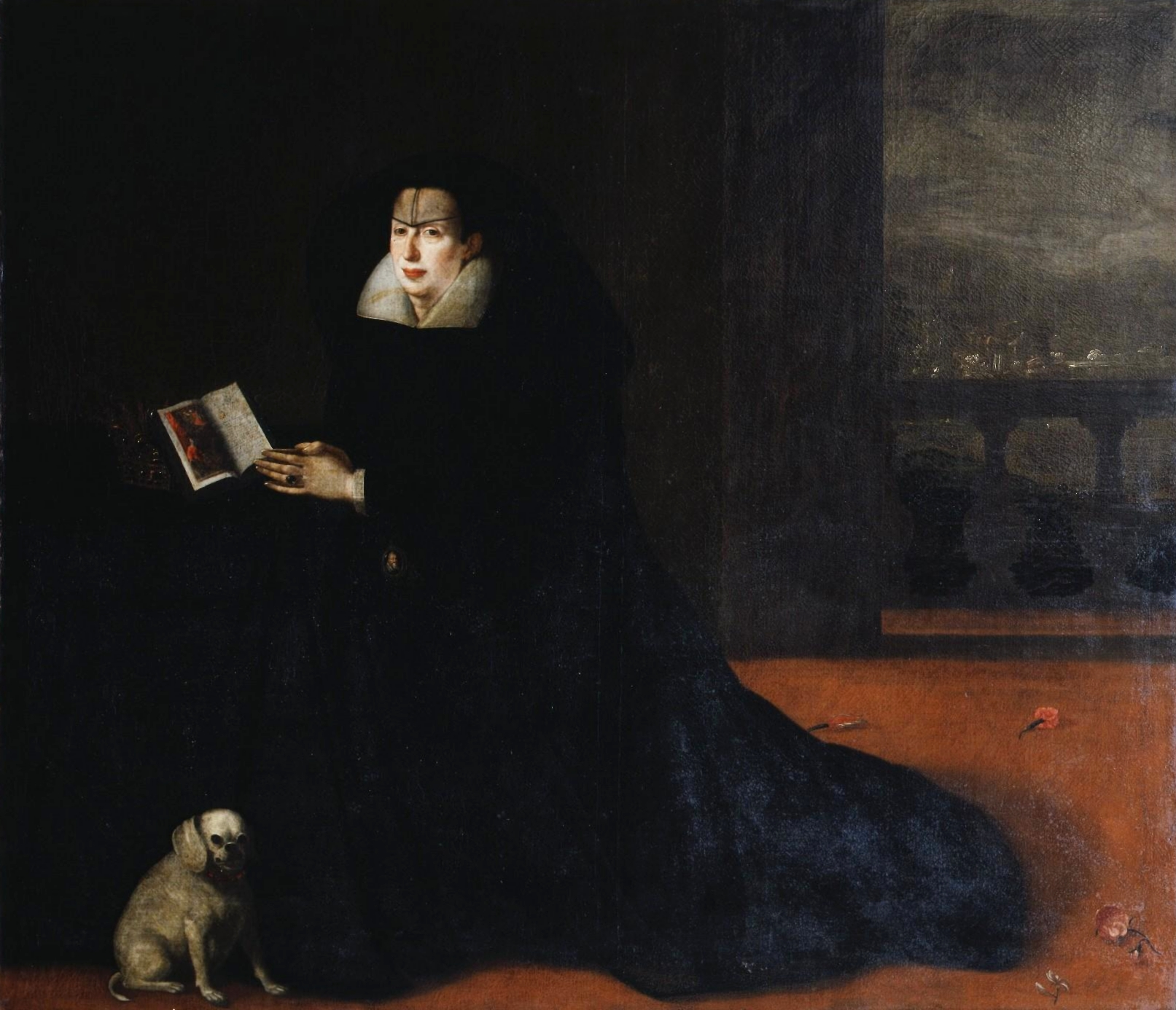
Christina as a widow by Tiberio di Tito, c. 1610–1615

Christina's husband died in early 1609, shortly after their son had wed.Cosimo II was only 19 when he assumed power, and Christina remained a dominant force at the court. In 1610 the Venetian ambassador Giacomo Vendramin wrote home: "the grand duchess wants thus to govern everything absolutely, without any thought to the reputation and the benefit of her son". Christina was keen to bolster the dynastic claim of the Medici, and commissioned a biography of the first grand duke and her father-in-law Cosimo I. She also commissioned engravings by Jacques Callot to showcase the life of her late husband Ferdinando I.

== Co-Regency of Tuscany ==
Her son Cosimo II died in February 1621, leaving his ten-year-old son Ferdinando II as grand duke. Christina and her daughter-in-law, Maria Maddalena of Austria, acted as regents until the boy came of age. Their regency is known as the Tutrici. Little is known about the relationship between the two women, though they coexisted at court. Maria Maddalena took on the public political role by taking the seat in the primo luogo. Christina took charge of engaging with the Florentine religious establishment. Maria Maddalena assumed the title of archduchess. Christina became known as the Dowager Grand Duchess, and sent Ferdinando II on a tour of Europe in 1627. Maria Maddalena died in November 1631, shortly after her son Ferdinando II had formally assumed the position of grand duke.

Maria Maddalena' brother was the Holy Roman Emperor Ferdinand II and she supported his anti-Protestant politics. Together with her brother she supported the militant wing of the Jesuits, with their Counter-Reformation ideology. Contemporary sources did not pass judgement on the quality of the co-regency, but focused on detailing the daily going-on at court. The historian Jacopo Riguccio Galluzzi remarked about the co-regency: "everything started to decline from the moment of Cosimo II's death". Galluzzi criticised that in the co-regency religious men were allowed to enter administrative ranks in the Tuscan government. Galluzzi also lamented that both women continued to influence Ferdinando II after he had come of age. Angelo Solerti, an important source on the Florentine court lamented that "the Jesuits acted as if they were in charge". The co-regents did abolish a century old law in 1623 to allow patricians to participate in the government of Florence. As a consequence patricians started to occupy positions in a range of institutions of the Medici government and in the civil service. This move was intended to weaken the power of the Roman aristocrats in Florentine government. This strategy was continued by Ferdinando II.

Christina died at the Medici villa in Castello, aged 72, in December 1636.

== Patronage ==
=== Science ===
Christina was chosen by Fernando as a bride not only because she was a devout Catholic, but also because she was intelligent and well educated. Christina had received a scholarly education due to the efforts of Catherine de' Medici. In 1605, she invited Galileo Galilei to tutor her son Cosimo II de' Medici. Among other things, Galilei taught Cosimo the use of the geometric and military compass. In 1608 Christina asked Galileo to attend Cosimo's wedding to Maria Maddalena of Austria and in the same year asked him to cast a horoscope for her ill husband. Following the death of his father, Cosimo assumed the throne in February 1609, and Galileo applied for patronage at the Medici court.

Christina and the Medici Court also offered patronage to the philosopher Cosimo Boscaglia. When the court was in Pisa during winter, in December 1613, Galileo's former student Benedetto Castelli was invited to court. At a breakfast attended by Cosimo II, his wife, his mother Christina, and Boscaglia, the Medicean stars were discussed. These were the four moons of Jupiter that Galileo had discovered and named after Cosimo II and his brothers. Boscaglia conceded that these moons were real, and not an illusion produced by the lens of the telescope. But Boscaglia argued that Galileo's interpretation of his discoveries was wrong, mainly because "the motion of the Earth seemed incredible and could not be true, all the more so since Holy Scripture was clearly against this opinion." Christina asked Castelli for his opinion on the matter, not as a mathematician but as a theologian. Castelli responded that with regards to the exact workings of nature, he gave precedence to natural philosophers, and that theologians should in the light of these findings determine the meaning of the Bible. In the letter to Galileo, Castelli stated that Christina criticized heliocentrism, and Galileo did not like this. However, Christina's disagreement was prompted by Boscaglia rather than by her own thought.

Galileo had been attacked in front of his paymasters, and after being warned by Castelli and an exchange of views with his former student, he drafted a response. In his Letter to Grand Duchess Christina Galileo expounded on the relationship between science and revelation. He argued that the Scripture does not intend to teach natural philosophy, but conveys the message of salvation. Thus there was not need to reconcile the Bible with science, and that it would damage the authority of the Church in the unbelieving world if it was to make rash pronouncements about science. This line of argument resembled Christina's own views on the matter, and is in essence the position the Catholic Church takes today on questions of science.

=== Female monasteries ===
Christina's reputation for piety stems from her patronage for Florentine religious institutions, particularly female monasteries. She became an active patron immediately after her marriage. In 1592, she and her daughters were granted permission by Pope Clement VIII to enter Florentine convents during the day. Through her patronage the Monastero di Santa Croce (or La Crocetta) became the principal residence for unmarried Medici princesses. As a young woman, Christina had expressed the wish to finish her life in a convent, but she never withdrew from political affairs. She did, however, commission the construction of a residence for herself next to Crocetta to spend less time at the Medici court in Pitti Palace. In 1627 she purchased a villa, renamed it La Quiete and had it decorated in iconographic style by Giovanni da San Giovanni.

== Issue ==
- Cosimo II de' Medici, (1590–1621) married Maria Maddalena of Austria and had issue.
- Eleonora de' Medici (1591–1617) died unmarried.
- Caterina de' Medici (1593–1629) married Ferdinando Gonzaga, Duke of Mantua; later Governor of Siena;
- Francesco de' Medici (1594–1614) died unmarried.
- Carlo de' Medici (1595–1666) died unmarried.
- Filippino de' Medici (1598–1602) died unmarried.
- Lorenzo de' Medici (1599–1648) died unmarried.
- Maria Maddalena de' Medici (1600–1633) died unmarried.
- Claudia de' Medici (1604–1648) married (1) Federico della Rovere and had issue (2) Leopold V, Archduke of Austria and had issue.

== Ancestry ==
Ancestors of Christina of Lorraine

8. Antoine, Duke of Lorraine
4. Francis I, Duke of Lorraine
9. Renée de Bourbon
2. Charles III, Duke of Lorraine
10. Christian II of Denmark
5. Princess Christina of Denmark
11. Archduchess Isabella of Austria
1. Princess Christina of Lorraine
12. Francis I of France
6. Henry II of France
13. Princess Claude of France
3. Princess Claude of France
14. Lorenzo de' Medici, Duke of Urbino
7. Catherine de' Medici
15. Madeleine de La Tour d'Auvergne

== Notes ==
Christina of Lorraine House of Lorraine Born: 16 August 1565 Died: 19 December 1637
Italian royalty
| Vacant Title last held by Bianca Cappello | Grand Duchess consort of Tuscany; 1589–1609 | Succeeded by Maria Maddalena of Austria |
