= Grand princesses of Tuscany =

The Grand Princess of Tuscany was the spouse of the Grand Prince of Tuscany, heir to the Tuscan throne.

== Grand Princess of Tuscany ==
=== House of Medici ===
Picture	Name	Father	Birth	Marriage	Became Princess	Ceased to be Princess	Death	Spouse
	Joanna of Austria	Ferdinand I, Holy Roman Emperor (Habsburg)	24 January 1547	18 December 1565		21 April 1574 became Grand Duchess	11 April 1578	Francesco de' Medici
	Maria Maddalena of Austria	Charles II, Archduke of Austria (Habsburg)	7 October 1589	19 October 1608		17 February 1609 became Grand Duchess	1 November 1631	Cosimo de' Medici
	Marguerite Louise d'Orléans	Gaston, Duke of Orléans (Orléans)	28 July 1645	20 June 1661		23 May 1670 became Grand Duchess	17 September 1721	Cosimo de' Medici
	Violante Beatrice of Bavaria	Ferdinand Maria, Elector of Bavaria (Wittelsbach)	23 January 1673	9 January 1689		31 October 1713 husband's death	30 May 1731	Ferdinando de' Medici
	Anna Maria Franziska of Saxe-Lauenburg	Julius Francis, Duke of Saxe-Lauenburg (Ascania)	13 June 1673	2 July 1697	31 October 1723	31 October 1723 became Grand Duchess	15 October 1741	Gian Gastone de' Medici

== See also ==
- List of Tuscan consorts
