= Grand Prince of Tuscany =

Historically, the heir to the Tuscan throne

The Grand Prince of Tuscany was the heir to the Tuscan throne.

== Grand Prince of Tuscany ==
=== House of Medici ===
Picture	Name	Father	Birth	Became Prince	Ceased to be Prince	Death	Spouse	Marriage
	Francesco de' Medici	Cosimo I de' Medici, Grand Duke of Tuscany	25 March 1541	21 August 1569; Tuscany becomes Grand Duchy	21 April 1574 becomes Grand Duke	17 October 1587	Joanna of Austria	18 December 1565
	Filippo de' Medici	Francesco I de' Medici, Grand Duke of Tuscany	20 May 1577		29 March 1582		never married	
	Cosimo de' Medici	Ferdinando I de' Medici, Grand Duke of Tuscany	12 May 1590		17 February 1609 became Grand Duke	28 February 1621	Maria Maddalena of Austria	19 October 1608
	Ferdinando de' Medici	Cosimo II de' Medici, Grand Duke of Tuscany	14 July 1610		28 February 1621 became Grand Duke	23 May 1670	Vittoria della Rovere	26 September 1633
	Cosimo de' Medici	Ferdinando II de' Medici, Grand Duke of Tuscany	14 August 1642		23 May 1670 became Grand Duke	31 October 1723	Marguerite Louise d'Orléans	12 June 1661
	Ferdinando de' Medici, Grand Prince of Tuscany	Cosimo III de' Medici, Grand Duke of Tuscany	9 August 1663	23 May 1670	31 October 1713		Violante Beatrice of Bavaria	9 January 1689
	Gian Gastone de' Medici	Cosimo III de' Medici, Grand Duke of Tuscany	24 May 1671	30 October 1713	31 October 1723 became Grand Duke	9 July 1737	Anna Maria Franziska of Saxe-Lauenburg	2 July 1697

== See also ==
- List of grand dukes of Tuscany
