= Anna Maria Luisa de' Medici =

Last lineal descendant of the House of Medici

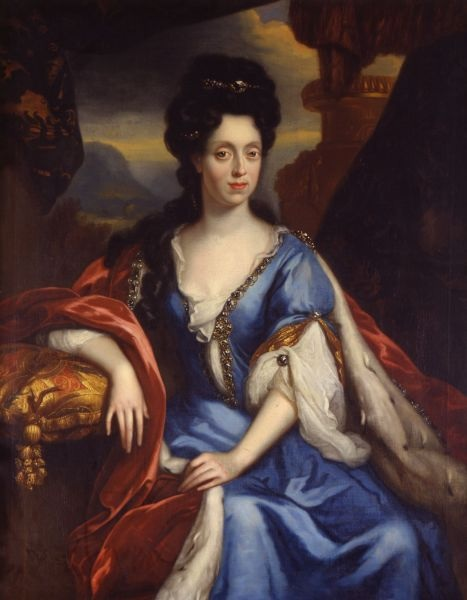
- Portrait by Jan Frans van Douven

Electress Palatine
- Tenure: 5 June 1691 – 8 June 1716
- Born: 11 August 1667; Palazzo Pitti, Florence, Grand Duchy of Tuscany
- Died: 18 February 1743 (aged 75); Palazzo Pitti, Florence, Grand Duchy of Tuscany
- Burial: Basilica of San Lorenzo, Florence 43°46′30″N 11°15′13″E
- Spouse: Johann Wilhelm, Elector Palatine (m. 1691; died 1716)
- House: Medici
- Father: Cosimo III de' Medici, Grand Duke of Tuscany
- Mother: Marguerite Louise d'Orléans

Anna Maria Luisa de' Medici (11 August 1667 – 18 February 1743) was an Italian noblewoman who was the last lineal descendant of the main branch of the House of Medici. A patron of the arts, she bequeathed the Medicis' large art collection, including the contents of the Uffizi, Palazzo Pitti, and the Medici villas, which she inherited upon her brother Gian Gastone's death in 1737, and her Palatine treasures to the Tuscan state, on the condition that no part of it could be removed from "the Capital of the grand ducal State....[and from] the succession of His Serene Grand Duke."

Anna Maria Luisa was the only daughter of Cosimo III de' Medici, Grand Duke of Tuscany, and Marguerite Louise d'Orléans, a niece of Louis XIII of France. On her marriage to Johann Wilhelm, Elector Palatine, she became Electress of the Palatinate, and, by patronising musicians, she earned for the contemporary Palatine court the reputation of an important music centre. After a single miscarriage, her marriage remained childless, which, combined with her siblings' barrenness, meant that the Medici were on the verge of extinction.

In 1713 Cosimo III altered the Tuscan laws of succession to allow the accession of his daughter, and spent his final years canvassing the European powers to agree to recognise this statute. However, in 1735, as part of a territorial arrangement, the European powers appointed Duke Francis Stephen of Lorraine as heir, and he duly ascended the Tuscan throne in her stead. After the death of Johann Wilhelm, Anna Maria Luisa returned to Florence, where she enjoyed the rank of first lady until the accession of her brother Gian Gastone, who banished her to the Villa La Quiete. When Gian Gastone died in 1737, Francis Stephen's envoy offered Anna Maria Luisa the position of nominal regent of Tuscany, but she declined. Her death, in 1743, brought the grand ducal House of Medici to an end. Her remains were interred in the Medicean necropolis, Basilica of San Lorenzo, Florence, which she helped complete.

== Biography ==
=== Early life ===
Despite her mother's efforts to induce a miscarriage by means of riding, Anna Maria Luisa de' Medici, the only daughter and second child of Cosimo III de' Medici, Grand Duke of Tuscany, and his consort, Marguerite Louise d'Orléans, was born in Florence on 11 August 1667. She was named after her maternal aunt Anne Marie Louise d'Orléans, Duchess of Montpensier.

Her parents' relationship was quarrelsome; Marguerite Louise took every chance to humiliate Cosimo. On one documented occasion, she branded him "a poor groom" in the presence of the Papal nuncio. The enmity between them continued until 26 December 1674; after all attempts at conciliation failed, a stressed Cosimo consented to his wife's departure for the Convent of Montmartre, France. The contract created that day revoked her privileges as a petite fille de France, and declared that upon her death all her assets were to be inherited by her children. Cosimo granted her a pension of 80,000 livres in compensation. She abandoned Tuscany in June 1675; Anna Maria Luisa, who was less than eight years old at that time, never saw her again. Although Cosimo doted on his daughter, she was raised by her paternal grandmother, Vittoria della Rovere.

=== Electress of the Palatinate ===
In 1669, Anna Maria Luisa was considered as a potential bride to Louis, le Grand Dauphin, the heir-apparent of Louis XIV of France. Cosimo III did not like the idea of a French marriage, and never devoted himself fully to the cause (she was later rejected). Instead, Cosimo offered her to his first choice, Peter II of Portugal. Peter's ministers declined, fearing that Anna Maria Luisa might have inherited her mother's temperament, and may seek to dominate Peter II while being herself intractable to reason. In fact, contemporaries thought her traits to be a combination of those of her father and paternal grandmother, Vittoria della Rovere.

Following refusals from Portugal, France, Spain and Savoy, James II of England put forward his brother-in-law, Francesco II d'Este, Duke of Modena, but the Princess deemed a duke too lowly in terms of protocol for the daughter of a grand duke. Finally, it was Leopold I, Holy Roman Emperor who suggested Johann Wilhelm, Elector Palatine. The Elector Palatine obtained the style Royal Highness from the Holy Roman Emperor for Cosimo III in February 1691. (Cosimo had hitherto been outranked by the Duke of Savoy — much to his anger—who derived royal status from his successful pretendership to the abolished Cypriot throne). Consequently, Johann Wilhelm was ultimately chosen. He and Anna Maria Luisa were married by proxy on 29 April 1691. At the accompanying festivities, a contemporary describes the Electress's physical attributes: "In her person, she is tall, her complexion was fair, her eyes large and expressive, both those and her hair were black; her mouth was small, with a fullness of the lips; her teeth were as white as ivory...."

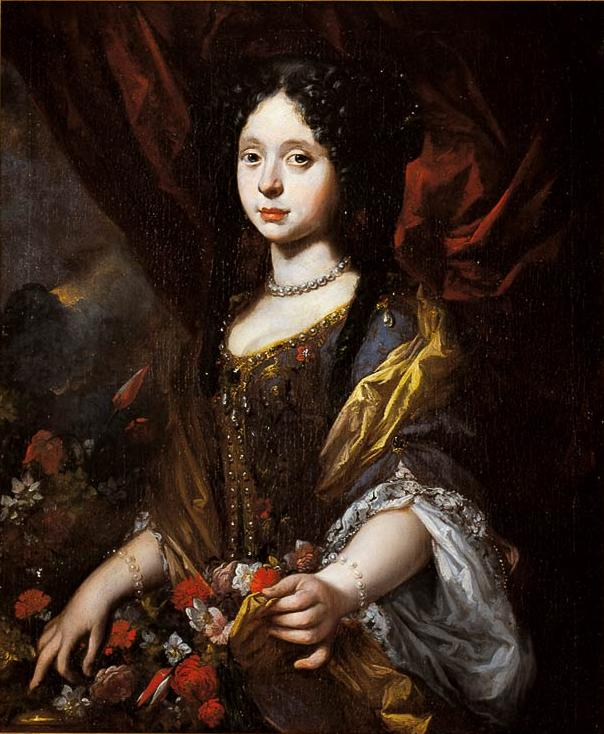
Anna Maria Luisa in Portrait of Anna Maria Luisa de' Medici with flowers by Antonio Franchi, c. 1682–1683

She departed for Düsseldorf, her husband’s capital, on 6 May 1691, accompanied by her younger brother, Gian Gastone. Johann Wilhelm surprised her at Innsbruck, where they officially married. The Palatinate Anna Maria Luisa arrived in was ravaged by the ongoing Nine Years' War, in which Louis XIV assaulted the Palatinate on behalf of his brother, Philippe I, Duke of Orléans, occupying the city of Philippsburg in the process.

The Electress became pregnant in 1692; however, she miscarried. It is thought incorrectly by some historians that soon after arrival she contracted syphilis from the Elector, which they think explains why Anna Maria Luisa and Johann Wilhelm failed to produce any children. Anna Maria Luisa and Johann Wilhelm, notwithstanding, shared a harmonious marriage. The Electress spent her time enjoying balls, musical performances and other festivities. He commissioned a theatre for her where the comedies of French playwright Molière were performed. Because Anna Maria Luisa patronised many musicians, the contemporary Palatine court enjoyed regard as an international centre of music. She invited Fortunato Chelleri to court and appointed him maestro di cappella ("music teacher"). Agostino Steffani, a polymath, was sponsored by the Electress from his arrival in Düsseldorf, in 1703, until her return to Tuscany; the Conservatorio Luigi Cherubini library in Florence houses two editions of his chamber duets.

Anna Maria Luisa arranged a marriage for her younger brother at the instigation of their father: On 2 July 1697 Gian Gastone de' Medici married Anna Maria Franziska of Saxe-Lauenburg, heiress of the eponymous duchy, in Düsseldorf. Gian Gastone's wife repulsed him, and for that reason, they separated in 1708.

The same year as Gian Gastone's marriage, the Peace of Ryswick ended the Nine Years' War: French troops withdrew from the Electoral Palatinate and Johann Wilhelm received the County of Megen. Following the revocation of the Edict of Nantes, a document which had hitherto given rights to Calvinists, in 1685, 2,000 French Huguenots emigrated to the Electoral Palatinate. Johann Wilhelm, under criticism for his treatment of the Palatine Protestants from the Elector of Brandenburg introduced a Religionsdeklaration in 1705, which sanctioned religious freedom.

=== Tuscan succession ===
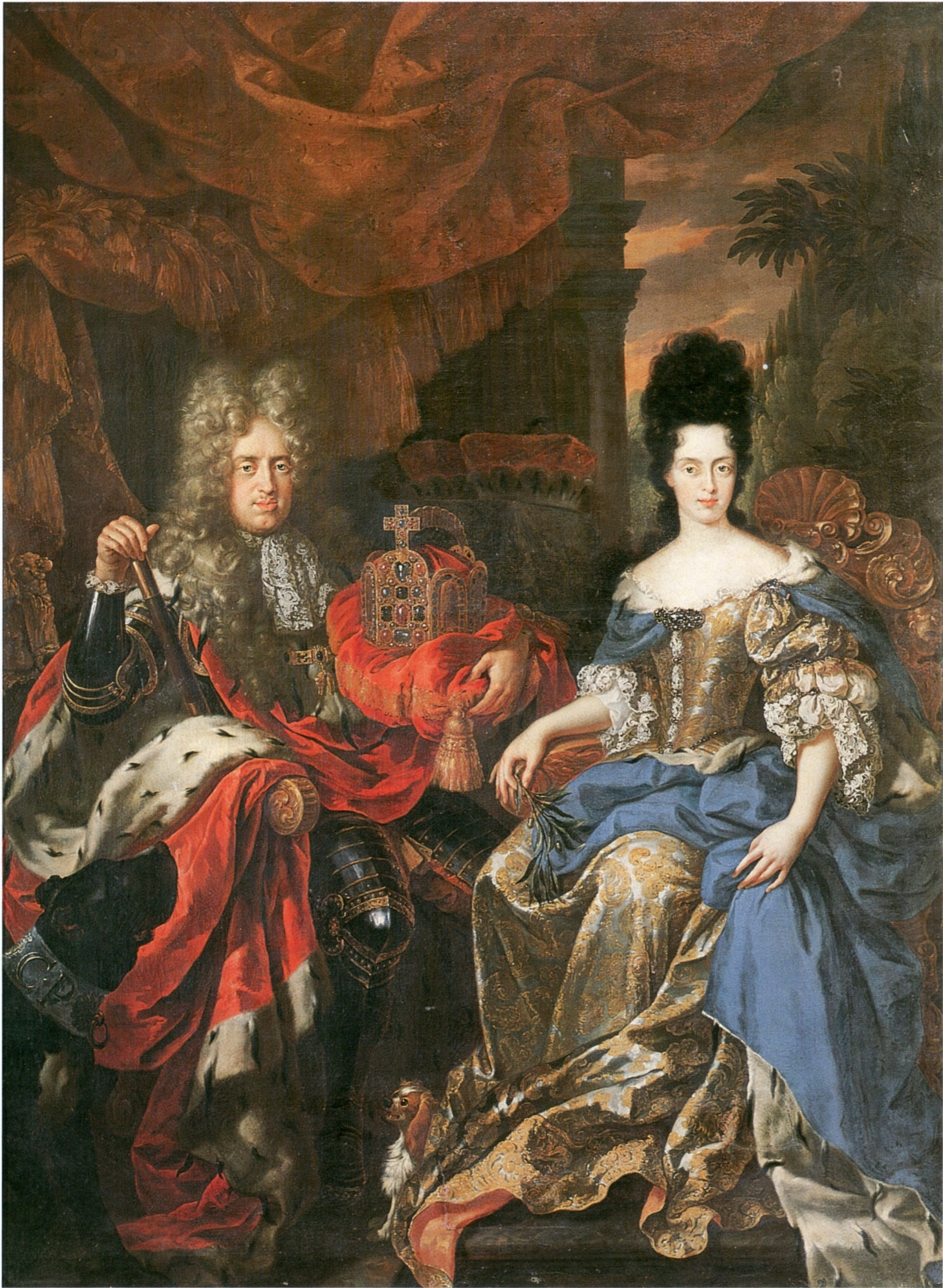
Anna Maria Luisa and her husband, Johann Wilhelm, Elector Palatine, from a painting after Jan Frans van Douven, 1708

Cosimo III wished to alter the male-only Tuscan line of succession so as to allow the accession of his daughter, Anna Maria Luisa, in the event of a male-line succession failure. But his plan was met with fierce opposition from the European powers. Charles VI, Holy Roman Emperor, Tuscany's nominal feudal over-lord, subscribed, but only if he should succeed her. Cosimo and she were at odds with the proposal. Without a concord in sight, the "Tuscan question" became dormant.

Some years later, as the question of the succession became more urgent, Cardinal Francesco Maria de' Medici, Cosimo III's brother, was released from his vows and coerced into marrying Vincenzo Gonzaga, Duke of Guastalla's elder daughter, Eleanor, in 1709. The Electress urged him to care for his health and "give us the consolation of a little prince." However, two years later, he died without issue, taking with him any hope of an heir.

Following the death of his heir apparent, Ferdinando, in 1713, Cosimo deposited a bill in the Senate, Tuscany's titular legislature, promulgating that if Cosimo and his new heir apparent, Gian Gastone, were to predecease the Electress, she would ascend the throne. Charles VI was furious; he replied that the grand duchy was an imperial fief and therefore he alone possessed the prerogative to alter the laws of succession. To complicate things further, Elisabeth Farnese, heiress of the Duchy of Parma, the second wife of Philip V of Spain, as a great-granddaughter of Margherita de' Medici, exercised a claim to Tuscany. In May 1716, Charles VI, who constantly changed his stance on the issue, told Florence that the Electress's succession was unquestioned, but added that Austria and Tuscany must soon reach an agreement regarding which royal house was to follow the Medici.

In June 1717, Cosimo declared his wish that the House of Este should succeed the Electress. Charles VI had previously offered the Grand Duke territorial compensation—in the form of the State of Presidi—if he chose quickly, but reneged. In 1718, Charles VI repudiated Cosimo's decision, declaring a union of Tuscany and Modena (the Este lands) unacceptable. Hereafter, a stalemate existed between them.

=== Return to Florence ===
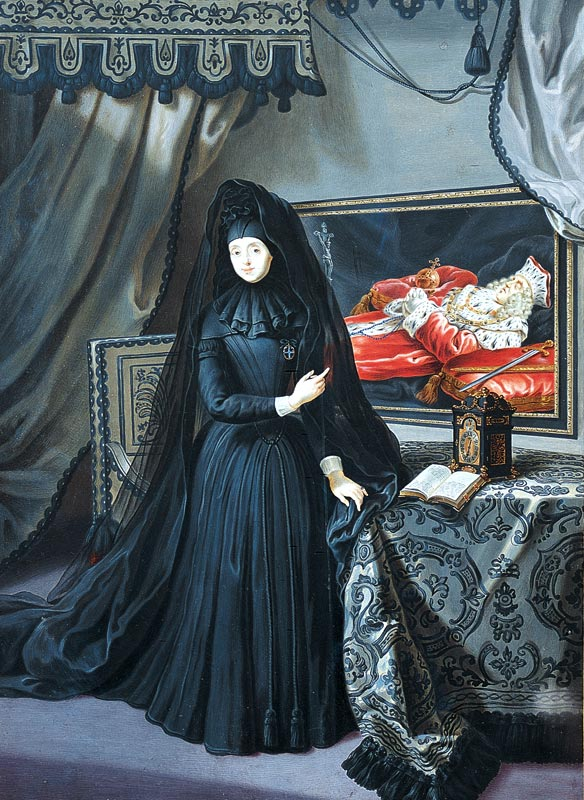
Anna Maria Luisa in The Electress Palatine in mourning dress by Jan Frans van Douven, 1717. She points to the portrait of Johann Wilhelm's remains, adorned with the Palatine regalia, in the milieu.

The Elector Palatine died in June 1716. His widow, Anna Maria Luisa, returned to Florence in October 1717. Dowager Grand Princess Violante Beatrice, her brother Ferdinando's widow, and Anna Maria Luisa did not enjoy an amiable relationship. Upon hearing of Anna Maria Luisa's intention to return, Violante Beatrice prepared to depart for Munich, her brother's capital, but Gian Gastone wished her to stay, so she did. To keep the two ladies from quarrelling over precedence, Cosimo III defined Violante Beatrice's status just before the Electress's arrival by appointing her Governess of Siena.

On 4 April 1718 Great Britain, France and the Dutch Republic (and later Austria) selected Infante Charles of Spain, the elder child of Elisabeth Farnese and Philip V of Spain, as the Tuscan heir (with no mention of Anna Maria Luisa). By 1722, the Electress was not even acknowledged as heiress, and Cosimo was reduced to a spectator at the conferences for Tuscany's future. In the midst of this, Marguerite Louise, Anna Maria Luisa's mother, died. Instead of willing her valuables to her children, as prescribed by the 1674 agreement, they went to the Princess of Epinoy, a distant relative.

On 25 October 1723, six days before his death, Cosimo III distributed a final proclamation commanding that Tuscany shall stay independent; Anna Maria Luisa shall succeed uninhibited after Gian Gastone; the Grand Duke reserves the right to choose his successor. Unfortunately for Cosimo, Europe completely ignored it. Gian Gastone, now the Grand Duke, and Anna Maria Luisa were not on good terms. He despised the Electress for engineering his unhappy marriage with Anna Maria Franziska of Saxe-Lauenburg, while she detested his liberal policies: he repealed all of his father's anti-Semitic statutes and revelled in upsetting her. Consequently, the Electress was compelled to abandon her apartment in the left wing of the Palazzo Pitti, for the Villa La Quiete. She refurbished La Quiete's house and gardens with the assistance of Sebastiano Rapi, the gardener of the Boboli Gardens, and the architects Giovanni Battista Foggini and Paolo Giovanozzi. In the period 1722–1725, the Electress embellished the villa further by commissioning twelve statues of various religious figures.

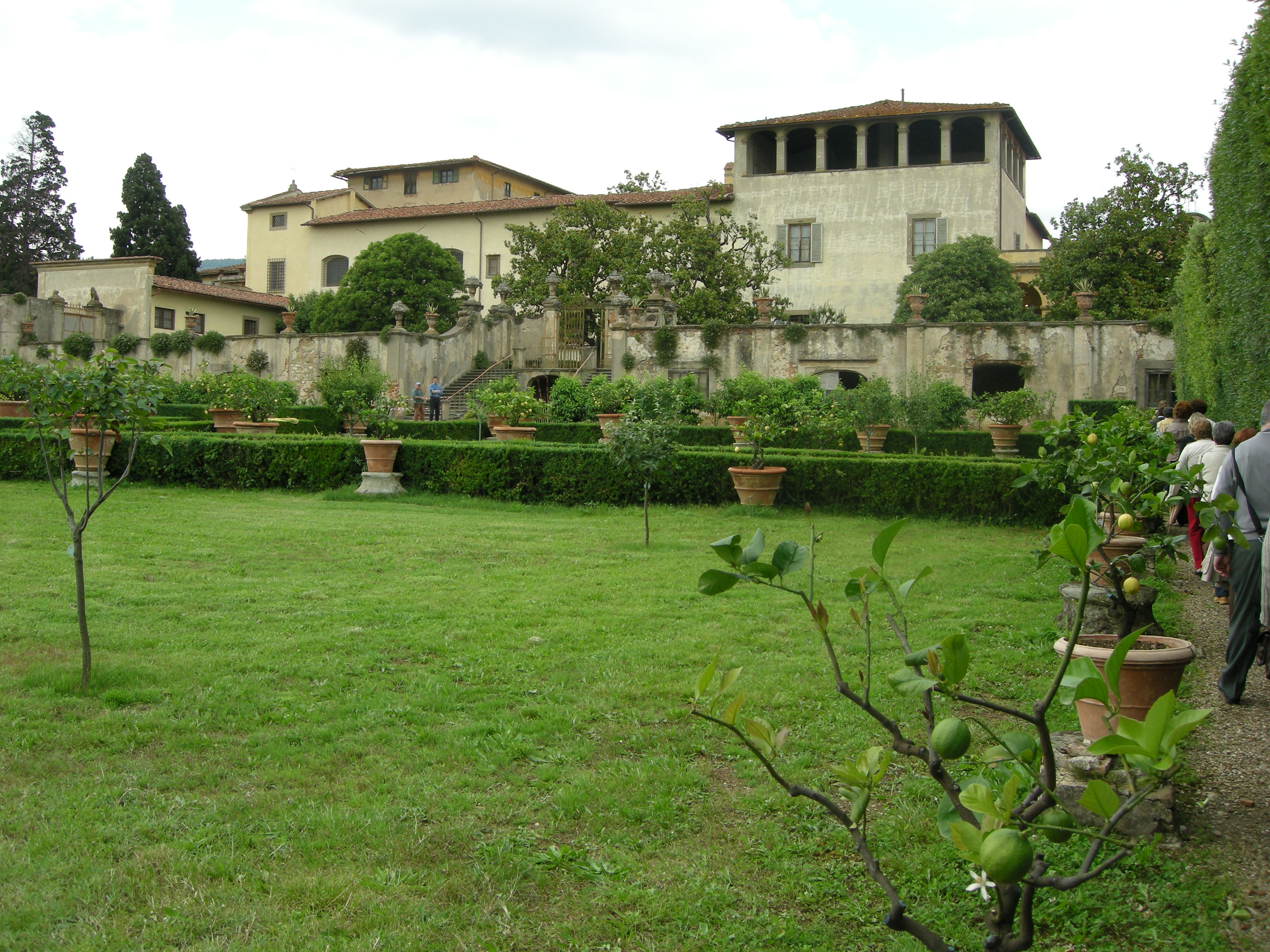
The Villa la Quiete in 2008. The villa served as Anna Maria Luisa's residence for the duration of the reign of her brother, Gian Gastone.

In spite of their mutual dislike, the Electress and Violante Beatrice attempted to improve Gian Gastone's poor public image together. Rumours abounded that the Grand Duke had died; it was a rarity for the public to see him. To dispel the said rumours, the Electress compelled him to make an appearance—his last one—in 1729, on the feast day of the patron saint of Florence, John the Baptist. The Ruspanti, Gian Gastone's morally corrupt entourage, hated the Electress; and she, them. Violante Beatrice tried to withdraw the Grand Duke from their sphere of influence by organising banquets. His conduct at these literally sent those in attendance scrambling for their carriages: he vomited repeatedly into his napkin, belched and told rude jokes. These distractions ceased upon Violante Beatrice's death in 1731.

In 1736, during the War of the Polish Succession, Infante Charles was banished from Tuscany as part of a territorial swap, and Francis III of Lorraine was made heir in his stead. In January 1737, the Spanish troops, who had occupied Tuscany since 1731, withdrew; 6,000 Austrian soldiers took their place.

Gian Gastone died from "an accumulation of diseases" on 9 July 1737, surrounded by prelates and his sister. Anna Maria Luisa was offered a nominal regency by the Prince de Craon, the Grand Duke's envoy, until Francis III could arrive in Florence, but declined. At Gian Gastone's demise, all the House of Medici's allodial possessions, including £2,000,000 (Note: This is equivalent to £416 million in present day terms. UK CPI inflation numbers based on data available from Measuring Worth: UK CPI) liquid cash, a vast art collection, robes of state and lands in the former Duchy of Urbino, were conferred on Anna Maria Luisa. In regards to this, her most notable act was the Patto di Famiglia ("Family Pact"), signed on 31 October 1737. In collaboration with the Holy Roman Emperor and Francis of Lorraine, she willed all the personal property of the Medici's to the Tuscan state, provided that nothing was ever removed from Florence.

=== Death and legacy ===
The "Lorrainers," as the occupying forces were dubbed, were popularly loathed. The Viceroy, the Prince de Craon, whom the Electress disliked for his "vulgar" court, allowed the Electress to live undisturbed in her own wing of the Palazzo Pitti, living in virtual seclusion, only on occasion receiving a select-number of guests under a black dais in her silver-clad audience room. She occupied herself financing and overseeing the construction of the Cappella dei Principi, started in 1604 by Ferdinando I de' Medici, Grand Duke of Tuscany—to the tune of 1,000 crowns per week, and she donated much of her fortune to charity: £4,000 per annum. This is equivalent to £777,167 in present-day terms. On 18 February 1743, Anna Maria Luisa de' Medici, Dowager Electress Palatine, died of an "oppression on the breast". Sir Horace Mann, 1st Baronet, a British resident in Florence, recalled in a letter that "The common people are convinced she went off in a hurricane of wind; a most violent one began this morning and lasted for about two hours, and now the sun shines as bright as ever..." The royal line of the House of Medici became extinct with her death. Her will, having been completed just months before, according to Sir Horace Mann, left £500,000 (Note: This is equivalent to £104 million in present day terms. UK CPI inflation numbers based on data available from Measuring Worth: UK CPI) worth of jewellery to the Grand Duke Francis and her lands in the former Duchy of Urbino to the Marquis Rinuccini, her main executor and a minister under her father, Cosimo III. She was interred in the crypt that she helped to complete in San Lorenzo; although not entirely finished at the time of her death, her testament stipulated that part of the revenue of her estate should "be used to continue, finish and perfect...the said famous chapel San Lorenzo".

Anna Maria Luisa's single most enduring act was the Family Pact. It ensured that all the Medicean art and treasures collected over nearly three centuries of political ascendancy remained in Florence. Cynthia Miller Lawrence, an American art historian, argues that Anna Maria Luisa thus provisioned for Tuscany's future economy through tourism. Sixteen years after her death, the Uffizi Gallery, built by Cosimo the Great, the founder of the grand duchy, was made open to public viewing.

In 2012, after concern caused by the 1966 Flood of the Arno River, her bones were exhumed. A scientific examination found no traces of syphilis, which she had long been thought to have died from.

Styles of Anna Maria Luisa, Electress of the Palatinate
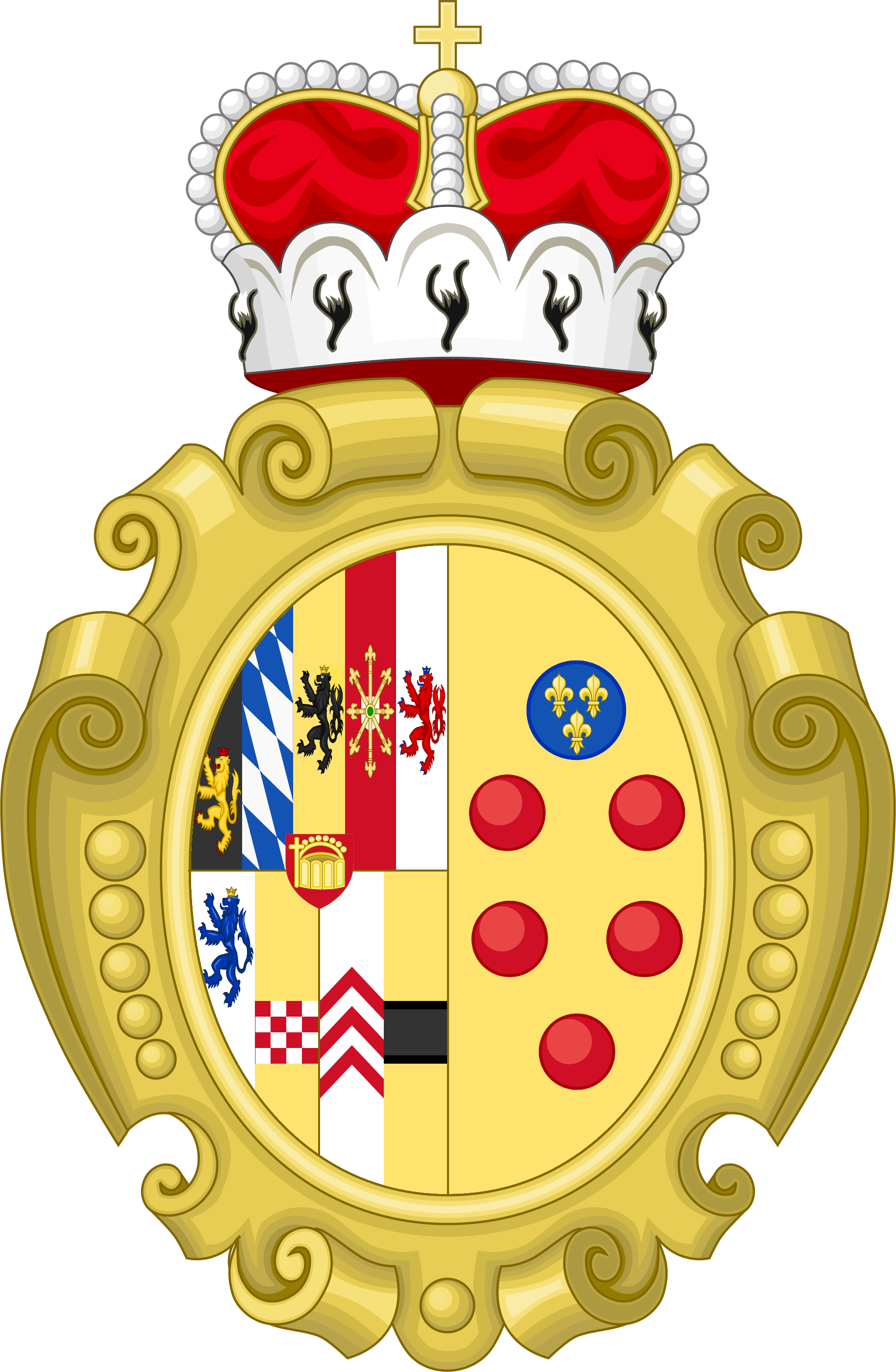
- Reference style: Her Serene Highness
- Spoken style: Your Serene Highness

Anna Maria Luisa de' Medici House of Medici Born: 11 August 1667 Died: 18 February 1743
German royalty
Preceded by Elizabeth Amelie of Hesse-Darmstadt	Electress consort of the Palatinate; 1691–1716	Succeeded by Elizabeth Augusta of Sulzbach
Preceded by Elizabeth Amelie of Hesse-Darmstadt	Duchess consort of Jülich, Cleve and Berg; 1691–1716	Succeeded by Elizabeth Augusta of Sulzbach
Preceded by Countess Alexander Otto von Velen	Countess consort of Megen; 1697–1716	Succeeded by Elizabeth Augusta of Sulzbach
Preceded by Theresa Kunegunda Sobieska	Duchess consort of the Upper-Palatinate; 1707–1714	Succeeded by Theresa Kunegunda Sobieska
Preceded by Theresa Kunegunda Sobieska	Duchess consort of Cham; 1707–1714	Succeeded by Theresa Kunegunda Sobieska
