= Ferdinando de' Medici, Grand Prince of Tuscany =

Grand Prince of Tuscany, patron of music (1663 – 1713)

Ferdinando de' Medici
- Grand Prince of Tuscany
- Born: 9 August 1663; Palazzo Pitti, Florence, Tuscany
- Died: 31 October 1713 (aged 50); Palazzo Pitti, Florence, Tuscany
- Burial: Basilica of San Lorenzo, Florence
- Spouse: Violante Beatrice of Bavaria
Names
- Ferdinando de' Medici
- House: Medici
- Father: Cosimo III de' Medici, Grand Duke of Tuscany
- Mother: Marguerite Louise d'Orléans

Ferdinando de' Medici (9 August 1663 – 31 October 1713) was the eldest son of Cosimo III de' Medici, Grand Duke of Tuscany, and Marguerite Louise d'Orléans. Ferdinando was heir to the Grand Duchy of Tuscany, with the title Grand Prince, from his father's accession in 1670 until his death in 1713. He is remembered today primarily as a patron of music. An excellent musician himself (sometimes called "the Orpheus of princes"), he attracted top musicians to Florence and thus made it an important musical center. Through his patronage of Bartolomeo Cristofori, Ferdinando made possible the invention of the piano.

== Life ==
Ferdinando was born in the Palazzo Pitti to Cosimo III de' Medici and his wife Marguerite Louise d'Orléans, a granddaughter of Maria de' Medici. When Ferdinando's parents separated in 1675, his mother (who disdained her husband only slightly more than Florence did) returned to Paris, where she was supposed to be confined to a monastery in Montmartre. Ferdinando became a rebellious youth, who disagreed intensely with his father on every subject. He was placed under the care of his grandmother, Vittoria della Rovere.

Ferdinando had a great affinity with his mother. He was a fine horseman, and a talented musician. He sang melodiously and played the harpsichord. He was a master in counterpoint, which he studied under Gianmaria Paliardi of Genoa, and in various bowed instruments, which he studied under Piero Salvetti. He was known for his ability to play a piece of music at sight and then repeat it flawlessly without looking at the music.

Aside from music, Ferdinando's other principal delight was in intimate liaisons and affairs, often with men. These included Petrillo, a musician famous for his beauty, and Cecchino, a Venetian castrato. Ferdinando's uncle Francesco Maria de' Medici, only three years older, was a strong influence on his life.

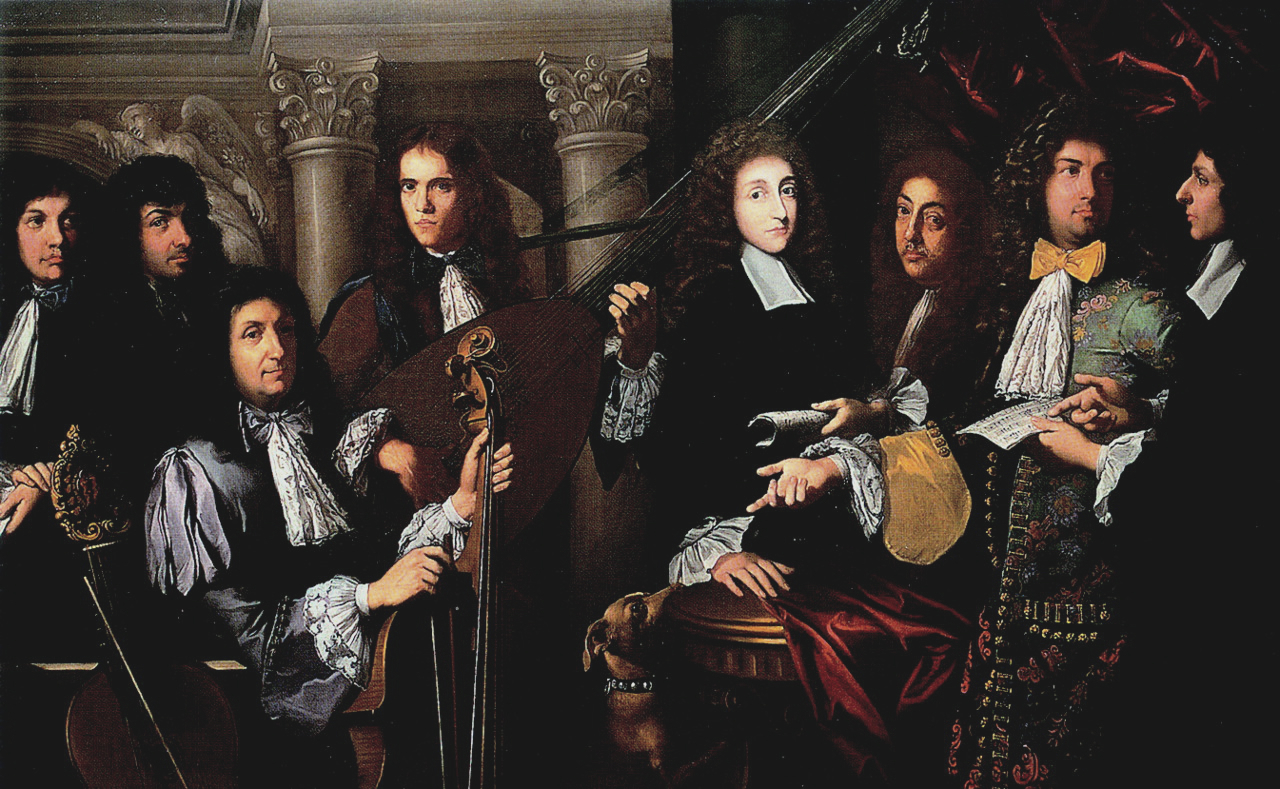
Anton Domenico Gabbiani, Prince Ferdinand and his musicians, 1685–90, Florence, Palatine Gallery of Palazzo Pitti

In 1689 Ferdinando married Violante of Bavaria, the daughter of the elector of Bavaria Ferdinand and Adelaide of Savoy. Although she also liked music and loved Ferdinando, her feelings were not requited and the marriage was unhappy and barren.

In 1696 Ferdinando sought recreation in Venice. He fell in love with a female vocalist called La Bambagia. It is presumed that during the Carnival of Venice, Ferdinando contracted syphilis. Vittoria Tarquini, called La Bombace, the wife of the concertmaster Jean-Baptiste Farinel became the mistress of Ferdinando. (She may have been a daughter of Robert Cambert and had an affair with Handel.)

By 1710 his health had begun to fail, and the annual operatic productions at Pratolino under his aegis (see below) ceased.

Ferdinando died in 1713, having fathered no children. His father continued to rule until 1723, and was succeeded on his death by Ferdinando's younger brother Gian Gastone, who likewise died childless. The lack of fecundity in the family ultimately led to a crisis: after Gian Gastone's death in 1737, the great powers of Europe reassigned the Grand Duchy to Francis, the husband of Maria Theresa, thus ending the independence of the Tuscan state.

== Legacy ==
Ferdinando's contemporary reputation rests on his role as patron of the arts. He was a connoisseur: he bought Madonnas by Raphael and Andrea del Sarto. He also patronised Giuseppe Maria Crespi, Anton Domenico Gabbiani and Sebastiano Ricci. Crespi was long employed by him at Pitti. Ferdinando organised the first public exhibition of fine arts to be held in Florence (1705, in the cloister of SS. Annunziata). Among poets he befriended Vincenzo da Filicaja and Benedetto Menzini. Scipione Maffei's dedication to him of the Giornale de' Letterati (1710) is a proof of Ferdinando's widespread reputation.

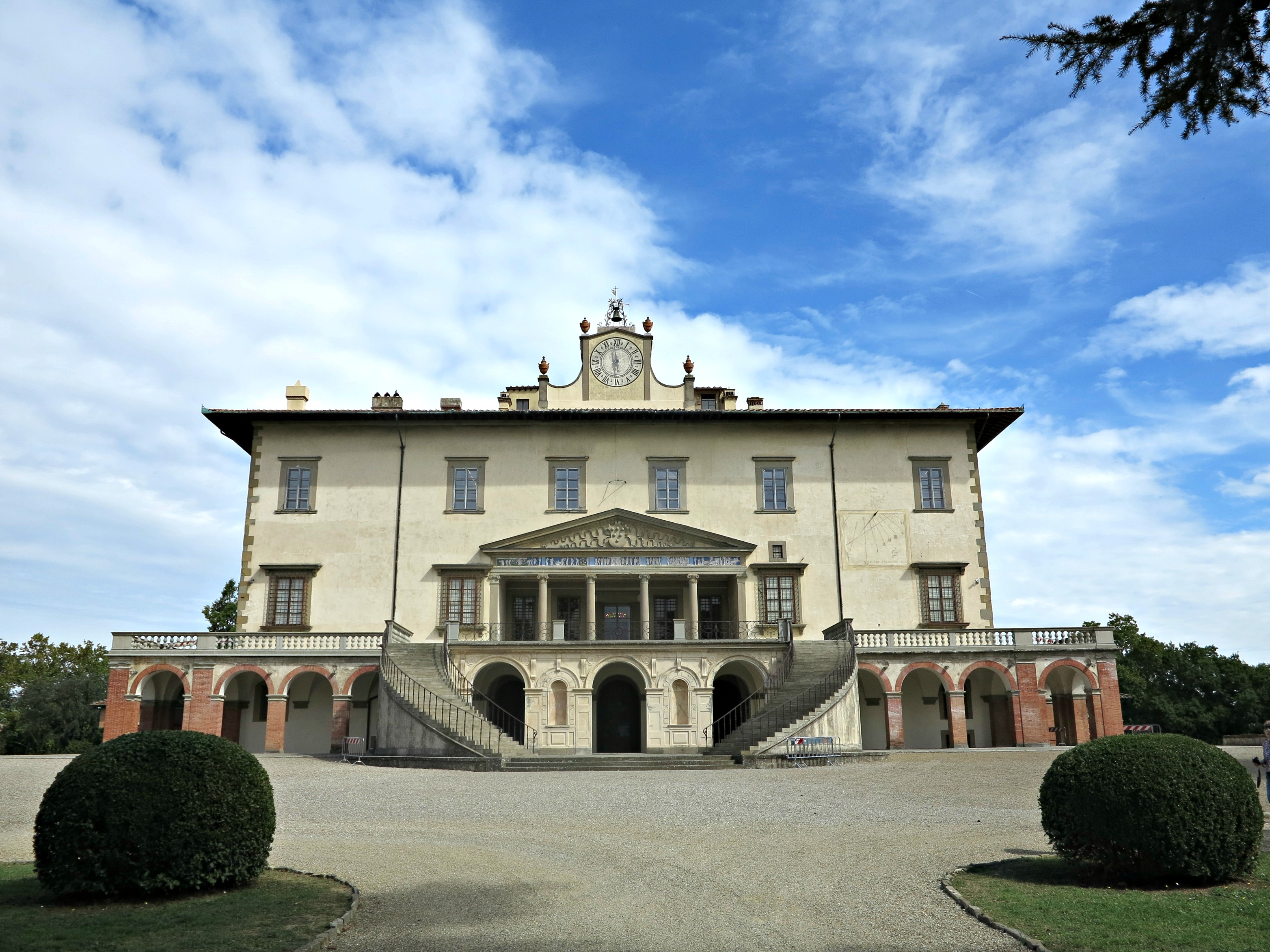
Villa at Poggio a Caiano

But it was as a patron of music that Ferdinando was most distinguished. He owned the Villa di Pratolino, located some 12 km (7.5 mi) outside Florence, (now called the Villa Demidov after a later owner, Anatoly Nikolaievich Demidov, 1st Prince of San Donato) which was home to many musical activities. From the years 1679 to 1710, there were annual operatic productions there, generally held in September. At first these were held in the grand salon, but starting in 1696 in a new theatre built on the third floor at Ferdinando's instigation, designed by Antonio Maria Ferri. Until 1686, the performances were supervised by Ferdinando's uncle Francesco Maria de' Medici; after that year (when Francesco Maria became a cardinal) they were Ferdinando's responsibility.

Among the musicians Ferdinando invited to Florence were Alessandro and Domenico Scarlatti, Giacomo Antonio Perti, Giovanni Legrenzi, Giovanni Pagliardi, Carlo Pollaroli, Giuseppe Maria Orlandini, Benedetto Marcello and Bernardo Pasquini. George Frederic Handel and Alessandro Scarlatti probably played on the instruments either in the Palazzo Pitti, or in the Medicean country villa of Poggio a Caiano or at Pratolino. Antonio Salvi, the family doctor, wrote several librettos, used by Handel for his opera. Handel's opera Rodrigo was first performed in Florence in 1708.

Ferdinando kept up correspondence with Alessandro Scarlatti about musical details in his operas, while producing five of his operas. In 1711 Antonio Vivaldi dedicated his L'estro Armonico to him. Handel and Corelli were well acquainted with Ferdinando's sister Anna Maria Luisa de' Medici; Corelli dedicated to her the Twelve concerti grossi, Op. 6. Handel would visit her also in Düsseldorf during continental trips.

=== Ferdinando, Cristofori, and the piano ===
Ferdinando's most permanent legacy was the result of his decision in 1688 to hire Bartolomeo Cristofori, a harpsichord builder from Padua, as his keeper of musical instruments. (Ferdinando's collection was a large one, with over 75 items). The Prince's support of Cristofori included the money and time Cristofori needed to pursue his interests as an inventor. Cristofori responded with a series of new instruments. The first two, the oval spinet (1690) and the spinettone, were probably intended for Ferdinando to play the continuo part in musical productions at Pratolino. The third instrument Cristofori invented for Ferdinando was the piano, which spread slowly at first (see Fortepiano) but ultimately became one of the most important of all musical instruments. The invention of the piano is believed to have occurred in about 1700; Cristofori built several more pianos for Ferdinando during the remainder of the Prince's lifetime.

== Gallery ==
Arms of the grand prince

Grand Prince Ferdinando de Medici – Giovanni Battista Foggini (1683) Metropolitan Museum of Art, New York City

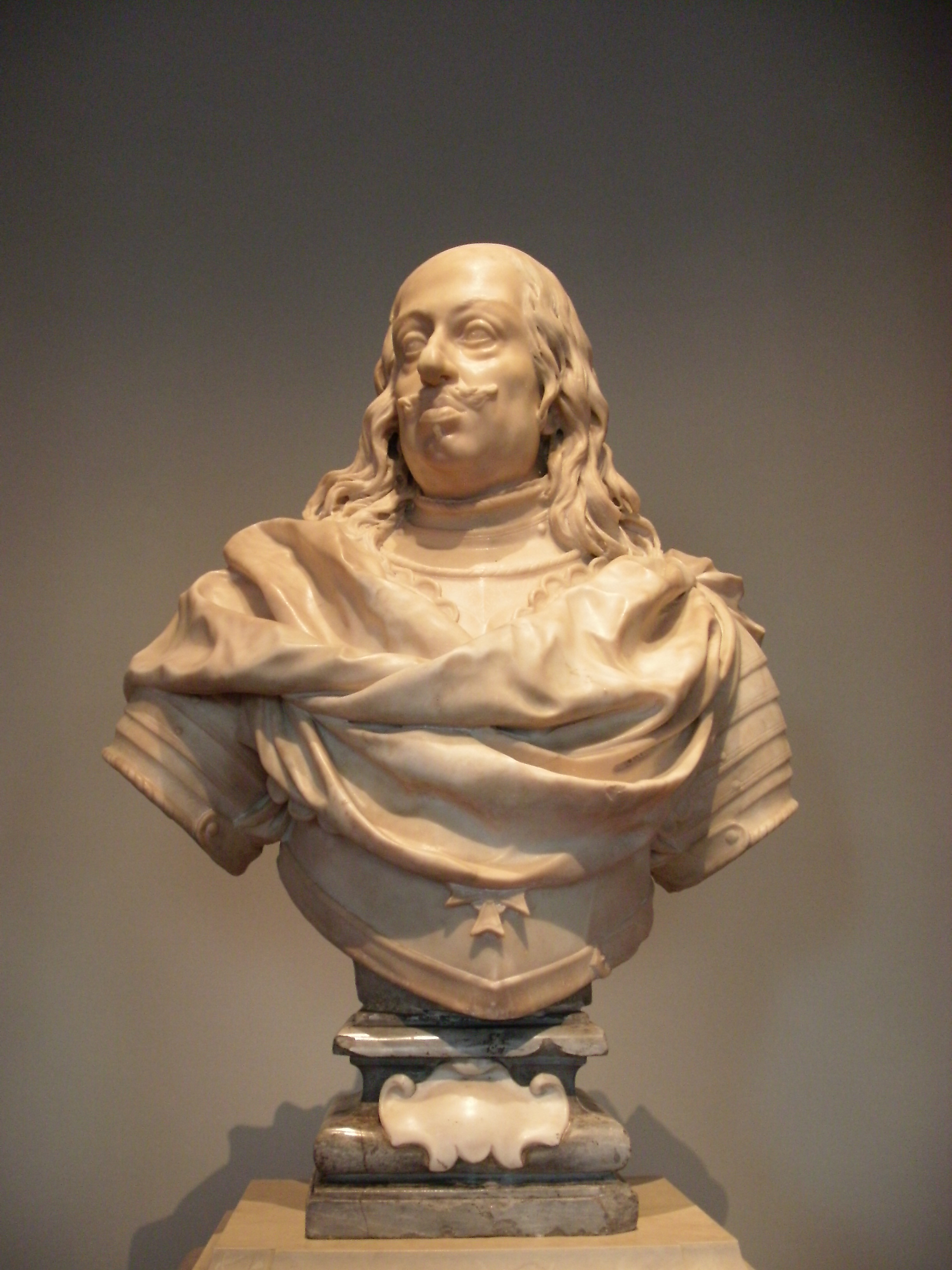
Ferdinando II de' Medici, Grand Duke of Tuscany – Giovanni Battista Foggini (1690) National Gallery of Art, Washington, DC

== Ancestors ==
Ancestors of Ferdinando de' Medici, Grand Prince of Tuscany

8. Cosimo II de' Medici, Grand Duke of Tuscany
4. Ferdinando II de' Medici, Grand Duke of Tuscany
9. Maria Magdalena of Austria
2. Cosimo III de' Medici, Grand Duke of Tuscany
10. Federico Ubaldo della Rovere, Duke of Urbino
5. Vittoria della Rovere
11. Claudia de' Medici
1. Ferdinando de' Medici, Grand Prince of Tuscany
12. Henry IV of France
6. Gaston, Duke of Orléans
13. Marie de' Medici
3. Marguerite Louise of Orléans
14. Francis II, Duke of Lorraine
7. Marguerite of Lorraine
15. Christina of Salm
