= Violante Beatrice of Bavaria =

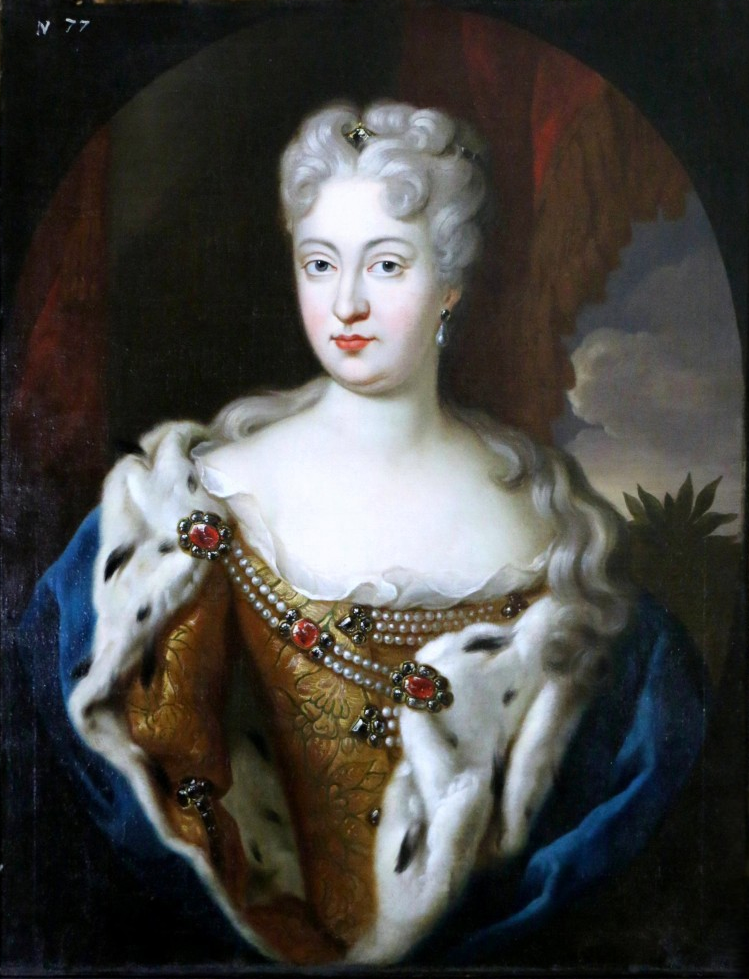
- Portrait by Georg Desmarées

Governor of Siena
- Tenure: 12 April 1717 – 30 May 1731
- Born: Duchess Violante Beatrice of Bavaria; 23 January 1673; Nymphenburg Palace, Munich, Bavaria, Holy Roman Empire
- Died: 30 May 1731 (aged 58); Palazzo Pitti, Florence, Tuscany
- Burial: Convent of Saint Teresa, Florence, Tuscany
- Spouse: Ferdinando de' Medici (m. 1689; died 1713)
Names
- Violante Beatrix
- House: Wittelsbach
- Father: Ferdinand Maria, Elector of Bavaria
- Mother: Henriette Adelaide of Savoy

Violante Beatrice of Bavaria (Violante Beatrix; 23 January 1673 – 30 May 1731) was Grand Princess of Tuscany as the wife of Ferdinando de' Medici, Grand Prince of Tuscany and Governor of Siena from 1717 until her death. Born a Duchess of Bavaria, the youngest child of Elector Ferdinand Maria, she married the heir to the Tuscan throne, Ferdinando de' Medici, in 1689. Violante Beatrice loved him but Ferdinando did not return her affection, declaring her too ugly and too dull. Her brother-in-law, Prince Gian Gastone, befriended her out of sympathy, a friendship that lasted until Violante Beatrice's demise.

Grand Prince Ferdinando died from syphilis in 1713, leaving his childless widow without purpose at the Tuscan court. Upon the return of the Electress Anna Maria Luisa de' Medici, daughter of the then reigning Cosimo III, thus Violante Beatrice's sister-in-law, the Dowager Grand Princess contemplated retiring to her brother's court at Munich; however, Gian Gastone convinced her to stay, and Cosimo III appointed her Governor of Siena, where she then resided. As Governor, she formally defined the boundaries, names and number of Sienese Contrade — akin to administrative divisions — in 1729.

During Grand Duke Gian Gastone's rule, the Governor was responsible for formal court audiences. Violante Beatrice, in collaboration with the Electress Anna Maria Luisa, attempted to withdraw Gian Gastone from the Ruspanti, his salacious entourage, by arranging banquets and public appearances. Gian Gastone, however, was immune to these approaches and spent the last eight years of his reign confined to bed, entertained by the myriad Ruspanti.

== Childhood and marriage ==
Violante Beatrice, the youngest child of the Elector of Bavaria, Ferdinand Maria, and Henriette Adelaide of Savoy, was born on 23 January 1673 in Munich, the capital of Bavaria. Her siblings were Maria Anna Victoria, Dauphine of France, Elector Maximilian II and Joseph Clemens, Archbishop of Cologne.

Grand Duke Cosimo III of Tuscany in 1688 sought Violante Beatrice as a prestigious bride — Bavaria was one of the most powerful states of the Holy Roman Empire — for his elder son and heir, Ferdinando, Grand Prince of Tuscany. As Cosimo's father, Ferdinando II, had embroiled Elector Ferdinand Maria in an abortive financial venture costing him 450,000 ungheri worth of gold, relations between Munich and Florence were sour.

In order to acquire Violante Beatrice's hand for the Grand Prince, Cosimo was obliged to reimburse Ferdinand Maria's son Maximilian II. With this obstacle surmounted, the marriage contract was signed on 24 May 1688, granting Violante Beatrice a dowry of 400,000 thalers in cash and the same amount in jewellery. She married the Grand Prince by proxy in Munich on 21 November 1688 and was married in person on 9 January 1689. The wedding reception was held at the Palazzo Medici Riccardi in Florence. The new Grand Princess was instantly enamoured with the bridegroom, in spite of the fact he loathed her. Cosimo III, however, could not find fault in his daughter-in-law, saying, "I have never known, nor do I think the world can produce, a disposition so perfect".

== Grand Princess ==
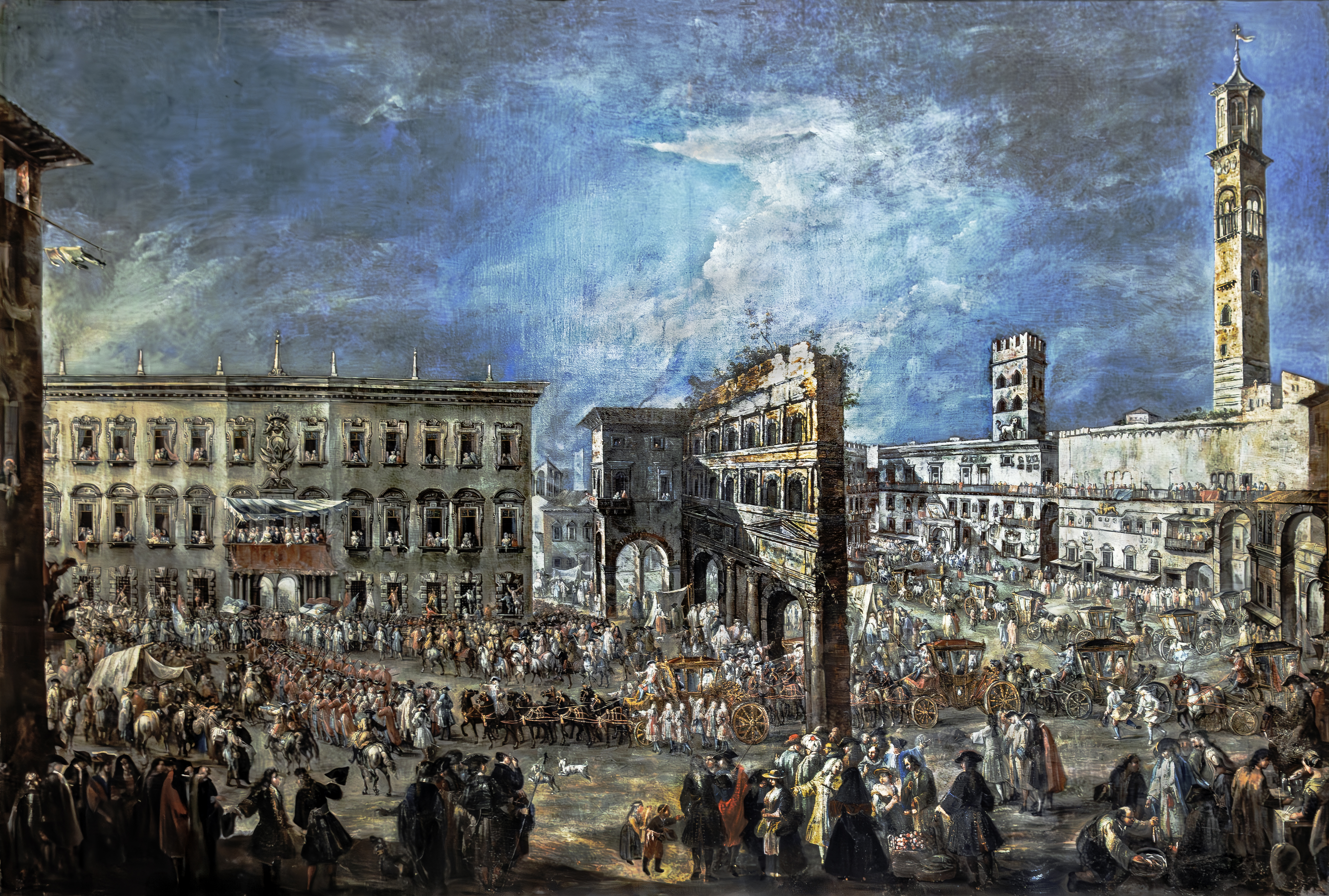
Violante Beatrice of Bavaria Entrance to Verona by Antonio Stom - Mocenigo Museum Venice

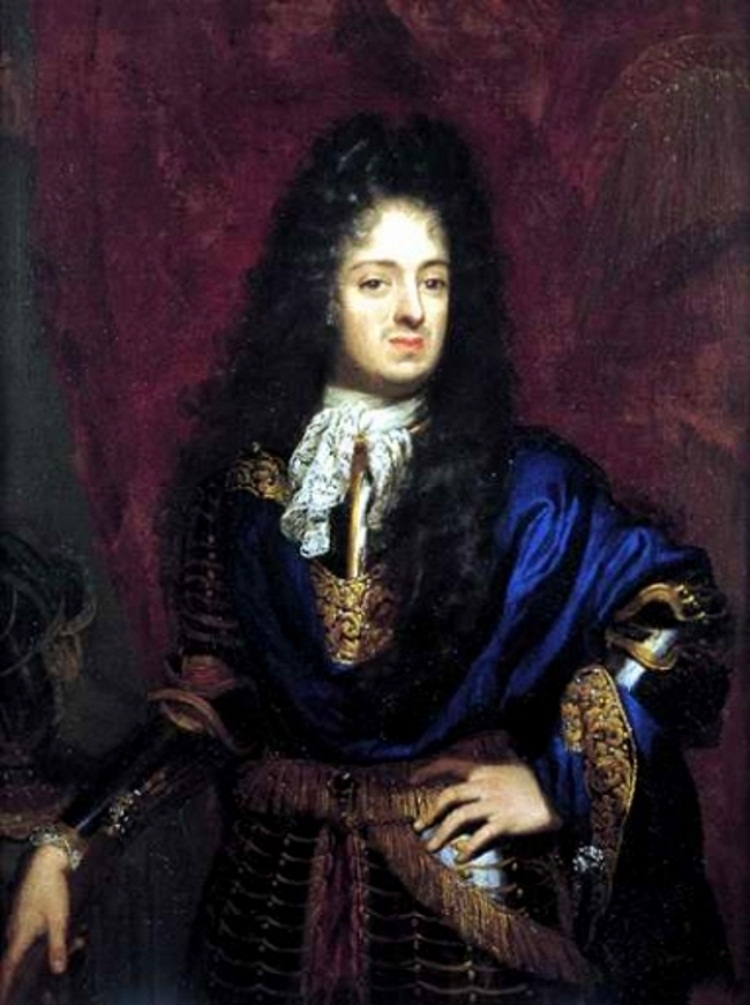
The Grand Prince Ferdinando, Violante Beatrice's husband, by Niccolò Cassana, 1687

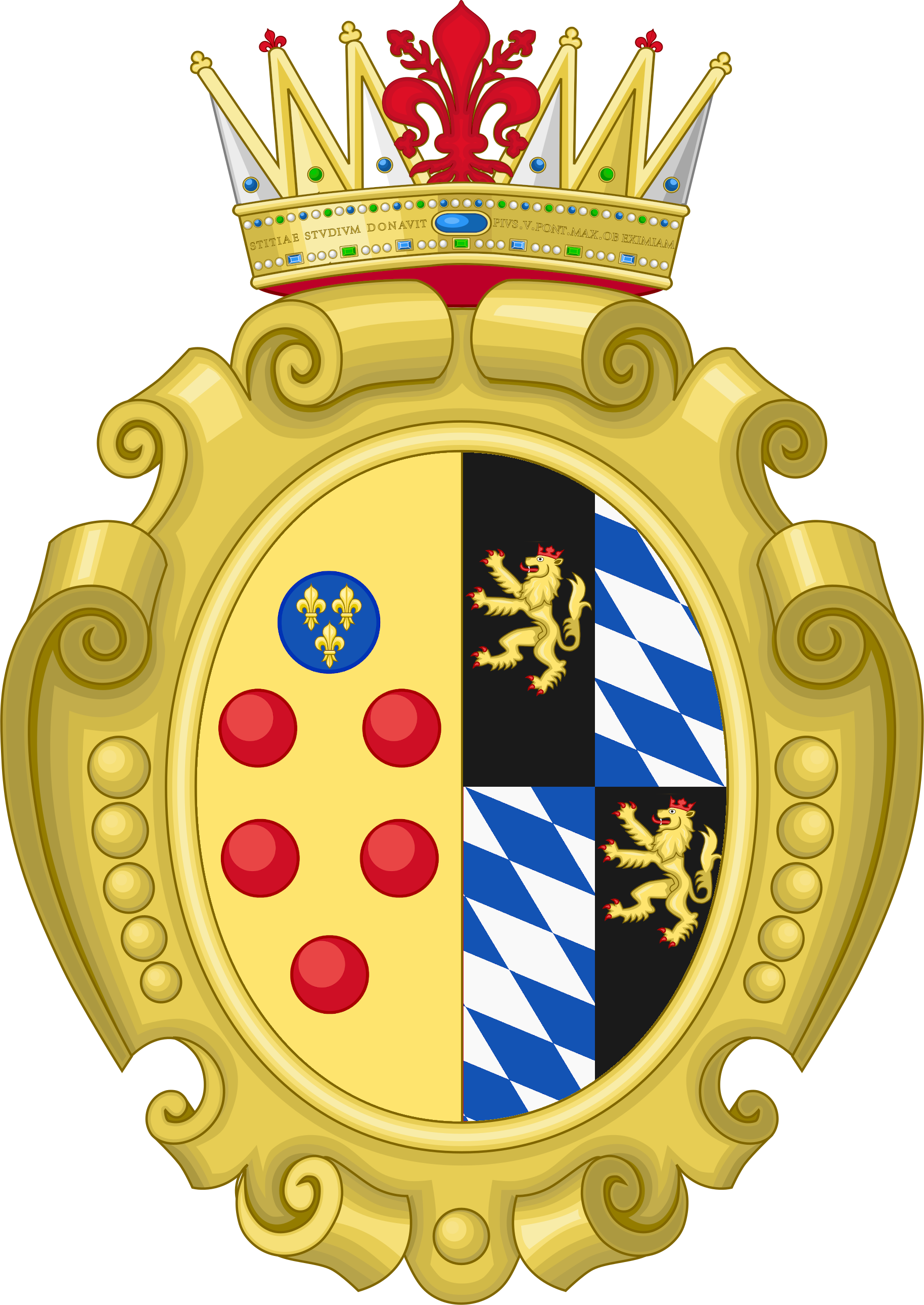
Arms of Violante Beatrice as Grand Princess of Tuscany

The grand princely couple's lack of offspring after six years of marriage perturbed the Grand Duke. Consequently, much to the Grand Princess's mortification, he commissioned three days' religious observance to remedy their lack of children in April 1694. Any hopes of an heir were dashed when Ferdinando contracted, in 1696, syphilis during the Carnival of Venice, a disease to which he succumbed seventeen years later. The Grand Princess, meanwhile, fell victim to a state of melancholy, which did not escape the notice of her brother-in-law, Prince Gian Gastone, who befriended her as a result. Violante Beatrice rarely alluded to her emotional pain in conversation, but, on one documented occasion, in the presence of her ladies, branded Ferdinando's lover Cecchino de Castris the focus of her woes. That Ferdinando often openly declared his wife "too dull and too ugly" only worsened matters.

The Grand Princess found herself, in 1702, in the middle of a protocolary spat between Tuscany and Spain. The Grand Duke sent an agent to the court of Philip V of Spain with the objective of procuring a license for the Grand Prince and Princess—who, hypothetically, acquired royal dignity with Cosimo III on 5 February 1691 from the Holy Roman Emperor, Leopold I's, diploma—to use the style Royal Highness in correspondence with Spain. Philip V initially deigned only to sanction his aunt Violante Beatrice's use; however, the agent, Pucci, eventually requisitioned full recognition.

King Philip V and Frederick IV of Denmark paid Violante Beatrice visits in 1703 and 1709, respectively. The former chose to ignore the other members of the Tuscan Royal Family and reluctantly deigned only speak to her. The latter, on the other hand, was taken with Violante, going as far as to refuse to leave the room while she was changing clothes.

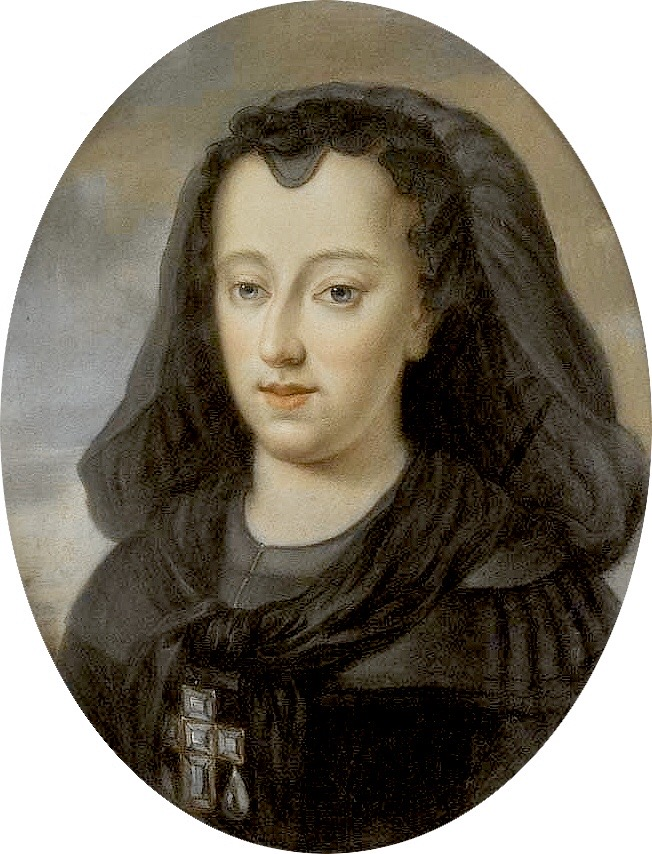
Violante Beatrice in mourning by Giovanna Fratellini, c. 1715

The Grand Prince, after much suffering, died from syphilis on 31 October 1713, sparking a succession crisis and leaving his wife a childless and therefore purposeless widow. The Dowager was so distraught that she had to be bled by doctors in order to calm her down. Cosimo III gave her a set of blue sapphires as a token of mourning. Violante Beatrice considered returning to her homeland when she caught wind of the Electress Anna Maria Luisa de' Medici's impending return. The two did not get along. Violante Beatrice, additionally, would be usurped as first-lady of Tuscany. To quell any future tiffs regarding precedence, Cosimo III appointed Violante Beatrice Governor of Siena, whose duties as such kept her away from the Tuscan court, and gave her possession of the Villa di Lappeggi, which became, in the words of historian Harold Acton, "a sort of literary academy". Here, she feted poets Lucchesi, Ghivanizzi and Morandi. Although precedence was laid out cognisant of Violante Beatrice's dignity, the Electress on several occasions disregarded it. Thus, Violante Beatrice refused to appear with her in public.

== Governor of Siena ==
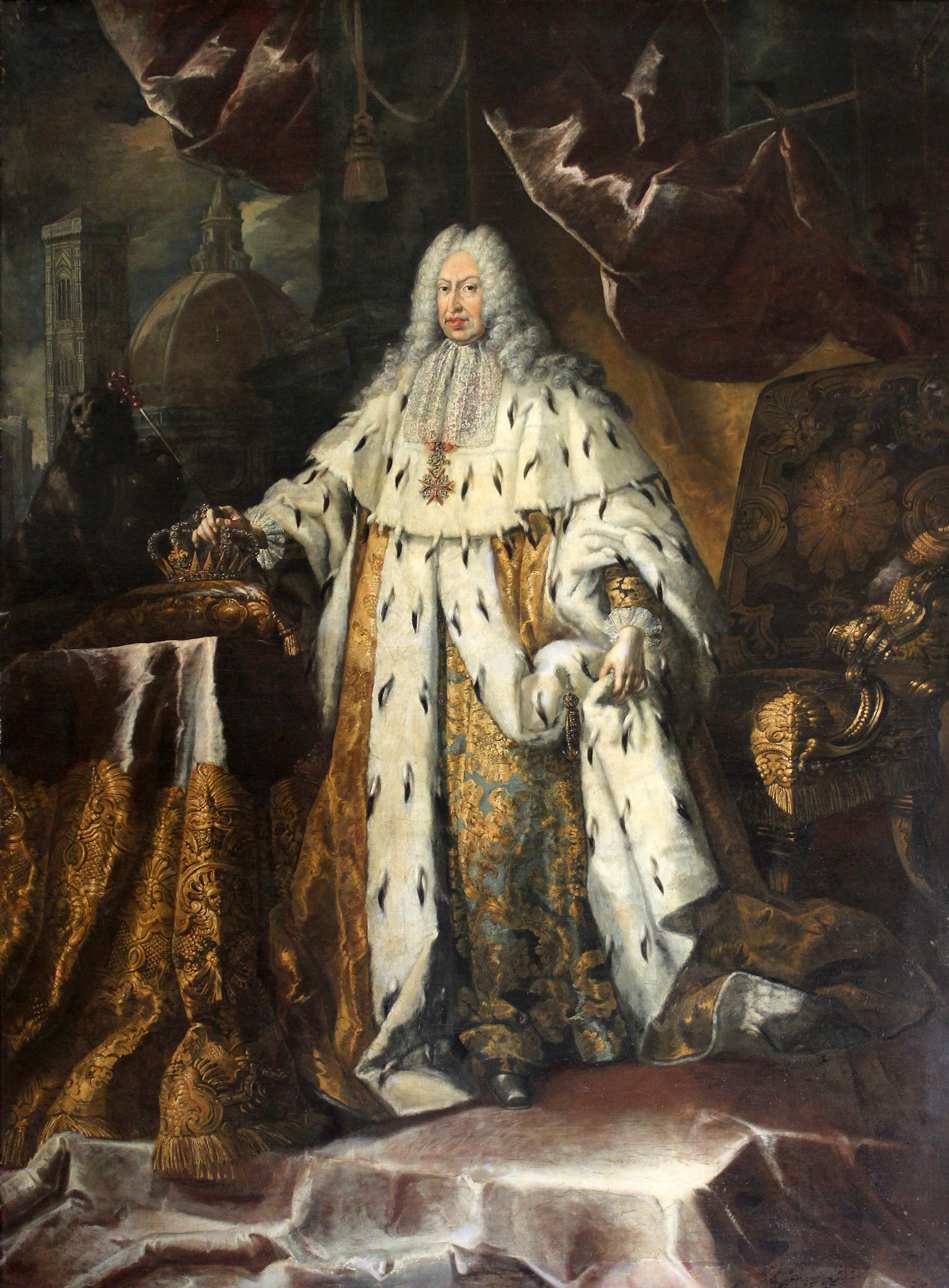
Grand Duke Gian Gastone, Violante's brother-in-law, by Franz Ferdinand Richter, 1737

The Governor entered her domain in April 1717, taking up residence in the city-centre. Violante Beatrice's most memorable act as Governor was the reorganisation of the Sienese Contrade — akin to administrative divisions — whose names, number and boundaries she formally defined which remain there to this day. The Grand Duke Cosimo III died on 31 October 1723; Gian Gastone ascended to the throne. He immediately recalled Violante Beatrice to Florence and banished his sister to the Villa La Quiete. Violante Beatrice dominated the royal court as Gian Gastone resigned his public duties to her, and literally chose to spend most of his time in bed. The "religious gloom" of Cosimo III gave way to a period of rejuvenation: Violante Beatrice instituted French fashions at court, compelled myriad Ecclesiastes to retire and patronised Siense poets Perfetti and Ballati. Violante Beatrice brought Perfetti to Rome in 1725 and stayed at the Palazzo Madama. During her time in the Papal States, she met Pope Benedict XIII, who found her so agreeable that he bestowed upon her the golden rose, a great mark of Papal favour.

Upon her return from Rome, Violante Beatrice and the Electress Anna Maria Luisa decided to do something about Gian Gastone's public image and the Ruspanti, his entourage. In order to distract him from the Ruspanti, Violante Beatrice threw banquets, to which she invited the foremost members of Tuscan society. The Grand Duke's behaviour, vomiting, belching and cracking rude jokes, literally sent the guests scrambling to leave. The Electress was more fortunate for her part. She succeeded in making Gian Gastone appear on Saint John the Baptist's day, 1729. However, during the ceremony, the Grand Duke became so intoxicated that he had to be dragged back to his palace, Palazzo Pitti, on a litter.

Just five months before the arrival of troops on behalf of Gian Gastone's Spanish heir, Violante Beatrice of Bavaria, Dowager Grand Princess of Tuscany, Governor of Siena, died. During the funeral procession, her hearse briefly paused before Palazzo Pitti, an action that incensed the Grand Duke, who ordered the hearse to move along in words a contemporary dubbed "unfit for the lowest of harlots, let alone for a gentle high-born princess". The bulk of Violante Beatrice's remains were interred in the Convent of Saint Teresa, Florence; her heart was placed in her husband's coffin in the Medicean necropolis, San Lorenzo. When in 1857 her sarcophagus was re-discovered, it bore the imperial stamp of Napoleon I of France, who had had it moved from the convent to San Lorenzo. On 26 February 1858, she was restored to the convent, brought there in the royal hearse.

== Bibliography ==
- Acton, Harold (1980). The Last Medici. London: Macmillan. ISBN 0-333-29315-0.
- Angesi, M.G. (2005).The Contest for Knowledge: Debates Over Women's Learning in Eighteenth-century Italy. Chicago: Chicago University Press. ISBN 0-226-01055-4.
- Hale, J.R. (1977). Florence and the Medici. London: Orion. ISBN 1-84212-456-0.
- Napier, Edward Henry (1846). Florentine History: from the Earliest Authentic Records to the Accession of Ferdinand the Third: Volume V. London: Moxon.
- Parsons, Gerald (2004). Siena, Civil Religion and the Sienese. Farnham: Ashgate. ISBN 0-7546-1516-2.
- Strathern, Paul (2003). The Medici: Godfathers of the Renaissance. London: Vintage. ISBN 978-0-09-952297-3.
- Young, G.F. (1920). The Medici: Volume II. London: John Murray.
