= Cosimo III de' Medici =

Grand Duke of Tuscany from 1670 to 1723

Cosimo III
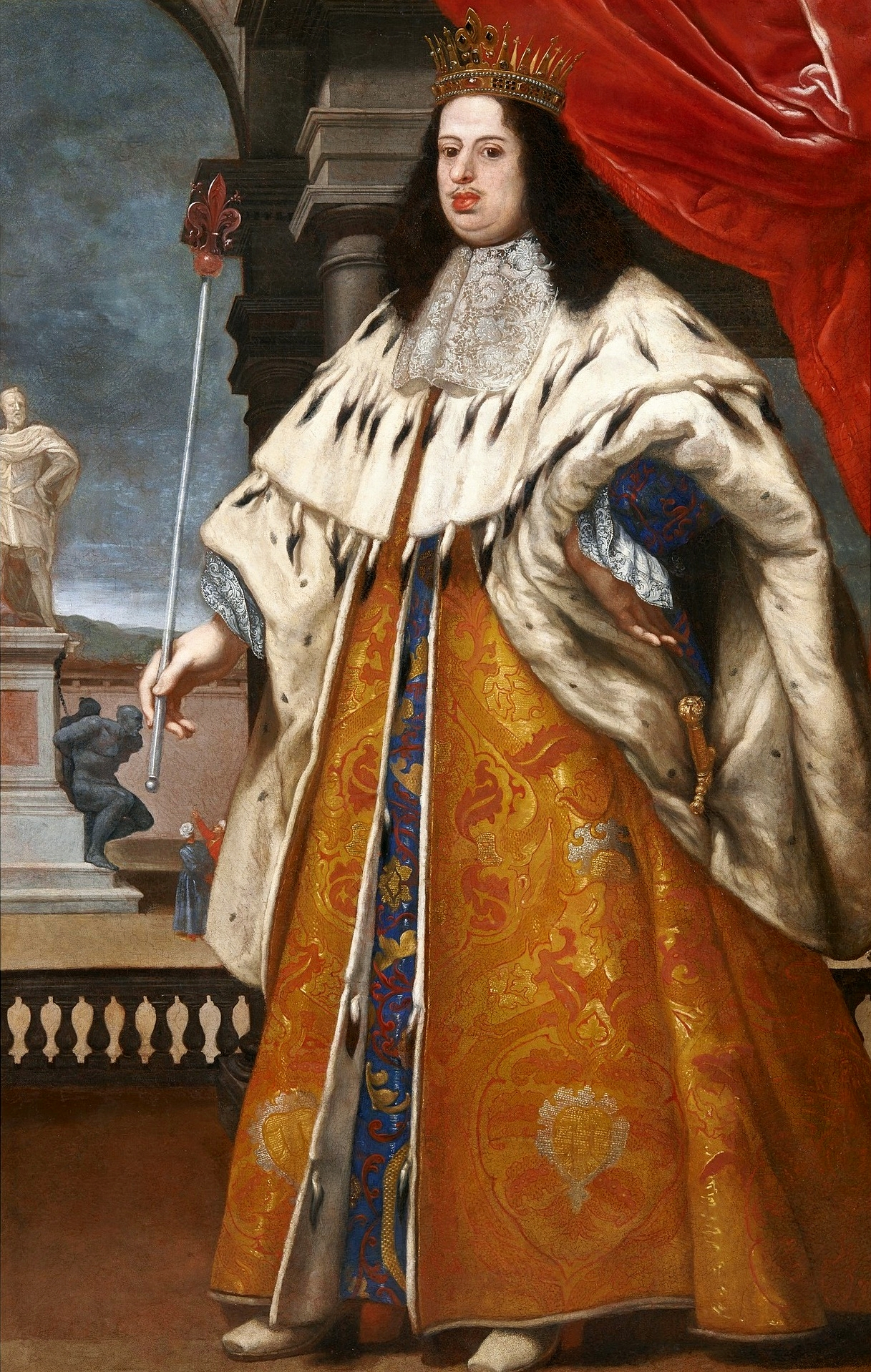
- Cosimo in granducal robes with Tuscan regalia by Baldassare Franceschini, 1676–77

Grand Duke of Tuscany
- Reign: 23 May 1670 – 31 October 1723
- Predecessor: Ferdinando II
- Successor: Gian Gastone I
- Born: 14 August 1642; Pitti Palace, Florence, Grand Duchy of Tuscany
- Died: 31 October 1723 (aged 81); Pitti Palace, Florence, Grand Duchy of Tuscany
- Burial: Basilica of San Lorenzo, Tuscany
- Spouse: Marguerite Louise d'Orléans
- Issue Detail: Ferdinando, Grand Prince of Tuscany; Anna Maria Luisa, Electress Palatine; Gian Gastone, Grand Duke of Tuscany
Names
- Cosimo de' Medici
- House: Medici
- Father: Ferdinando II de' Medici
- Mother: Vittoria della Rovere
- Religion: Catholicism

Cosimo III de' Medici (14 August 1642 – 31 October 1723) was Grand Duke of Tuscany from 1670 until his death in 1723, the sixth and penultimate from the House of Medici. He reigned from 1670 to 1723, and was the elder son of Grand Duke Ferdinando II. Cosimo's 53-year-long reign, the longest in Tuscan history, was marked by a series of laws that regulated prostitution and May celebrations. His reign also witnessed Tuscany's deterioration to previously unknown economic lows.

Cosimo III married Marguerite Louise d'Orléans, a cousin of Louis XIV. The marriage was solemnized by proxy in the King's Chapel at the Louvre, on 17 April 1661. It proved to be a very difficult marriage. Marguerite eventually abandoned Tuscany for the Convent of Montmartre. Together, they had three children: Ferdinando in 1663, Anna Maria Luisa, Electress Palatine, in 1667, and Gian Gastone I the last Medicean ruler of Tuscany, in 1671.

In later life, Cosimo III attempted to have his daughter recognised as the universal heiress of Tuscany, after his sons (who did not look like they would produce heirs), but Charles VI, Holy Roman Emperor, would not allow it because Tuscany was an imperial fief, and he felt he alone could alter the Tuscan laws of succession. In 1723, when Cosimo died, he was succeeded by his younger son. All Cosimo III's efforts to salvage the throne for his family foundered, and in 1737, upon the death of Gian Gastone, Tuscany passed to the House of Lorraine.

== Early life ==
=== Heir to the throne ===
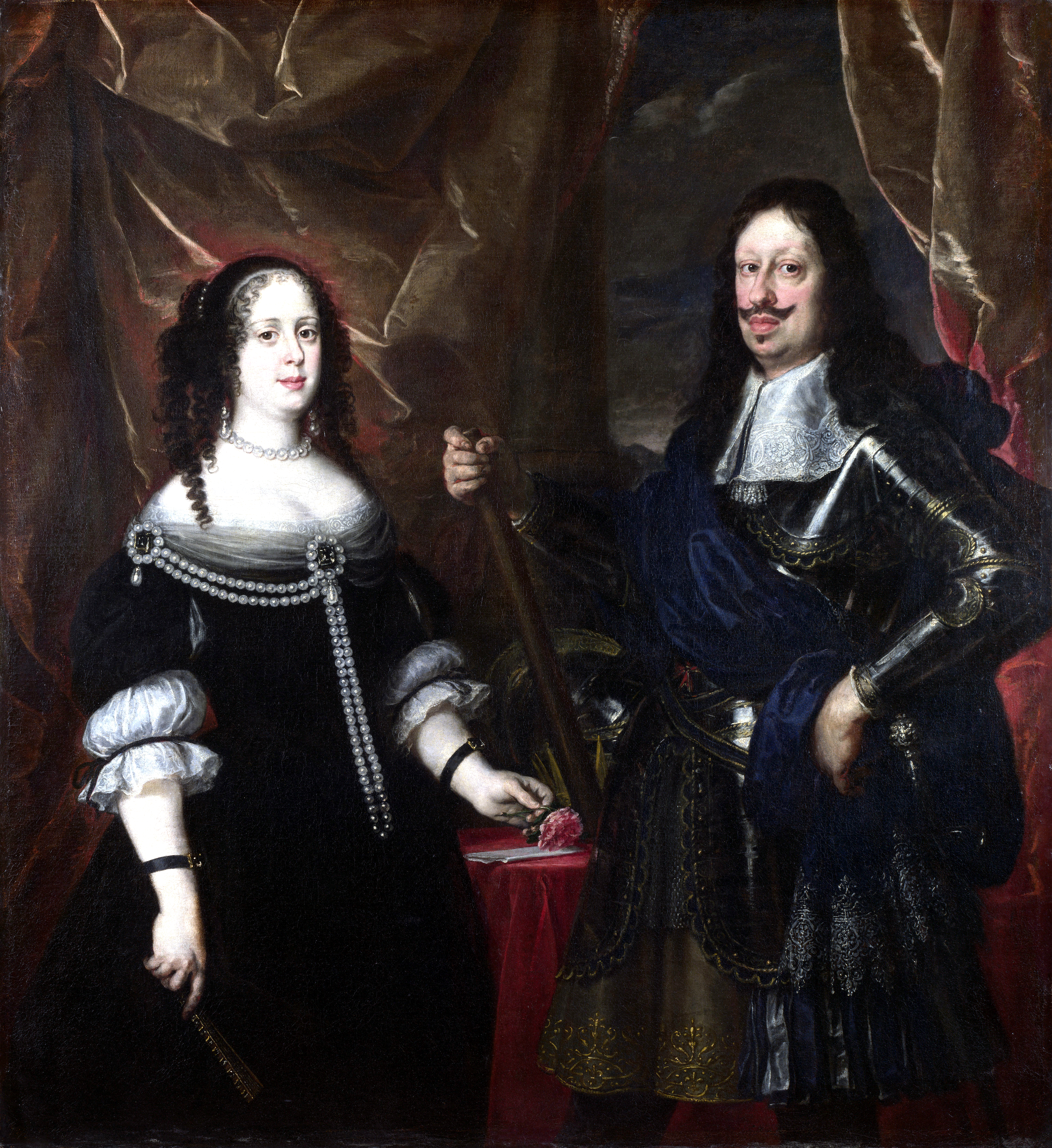
Ferdinando II de' Medici, Grand Duke of Tuscany, Cosimo III's father, and Vittoria Della Rovere, his mother, by Justus Sustermans

Cosimo de' Medici was born on 14 August 1642, the eldest surviving son of Vittoria della Rovere of Urbino, and Ferdinando II de' Medici, Grand Duke of Tuscany. Their previous two children had died shortly after birth. Although Grand Duke Ferdinando wanted to give his son the finest scientific education available, the pious Grand Duchess Vittoria opposed that wish, and got her way. Volunnio Bandinelli, a Sienese theologian, was appointed Cosimo's tutor. His character was similar to the Grand Duchess's.

As a youth, Cosimo revelled in sports. His uncle Gian Carlo once wrote to another family member with "news that should surprise you....The young prince [Cosimo] has killed a goose in mid-air." Cosimo, at the age of 11, killed five pigs with five shots. The Luchese ambassador highly praised the young Cosimo. His successor, however, described Cosimo as "melancholy". In his early youth, he was in love with a man named Petrillo, a singer. Their romance was discovered when Cosimo spontaneously hugged and kissed him in front of a tutor. Petrillo fled Florence, never to return. Cosimo's father knew of his homosexual nature and tried to force him to take a wife, as Cosimo presented the best possibility of begetting an heir. In 1687, he had a boyfriend in Venice, Cecchino, nicknamed de' Castris, because he was castrated.

By 1659, Cosimo had ceased smiling in public. He frequently visited places of religious worship and surrounded himself with friars and priests, worrying Grand Duke Ferdinando. Cosimo's only sibling, Francesco Maria de' Medici, the fruit of his parents' brief reconciliation, was born the next year.

=== Marriage ===
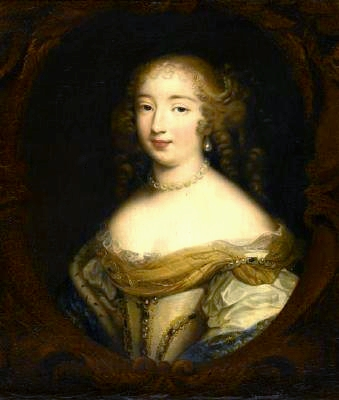
Marguerite Louise d'Orléans, Cosimo's wife, by Louis-Édouard Rioult

Marguerite Louise d'Orléans, a granddaughter of Henry IV of France, was married to Cosimo by proxy on 17 April 1661 at the Louvre Palace. She arrived in Tuscany on 12 June, disembarking at Livorno, and made her formal entry to Florence on 20 June to much pageantry. As a wedding gift, Grand Duke Ferdinando presented her with a pearl the "size of a small pigeon's egg."

The marriage was unhappy from the start. A few nights following the formal entry, Marguerite Louise demanded the Tuscan crown jewels for her own personal use; Cosimo refused. The jewels that she did manage to extract from Cosimo were almost smuggled out of Tuscany by her attendants but for the efforts of Ferdinando's agents. Marguerite Louise's extravagances perturbed Ferdinando because the Tuscan exchequer was nearly bankrupt; it was so empty that when the Wars of Castro mercenaries were paid for, the state could no longer afford to pay interest on government bonds. Accordingly, the interest rate was lowered by 0.75%. The economy, too, was so decrepit that barter trade became prevalent in rural marketplaces. In August 1663 Marguerite Louise delivered a boy: Ferdinando. Two more children followed: Anna Maria Luisa in 1667 and Gian Gastone in 1671.

Ferdinando beseeched Louis XIV to do something about his daughter-in-law's behaviour; he sent the Comte de Saint-Mesme. Marguerite Louise wanted to return to France, and Saint-Mesme sympathised with this, as did much of the French court, so he left without finding a solution to the heir's domestic disharmony, incensing both Ferdinando and Louis XIV. She humiliated Cosimo at every chance she got: she insisted on employing French cooks, as she feared the Medici would poison her. In September 1664 Marguerite Louise abandoned her apartments in the Pitti Palace. Cosimo moved her into Villa Lapeggi. Here, she was watched by forty soldiers, and six courtiers—appointed by Cosimo—had to follow her everywhere. The next year she reconciled with the grand ducal family, and gave birth to Anna Maria Luisa, future Electress Palatine, in August 1667. The delicate rapprochement that existed between Marguerite Louise and the rest of the family collapsed after Anna Maria Luisa's birth, when Marguerite Louise caught smallpox and decided to blame Cosimo for all her problems.

=== European travels ===
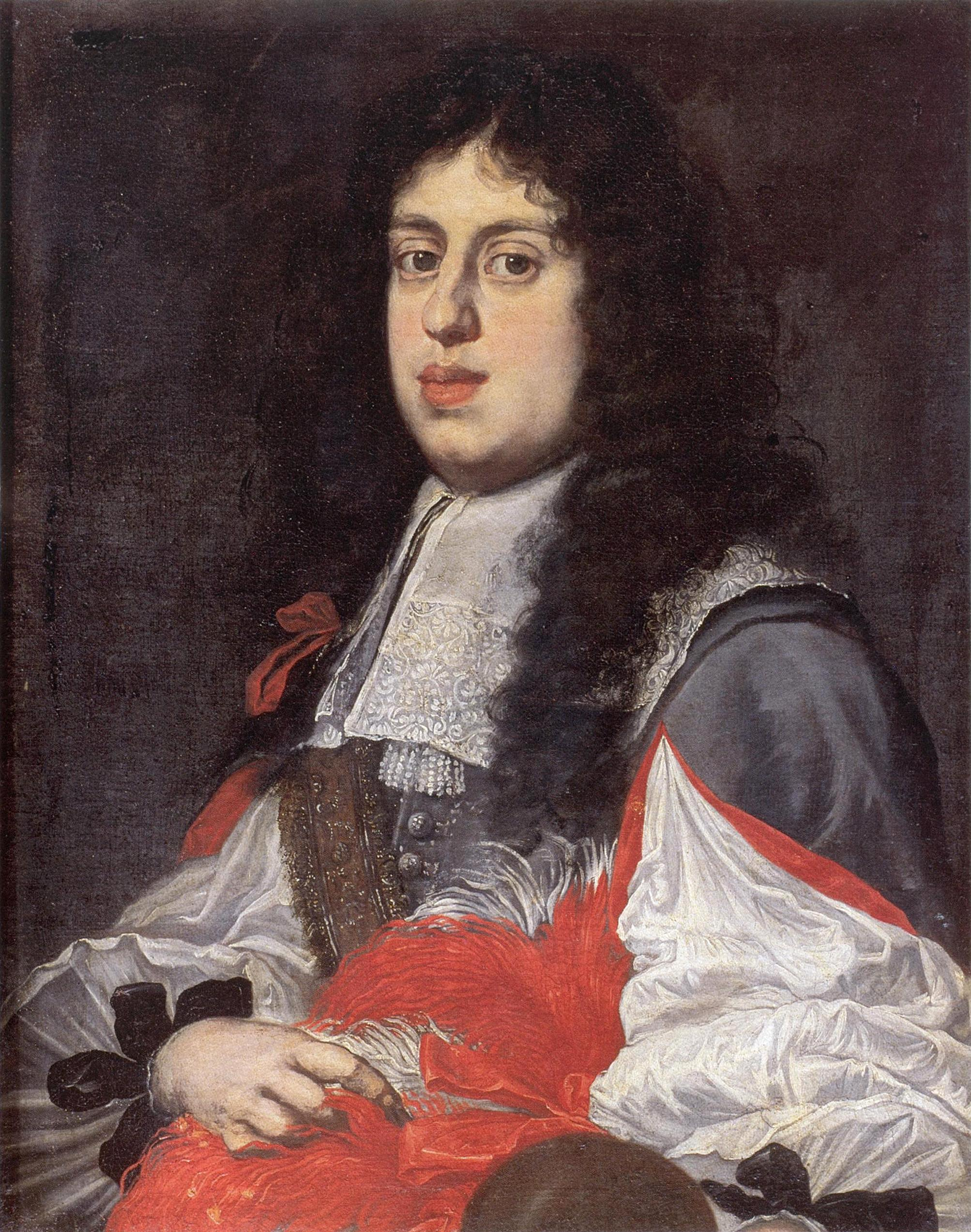
Cosimo around 1660, by Sustermans

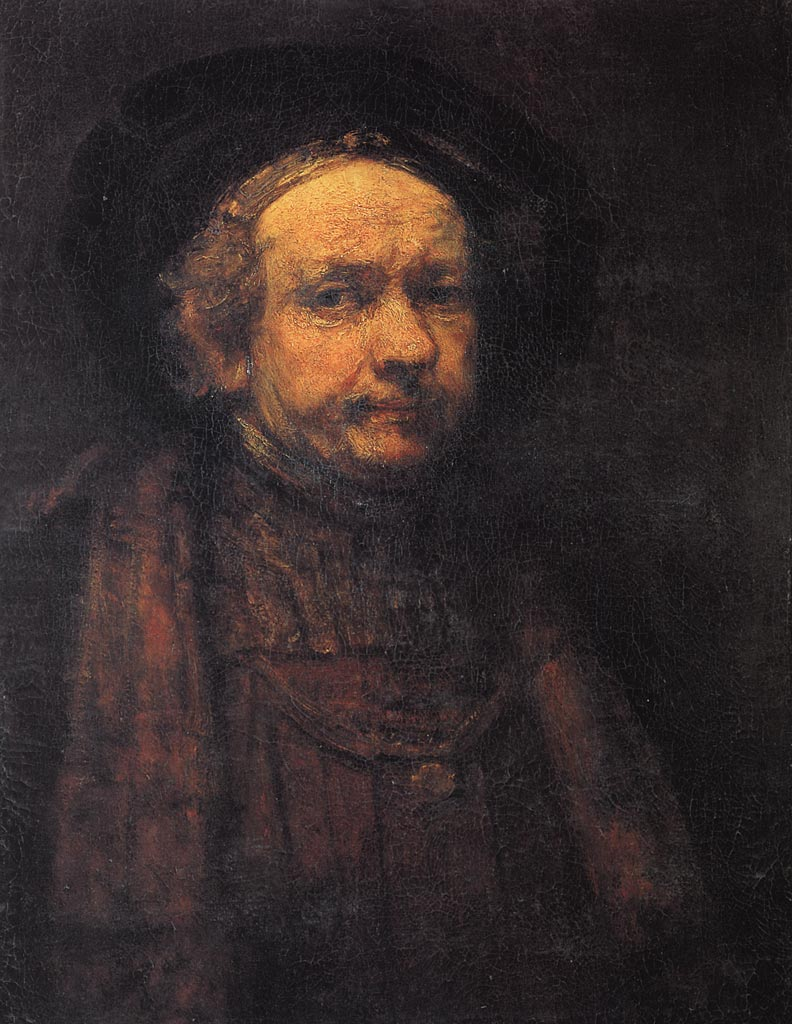
Rembrandt, Self-portrait, 1668–1669, Galleria degli Uffizi, Florence

Grand Duke Ferdinando encouraged Cosimo to go on a European tour to distract him from Marguerite Louise's renewed hostility. On 28 October 1667 he arrived in Tyrol, where he was entertained by his aunt, Anna de' Medici, Archduchess of Further Austria. He took a barge down the Rhine to Amsterdam, where he was well received by the art community, meeting painter Rembrandt van Rijn. From Amsterdam, he travelled to Hamburg, where awaiting him was Queen Christina of Sweden. He reached Florence in May 1668. There he took in the painter and architect Pier Maria Baldi as a chamberlain, who accompanied him through the rest of his travels through Europe. Another great personage that accompanied Cosimo was the Italian philosopher and diplomat Lorenzo Magalotti, who proceeded to document and describe their travels.

The excursion did Cosimo good. His health was better than ever, as was his self-esteem. His wife's unrelenting enmity towards him, however, undid the aforesaid progressions. Grand Duke Ferdinando, once again, feared for his health, so he sent him on a second tour in September 1668.

When he went to Spain, the disabled King Charles II received him in a private interview. By January 1669, he had arrived in Portugal, being welcomed by the Court and Peter II, where he stayed until March, visiting several villages and cities such as Lisbon, Setúbal, Santarém, Coimbra, Rates and Viana. Of the various monuments, convents and churches visited, it was the Monastery of Saint Denis of Odivelas that most aroused the curiosity of the Florentines due to the libertine lifestyle of the nuns living there. In Lisbon, Cosimo also had the opportunity to talk several times with the Jesuit Priest António Vieira and to attend his famous masses. After leaving Caminha by sea they arrived at La Coruña where they took another ship. At some point, the ship met an uncomfortable storm that made them land in Kinsale, Ireland. From there they went to England, where he met Charles II. Samuel Pepys described him as "a very jolly and good comely man." Cosimo was amiably welcomed by the Universities of Oxford and Cambridge, for his father's perceived protection of Galileo Galilei from the Inquisition. He met with scientists such as Robert Hooke, Henry Oldenburg, Isaac Newton and Robert Boyle; Cosimo bought a machine, built by Samuel Morland. In London, he stayed at St. Albans House as a guest of the Earl of St Albans.

On the return, he travelled again through the Dutch Republic; this time he bought a self-portrait which Rembrandt had finished in the meantime. He visited Jan Swammerdam and his collection of insects. Passing Aachen, Cosimo visited Louis XIV and his mother-in-law, Marguerite of Lorraine, in Paris. He arrived back in Florence on 1 November 1669. His travels were described in a detailed journal by his travelling companion Lorenzo, Conte Magalotti (1637–1712).

== Reign ==
=== Departure of Marguerite Louise ===
Ferdinando II died on 23 May 1670 of apoplexy and dropsy and was interred in the Basilica of San Lorenzo, the Medicean necropolis. At the time of his death, the population of the grand duchy was 720,594 souls; the streets were lined with grass and the buildings on the verge of collapse in Pisa, while Siena was virtually abandoned.

Grand Duchess Marguerite Louise and Dowager Grand Duchess Vittoria vied with each other for power. The Dowager, after a protracted battle, triumphed: The Grand Duke assigned his mother the day-to-day administration of the state. Cosimo III commenced his reign with the utmost fervour, attempting to salvage the sinking exchequer and allowing his subjects to petition him for arbitration in disputes. The novelty soon wore off, however. Vittoria, Cosimo having lost his taste for administration, was further empowered by admission to the Grand Duke's Consulta (Privy Council). Marguerite Louise, deprived of any political influence, went about arranging Prince Ferdinando's education and arguing with Vittoria over precedence, which only further encamped Cosimo on his mother's side. In the midst of this, on the first anniversary of Ferdinando II's death, Gian Gastone was born to the grand ducal couple.

Marguerite Louise feigned illness at the start of 1672: Louis XIV send Alliot le Vieux, Anne of Austria's personal physician, to tend to her. Dr. Alliot, unlike Saint-Mesme, did not comply with Marguerite Louise's plot to be sent to France, ostensibly for the thermal waters to ameliorate her "illness." In December she went on a pilgrimage to Villa di Pratolino—she never returned. Marguerite Louise, instead of going back to Florence, chose to live in semi-retirement at the Villa di Poggio a Caiano. The Grand Duke eventually consented, but feared she may abscond, so she was not allowed to go to leave without his permission and when she went riding she was to be escorted by four soldiers. All the doors and windows of the villa had to be secured, too. The saga between them continued until 26 December 1674, after all attempts at conciliation failed, a beleaguered Cosimo agreed to allow his wife to depart for the Convent of Montmartre, France. The contract signed that day renounced her rights as a Princess of the Blood and with them the dignity Royal Highness. Cosimo granted her a pension of 80,000 livres in compensation. She departed the next June, after stripping bare Poggio a Caiano of any valuables.

=== Persecution of Jews and the Lorrainer succession ===
Without Marguerite Louise to occupy his attention, Cosimo turned to persecuting the Jewish population of Tuscany. Sexual intercourse between Jews and Christians was proscribed, and by a law promulgated on 1 July 1677, Christians could not work in establishments owned by Jews. If they did regardless, a fine of 50 crowns was incurred; if the person in question had insufficient funds, he was liable to be tortured on the rack; and if he was deemed unfit for torture, a four-month prison sentence was substituted. The antisemitic roster was supplemented by further declarations on 16 June 1679 and 12 December 1680 banning Jews from visiting Christian prostitutes and co-habitation, respectively.

Meanwhile, in Lorraine, Charles V was without an heir and Marguerite-Louise, as the daughter of a Lorrainer princess, delegated the right to succeed to the duchy to her elder son, Ferdinando. Grand Duke Cosimo tried to get his son international recognition as heir-apparent, to no avail. Leopold I, Holy Roman Emperor, supported Cosimo's claim, not wanting to see Lorraine revert to France. The Treaties of Nijmegen, which concluded the Franco-Dutch War, did not rubber stamp Cosimo's ambitions, as he had wished. The Lorrainer question was concluded with the birth of a son to Charles V in 1679, ending Cosimo's dream of a Medici cadet branch, dreams which were to be revived in 1697 by Gian Gastone's marriage to an heiress.

=== 1679–1685 ===
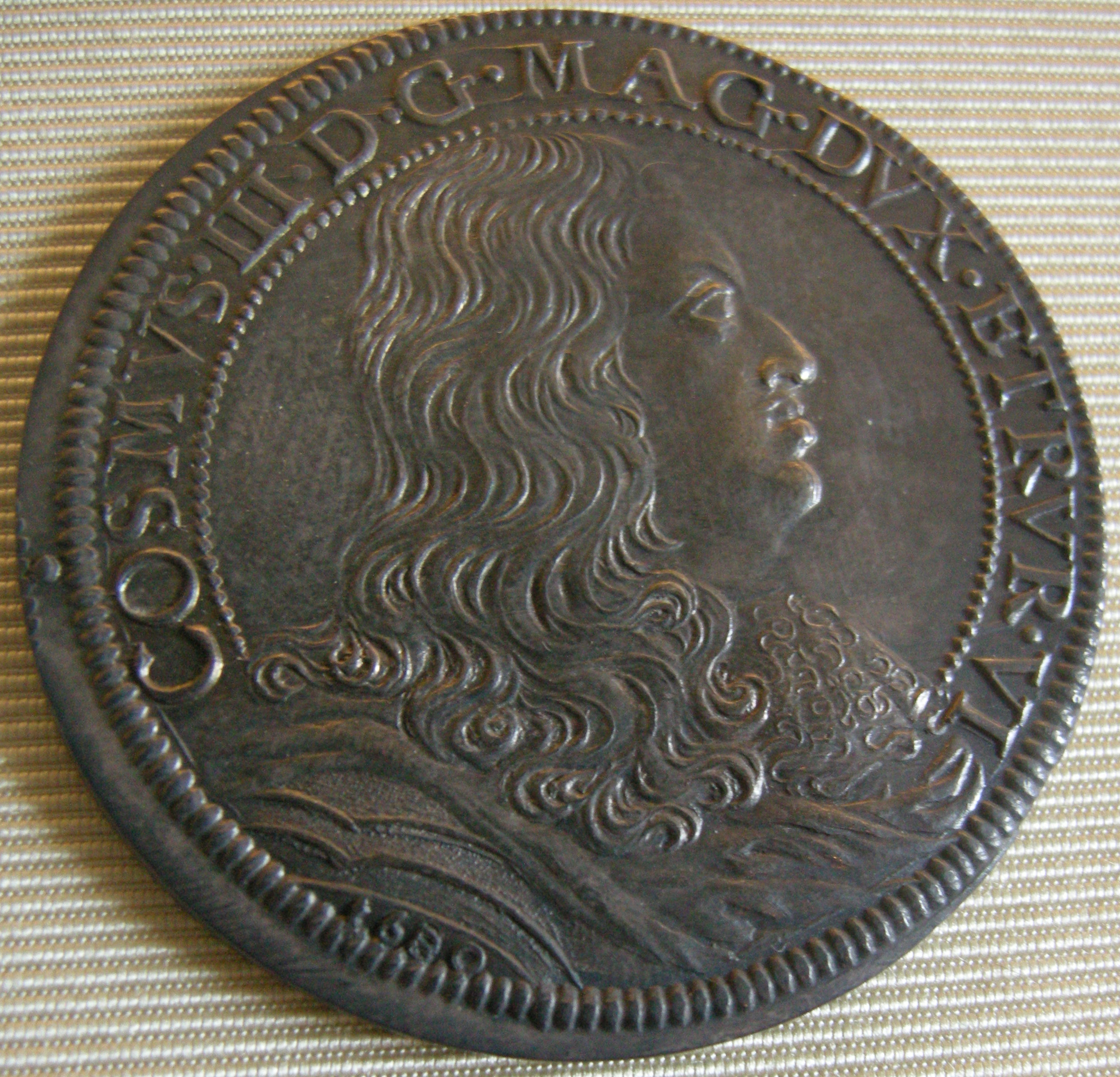
A contemporary piastra bearing the effigy of Cosimo III. Latin inscription: COSMVS III D[EI] G[RATIA] MAG[NVS] DVX ETRVR[AE]. "Cosimo III, by the Grace of God, Grand Duke of Etruria (Tuscany)"

Cosimo kept himself apprised of his wife's conduct in France through the Tuscan emissary, Gondi. Marguerite Louise frequently requested more money from the Grand Duke, while he was scandalised by her behaviour: she took up with a groom named Gentilly. In January 1680 the Abbess of Montemarte asked Cosimo to pay for the construction of a reservoir, following a scandal at the convent: the Grand Duchess had placed her pet dog's basket in close proximity to the fire, and the basket burst into flames, but instead of trying to extinguish it, she urged her fellow nuns to flee for their lives. On previous occasions, she had explicitly stated that she would burn down the convent if the Abbess disagreed with her, too, making the Abbess view the accident as intentional. Cosimo, unable to do much else for fear of upsetting Louis XIV, reproached her in a series of letters. Another scandal erupted that summer: the Grand Duchess bathed nude, as was the custom, in a local river. Cosimo exploded with anger upon hearing of this. Louis XIV, tiring of Florence's petitions, retorted: "Since Cosimo had consented to the retirement of his wife into France, he had virtually relinquished all right to interfere in her conduct." Following Louis XIV's rebuff, Cosimo fell grievously ill, only to be roused by Francesco Redi, his physician, who helped him reform his ways so illness would never strike him again. It was after this event that Cosimo finally stopped bothering with the Grand Duchess's life. In 1682 Cosimo III appointed his brother, Francesco Maria de' Medici, Governor of Siena.

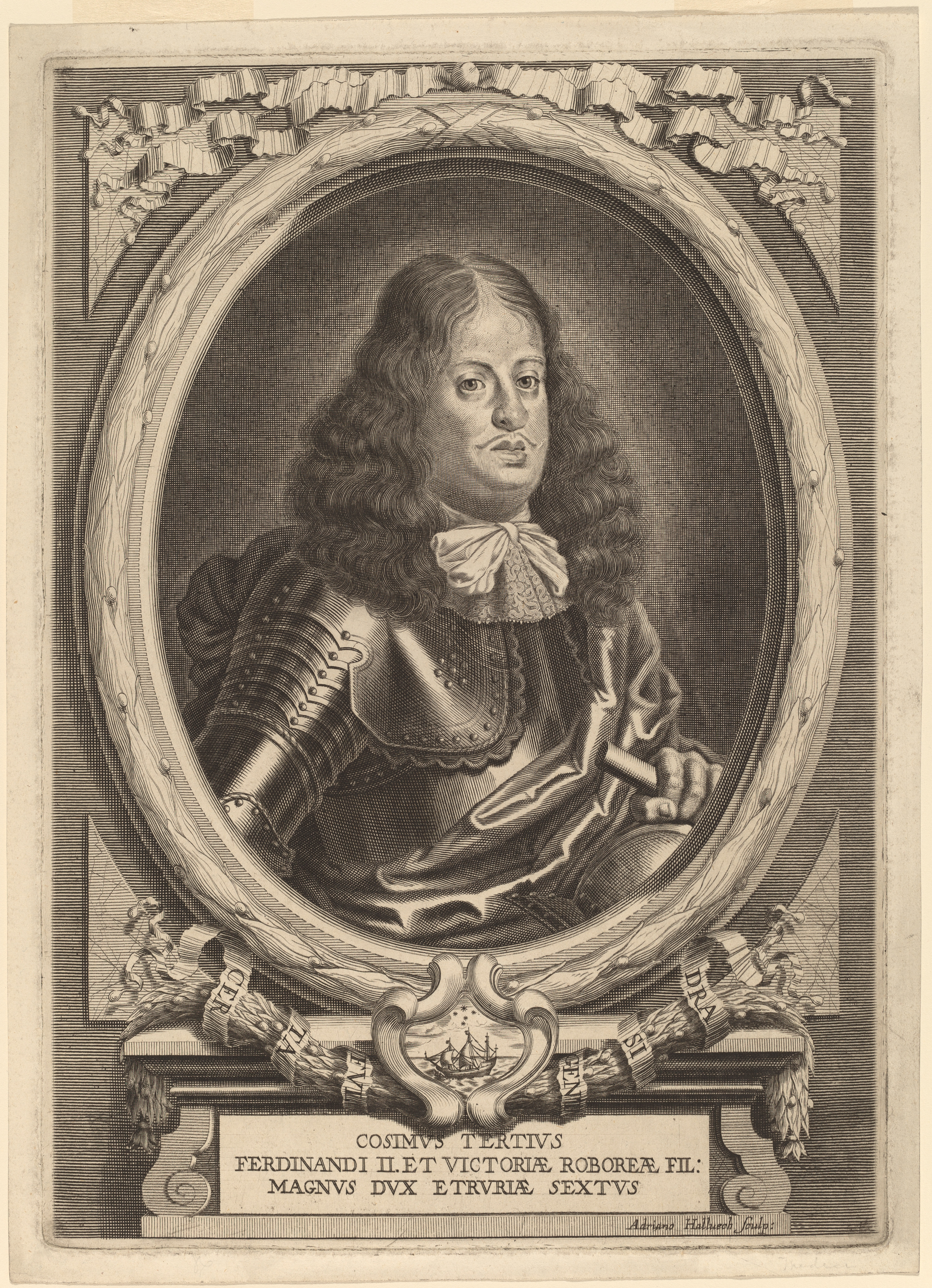
Cosimo III, Grand Duke of Tuscany, engraving by Adriaen Haelwegh before 1691, from the collection of the National Gallery of Art

Leopold I, Holy Roman Emperor requested Cosimo's participation in the Great Turkish War. At first, he resisted, but then sent a consignment of munitions to Trieste, and offered to join the Holy League. They defeated the Turks at the Battle of Vienna in September 1683. To Cosimo's dismay, "many scandals and disorders continued to occur in the matter of carnal intercourse between Jews and Christian women, and especially putting their children out to be suckled by Christian nurses." The Grand Duke, wishing to supplement the "foe of heretics" persona he acquired after Vienna, outlawed the practice of Jews using Christian wet nurses and declared that if a Christian father wished to have his half-Jewish child suckled by a Christian nurse he must first apply to the government for a permit in writing. In addition, public executions increased to six per day. Gilbert Burnet, Bishop of Salisbury and a famed memorialist, visited this Florence in November 1685, of which he wrote that "[Florence] is much sunk from what it was, for they do not reckon that there are fifty thousand souls in it; the other states, that were once great republic, such as Siena and Pisa, while they retained their liberty, are now shrunk almost into nothing..."

=== Marriage of the Grand Prince Ferdinando ===
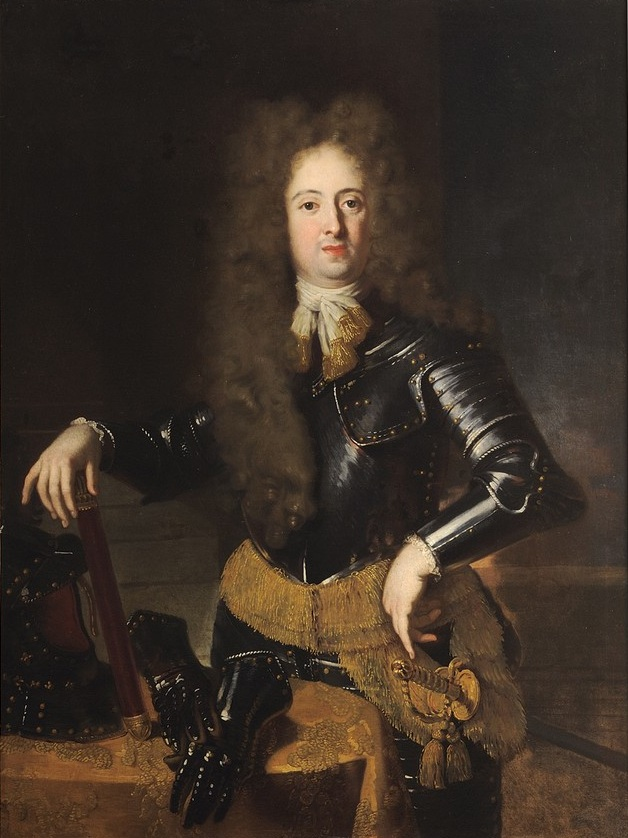
Ferdinando de' Medici, Cosimo's elder son, by Niccolò Cassana

Cosimo went about arranging a marriage for his elder son, Ferdinando, in 1686. He ushered him into the marriage as the other Tuscan princes, Francesco Maria de' Medici and Gian Gastone de' Medici, were sickly and unlikely to produce children. The main suitors were: Violante of Bavaria, a Bavarian princess, Isabel Luisa of Portugal (the heiress-apparent of Portugal) and the Elector Palatine's daughters.

Negotiations with the Portuguese were intense, but stalled over certain clauses: Ferdinando and Isabel Luisa would live in Lisbon, Ferdinando would renounce his right to the Tuscan throne unless the Infanta's father, King Peter II, remarried and had male issue, and if Isabel Luisa became Queen of Portugal, and Cosimo III, Gian Gastone and Francesco Maria died without any male heirs, Tuscany would be annexed by Portugal. Ferdinando rejected it outright with the fullest support of Louis XIV, his great-uncle. Cosimo's eyes now fell upon Violante of Bavaria. Choosing her would strengthen ties between France—where Violante's sister was the dauphine—and Bavaria. There was only one obstacle in the way: Ferdinando II, Cosimo's father, impartially advised Violante's father, Ferdinand Maria, to invest a huge sum into a bank. Soon after the Elector deposited the sum, the bank collapsed. Ferdinand Maria still had sore feelings; Cosimo consented to the reduction of her dowry accordingly to reimburse the Elector. Ferdinando was unimpressed with his wife. Violante, however, electrified the Grand Duke. He wrote, "I have never known, nor do I think the world can produce, a disposition so perfect..."

=== Royal Highness ===
Duke Victor Amadeus II of Savoy procured the style Royal Highness from Spain and the Holy Roman Empire in June 1689, infuriating Grand Duke Cosimo, who complained to Vienna that a duke was inferior status to a grand duke, and proclaimed it "unjustly exalted...since the House of Savoy had not increased to the point of vying with kings, nor had the House of Medici diminished in splendour and possessions, so there was no reason for promoting one and degrading the other." Cosimo also played upon all the times Tuscany provided financial and military assistance to the Empire. The Emperor, anxious to avoid friction, suggested that Anna Maria Luisa should marry Johann Wilhelm, Elector Palatine to compensate for the affront. The Elector Palatine, two years later, several months before his marriage to Anna Maria Luisa, went about acquiring the aforesaid style for Cosimo and his family, despite the fact that they had no claim to any kingdom. Henceforth, Cosimo was His Royal Highness The Most Serene Grand Duke of Tuscany.

=== 1691–1694 ===
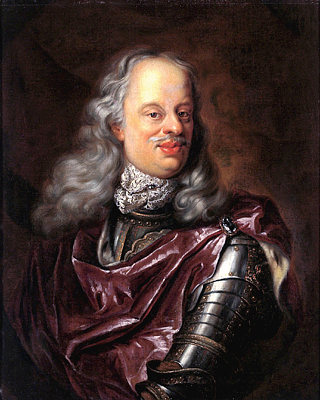
Cosimo III in old age, by Jan Frans van Douven

Louis XIV was angered by Anna Maria Luisa's marriage to his sworn foe. Cosimo, after much coaxing, persuaded him otherwise. On 9 October 1691, France, England, Spain and the United Provinces guaranteed the neutrality of the Tuscan port of Livorno. The Empire, meanwhile, was attempting to extract feudal dues from Cosimo, and ordering him to ally with Austria. The Grand Duke replied that if he did so France would send a naval fleet from Toulon to occupy his state; the Emperor reluctantly accepted this excuse. Tuscany was not alone in its feudal ties to the Empire: A large part of northern Italy was also bound to pay the Emperor, but at a much higher magnitude than Cosimo, who merely paid on his few undisputed Imperial fiefs.

Cosimo, not having much else to do, instituted more moral laws. Young men were not allowed to "enter into houses to make love to girls, and let them dally at doors and windows, is a great incentive to rapes, abortions, and infanticides..." If a man did not comply, he was liable to receive enormous fines. This coincided with a new wave of taxes that stagnated Tuscany's already declining economy. Harold Acton recounts that a bale of wool "sent from Leghorn and Cortona had to pass through ten intermediate customs." The Grand Duke oversaw the establishment of the Office of Public Decency, whose goal was to regulate prostitution, also. Prostitutes were oft thrown into the Stinche, a jail for women of that profession, for years, with scant food, if they could not afford the fines levied on them by the Office of Public Decency. Evening permits and exemptions were available for those willing to pay six crowns per month.

Cosimo resurrected a law from the regency of his father which banned students from attending college outside Tuscany, thus strengthening the Jesuits' hold on education. A contemporary wrote that not a single man in Florence could read or write Greek, a stark contrast to those of the old republic. In a letter dated 10 October 1691, Cosimo's personal secretary wrote, "By the Serene Master's express command I must inform Your Excellencies that His Highness will allow no professor in his university at Pisa to read or teach, in public or in private, by writing or voice, the philosophy of Democritus, or of atoms, or any save that of Aristotle."

Ferdinando and Violante, despite being married for over five years, had not produced any offspring as of 1694. The Grand Duke responded by declaring special days of devotion, and erecting a "fertility column" in the Cavour district of Florence, an act which attracted popular ridicule. Ferdinando would not attend to Violante, instead lavishing his attentions on his favourite, a castrated Venetian, Cecchino de Castris. The same year, Dowager Grand Duchess Vittoria, who had once exercised a great deal of influence over Cosimo, died. Her allodial possessions, the Duchies of Montefeltro and Rovere, inherited from her grandfather, the last Duke of Urbino, were bestowed upon her younger son, Francesco Maria de' Medici.

=== Marriage of Gian Gastone ===
Cosimo became perturbed by the question of the Tuscan Succession following the death of his mother. Ferdinando was lacking any children, as was Anna Maria Luisa. The latter, who was high in her father's estimation, put forward a German princess to marry Gian Gastone. The lady in question, Anna Maria Franziska of Saxe-Lauenburg, nominal heiress of the Duchy of Saxe-Lauenburg, was extremely wealthy. Cosimo once again dreamed of a Medici cadet branch in a foreign land. They were married on 2 July 1697. She and Gian Gastone did not get along; he eventually abandoned her in 1708.

=== Dawn of the 18th century ===
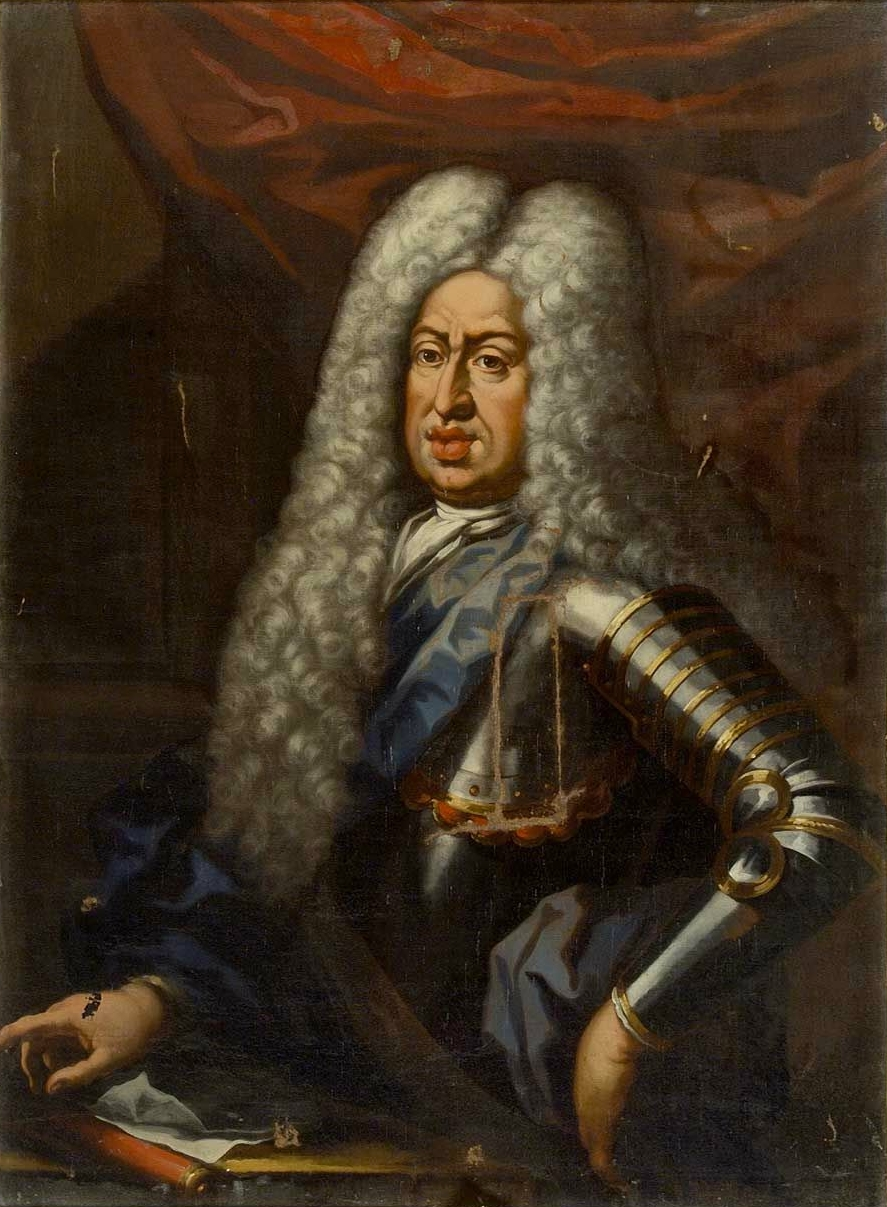
Portrait of Gian Gastone de' Medici

The 17th century did not end well for the Grand Duke: he still had no grandchildren, France and Spain would not acknowledge his royal status and the Duke of Lorraine declared himself King of Jerusalem without any opposition. In May 1700 Cosimo embarked on a pilgrimage to Rome. Pope Innocent XII, after much persuasion, created Cosimo a Canon of Saint John in the Lateran, in order to allow him to view the Volto Santo, a cloth thought to have been used by Christ before his crucifixion. Delighted by his warm reception from the Roman people, Cosimo left Rome with a fragment of Saint Francis Xavier's bowels.

Charles II of Spain died in November 1700. His death, without any ostensible heir, brought about the War of the Spanish Succession, which involved all of the European powers. Tuscany, however, remained neutral. Cosimo recognised Philip, duc d'Anjou, as Carlos's successor, whose administration refused to sanction the Trattamento Reale reserved for the royal family. The Grand Duke, soon after the royal altercation, accepted the investiture of the nominal Spanish fief of Siena from Philip, thereby confirming his status as a Spanish vassal.

Gian Gastone was consuming money at a rapid pace in Bohemia, wracking up titanic debts. The Grand Duke, alarmed, sent the Marquis Rinnuci to scrutinise the Prince's debts. Rinnuci was abhorred to discover that Jan Josef, Count of Breuner and Archbishop of Prague, was among his creditors. In an attempt to salvage Gian Gastone from shipwreck, Rinnuci tried to coerce Anna Maria Franziska to return to Florence, where Gian Gastone longed to be. She blankly refused. Her confessor, hoping to keep her in Bohemia, regaled her with tales of the "poisoned" Eleanor of Toledo and Isabella Orsini, other Medici consorts.

The Scottish artists John Smibert and John Alexander benefited from Cosimo's patronage in the early years of the 18th Century. Smibert was accorded the privilege of copying from paintings in his collection. The Duke's help led Alexander to dedicate his engravings by Raphael to him.

=== Tuscan succession and later years ===
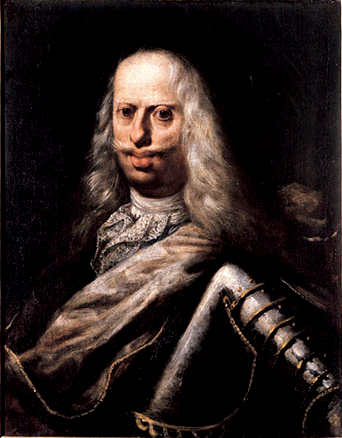
The Grand Duke in the latter years of life

Cosimo's piety had not faded in the slightest since his youth. He visited the Florentine Convent of Saint Mark on a daily basis. A contemporary recounted that "The Grand Duke knows all the monks of Saint Mark at least by sight..." This, however, did not occupy all his efforts: he was still trying to coax Anna Maria Franziska to Florence, where he believed her caprices would cease. Additionally, in 1719, he claimed that God asked him to pledge the grand duchy to "the governance and absolute dominion of the most glorious Saint Joseph".

Leopold I, Holy Roman Emperor, died in May 1705. His successor, Joseph I, took to government with a burst of ebullience. Following the Battle of Turin, a decisive Imperial victory, the Emperor sent an envoy to Florence to collect feudal dues, amounting to 300,000 doubloons, an exorbitant sum; and to force Cosimo to recognise the Archduke Charles as king of Spain. Fearing a Franco-Dutch invasion, Cosimo III refused to recognise Charles's title, but he did pay a fraction of the dues.

The Grand Prince Ferdinando was grievously ill with syphilis; he had become prematurely senile, not recognising anybody who came to see him. Cosimo despaired. He successfully requisitioned the assistance of Pope Clement XI with Anna Maria Franziska. He sent the Archbishop of Prague to reproach her. She cited the example of Marguerite-Louise, adding that the Pope did not bother himself to contrive a reconciliation. Cosimo wrote desperate missives to the Electress Palatine: "I can tell you now, in case you are not informed, that we have no money in Florence..." He added that "two or three-quarters of my pension are fallen into arrears".

Gian Gastone arrived in Tuscany without his wife in 1708. The Emperor, thinking it unlikely that any male heirs were to be born to the Medici, prepared to occupy Tuscany, under the pretext of Medici descent. He intimated that upon the Grand Prince's death the Tuscans would rebel against Cosimo's autocratic government. Cosimo, in an act of desperation, had Francesco Maria, the Medici family cardinal, renounce his religious vows and marry Eleanor of Gonzaga, the youngest child of the incumbent Duke of Guastalla. Two years later, Francesco Maria died, taking with him any hope of an heir.

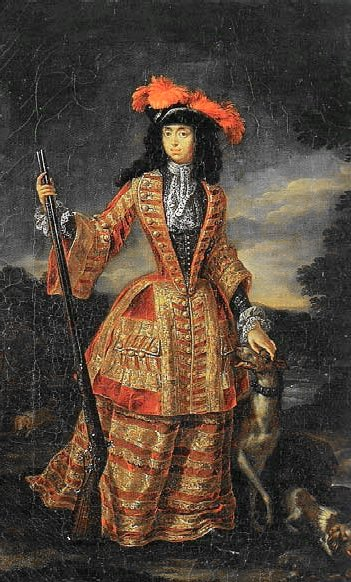
The Electress Anna Maria Luisa, by van Douven

Without any ostensible heirs, Cosimo contemplated restoring the Republic of Florence. However, this presented many obstacles. Florence was nominally an Imperial fief, and Siena a Spanish one. The plan was about to be approved by the powers convened at Geertruidenberg when Cosimo abruptly added that if he and his two sons predeceased the Electress Palatine she should succeed and the republic be re-instituted following her death. The proposal sank and was, ultimately, put on hold following Emperor Joseph's death.

Charles VI, Holy Roman Emperor, agreed to an audience with the Electress Palatine in December 1711. He concluded that the Electress's succession brought no quandary, but added that he must succeed her. Cosimo and herself were abhorred by his reply. Realising how unforthcoming he had been, Charles wrote to Florence agreeing to the project, mentioning but one clause: the Tuscan state must not be bequeathed to the enemies of the House of Austria. At the culmination of the War of the Spanish Succession, at the Treaties of Utrecht and Rattstatt, Cosimo did not vie for international assurances for the Electress's succession, inaction that he would later lament.

The Grand Prince finally succumbed to syphilis on 30 October 1713. Cosimo deposited a succession bill in the Senate, Tuscany's nominal legislature, on 26 November. The bill promulgated that if Gian Gastone predeceased the Electress Palatine, she should ascend to all the states of the grand duchy. The senators responded to the proposal by giving a standing ovation. Charles VI, however, was furious. He retorted that the grand duchy was an Imperial fief and that he alone had the prerogative to choose who would succeed. Elisabeth Farnese, heiress to the Duchy of Parma and the second wife of Philip V of Spain, as a great-granddaughter of Margherita de' Medici, exercised a claim to Tuscany.

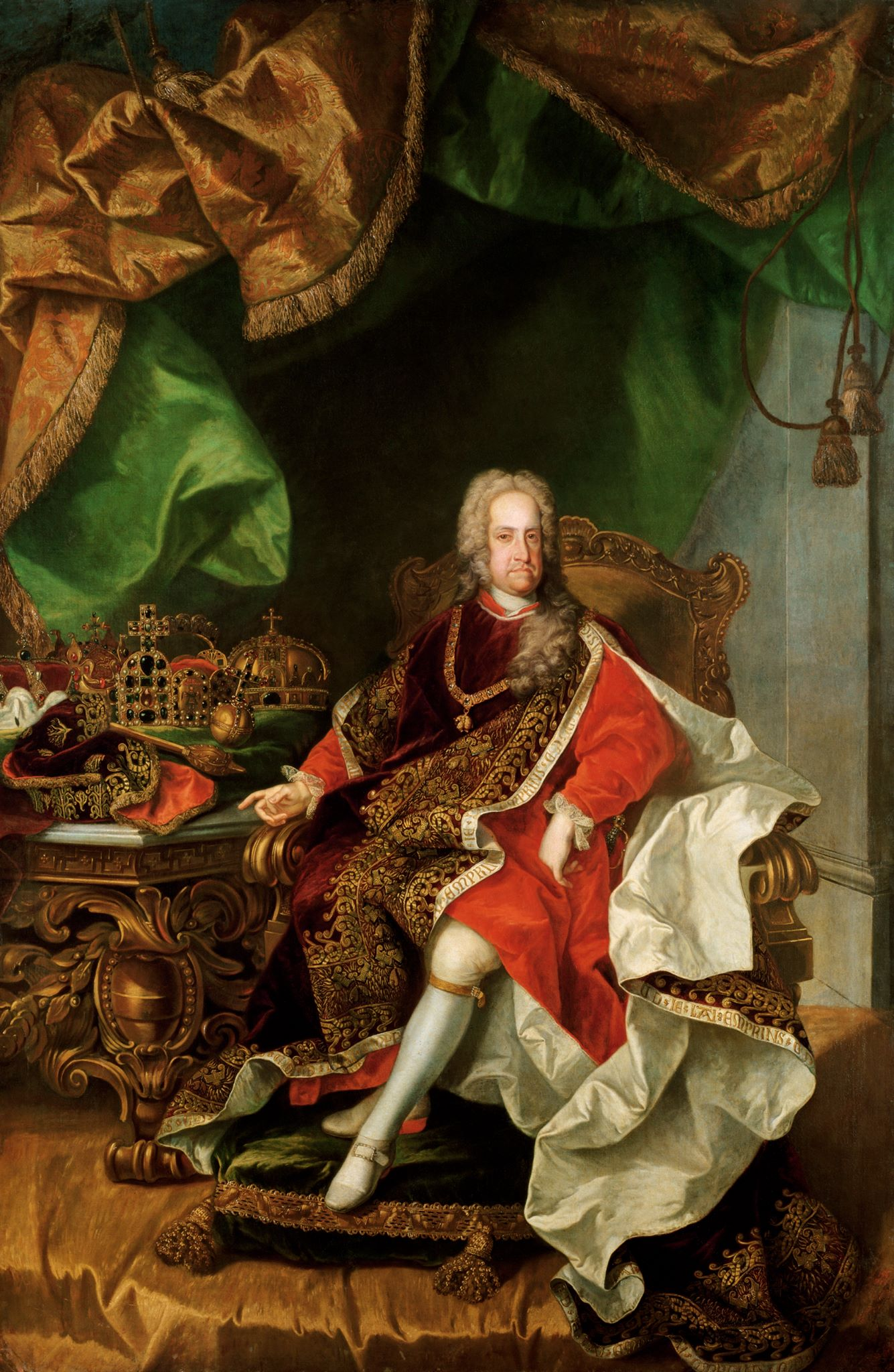
Charles VI, Holy Roman Emperor, by Johann Gottfried Auerbach

In May 1716, the Emperor assured the Electress and the Grand Duke that there was no insurmountable obstacle preventing her accession, but that Austria and Tuscany must soon reach an agreement regarding which royal house which was to succeed the Medici. As an incentive to accelerate Cosimo's reply, the Emperor hinted that Tuscany would reap territorial advancements. In June 1717 Cosimo declared his wish that the House of Este should succeed. Charles VI's promises never materialised. In 1718 he repudiated Cosimo's decision, declaring a union between Tuscany and Modena (the Este lands) unacceptable. On 4 April 1718 Great Britain, France and the Dutch Republic (and later Austria) selected Infante Charles of Spain, the eldest child of Elisabeth Farnese and Philip V of Spain, as the Tuscan heir. By 1722 the Electress was not even acknowledged as heiress, and Cosimo was reduced to a spectator at the conferences for Tuscany's future.

Johann Wilhelm, Elector Palatine died in June 1717. Anna Maria Luisa returned home in October 1717, bringing with her vast treasures. Cosimo created his elder son's widow, Violante of Bavaria, Governess of Siena to define her precedence clearly. That did not stop the two ladies from quarrelling, as was his intention. Cosimo discontinued hunting following an accident in January 1717 during which he shot and killed a man. He was so distraught that he wished to be tried by the Knights of the Order of Saint Stephen. The state of the grand duchy reflected the decay of its ruler; in a 1718 military review, the army numbered fewer than 3,000 men, some of whom were infirm and aged about 70. The navy composed of three galleys and the crew 198. In September 1721, the Grand Duchess died; instead of willing her possessions to her children, as prescribed by the 1674 agreement; they went to the Princess of Epinoy.

=== Death and legacy ===
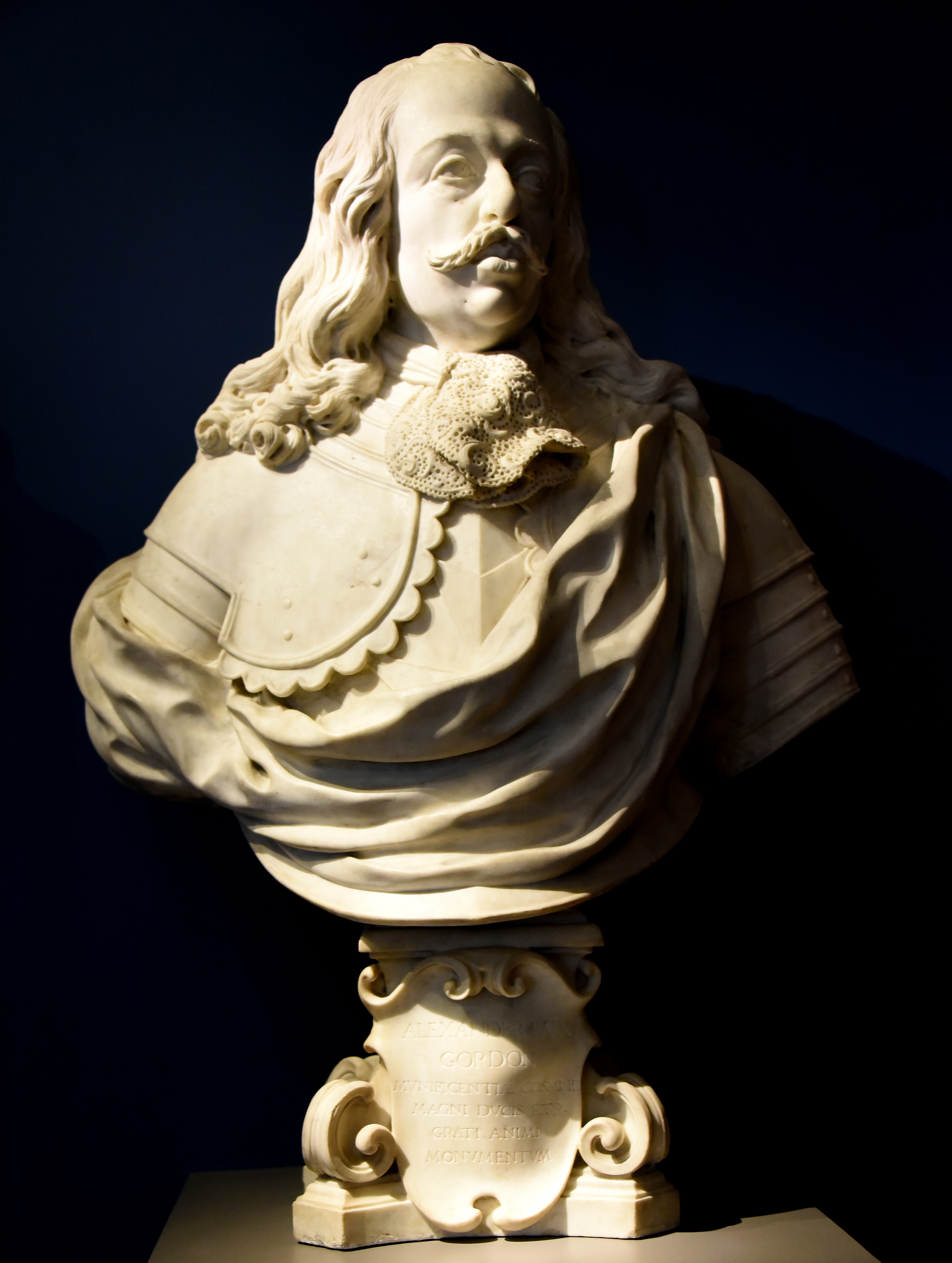
Bust of Cosimo III de' Medici, 1717–1718 CE. By Giovanni Battista Figgini. Marble, from Florence, Italy. The Victoria and Albert Museum, London

On 22 September 1723, the Grand Duke experienced a two-hour-long fit of trembling. His condition steadily deteriorated. Cosimo was attended by the Papal nuncio and the Archbishop of Pisa on his deathbed. The latter pronounced, "that this Prince required little assistance in order to die well, for he had studied and cared for nothing else throughout the long course of his life, but to prepare himself for death". On 25 October 1723, six days before his death, Grand Duke Cosimo disseminated a final proclamation commanding that Tuscany shall stay independent; Anna Maria Luisa shall succeed uninhibited to Tuscany after Gian Gastone; the Grand Duke reserves the right to choose his successor, but these stanzas were completely ignored. Six days later, on All Hallow's Eve, he died. He was interred in the Basilica of San Lorenzo, the Medici necropolis.

Cosimo III left Tuscany one of the poorest nations in Europe; the treasury empty and the people weary of religious bigotry, the state itself was reduced to a gaming chip in European affairs. Among his enduring edicts is the establishment of the Chianti wine region. Gian Gastone repealed Cosimo's Jewish persecution laws, and eased tariffs and customs. Cosimo's inability to uphold Tuscany's independence led to the succession of the House of Lorraine upon Gian Gastone's death in 1737.

== Issue ==
Cosimo III had three children with Marguerite Louise d'Orléans, a granddaughter of Henry IV of France:

1. Ferdinando de' Medici, Grand Prince of Tuscany (1663–1713) married Violante Beatrice of Bavaria, no issue;
2. Anna Maria Luisa de' Medici, Electress Palatine (1667–1743) married Johann Wilhelm, Elector Palatine, no issue;
3. Gian Gastone de' Medici, Grand Duke of Tuscany (1671–1737) married Anna Maria Franziska of Saxe-Lauenburg, no issue.

Cosimo did not enjoy a harmonious relationship with his elder son, Ferdinando. They disagreed about Cosimo's bigoted ideology and his monthly allowance. Cosimo married him to a Bavarian princess, Violante Beatrice. This union was exceedingly discontent, and produced no offspring. Anna Maria Luisa was the Grand Duke's favourite child. She married Johann Wilhelm, Elector Palatine, and like her brother, had no issue. Gian Gastone, Cosimo's eventual successor, despised his father and his court. Anna Maria Luisa arranged for him to marry Anna Maria Franziska of Saxe-Lauenburg, a union that produced no children.

== Honours ==
Styles of Cosimo III de' Medici, Most Serene Grand Duke of Tuscany
- Reference style: His Royal Highness
- Spoken style: Your Royal Highness

== Ancestors ==
Ancestors of Cosimo III de' Medici

8. Ferdinando I de' Medici, Grand Duke of Tuscany
4. Cosimo II de' Medici, Grand Duke of Tuscany
9. Christina of Lorraine
2. Ferdinando II de' Medici, Grand Duke of Tuscany
10. Charles II of Austria
5. Maria Magdalena of Austria
11. Maria Anna of Bavaria
1. Cosimo III de' Medici, Grand Duke of Tuscany
12. Francesco Maria II della Rovere
6. Federico Ubaldo della Rovere, Duke of Urbino
13. Livia della Rovere
3. Vittoria Della Rovere
14. Ferdinando I de' Medici, Grand Duke of Tuscany (= 8)
7. Claudia de' Medici
15. Christina of Lorraine (= 9)

== Bibliography ==
- Acton, Harold: The Last Medici, Macmillan, London, 1980, ISBN 0-333-29315-0
- Strathern, Paul: The Medici: Godfathers of the Renaissance, Vintage books, London, 2003, ISBN 978-0-09-952297-3
- Hale, J. R.: Florence and the Medici, Orion books, London, 1977, ISBN 1-84212-456-0
- van de Wetering, Ernst: Rembrandt: The Painter at Work, Amsterdam University Press, Amsterdam, 1997 ISBN 978-90-5356-239-0
- Setton, Kenneth M.: Western Hostility to Islam and Prophecies of Turkish Doom, Amer Philosophical Society, 1992, ISBN 978-0-87169-201-6

Cosimo III de' Medici House of Medici Born: 14 August 1642 Died: 31 October 1723
Regnal titles
Preceded by Ferdinando II de' Medici	Grand Duke of Tuscany; 1670–1723	Succeeded by Gian Gastone de' Medici
