= Servius the Grammarian =

Late 4th/early 5th century Roman grammarian

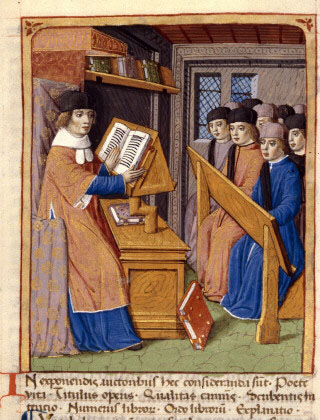
Servius commenting Virgil (France, 15th century).

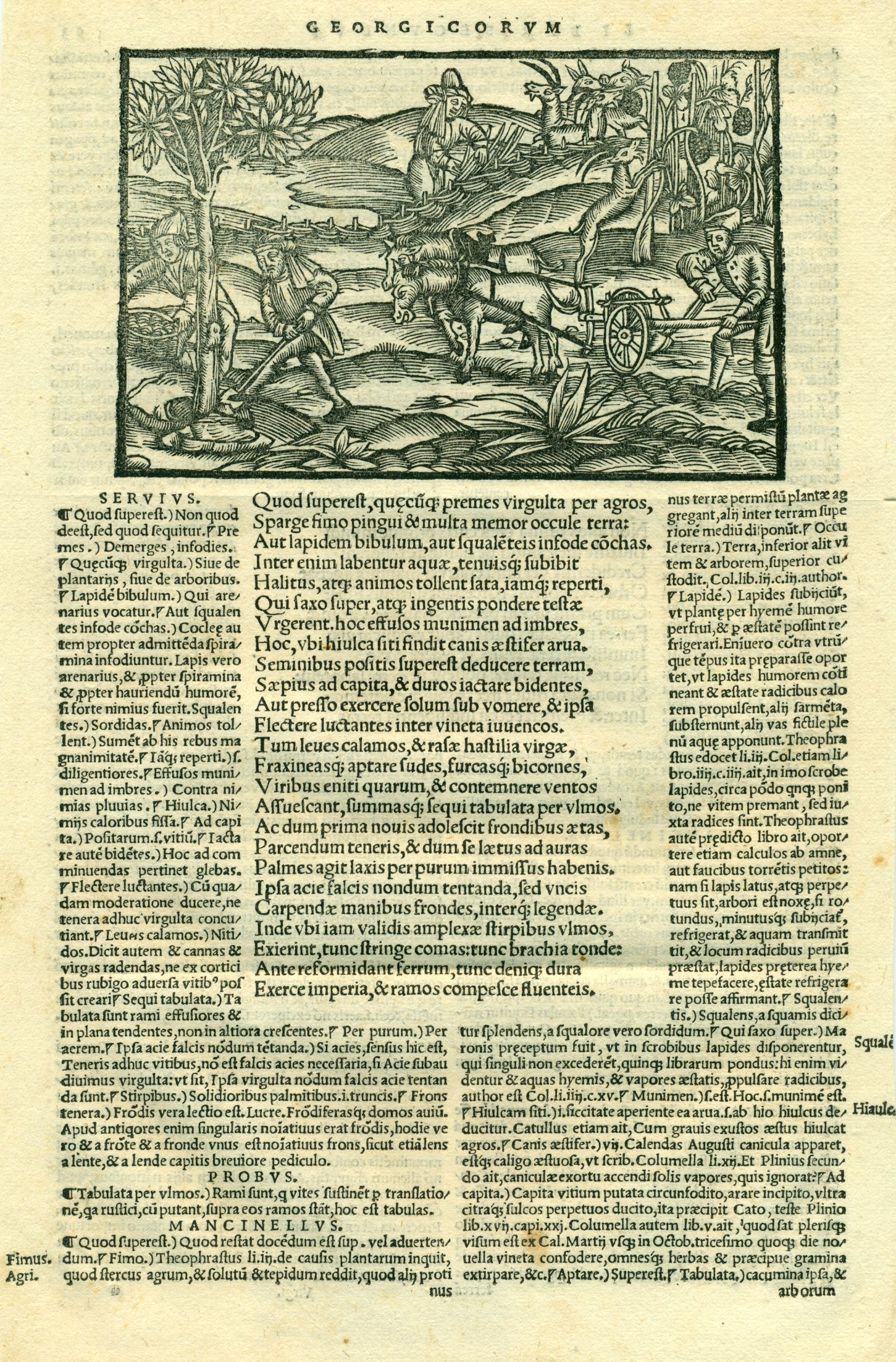
16th century edition of Virgil with Servius' commentary printed to the left of the text.

Servius, distinguished as Servius the Grammarian (Latin: Servius or Seruius Grammaticus), was a Roman grammarian of the late fourth and early fifth centuries, regarded by contemporaries as the most learned man of his generation in Italy. He authored a set of commentaries on the works of Virgil; these works, In Tria Virgilii Opera Expositio ("Exposition on Three Works of Virgil"), Commentarii in Virgilium ("Commentaries on Virgil"), Commentarii in Vergilii Opera ("Commentaries on the Works of Vergil"), or Vergilii Carmina Commentarii ("Commentaries on the Poems of Virgil"), constituted the first incunable to be printed at Florence, by Bernardo Cennini, in 1471.

In the Saturnalia of Macrobius, Servius appears as one of the interlocutors; allusions in that work and a letter from Symmachus to Servius indicate that he was not a convert to Christianity.

== Name ==
The name Servius also appears as Seruius owing to the unity of the Latin letters V and U from antiquity until as late as the 18th century. Many medieval manuscripts of Servius's commentaries give him the praenomen Marius or Maurus and the cognomen Honoratus. The authenticity of these names—shared by Christian saints—is now doubted.

== Commentaries on Virgil ==
The commentaries on Virgil's Aeneid—In Vergilii Aeneidem Commentarii, In Aeneida, Commentarii in Vergilii Aeneidem, In Vergilii Aeneidos Libros I–III Commentarii, or Ad Aen.—survive in two distinct manuscript traditions.

The first is a comparatively short commentary, attributed to Servius in the superscription in the manuscripts and by other internal evidence. The second class derive from the 10th and 11th centuries, embed the same text in a much expanded commentary. The copious additions are in contrasting style to the original; none of these manuscripts bears Servius' name, and the commentary is known traditionally as Servius auctus or Servius Danielis, from Pierre Daniel who first published it in 1600.

"The added matter is undoubtedly ancient, dating from a time but little removed from that of Servius, and is founded to a large extent on historical and antiquarian literature which is now lost. The writer is anonymous and probably a Christian", although one proposed author, Aelius Donatus, was a Christian.

A third class of manuscripts, written for the most part in Italy, includes the core text with interpolated scholia, which demonstrate the continued usefulness of the Virgilii Opera Expositio.

== Other works ==
Besides the Virgilian commentary, other works of Servius are extant: a collection of notes on the grammar (Ars grammatica) of Aelius Donatus; a treatise on metrical endings in verse (De finalibus); and a tract on the different poetic meters (De centum metris).

The edition of Georg Thilo and Hermann Hagen (1878–1902) remains the only edition of the whole of Servius' work. Currently in development is the Harvard Servius (Servianorum in Vergilii Carmina Commentariorum: Editionis Harvardianae); of the projected five volumes, two have so far appeared: ii (Aeneid 1–2), 1946, and iii (Aeneid 3–5), 1965.

== Sources ==
- Casali, Sergio and Fabio Stok (edd.). Servio: stratificazioni esegetiche e modelli culturali / Servius: exegetical stratifications and cultural models (Bruxelles: Éditions Latomus, 2008) (Collection Latomus, 317). ISBN 9782870312582.
- Rand, E. K., "Is Donatus's Commentary on Virgil Lost?" Classical Quarterly 10 (1916), 158–164. Donatus's authorship of the supplementary material.
- Savage, John Joseph Hannan, "The Manuscripts of the Commentary of Servius Danielis on Virgil", Harvard Studies in Classical Philology 43 (1932), 77–121. JSTOR 310668.
- Savage, John Joseph Hannan, "The Manuscripts of Servius's Commentary on Virgil", Harvard Studies in Classical Philology 45 (1934), 157–204. JSTOR 310634.
