= Santa Reparata, Florence =

Former cathedral in Florence, Italy

Coordinates: 43.773232°N 11.255992°E

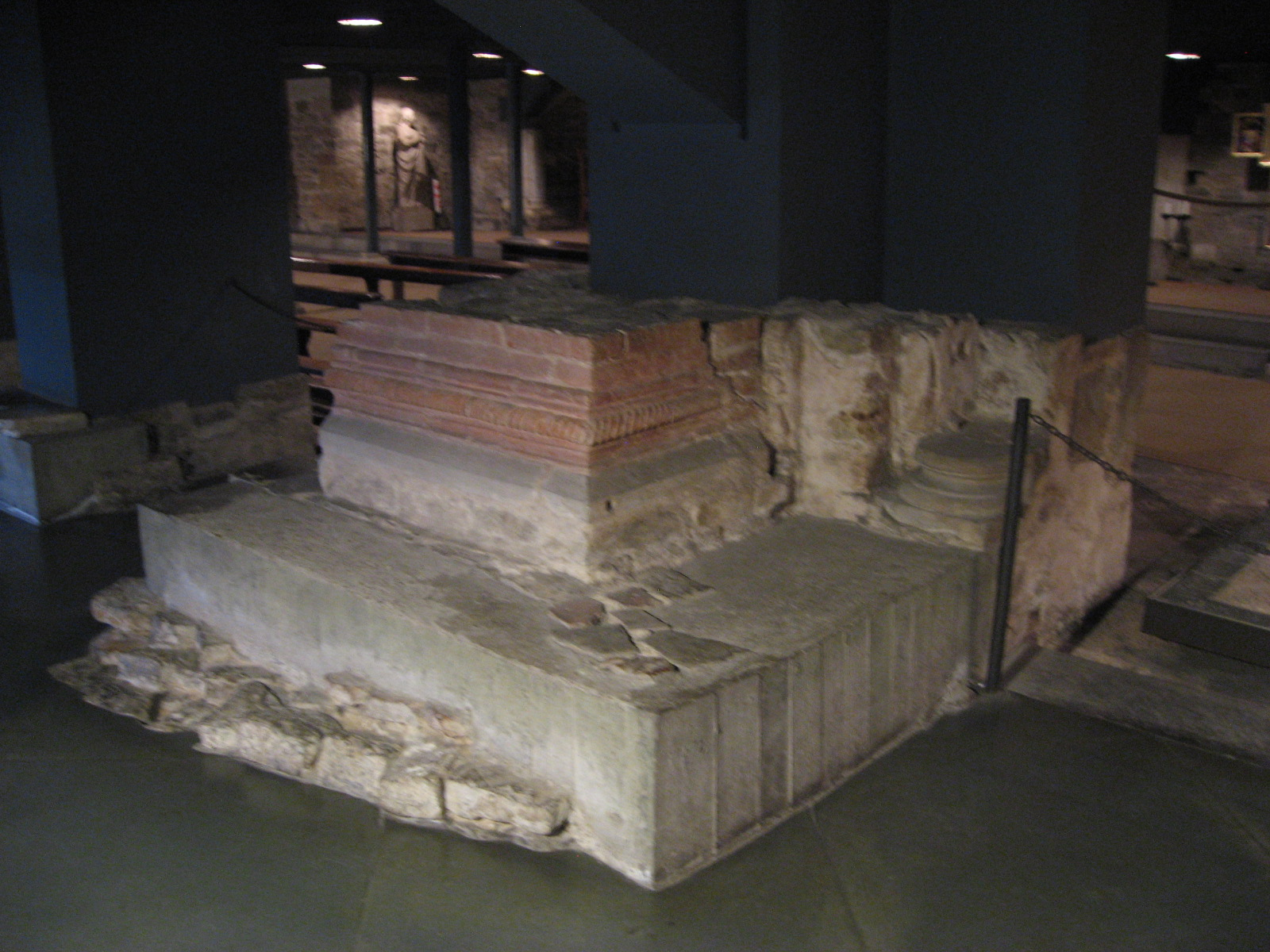
Remains of Santa Reparata underneath Florence Cathedral

Santa Reparata is the former cathedral of Florence, Italy. Its name refers to Saint Reparata, an early virgin martyr who is the co-patron saint of Florence. Florence Cathedral was constructed over it.

== Legends about the origin ==
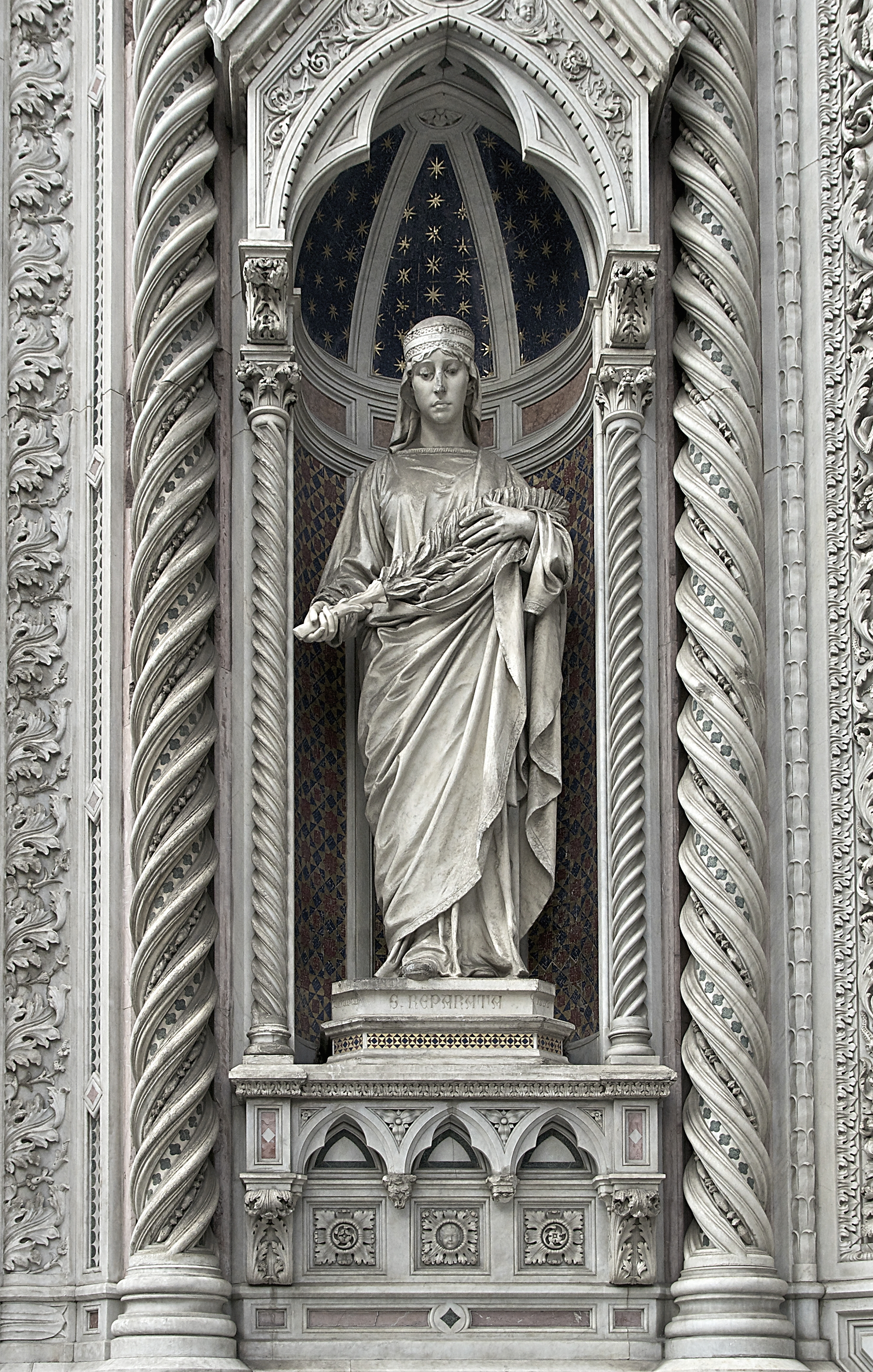
Statue of Saint Reparata at the central portal of Florence Cathedral

The oldest legends are related to one single event, the invasion of the Ostrogoths under Radagaisus:

- Santa Reparata was constructed to celebrate the victory over Radagaisus on the feast day of Saint Reparata, which happened in the reign of Honorius (emperor) (395 - 423).
- A variant of the previous legend says that the church existed before the battle and was dedicated to the Holy Saviour. Only the name of the building was changed when Radagaisus arrived.
- The third legend refers to the translation of the relics of Saint Zenobius from San Lorenzo to Santa Reparata, and dates this event to 430. Thus, the building must have already existed.

This last legend was important for the dating of the building. Still, the translation of Saint Zenobius’ relics is dated to the 9th century by most scientists, because the version according to which the transfer occurred in the 5th century is based on a tale by bishop Andrew, who in turn attributed the legend to the Milanese bishop Simplicianus, who, according to Andrew, wrote a biography of the saint. This biography turned out to be a forgery written around 1130.

Even though distinct proof does not exist, historians generally date the transfer to the 9th century, based on Andrew's version.

Neither are the other two legends about the origin based on solid evidence because the victory over Radagaisus happened in August 405 or 406, but the feast of Saint Reparata is celebrated on the 8 October. At any rate, in 1353 the local authorities, the Signoria, officially accepted the legend that the church was built in honor of Saint Reparata.

== Excavation ==
Excavated layers
The following data show the levels at which the finds were made, assuming the pavement of the preexisting Roman buildings as groundlevel. This groundlevel of S. Reparata is about 1,7 metres below today's street pavement.
- 2.70 m above this Roman groundlevel is the marble pavement of Santa Maria del Fiore, this is about one meter above today's street level.
- At 1.90 m there is rough cobblestone. This is the highest of the pavements that were preserved from S. Reparata. Between this and the level beneath there is a layer of simple filling material.
- At 1.05 m there are some remains of brick pavement, which indicate a new construction being built before the Council of Florence in 1055.
- At 0.50 m there are marble and stone plates with some elements in red clay. These are remains from the first reconstruction of S. Reparata in the Carolingian period.
- 30 cm above the Roman pavement there is a mosaic pavement, showing for example a peacock.
- At the groundlevel there is the Roman pavement made from cocciopesto, a crushed clay stone mass. In excavations from 1912 to 1915 Roman mosaics dating from the first century were also found on the same level, situated underneath the baptistery.

There were six distinct excavation campaigns between 1965 and 1974. A last excavation between the baptistery and stairway of the dome was conducted from 1971 to 1972. The discovery of the remains of Santa Reparata has delivered the most concrete evidence of the early Christian age in Florence, which had not been well documented previously. The evidence found before that time includes the excavations in 1948 in Santa Felicita, the notes about San Lorenzo cited by Paolino da Milano in his biography of Abrosius and some tombstones and sarcophagi, but little else.

The excavations were studied by the Canadian Franklin Toker and by da Morozzi, who have published their results. Toker based his work on studies conducted by the archeologist E. Galli during the first two decades of the 19th century. Toker continued the comparative studies undertaken by Galli with tombs that were rediscovered in the area before the baptistery. These tombs are no longer exhibited, but Galli published an account of his research. After reading the conclusions of Toker, Busignani found several inconsistencies that put some question marks to the dating of the levels that was based on the tombs. It is safer to base the research on the dating of coins that were discovered in the Roman soil between the layers of Santa Reparata.

All the coins that were found in the Roman soil belonged to a time frame from the era of emperor Gordianus III (238 to 244) and the reign of emperor Honorius (395 – 423). There is also a glass object, an S-shaped goblet, that was found in a tomb that was inserted in the mosaic pavement of the basilica, and therefore is dated later than the mosaic. By way of comparison with analogous finds which have reliable proofs for their dating, the goblet is dated to the end of the seventh century at the latest. At last, regarding these finds in the Roman soil, one can say that they are to be dated earlier than the 4th century. One can also conclude that at the end of the seventh or eighth century already the tiled floor with the mosaic needed to be partially renovated because the glass object was found in a tomb that was put in a zone where the floor had holes. This, according to Busignani, is sufficient evidence to maintain that the basilica was built at the end of the fourth century or during the first decades of the following century, after the victory of the Roman army over Radagaisus.

=== Floor plan of the first church ===
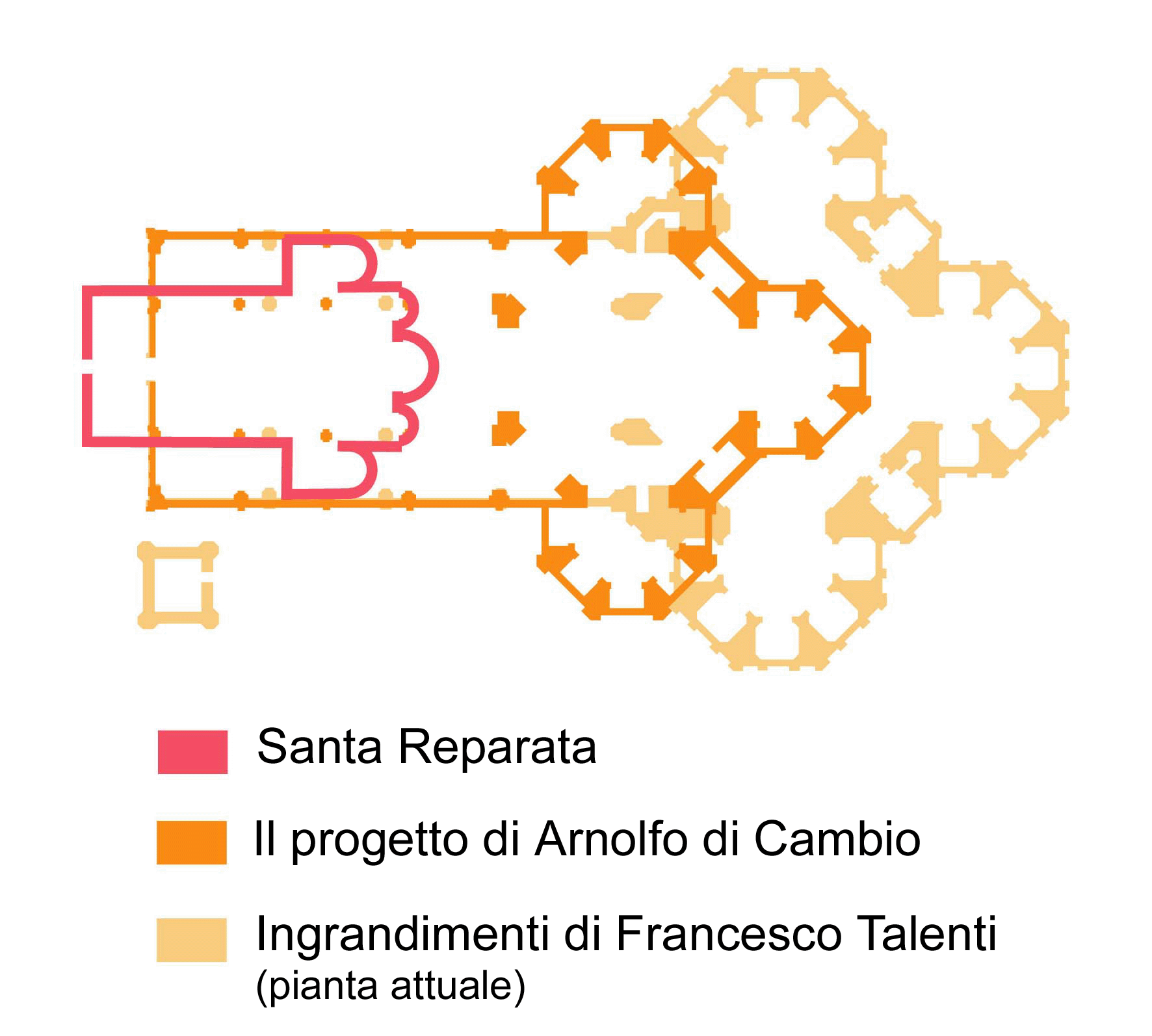
Plan of Santa Reparata (in red) with further extensions of Florence Cathedral which was constructed on top of it

The excavations have cast some light onto the floor plan of the first church, which featured the large mosaic. Also the changes that were made later to the subsequent reconstructions and rebuildings are based on this floor plan. In its original setting, Santa Reparata presented itself as a basilica with three naves, that were separated by fourteen pairs of columns. It had semi-circular apses, which could be dated to the end of the fourth century because of the typical paleo-Christian iconography of basilicas from the age of Constantine. In Florence works with this iconography are at Santa Felicita, and probably some works in San Lorenzo date back to that age.

It is not clear whether the columns carried arches or an entablature; the width of the space between the columns, which is 3.19 metres, would make arches more likely. Not all of the basilica was excavated; the first part, about four columns wide, were dug up underneath the church square and the stairway of Santa Maria del Fiore.

=== Dimensions ===
This conclusion is due to the finding of the foundations and the arcades that were attached to the front of Santa Reparata at a distance of 13 metres from the façade of the current cathedral. Including this area, the measurements of Santa Reparata appeared to be remarkable: a length of 58,5 metres on the inside, including the apse, a width of 25 to 26 metres for the oblique north wall. Santa Maria del Fiore is 153 metres long, about 38 metres wide, the length of the crossing nave is 90 metres, the height up to the lantern is 86.7 metres.

=== Mosaic pavement ===
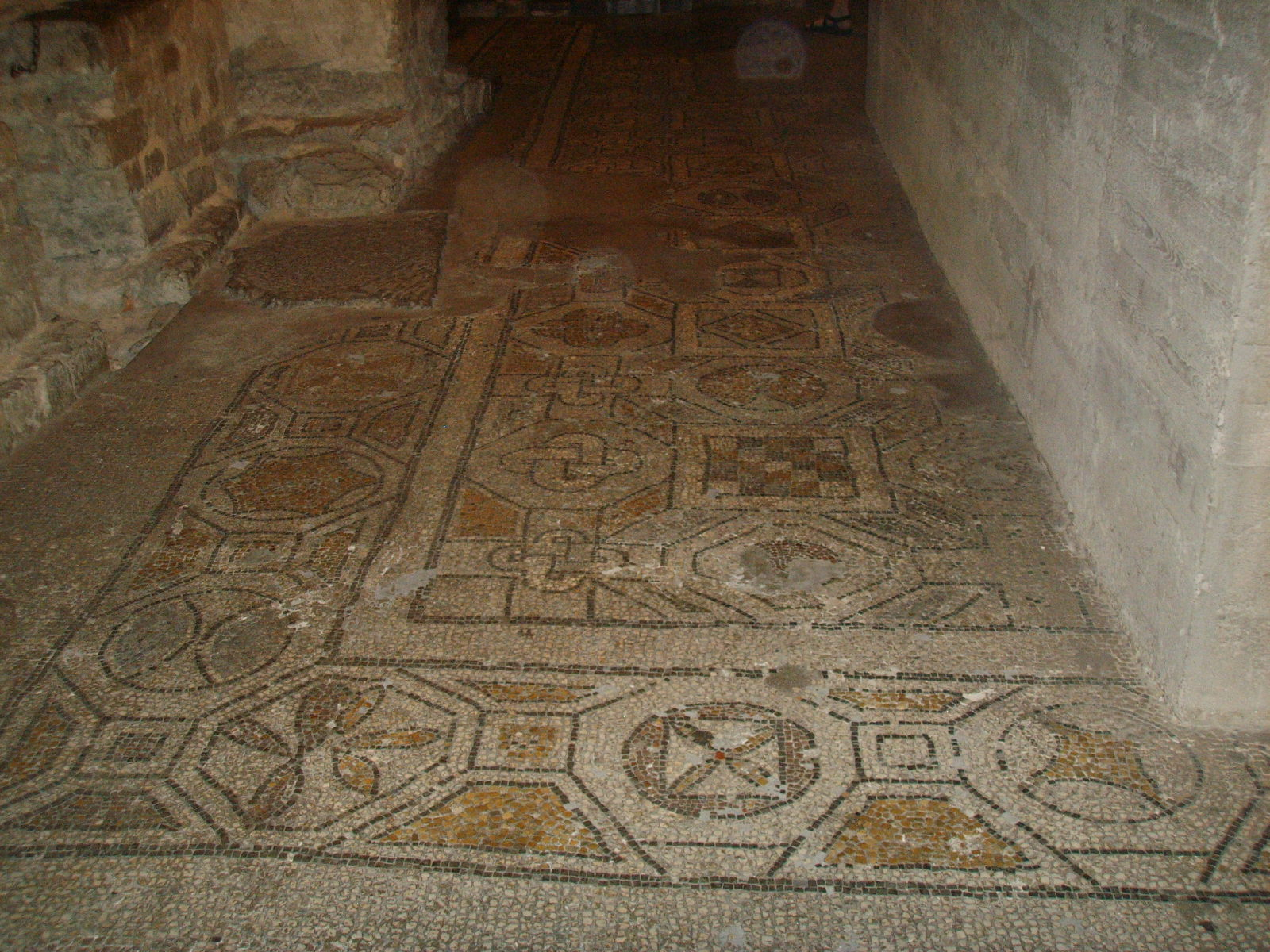
Excavated mosaic pavement

The most significant find is the great mosaic which paved all of the basilica, it was found in the left nave, in most of the middle nave and also in the right nave. There are different designs next to each other, among which, next to the usual four leafed rosettes and nods in circles or octagons (accompanied by Christian symbols like a Latin cross and a goblet), is the especially intricate coats of arms with lozenges inscribed between them that take up most space in the middle nave; in it, an epigraph with the names of 14 sponsors is inscribed. The image of a peacock is of remarkable quality between (?) the emblem in the center of the adjacent panel with the name of the sponsor Obsequentius. The motifs of the pavement belong to the usual repertoire of the era of the Roman Empire (Solomon's nods appear in Florence in the mosaics of the building underneath the baptistery) and the juxtaposition of different panels is found in many other examples in the Adriatic area.

=== Florence in the 4th century ===
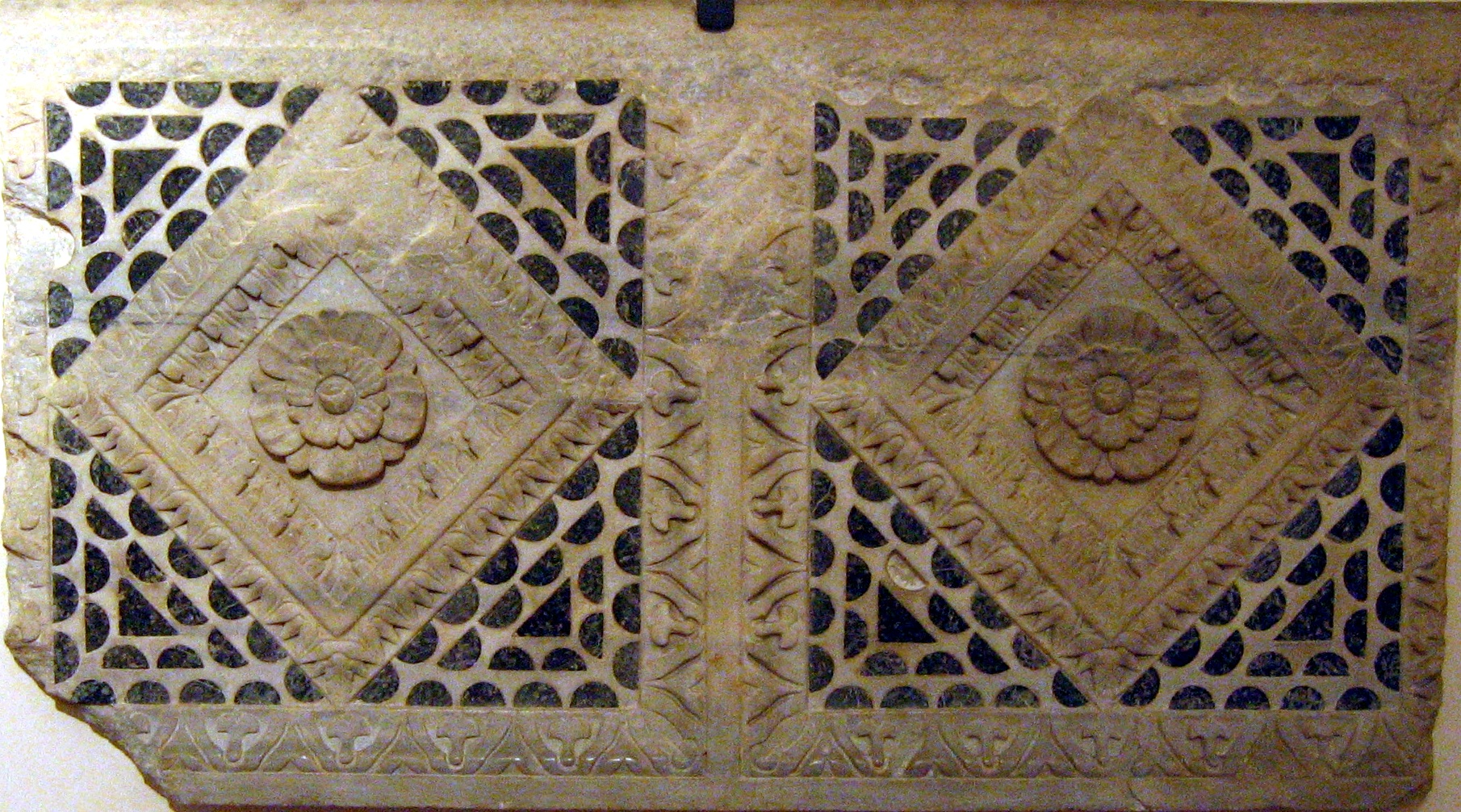
The baptismal font from Santa Reparata was preserved and is on exhibition at the Museo dell'Opera del Duomo.

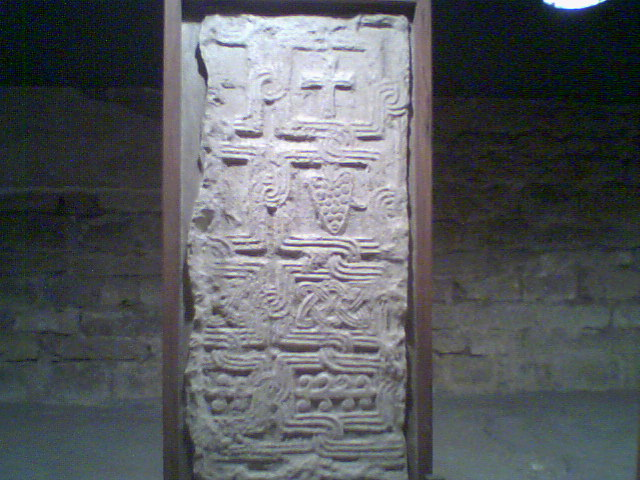
Bas-relief of Santa Reparata Church

From the dates that exist on the valuation of the found materials, a hypothesis can be formulated to date the mosaic between the fourth and the sixth century. It is still necessary to verify this hypothesis with a valuation of the historic point in time. There is the erroneous, rather diffuse opinion that Florence was entering a period of great decadence at the end of the fourth century, so much so that building activity could not be kept up to construct Santa Reparata or the baptistery. According to this erroneous opinion both could not have been built before the 6th or 7th century. The baptistery was considered to be of the Lombard age because it was dedicated to the baptist. However, the existence of such decadence has been disputed, because in 366 Florence was the capital of a vast province and united Tuscany and Umbria, due to the administrative reform by Diocletian and, until 315, it has been the seat of a bishop.

The city was anyway of primary importance and the central power certainly did not neglect it, also because its strategic position at a point where the Via Cassia crossed the river Arno winding its way to Rome. Lognes Pegna said that because during about half of the fourth century the rich people of Florence preferred to abandon Florence to defend themselves from an overly greedy fiscal authority and to evade taxes from administrative officers who took on personal responsibility to collect taxes, the rich landowners abandoned their houses and retired to the country. These town houses then ended as ruins.

Villas like the one found underneath the baptistery, according to Lopes Pegna, were probably occupied by plebeians, small craftsmen or by merchants. Also, this very building, at the time of the attack of the Ostrogoths, was protected by the Porta ad aquilonem, and must have been in a position especially exposed to various attacks and devastations by the barbarians, who threw themselves against the north gate in August 405 or 406. In this respect, Busignani objects that it cannot be understood why the attack of the Ostrogoths should have been concentrated in this point at the north gate.

It is known that the troops of the Ostrogoths were split up into three parts, of which two were camping on the hills of Fiesole while the third wing attacked Florence besieging it from every side.

With respect to the Roman walls at the north side, from the excavations of 1971 to 1972 it has been cleared up that the area of the wall that lies between the Porta da aquilonem and the area of Santa Maria del Fiore was already down in the imperial age. This discovery explains that the city had to be fortified further, which was done in the second half of the fourth century when the barbaric attackers began to really frighten Florence. This must have been the situation of the city when Ambrose, bishop of Milan, came to Florence in 393 and founded the basilica of San Lorenzo, outside the city gate ad aquilonem, but still protected in a certain way.

The victory over Radagaisus must have given Florence a new vital impulse and Christianisation was spurred when Ambrose announced the victory over the barbarians. All that needs to be kept in mind when in the years following the victory there was a new zeal in the construction of religious buildings. According to Busignani, the new grand basilica and the baptistery in front of it must have been constructed in a united effort within a programme of a range that required efficient structures within the city.

The truce lasted about a century and a half, until the Greek-gothic war (according to Davidsohn volume 1, p. 81). The buildings of the city did not suffer damage in this new war, when the armed encounter took place in Mugello, next to Scarperia.

It is certain that from the middle of the above-mentioned century on, between the years of Stilicho and Radagaisus and the years of Justinian and Totila, there was a progressive and important impoverishment of the population of Florence, as well as in all Italy. This impoverishment, that started after the fall from power of Radagaisus, confirmed the premature dating of the basilica and the baptistery. According to Busignani the baptistery is so atypical in its architectural structure that it could not be explained if not in tight closeness to classical Roman architecture, and because the basilica had to be, according to logic, earlier than the construction of the baptismal church, a dating according to the victory of 405 - 406 became necessary.

== History ==
=== Late Antiquity ===
Ever since the 3rd century there was an area in the north of Florence which was dedicated to Christianity and up to the Middle Ages represented the most important religious center of the city. From the 6th century onwards, a building complex called 'the sacred axis' was constructed in east–west direction (from the Piazza dell'Olio to the area of the apsis of the Duomo), which was traditionally considered the cult area in Late Antiquity, protected by existing Roman walls. The place included the Bishop's palace, the Baptistery of San Giovanni, a hospital, a parsonage, a graveyard, and three churches: Salvatore al Vescovo, San Michele Visdomini and Santa Reparata. The main point within the sacred axis was Santa Reparata, a sacral building of paleo-Christian origin which was probably the first construction of this building complex. The bones of Saint Zenobius (born about 328) were transferred to Santa Reparata at an unidentified time (according to most scientists it happened in the 9th century). At this time Santa Reparata became the new seat of the bishop, which had been in Basilica of San Lorenzo before that time.

=== First rebuilding after the Gothic War ===
The Gothic Wars finished in 554. This long war period reduced Florence to a miserable state. Under the Lombards Florence lost its supremacy over Tuscia in favour of Lucca, while the historic enemy Fiesole also took power. Tradition wants it that Florence was restored by Charlemagne, even if it is more correct to talk of a rebirth (in fact it was celebrated as such at the time). And now it is logical enough to locate the first rebuilding of Santa Reparata in this age of rebirth.

The excavations have cast light on a new basilica above the paleo-Christian church with characteristics that are very diverse, even though the walls on the perimeter were still the same (or better, they were in part reconstructed on top of the antique ones). So the structural organism changed as described below.

Structural changes during the Carolingian time
- instead of the 14 pairs of columns seven pairs of pilasters were built
- two chapels were attached at the sides of the apsis, which looked much like a crossing nave, in this area the space in between the pilasters also widened which further added to the impression of a crossing nave.
- the excavation of the apsis has revealed the creation of a crypt

After the structural changes during the Carolingian time (8th to 9th century), the new Santa Reparata represented an episode of new type in architecture, because it articulates structures that changes the undefined space of paleo-Christian churches (see textbox). It possessed a structure similar to a crossing nave. As far as the use of the crypt goes, that was realized in this basilica at this time, It came into existence and spread during the Carolingian age, tied to a cult of martyrs and saints that frequently were excavated at the time and placed inside the church: almost all scientists believe that the bones of Saint Zenobius have been transferred at this time.

Together with the bones of Saint Zenobius, the see of the bishop was probably moved from San Lorenzo to Santa Reparata. It is impossible to know if the transfer was at the time of bishop Andrew (869 to 890), as some claim. It is documented that Andrew dedicated the altar in Santa Reparata, which would confirm the Carolingian chronology of the second rebuilding of the basilica. Andrew was an important personality for the Florentine rebirth under the successors of Charlemagne, given that in 871 he was an envoy of Louis II (Davidsohn volume 1 p. 131) and as such sat in judgement together with margrave of Tuscia, Adalbert, four years later, in 875; he obtained immunity for the territory of his own diocese from the emperor Charles the Bald; and in the year 876 he was in Pavia among the 18 bishops that elected the same Charles II the Bald King of Italy.

=== 9th or 10th century: addition of two towers ===
Probably, in the 9th century, after the reconstruction (or possibly, but according to Busigani less probable, in the 10th century) there were two towers or campanili at the side of the apsis of Santa Reparata; of these the excavations have found the massive foundations. It is likely that the towers had defensive functions, because in the 10th century there were frequent invasions on behalf of the Magyars into Tuscany. In Northern Italy, the use of the two towers at the flanks of the apsis is only found at the end of the 10th century; in France, Switzerland and Germany it is documented until the first quarter of the 11th century and these are the examples the constructors drew from.

=== Additions in view of the Council of Florence ===
On 4 June 1055 pope Victor II opened the first council of Florence, where 120 bishops and the emperor Henry III were united, opened in Santa Reparata. Gerard de Bourgogne (deceased in 1061) had been the bishop of Florence for 10 years, and became pope under the name of Nicholas II without resigning from his see at Florence. The city underwent several sudden changes in status in the second half of the 6th decade of the 9th century: Florence went from città della marca (a provincial center) to città dell'impero ("imperial city") and then back again to città della marca (Volume 1, Davidsohn p. 231). It seems that in view of the council of 1055, several activities were carried out: widening of the crypt, adding of two apside at the sides of the major apsis, construction of an arcade, of which the foundations were found – the foundations of eight pilasters or columns, at about 13 metres outside the facade of Santa Maria del Fiore. In any case, although it is documented that Pope Nicholas II, who was present in his Florentine diocese from November 1059, consecrated the churches that were reconstructed to Santa Felicita and from San Lorenzo, we have no document relating to the consecration of Santa Reparata by the pope or bishop. But as far as the baptistery is concerned, there is an inscription on a panel from the 17th or 18th century, on which it is reported to be consecrated to San Giovanni on 6 November 1055. However, if the additions were made before the council, it seems likely that Nicholas II had consecrated Santa Reparata when he was still bishop. The apses are from the romanesque age because the way they are constructed in respect to the foundations of the two towers, especially the southern one, makes it likely that these were brought down at this occasion. The crypt also was enlarged in the romanesque age; the ceiling was carried by columns and its dimensions were widened until the entry of the two chapels on the side, where two stairways lead up to the presbytery.

As far as the arcade is concerned, little is known about it from the finding of the foundations of the columns. Still, with the added arcade, the space between the Baptistery and Santa Reparata is reduced to about 17 or 18 metres. The two columns of porphyry were originally placed at six metres distance from the eastern gate in memory of the occupation of the Balearic Islands in 1115 and stayed there until 1333.

It is likely that the facade of Santa Reparata was decorated with polychromous marble just like the baptistery. But, as Villani says, Santa Reparata at a certain point had to seem rough and too small for the new ambitions of Florence in the 13th century, so much so that in 1293 it was decided to reconstruct the building.

On 8 September 1296 the cornerstone was laid for the new cathedral, but the people of Florence continued to honor Santa Reparata so much so that in the middle of the 13th century the little apsis on the right side was equipped with a fresco with a pietà. At the time, the antique works at the level of 1.05 metres above the Roman groundlevel were covered by 85 cm of earth, on top of which the cobblestone pavement was laid at 1.90 metres above Roman ground level; 80 cm above is the marble pavement of Santa Maria del Fiore.
