= Basilica of San Lorenzo, Florence =

Catholic church in Tuscany, Italy

Basilica di San Lorenzo
- Basilica of Saint Lawrence
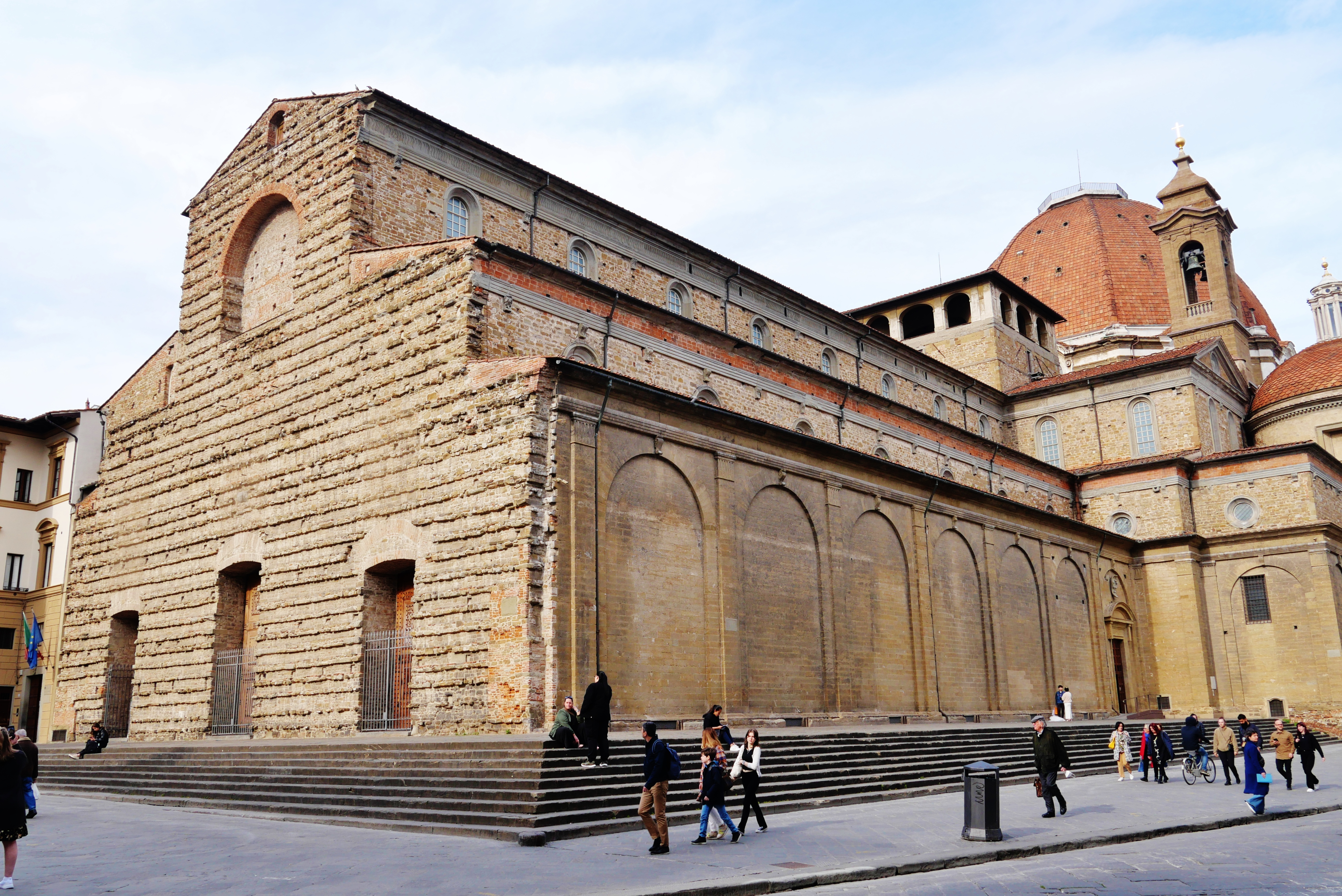

- Location in Florence
- 43°46′29.7″N 11°15′13.9″E
- Location: Florence, Tuscany
- Country: Italy
- Denomination: Catholic Church
- Sui iuris church: Latin Church

History
- Status: Minor basilica
- Dedication: Saint Lawrence
- Consecrated: 393

Architecture
- Architect(s): Filippo Brunelleschi, Michelangelo
- Architectural type: Church
- Style: Renaissance
- Groundbreaking: 15th century
- Completed: 1470

Administration
- Archdiocese: Archdiocese of Florence

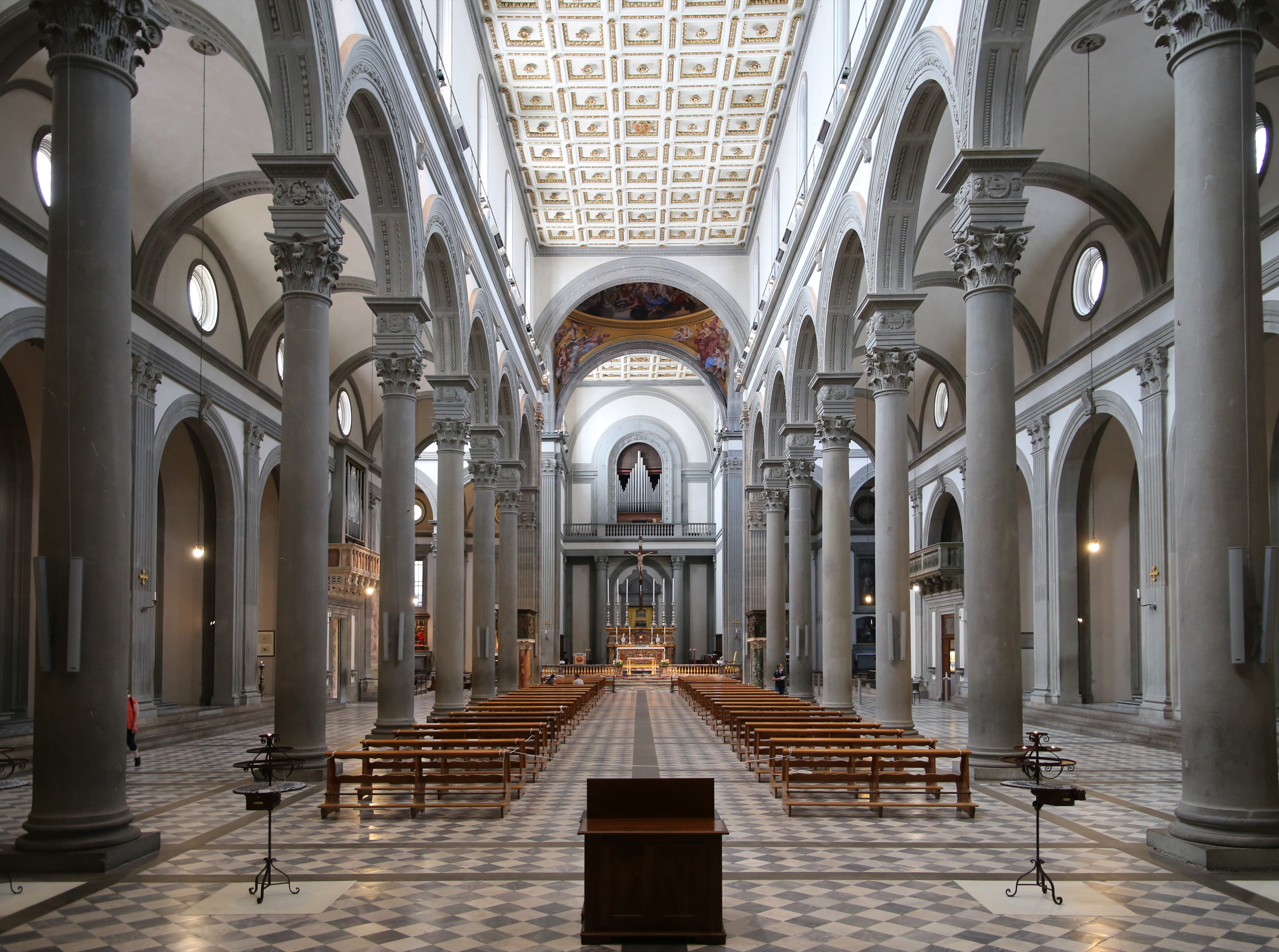
Interior looking toward the high altar

The Basilica di San Lorenzo (Basilica of Saint Lawrence) is one of the largest churches of Florence, Italy, situated at the centre of the main market district of the city, and it is the burial place of all the principal members of the Medici family from Cosimo il Vecchio to Cosimo III. It is one of several churches that claim to be the oldest in Florence, having been consecrated in 393 AD, at which time it stood outside the city walls. For three hundred years it was the city's cathedral, before the official seat of the bishop was transferred to Santa Reparata.

San Lorenzo was the parish church of the Medici family. In 1419, Giovanni di Bicci de' Medici offered to finance a new church to replace an eleventh-century Romanesque rebuilding. Filippo Brunelleschi, the leading Renaissance architect of the first half of the fifteenth century, was commissioned to design it, but the building, with alterations, was not completed until after his death. The church is part of a larger monastic complex that contains other important architectural and artistic works: the Old Sacristy (Sagrestia Vecchia) by Brunelleschi, which has interior decoration and sculpture by Donatello; the Laurentian Library (Biblioteca Laurentiana) by Michelangelo; the Medici Chapels (Cappelle Medicee), two structures that include the New Sacristy (Sagrestia Nuova) based on Michelangelo's designs; and the larger Cappella dei Principi ('Chapel of the Princes') being a collaboration between the family and architects.

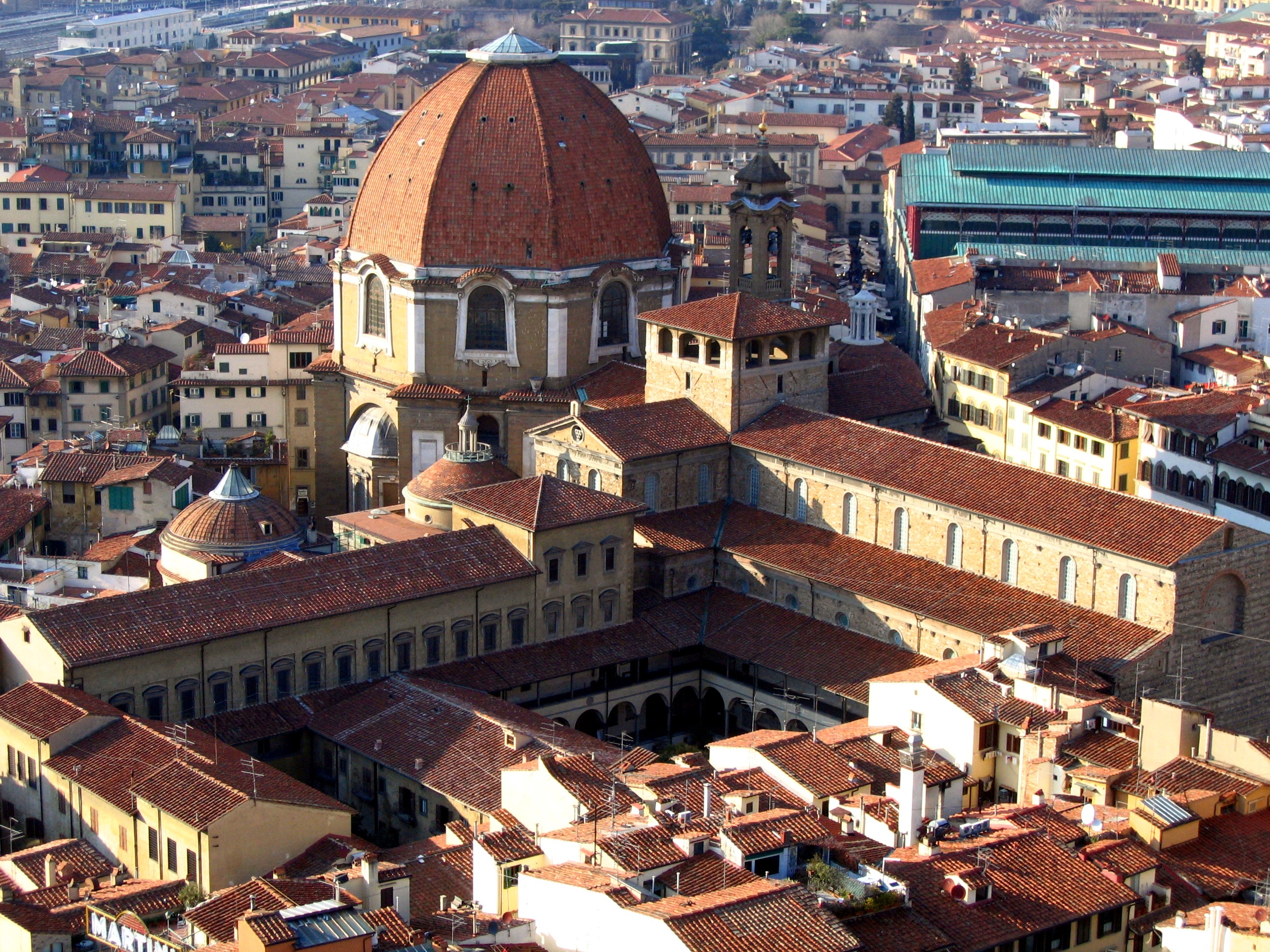
The cruciform basilica with the vast domed apsidal Medici Chapel; in the cloister is the Laurentian Library

== History ==
The earliest Christian church built on this site was consecrated in 393 AD by Saint Ambrose, who also named the first bishop of Florence. After three hundred years it lost its status as the city's cathedral to Santa Reparata (on which ground today's Santa Maria del Fiore stands). The building was replaced in the 11th century by a basilica that was outdated again, when in 1418 the wealthiest citizens in the parish decided to rebuild it.

The present basilica of San Lorenzo is considered a milestone in the development of Renaissance architecture. The building has a complicated building history and was begun around 1419, under the direction of Filippo Brunelleschi. Lack of funds slowed the construction and forced changes to the original design. By the early 1440s only its sacristy (now called the Old Sacristy) had been worked on because that was being paid for by the Medici. In 1442, the Medici stepped in to take over financial responsibility of the church as well. After Brunelleschi's death in 1446, the job was handed either to Antonio Manetti or to Michelozzo; scholars are uncertain which. Although the building was largely completed by 1459 in time for a visit to Florence by Pope Pius II, the chapels along the right-hand aisles were still under construction during the 1480s and 1490s.

By the time the building was completed, aspects of its layout and detailing no longer corresponded to the original plan. The principal difference is that Brunelleschi had envisioned the chapels along the side aisles to be deeper than those built and he intended them to resemble the chapels in the transept, the only part of the building that is known to have been completed as Brunelleschi designed it.

== The building in Renaissance architecture ==
San Lorenzo demonstrates many innovative features of the developing style of Renaissance architecture:

- a simple mathematical proportional relationship using the square aisle bay as a module and the nave bays in a 2-by-1 ratio
- the use of an integrated system of columns, arches, and entablatures, based on Roman classical models
- the use of classical proportions for the height of the columns
- a clear relationship between column and pilaster, the latter meant to be read as a type of embedded pier
- the use of spherical segments in the vaults of the side aisles
- the articulation of the structure in local pietra serena stone

According to one scholar, features such as the interior's Corinthian arcades and the ceiling's flat panels mark "a departure from the Gothic and a return to the Romanesque Proto-Renaissance."

At times, the design of San Lorenzo has met with criticism, particularly when compared with Santo Spirito, also in Florence, and which is considered to have been constructed more or less in conformity with Brunelleschi's ideas, even though he died before most of it was built. By the sixteenth century, Giorgio Vasari commented that along the nave, the columns should have been elevated on plinths. The steps along the aisles, supporting the pilasters, also have been considered to deviate from classical ideals.

== Outer and inner façades ==
The Medici pope Leo X gave Michelangelo the commission to design an outer façade of the basilica in white Carrara marble in 1518. Michelangelo made a large wooden model that shows how he adjusted the classical proportions of the façade, drawn to scale, after the ideal proportions of the human body, to the greater height of the nave.

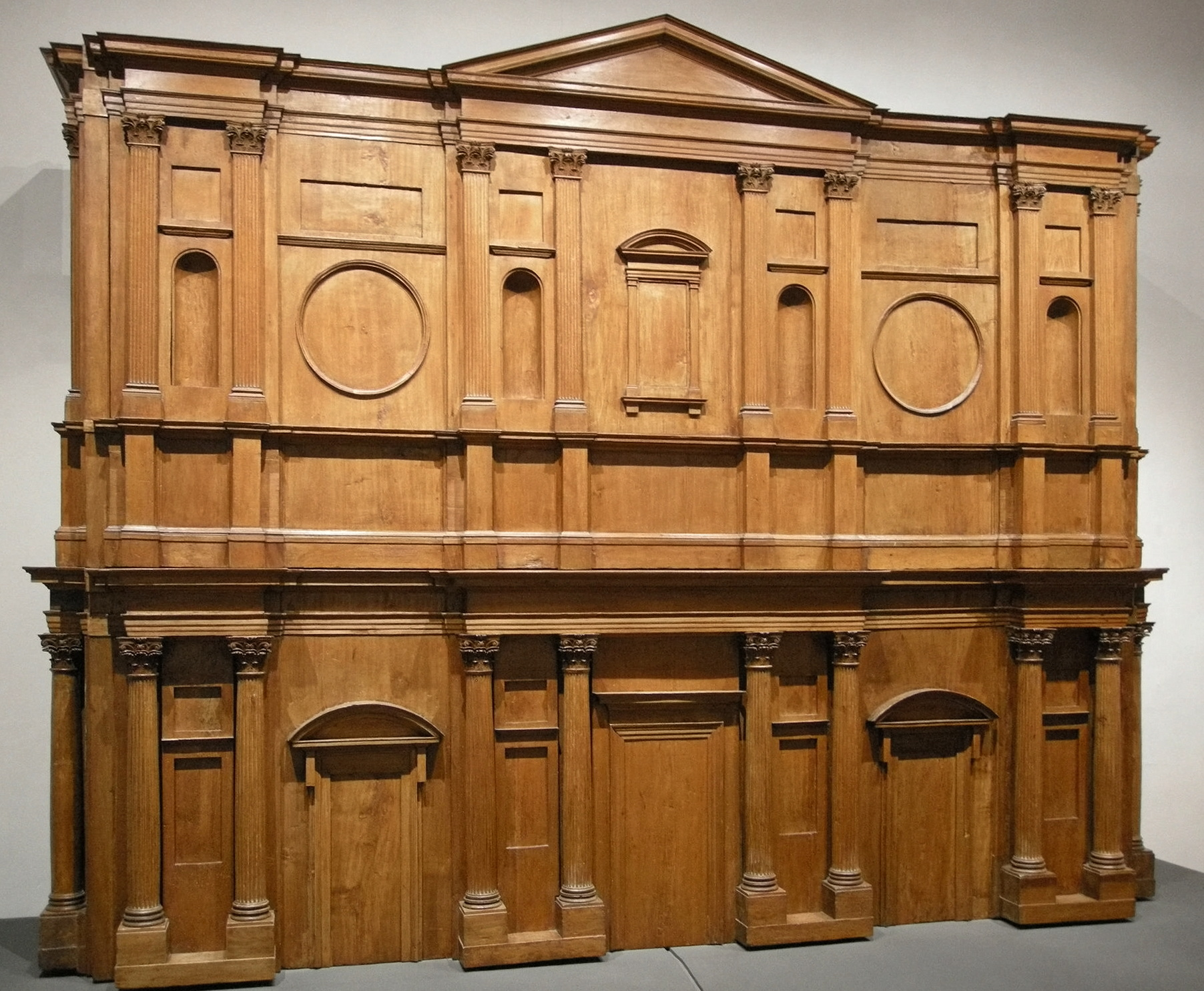
Michelangelo's model for the façade of the basilica

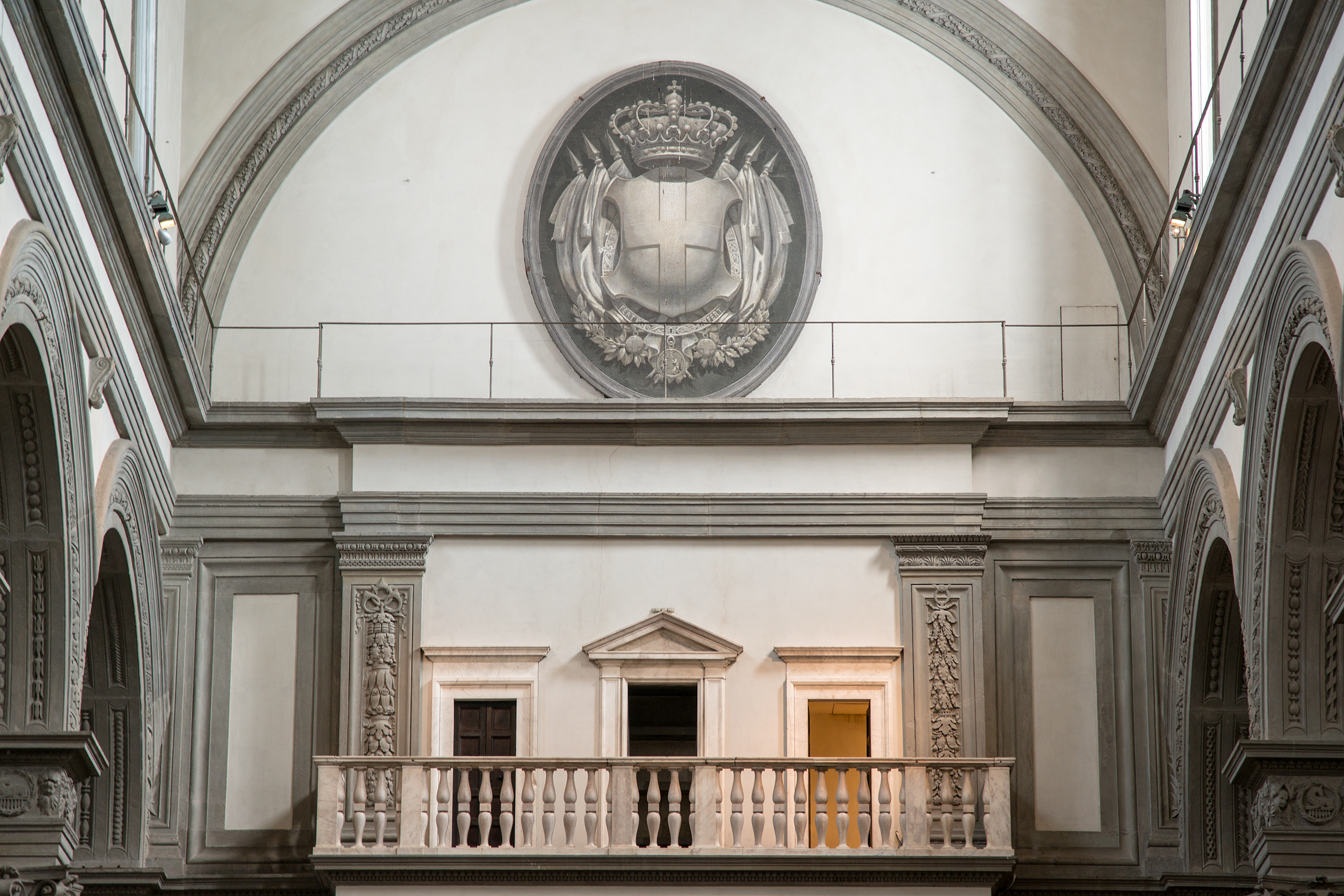
The balcony on the interior west wall designed by Michelangelo

Although the façade remained unbuilt, Michelangelo's large wooden model of it remains, held at the Casa Buonarroti in Florence.

Michelangelo did design and build the internal façade of the basilica which is seen from the nave looking back toward the entrances. It comprises three doors between two pilasters with garlands of oak and laurel and a balcony on two Corinthian columns.

In recent years, the association of "Friends of the Elettrice Palatina" and the Comune of Florence revisited the question of completing the outer façade of the basilica according to Michelangelo's designs. To assist with the public debate, a computerized reconstruction was projected onto the plain brick façade in February 2007. As yet, no decision has been made regarding a project use Michelangelo's design to build the outer façade following his wooden model.

The campanile dates from 1740.

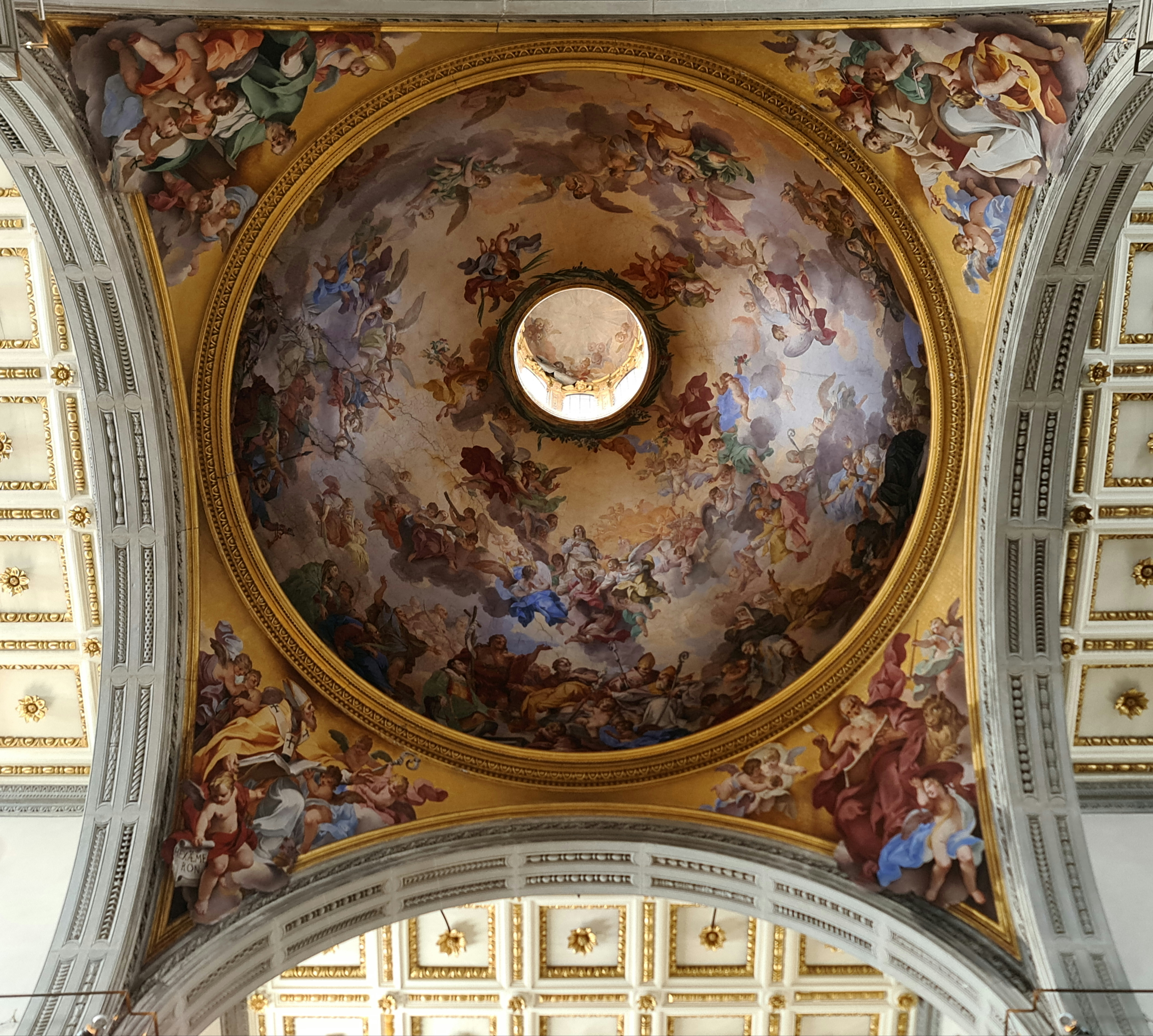
Glory of Florentine Saints on the interior of the dome over the crossing

== Old Sacristy ==
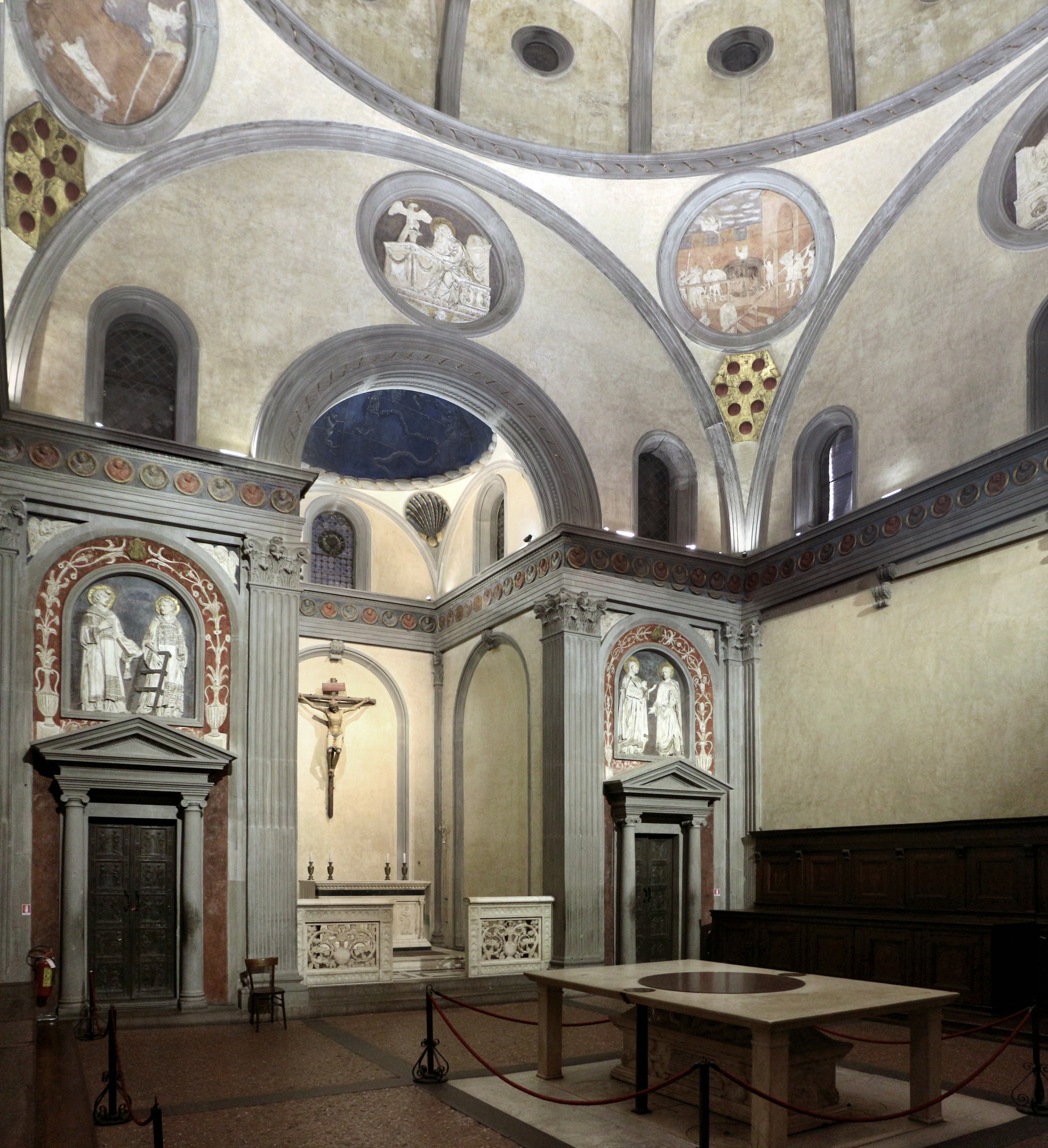
The Sagrestia Vecchia

Opening off the south transept of the basilica is the square, domed space, the Sagrestia Vecchia, or Old Sacristy. This was designed by Brunelleschi (1377–1446), is the oldest part of the present church and is the only part completed in Brunelleschi's lifetime. It contains the tombs of several members of the Medici family. It was composed of a sphere on top of a cube, the cube acting as the human world and the sphere as the heavens.

== New Sacristy ==
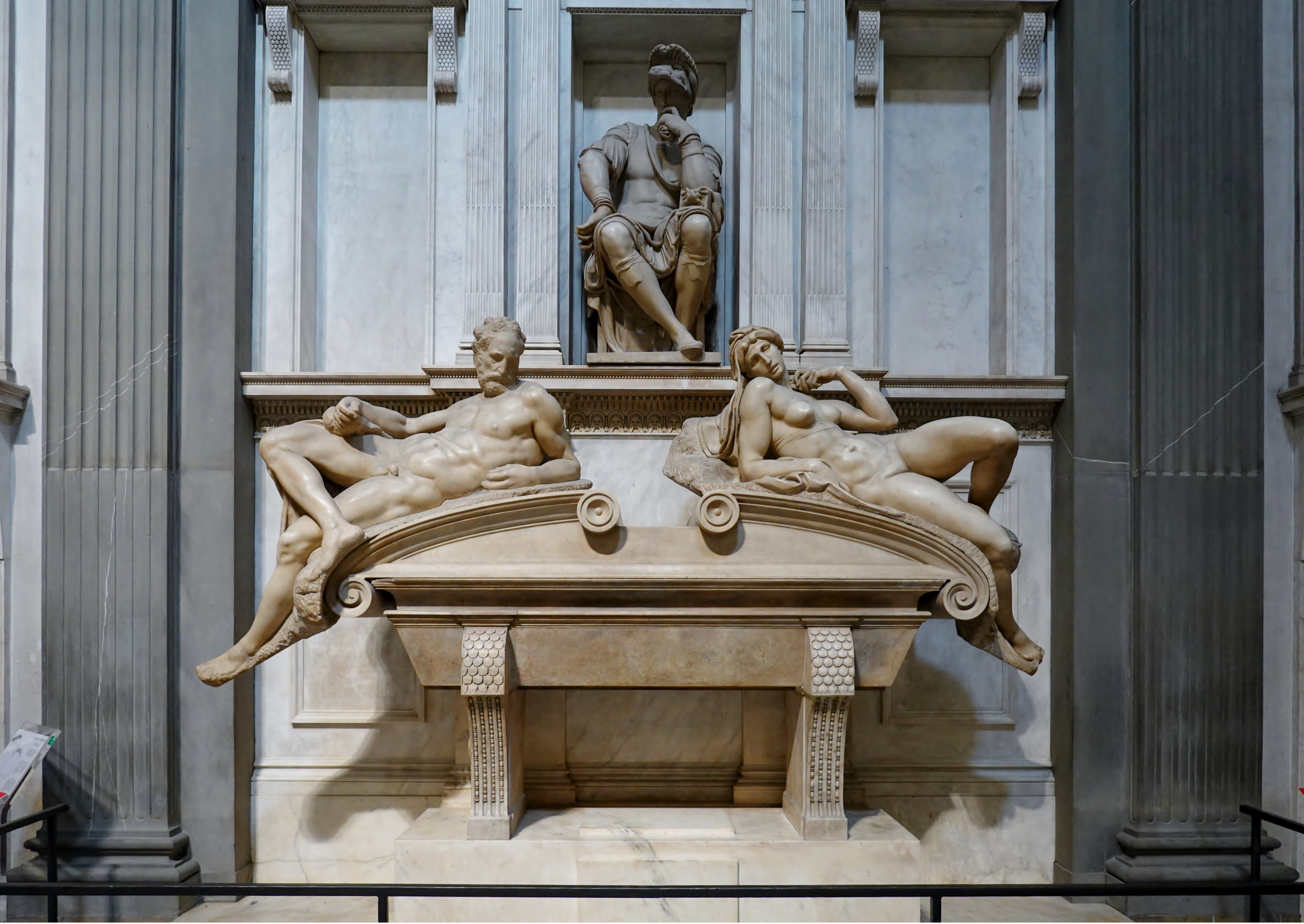
Tomb of Lorenzo de' Medici, Duke of Urbino, by Michelangelo in the New Sacristy

Opposite the Old Sacristy in the north transept of the basilica is the Sagrestia Nuova or New Sacristy, begun in 1520 by Michelangelo, who also designed the Medici tombs within it. That the architect of a building also designed the interior furnishings is a historical novelty in European architecture which is driven by Michelangelo's being a sculptor by training. The New Sacristy is composed of three registers topped by a coffered pendentive dome. The articulation of the interior walls may be described as early examples of Renaissance Mannerism (see Michelangelo's ricetto in the Laurentian Library). The combination of pietra serena pilasters on the lower register is carried through to the second register; however, in Mannerist fashion, architectural elements "seem impossible", creating suspense and tension that is evident in this example.

Michelangelo completed most of the statuary for the New Sacristy as well; however, the statues of the two patron saints planned to accompany the Medici Madonna which were planned for placement on the main wall and the sculptural elements of the two sarcophagi were left undone when the Pope redirected him to another project, the political situation in Florence changed, and changes later occurred in the papal succession. Although the New Sacristy was vaulted by 1524, these circumstances, the temporary exile of the Medici in 1527, the death of Pope Clement VII, and the permanent departure of Michelangelo for Rome in 1534, meant that Michelangelo never finished the project and he refused to direct completion.

The statues Michelangelo had carved by the time of his departure had not been put in place and were left in disarray within the chapel. In 1545, they were installed by Niccolò Tribolo. By order of Cosimo I de' Medici, the remaining work was completed by 1555 by Giorgio Vasari and Bartolomeo Ammannati.

In the biography of Michelangelo published in 1553 by his disciple Ascanio Condivi, which is reportedly based largely on Michelangelo's own recollections, Condivi gives the following description of the sculptures that were planned for the sarcophagi:

The statues are four in number, placed in a sacristy ... the sarcophagi are placed before the side walls, and on the lids of each there recline two big figures, larger than life, to wit, a man and a woman; they signify Day and Night and, in conjunction, Time which devours all things... And in order to signify Time he planned to make a mouse, having left a bit of marble upon the work (which [plan] he subsequently did not carry out because he was prevented by circumstances), because this little animal ceaselessly gnaws and consumes just as time devours everything.

=== Discovery of concealed corridor ===
In 1975, a concealed corridor with drawings by Michelangelo on its walls was discovered under the New Sacristy.

In 1527 the citizens of Florence rebelled against the Medici; Michelangelo supported them. After the Medici recaptured the city in 1530, Pope Clement VII, a Medici, sentenced Michelangelo to death. It is thought that Michelangelo hid for two months in a small chamber under the Medici chapels in San Lorenzo with light from just a tiny window, making many charcoal and chalk drawings which remained hidden until the room was rediscovered in 1975, and opened to small numbers of visitors in 2023. Michelangelo was eventually pardoned by the Medici and the death sentence lifted, so that he could complete work on the Sistine Chapel and the Medici family tombs. He left Florence for Rome in 1534.

== Biblioteca Laurenziana ==
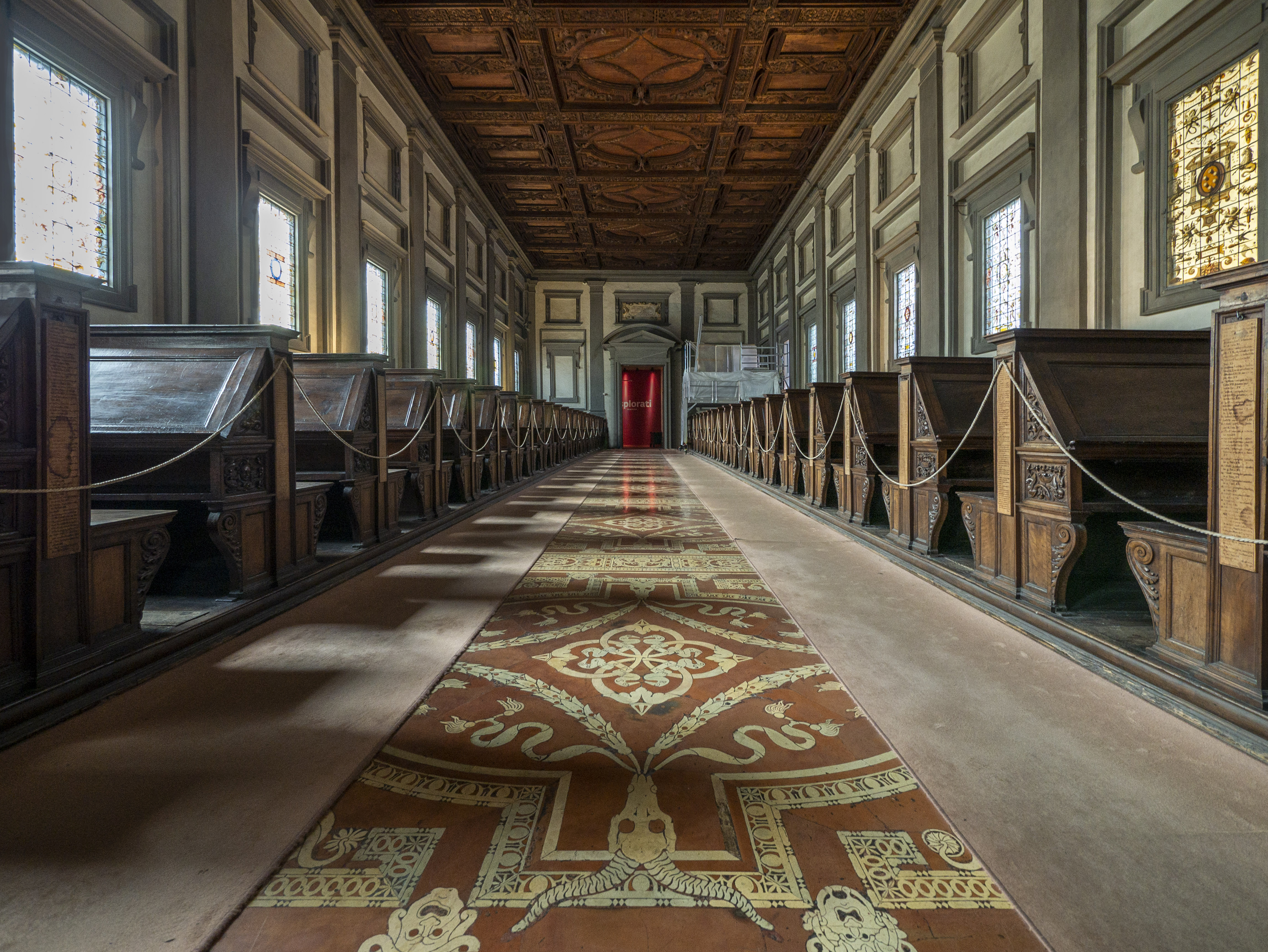
The Laurentian Library by Michelangelo

== Cappelle Medicee ==
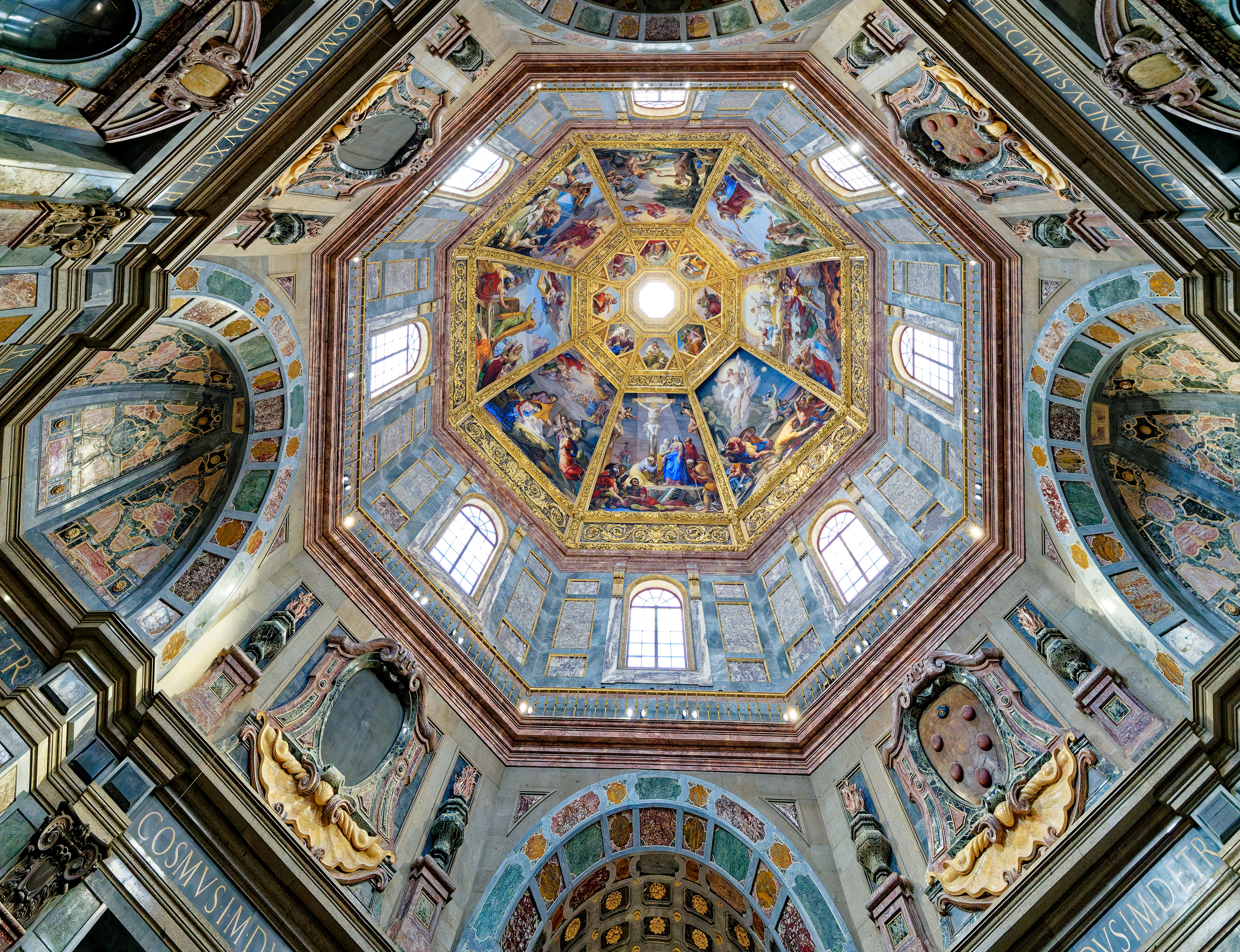
Interior of the dome of the Cappella dei Principi

The most celebrated and grandest part of San Lorenzo is the Cappelle Medicee (Medici Chapels) in the apse. The Medici were still paying for it when, in 1743, the last living member of the family, Anna Maria Luisa de' Medici, died. In 1742, she had commissioned Vincenzo Meucci to paint the Glory of Florentine Saints, a fresco, inside the cupola. Approximately fifty lesser members of the Medici family are buried in the crypt. The final design (1603–1604) was by Bernardo Buontalenti, based on models of Alessandro Pieroni and Matteo Nigetti. Above is the Cappella dei Principi ('Chapel of the Princes'), a great but awkwardly domed octagonal hall where the grand dukes of Tuscany are buried. The style shows Mannerist eccentricities in its unusual shape, broken cornices, and asymmetrically sized windows. In the interior, the ambitious decoration with coloured marble overwhelms the attempts at novel design. Its centre was supposed to feature the Holy Sepulchre, moved from Jerusalem, although attempts to buy and, failing that, to steal it failed.^{Ref.?}

== Cappella Corbelli ==
The Corbelli Chapel, in the southern transept, contains a monument by the sculptor Giovanni Dupré to the wife of Count Moltke-Hvitfeldt, formerly Danish ambassador to the Court of Naples.

== Works of art ==
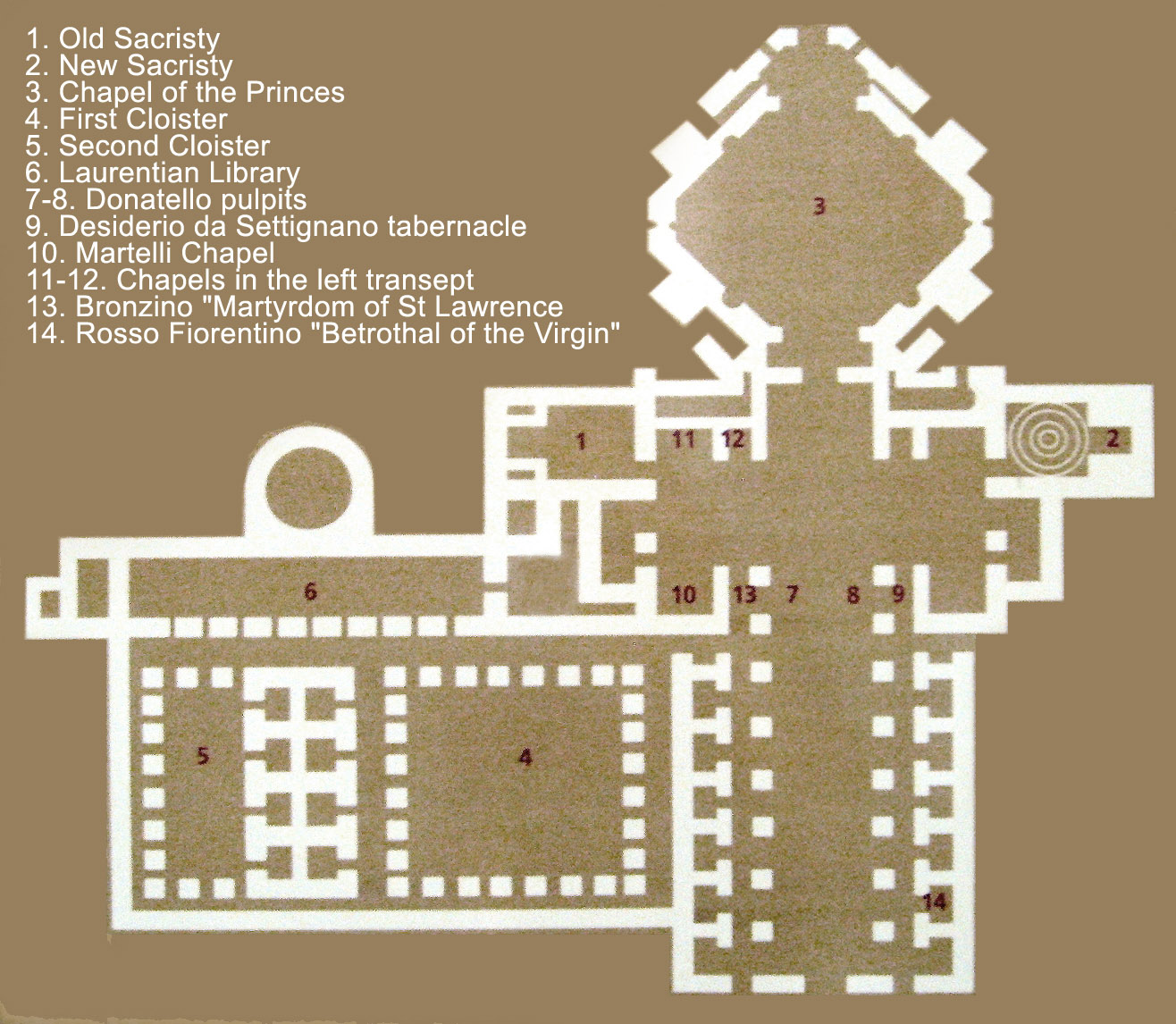
Plan of the church complex with legend

Counterclockwise from the east portal

- Rosso Fiorentino – Marriage of the Virgin (oil on canvas) in the second of the north aisle chapels
- Desiderio da Settignano – Pala del Sacramento (tabernacle): north aisle
- Donatello – bronze reliefs of two pulpits (his last works): nave
- Michelangelo – Medici Madonna, main wall and statues among the two tombs on the side walls of the New Sacristy
- Antonio del Pollaiuolo – Crucifix (cork): south transept chapel
- Donatello – frieze, reliefs, tondi, and bronze doors of the Sagrestia Vecchia
- Andrea del Verrocchio – Tomb of Giovanni and Piero de' Medici (bronze, marble): Sagrestia Vecchia
- Fra Filippo Lippi – Annunciation (altarpiece): Martelli Chapel in the left transept
- Bronzino – The Martyrdom of Saint Lawrence (fresco): south aisle
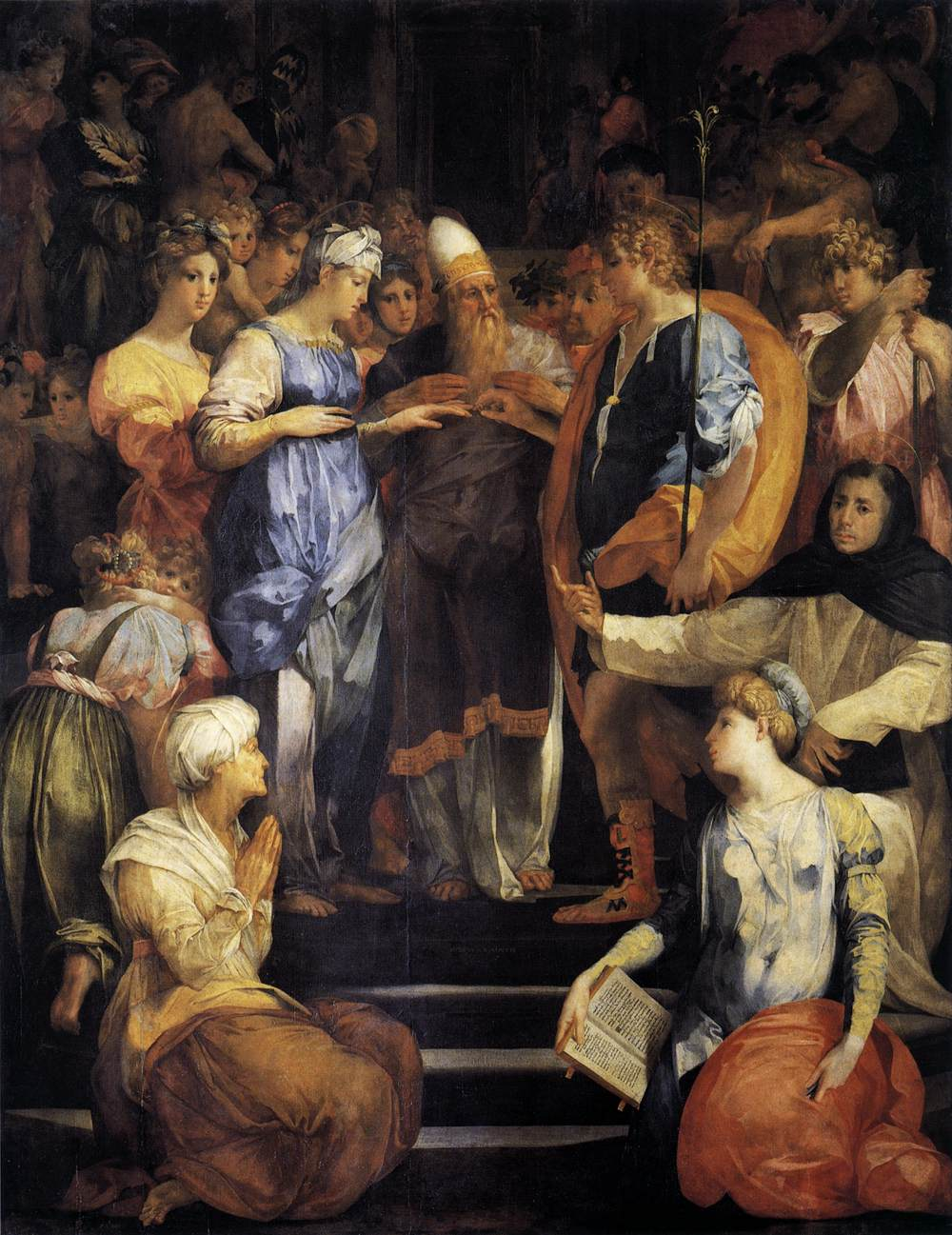
Rosso Fiorentino, Marriage of the Virgin, 1523

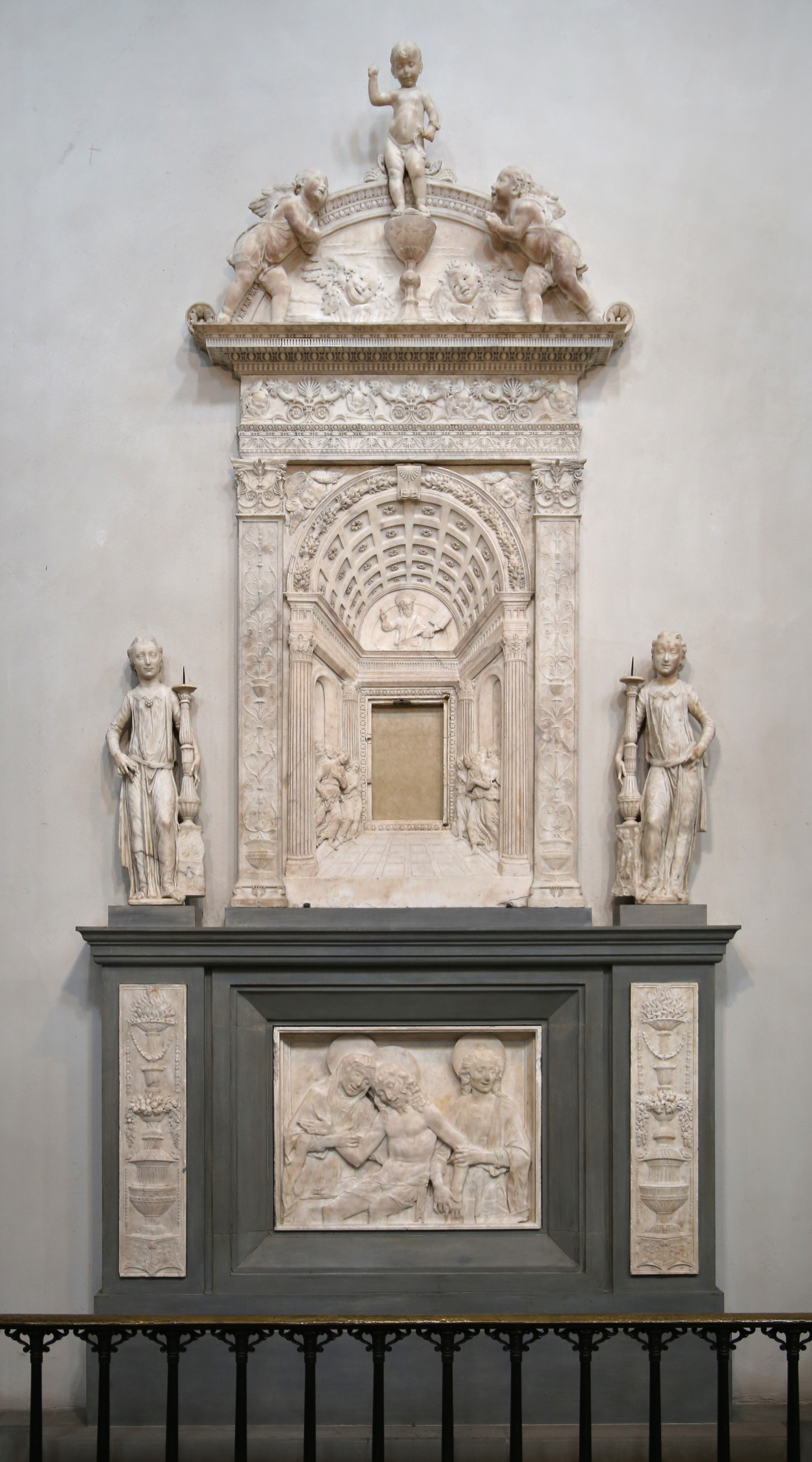
Desiderio da Settignano, San Lorenzo Tabernacle, 1490–1510

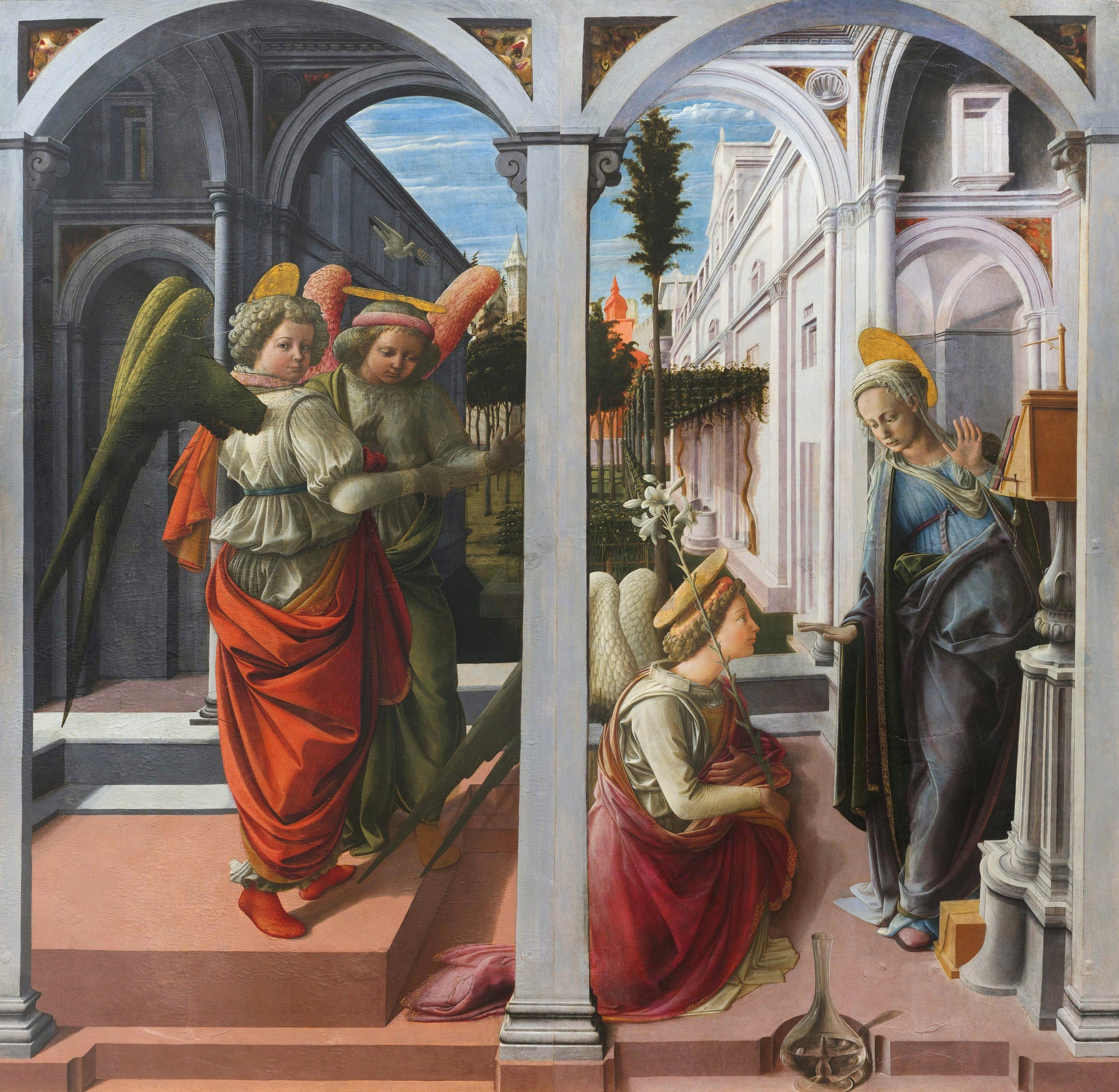
Fra Filippo Lippi, Martelli Annunciation, c. 1445

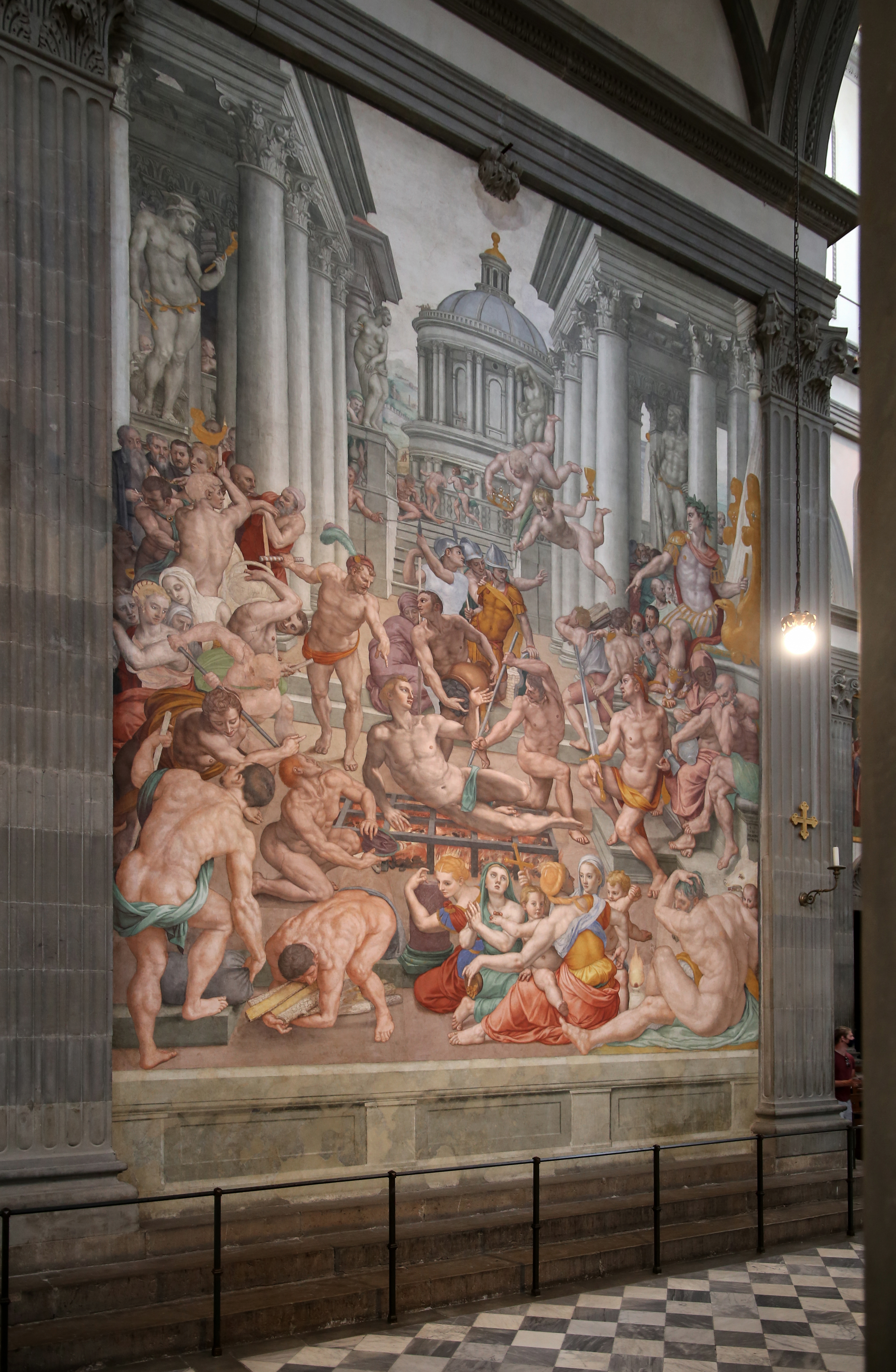
Bronzino, The Martyrdom of Saint Lawrence, 1565–1568

== Funerary monuments ==
- Bernardo Cennini (south transept)
- Donatello (north transept)
- Francesco Landini (south aisle)
- Niccolò Martelli (north transept)
- Cosimo de' Medici (in front of the high altar)
- Cosimo I de' Medici (Cappella dei Principi)
- Cosimo II de' Medici (Cappella dei Principi)
- Cosimo III de' Medici (Cappella dei Principi)
- Ferdinando I de' Medici (Cappella dei Principi)
- Ferdinando II de' Medici (Cappella dei Principi)
- Ferdinando III de' Medici (crypt)
- Francesco I de' Medici (Cappella dei Principi)
- Giovanni di Bicci de' Medici (Sagrestia Vecchia)
- Giovanni di Cosimo de' Medici (Sagrestia Vecchia)
- Giuliano di Lorenzo de' Medici (Sagrestia Nuova)
- Giuliano di Piero de' Medici (Sagrestia Nuova)
- Lorenzo I de' Medici (Sagrestia Nuova)
- Lorenzo II de' Medici (Sagrestia Nuova)
- Piero di Cosimo de' Medici (Sagrestia Vecchia)
- Nicolas Steno

== See also ==
- Medici Chapel
- Late medieval domes
- Italian Renaissance domes
