= Honoratus (disambiguation) =

Honoratus typically refers to Saint Honoratus of Arles, a 5th-century Christian archbishop.

Honoratus may also refer to:

- Honoratus (praefectus urbi 359), Praefectus urbi of Constantinople in 359 - 361
- Honoratus (praefectus urbi 394), Praefectus urbi of Constantinople in 394
- Servius the Grammarian, commentator on Vergil sometimes given the cognomen Honoratus in medieval manuscripts
- Honoratus of Amiens, 7th-century saint
