= Martelli Annunciation =

c. 1440 painting by Filippo Lippi

Annunciation
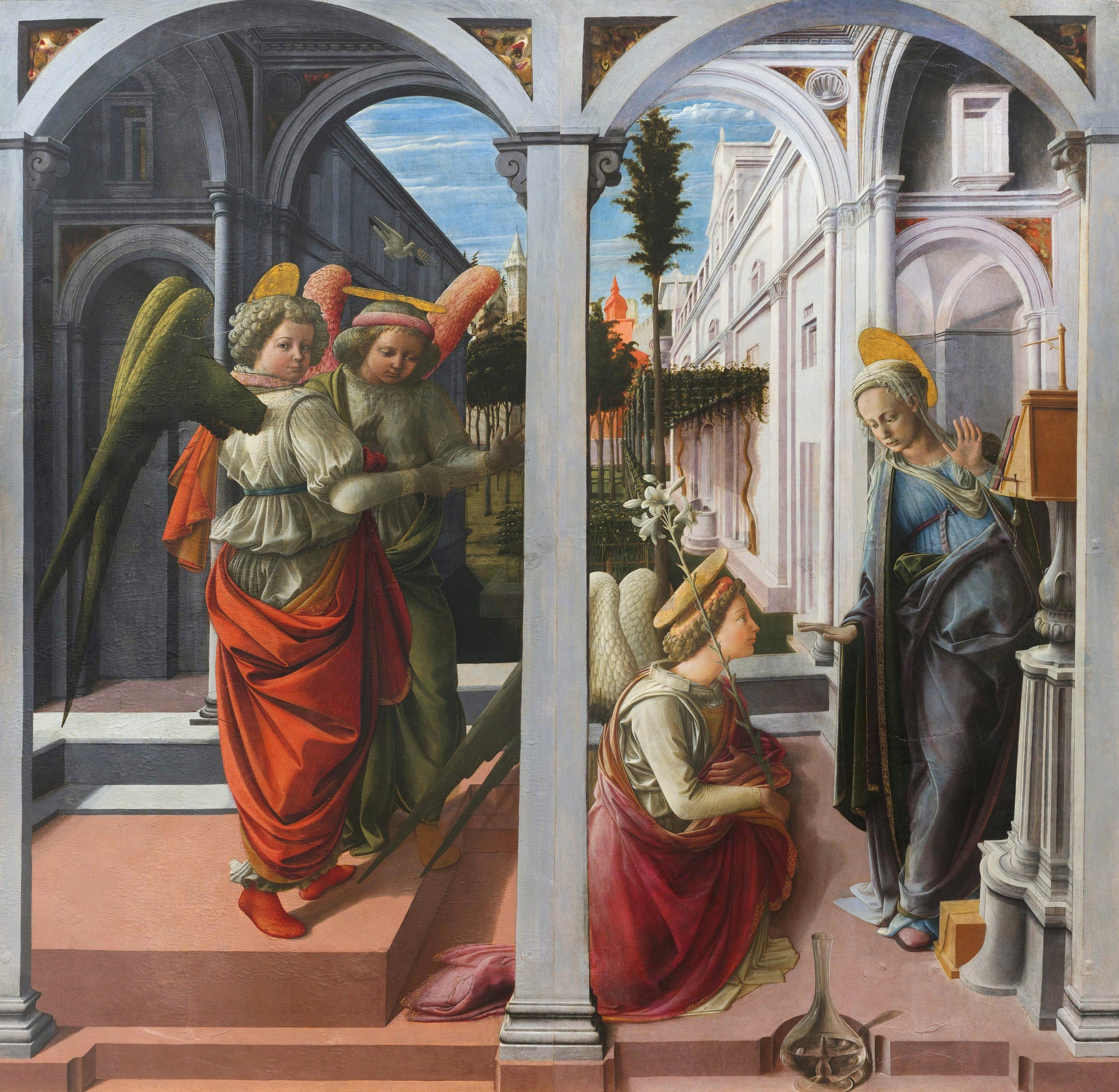
- Artist: Fra Filippo Lippi
- Year: c. 1440
- Medium: Tempera on panel
- Dimensions: 175 cm × 183 cm (69 in × 72 in)
- Location: Basilica di San Lorenzo, Florence

The Annunciation is a painting by Fra Filippo Lippi hung in the Martelli Chapel in the left transept of the Basilica di San Lorenzo, Florence, Italy. There are several paintings by Lippi of this same name.

This piece is about six feet by six feet. There is little known information about the painting's origin, although it is likely that it was originally commissioned for use in its current location. The dating (c. 1440) is based on the style and the presence of Saint Nicholas in the predella panels. The patron for this piece was notably Niccolò Martelli, a rich Florentine citizen who supported the reconstruction of the basilica and other parts of town.

The painting is considered the first known example of a squared altarpiece, without any traditional gothic decoration like pinnacles or cusps, in order to better match the simple architecture of the church, by Brunelleschi.

The panel is divided in two by a central column. It uses a geometrical perspective to show a complex architecture including several edifices and an open loggia. There are several elements suggesting the influence of Flemish painting, by which Lippi was influenced during his stay in Padua. These include the glass ampulla in the foreground, symbolizing the Holy Spirit.

== Visual analysis ==
In this piece there are three angels with wings who have come to meet with Mary. Gabriel is in front of two other angels kneeling while they stand. He is holding a lily which is symbol of purity. The dove flying above is a symbol of holy spirit.

The other two angels are looking off into the distance and not at Mary. The one closest to the audience is looking directly at us, as if acknowledging our presence. They wear woven red socks which are a similar color to their outer garments. Under this red drape they wear light grey outfits tied around their waists by a rope. Mary is wearing a darker grey garment with gold outlining and a light-colored headwear. She is looking down at Gabriel and motioning her hand toward him. She might be reaching her hand out to receive the branch from him, though he doesn't appear to be extending it out to her. There is an object to the right of her which appears to be a placeholder for books or other text.

They all have golden halos above their heads with teardrop-like patterns inside. These don't seem to be floating, but rather just placed on their heads somehow, without obeying laws of gravity. Their robes are all shown with very exaggerated drapery and wrinkles, which gives this piece depth and adds movement to the figures. This is a style of painting clothing that was popular during this era of the Renaissance.

The architecture painted displays a very classic Italian Renaissance style. There are two arches on either side of the subjects, and we look in through the arches to see the scene. Behind the figures there seems to be a garden of small trees and one which is almost as tall as the buildings surrounding it. This tree is positioned in line with Gabriel, who is standing directly in front of it. This may have been used to signify his importance and to make him a main subject, separating him from the other angels. The whole courtyard exhibits symmetry in the rows of trees and buildings that are on either side. The cityscape continues on in the background with churches and tall buildings poking above the skyline. The churches can be noticed by their pointed tower tops which stand taller than the other buildings.

A white bird flying behind the angels is wearing a golden halo as well. It appears to be emitting golden rays from its beak towards Gabriel and Mary. By Mary's feet is a cutout in the flooring just big enough for a vase of water to fit in it. The position of this vase creates a straight vertical line with the palm of Mary's hand. This brings the viewer's attention back to Mary.

The buildings and architecture have a great level of realism in this painting, but the figures' faces aren't extremely realistic. Their bodies show contrapposto, however, which makes their stance more natural.

The three scenes in the predella are similar to those in the Barbadori Altarpiece, from 1438.

== Theories ==
=== Carmelite influence ===
When Lippi was a member of the Order of Carmelites, it is told by Vasari that he was captured by barbarian pirates during his travels. Some did not believe this story, but when he returned to Florence, his paintings were famous. He was getting many commissions from the church and they would often lock him in dimly lit rooms to complete them. He eventually escaped, though he always owed a debt to the Carmelite Order. These feelings of having his freedom stripped by the church by locking him away may be portrayed in this paintings by having Gabriel not hand the branch, which according to Old Testament references symbolizes freedom, to Mary, despite her reaching out for it.
