= Bernardo Cennini =

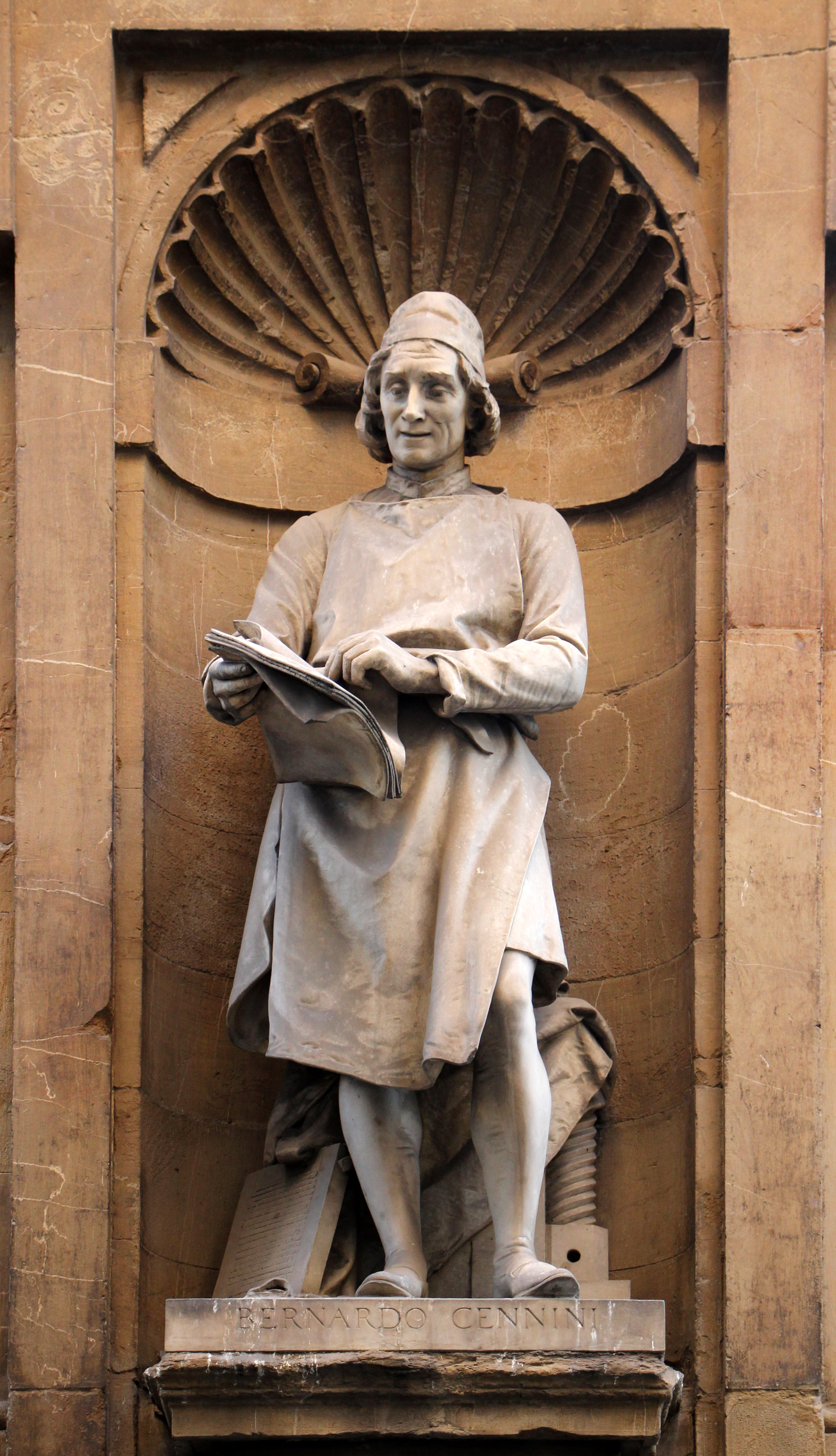
Nineteenth-century culture hero: Bernardo Cennini scans printing proofs in a niche of the Loggia del Mercato Nuovo, Florence.

Bernardo Cennini (Italian: [berˈnardo tʃenˈniːni]; 1414/15 – c. 1498) was an Italian goldsmith, sculptor and early printer of Florence. As a sculptor he was among the assistants to Lorenzo Ghiberti in the long project producing the second pair of doors—the Doors of Paradise—for the Battistero di San Giovanni. He produced the first book printed at Florence. The painter and author of a famous book on the crafts, Cennino d'Andrea Cennini, was a member of the same Florentine family.

== Works of sculpture and goldsmith ==
Representing his output as a sculptor-goldsmith is a cache of his sculptures in silver that are preserved in the Museo dell'Opera del Duomo, Florence. They include a high relief combining two New Testament episodes, The Announcement to Zachariah and the Visitation, which were Cennini's contribution to the silver altar of S. Giovanni, (formerly in the Baptistery), a project that was worked on by several generations of sculptors; the silver crosses for it are also by Cennini, and the corpus on the crucifix is attributed to him as well.

== Printer from moveable type ==
Hearing of the new process of printing by moveable type, and seeing some printed books, Cennini puzzled out the procedure for himself, cast his own type font and, working with his sons Pietro, a humanist poet and manuscript illuminator, and Domenico, produced the first of the incunabula printed at Florence, starting in 1471. The book was the commentary of Virgil, In Tria Virgilii Opera Expositio by the late fourth-century grammarian Maurus Servius Honoratus. In the first page of the book, Cennini commemorates his own invention, and at the conclusion is the triumphant Florentine boast: "Florentinis ingeniis nil ardui est," and the date 9 October 1471. The classical content was characteristic of the Florentine incunabula: "Early Florentine printing, in particular, shows a large output of classical texts and grammars and other humanistic works as opposed to the religious works that most other Italian cities of the time were producing." ("Florentine Printing of the Fifteenth Century" 2003).

== Visible remains of the Cennini family ==
The partly thirteenth-century Palazzo Cennini in via Faenza, the family's power center, is now largely rebuilt as a hotel. Via Faenza remained for a long period the locus for Florence's printers' shops. Bernardo Cennini is buried in the south transept of the basilica of San Lorenzo.
