= Justus Sustermans =

Flemish painter (1597–1681)

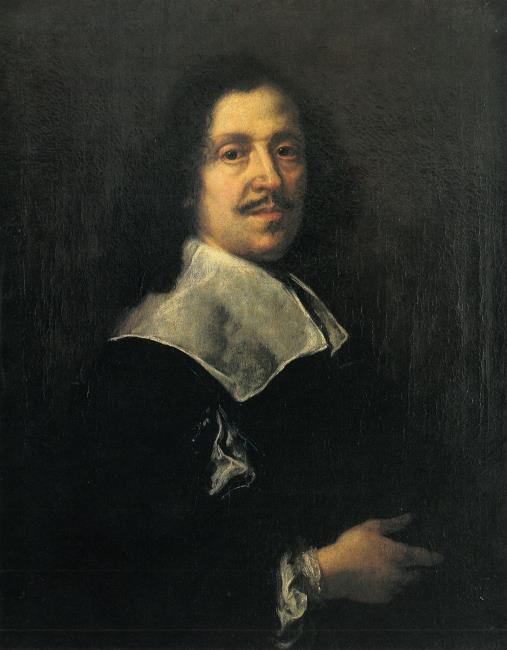
- Self-Portrait, c. 1660
- Born: 28 September 1597; Antwerp, Spanish Netherlands
- Died: 23 April 1681 (aged 83); Florence, Grand Duchy of Tuscany
- Known for: Painting

Justus Sustermans, Joost Sustermans or Suttermans, his given name Italianised to Giusto (28 September 1597 – 23 April 1681), was a Flemish painter and draughtsman who is mainly known for his portraits. He also painted history and genre paintings, still lifes and animals.

Sustermans is chiefly noted for his portraits of members of the Medici family as he was its court painter. The Holy Roman Emperor Ferdinand II invited him to Vienna to paint portraits of the Imperial family and granted Sustermans and his brothers patents of nobility. During his lifetime he was fêted as the finest portrait painter in Italy.

== Life ==
Justus Sustermans was born in Antwerp as the son of the tailor Frans Suttermans or Sustermans, originally from Bruges, and Esther Scheepmans. Justus was baptised in the Antwerp Cathedral on 28 September 1597. He was in 1609 registered as a pupil of Willem (or Gilliam) de Vos (a nephew of the painter Maerten de Vos) at the Antwerp Guild of Saint Luke. He left Antwerp for Paris in 1616, where he spent about two years in the workshop of Frans Pourbus the Younger, a prominent portrait painter from Antwerp.

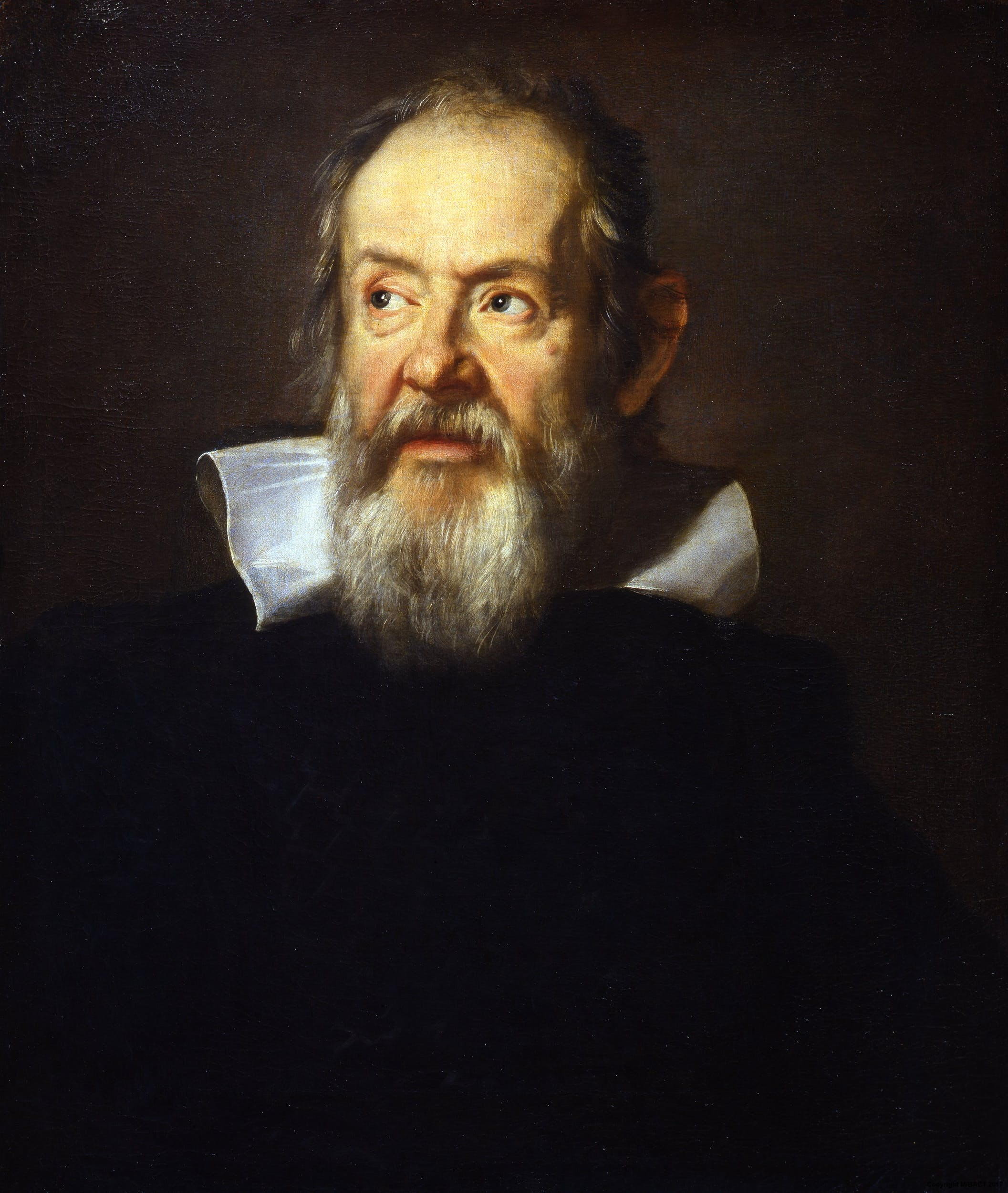
Portrait of Galileo Galilei

When Cosimo II de' Medici, Grand Duke of Tuscany invited in 1620 a team of Flemish and French tapestry weavers from Paris to Tuscany, Suttermans joined them. The party likely reached Florence in October 1620. On 20 April 1621 he is first documented in Florence when the Compagnia dei SS Barbara e Quirino paid him for a painting of Saint Barbara. He is first recorded in the service of the Medici in October 1621. Suttermans gained this court appointment on the strength of a portrait of one of the tapestry weavers, a painting identified as a portrait of Pietro Févère or Ebert d'Egidio van Asselt.

As the Medici had many family connections with other courts in northern Italy and Austria, Sustermans often travelled to other cities in Italy as well as to Vienna. In 1620 to early 1621 he was active in Mantua, where his master Pourbus had been a court painter at the beginning of the century. He painted in Mantua portraits of Eleonora Gonzaga, who was Emperor Ferdinand II's future wife, of Caterina de' Medici, Duke Ferdinando Gonzaga's wife, and a miniature portrait of Caterina de' Medici. On 5 January 1622, he delivered his first surviving documented work for the Medici, a portrait of Maria Maddalena of Austria, the widow of Grand Duke Cosimo II (now in the Royal Museum of Fine Arts of Belgium Brussels). In 1623 and 1624 he worked in Vienna on commissions from the Holy Roman Emperor Ferdinand II. He wrote a letter to the Emperor pleading for him and his brothers Jan, Nicolaes, Frans, Vincent and Cornelis to be raised to the nobility. He explained in the letter that he and his brothers had been called from Florence to put their art in the service of the Emperor. The Emperor elevated the brothers Sustermans, including a brother called Matthias not mentioned in Justus' letter, to the nobility in 1624. His brother Jan may have assisted with some of the portraits of the imperial family that Justus painted in Vienna. He returned to Florence by 17 February 1625, when he enrolled in the Accademia del Disegno. He may have made another trip to Vienna in 1626.

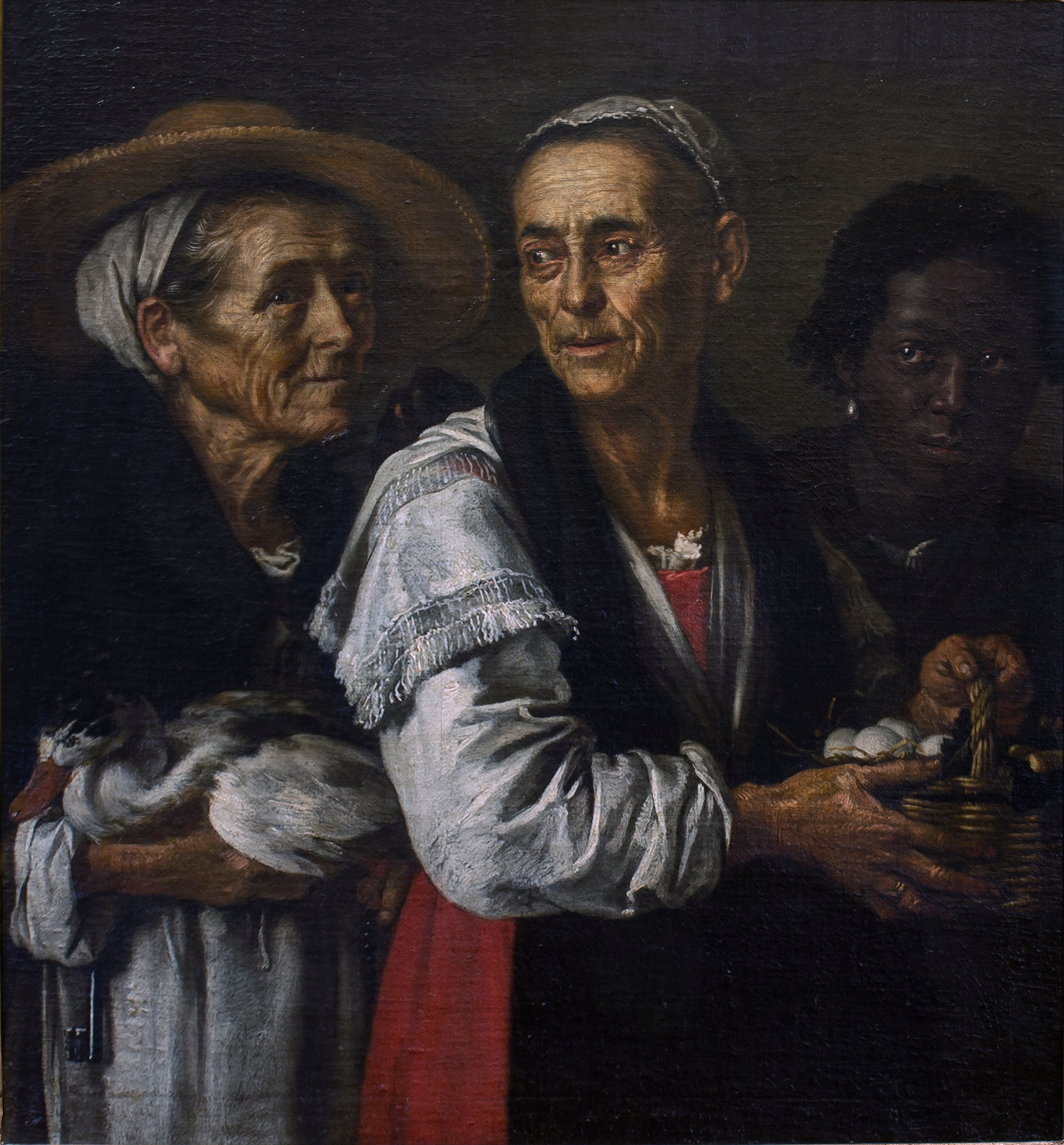
Portrait of Domenica delle Cascine, la Cecca di Pratolino and Pietro Moro

He traveled to Rome with his brother Frans, where in 1627 he painted portraits of Pope Urban VIII and most of the cardinals at the Vatican. Other travels included a 1639 stay at the Farnese court in Parma where he would have seen the work of Correggio. He was in 1639–40 in Piacenza. In 1640 he worked in Milan for Don Diego Felipez de Guzmán, 1st Marquess of Leganés. He returned to Florence. He traveled to Rome in 1645 in the following of Cardinal Giancarlo de' Medici, the second son of Grand Duke Cosimo II. He painted portraits of Pope Innocent X and members of the Doria Pamphilj family. He was in Modena from June 1649 where he worked at the court of Francesco I d'Este. From there he was summoned to Genoa to work in the service of Giancarlo de' Medici. He is recorded making in November 1649 in Genoa a portrait of Maria Anna of Spain for Giancarlo. Here he would have seen van Dyck's portraits of Genoese patricians. He returned to Modena in November where he may have seen Velázquez' Portrait of Duke Francesco (Galleria Estense, 1638). In Modena he also met Guercino. From there he returned to Florence in 1650 where he resided until 1653. That year he worked in Ferrara, Modena and Mantua. In the fall of 1654 he was back in Modena and in 1654 in Genoa. In the period from 1654 to 1681 he spent most of his time in Florence. He worked in 1656 in Mantua and Modena and at the end of that year and the next year in Innsbruck. While in Austria he may have visited his brothers Matthias, a court musician, and Cornelis, a painter. He worked again in Modena from June to October 1659. He may have worked for some time in Spain.

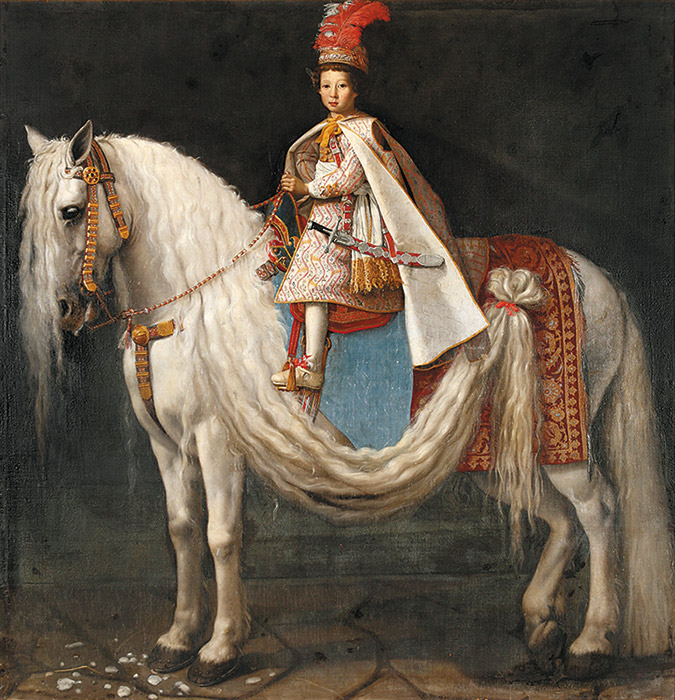
Equestrian portrait of Ferdinando de' Medici

He became friends with Rubens and van Dyck and maintained regular correspondence with them. He commissioned from Rubens in 1638 the painting Horrors of War (Florence, Pitti Palace) for his own collection. He operated a large workshop which produced many copies and variations of his paintings. Some of the collaborators in his workshop established a name for themselves including the brothers Valore and Domenico Casini, Valerio Marucelli, Francesco Bianchi Buonavita and Giovanni Lionardo Henner. These assistants likely painted the secondary details in his portraits. The important role played by the workshop in his output had a negative impact on his posthumous reputation.

Sustermans married three times. He married first Dejanira di Santi Fabbretti, originally from Pisa. She died in August 1628 at the birth of their only son Carlo who later became a priest. In 1635 he married Maddalena di Cosimo Mazzocchi, from which union were born a son Francesco Maria and a daughter Vittoria. His son died in 1663. He married Maddalena Artimini in 1664 with whom he had another son and daughter. His nephew Giovanni Vangheldri (Jan van Gelder) (active 1651–1675), a son of his sister Clara Sustermans and merchant Johannes van Gelder, was a prominent portrait artist for the Dukes of Modena and Counts of Novellara. He likely joined his uncle Justus in Modena in 1649.

He died in Florence on 23 April 1681 and was buried in San Felice church.

== Work ==
Sustermans is mainly known for his portrait paintings. He also painted a number of history and genre paintings, still lifes and animals.

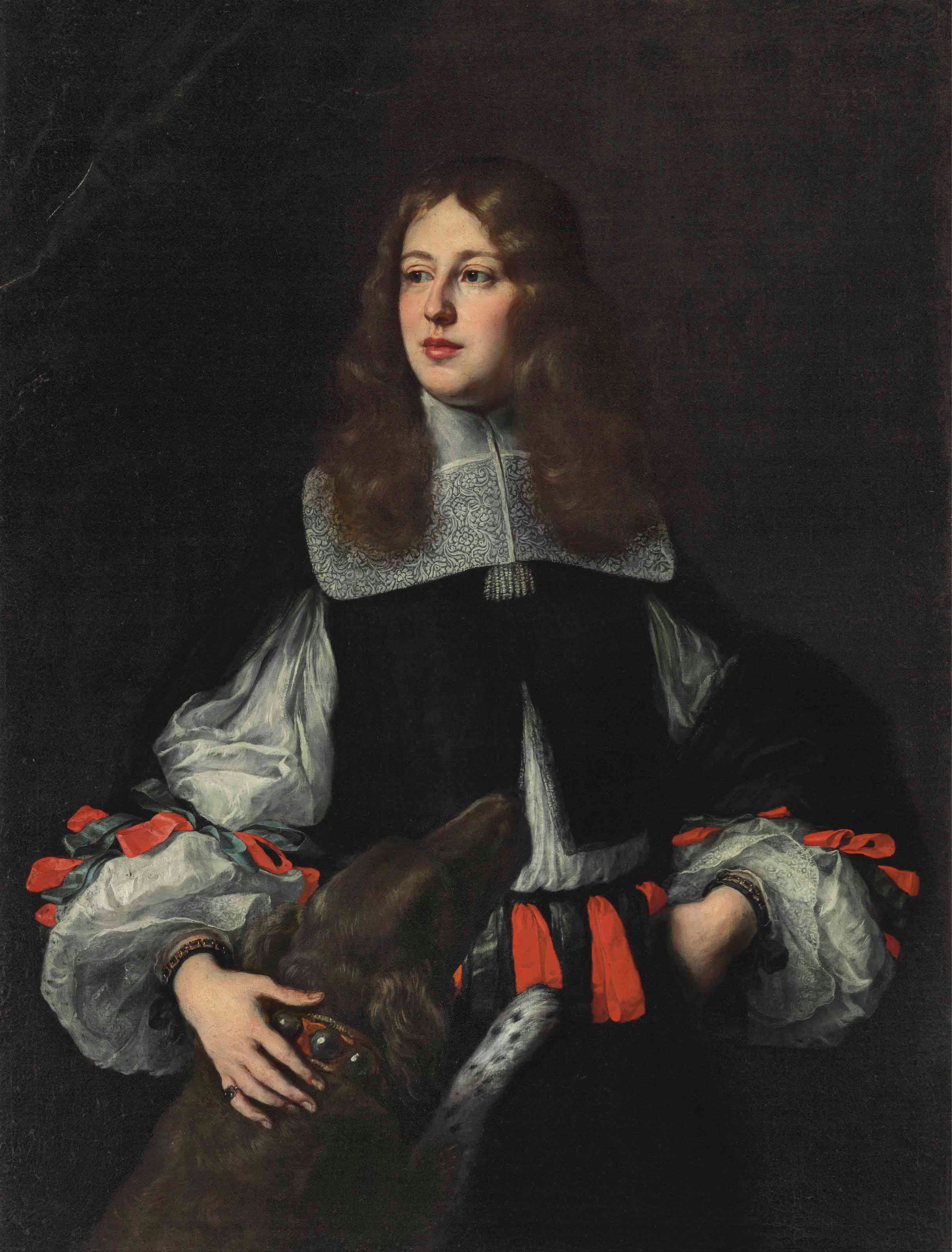
Portrait of Orazio Piccolomini, three-quarter-length, with a dog

He rarely dated his works, which makes it difficult to establish a chronology. His works have been dated mainly by relying on the apparent age of identified sitters. His early portraits show the influence of his master Frans Pourbus the Younger whose courtly portrait style was known for accentuating attention to precious details as well as its hard modelling. Sustermans did not share the Flemish preference for concentrating on the details of the sitters' clothes and rather favored a monumental simplicity in form. In Italy his style started to reflect the contact with Florentine painters such as Cristofano Allori and Domenico Passignano. An example is the Portrait of Fra' Francesco dell'Antella (private collection, before early 1623). His Maria Maddalena of Austria (Wife of Duke Cosimo II de' Medici) with her Son, the Future Ferdinand II (Flint Institute of Arts, 1623) shows his familiarity with the work of Scipione Pulzone, in particular his Portrait of Christine of Lorraine (Uffizi).

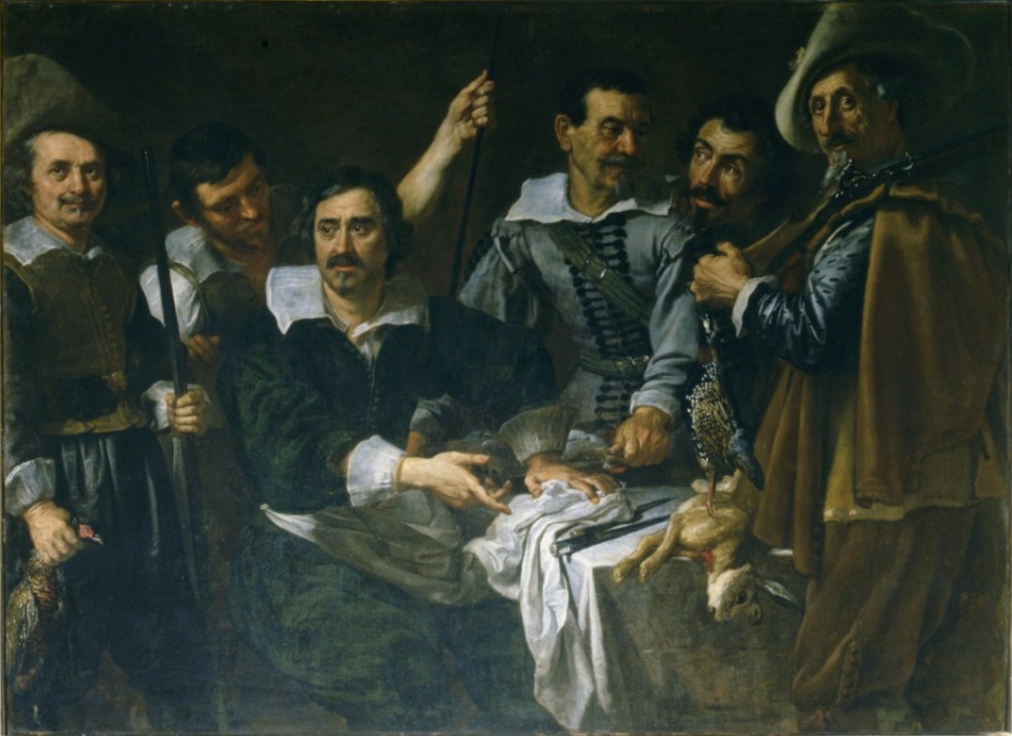
The cloakroom of the Villa di Pratolino with hunters and cooks of the Medici family

During his years in Vienna in 1623 and 1624 he painted in a more painterly style which possibly was under the influence of the works of Hans von Aachen and Josef Heintz. Later, his work became more Baroque, under the influence of Flemish painters such as Rubens, Anthony van Dyck and Cornelis de Vos. His Portrait of Prince Waldemar Christian of Denmark (Galleria Palatina) shows the influence of Rubens. His mature style of the 1630s is characterised by its loose and expressive brushwork and lighter palette. The works of the Venetians such as Titian may have led to his lighter palette in the 1630s. Suttermans was for seven years in possession of Titian's Portrait of Pietro Aretino (Florence, Pitti), which was in the collection of the Medici. This work may have inspired his famous Portrait of Galileo Galilei (Uffizi Museum). It was commissioned by Elia Diodati, a jurist who lived between Paris and Geneva and was a good friend of Galileo. After Galileo's death, he donated the portrait to the Grand Duke Ferdinand II. The portrait is a half bust showing Galileo's face on which the light source falls and looking upwards outside the frame. At the time of the painting, Galileo was around 70 years old. The work is executed in a thickly painted texture similar to 16th-century Venetian painting. The presence of Pietro da Cortona in Florence from 1637 may have been another element in his stylistic evolution. From the mid-1640s he returned to his earlier handling of surfaces, with sharp contrasts between light and shadow. An example is the full-length Portraits of Vittoria della Rovere with the young Cosimo III de Medici (Museo Nazionale di Palazzo Mansi, 1646).

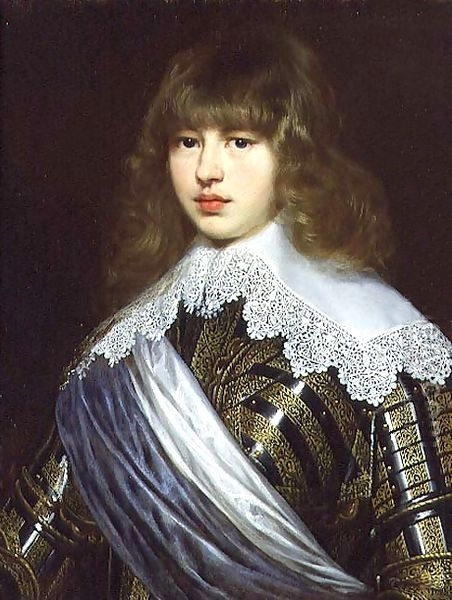
Portrait of Prince Valdemar, aged between 16 and 18

Sustermans was a gifted animal painter. In the mid-50s there was a dip in the quality of his output. The reason behind this may have been an increased dependence on his workshop, either because Sustermans was regularly travelling or because of the Grand Duke's imposition of standard prices for anything other than full-length portraits. In the 1660s and 1670s his brushwork became more restrained and he often placed his figures against a dark background with rapid expert touches of highlight.

=== Selected works ===
- Portrait of a Lady, oil on canvas (Norton Simon Museum, Pasadena, California)
- Portrait of a Lady Wearing Pearls , oil on canvas (Odessa Museum of Western and Eastern Art, Ukraine)
- The Senators of Florence swearing Allegiance to Ferdinando II de’Medici, oil on canvas, (Ashmolean, Oxford)
- Portrait of Galileo Galilei, (shown at right) oil on canvas (National Maritime Museum, Greenwich)
- Portrait of Galileo, oil on canvas (Uffizi Gallery, Florence)
- Portrait of a Woman, oil on canvas (National Museum of Serbia), Belgrade
- Portrait of the Grand Duke Ferdinando II of Tuscany and his Wife Vittoria della Rovere, oil on canvas (National Gallery, London)
- Vincenzo II Gonzaga, Ruler of Mantua from 1587–1612, Wearing the Order of the Redemeer, oil on canvas
- Portrait of Cardinale Carlo de' Medici, oil on canvas (Museo Poldi Pezzoli, Milan)
- Maria Maddalena of Austria, Wife of the Grand Duke Cosimo II de' Medici and Sister of the Emperor Ferdinand, with her son, the Future Ferdinand II, oil on canvas (Summerfield Gallery, Flint Institute of Art, Flint, Michigan)
- The family of Darius in front of Alexander, (Biblioteca Museu Víctor Balaguer, Vilanova i la Geltrú)
