= Bathers at San Niccolò =

1600 painting by Domenico Passignano

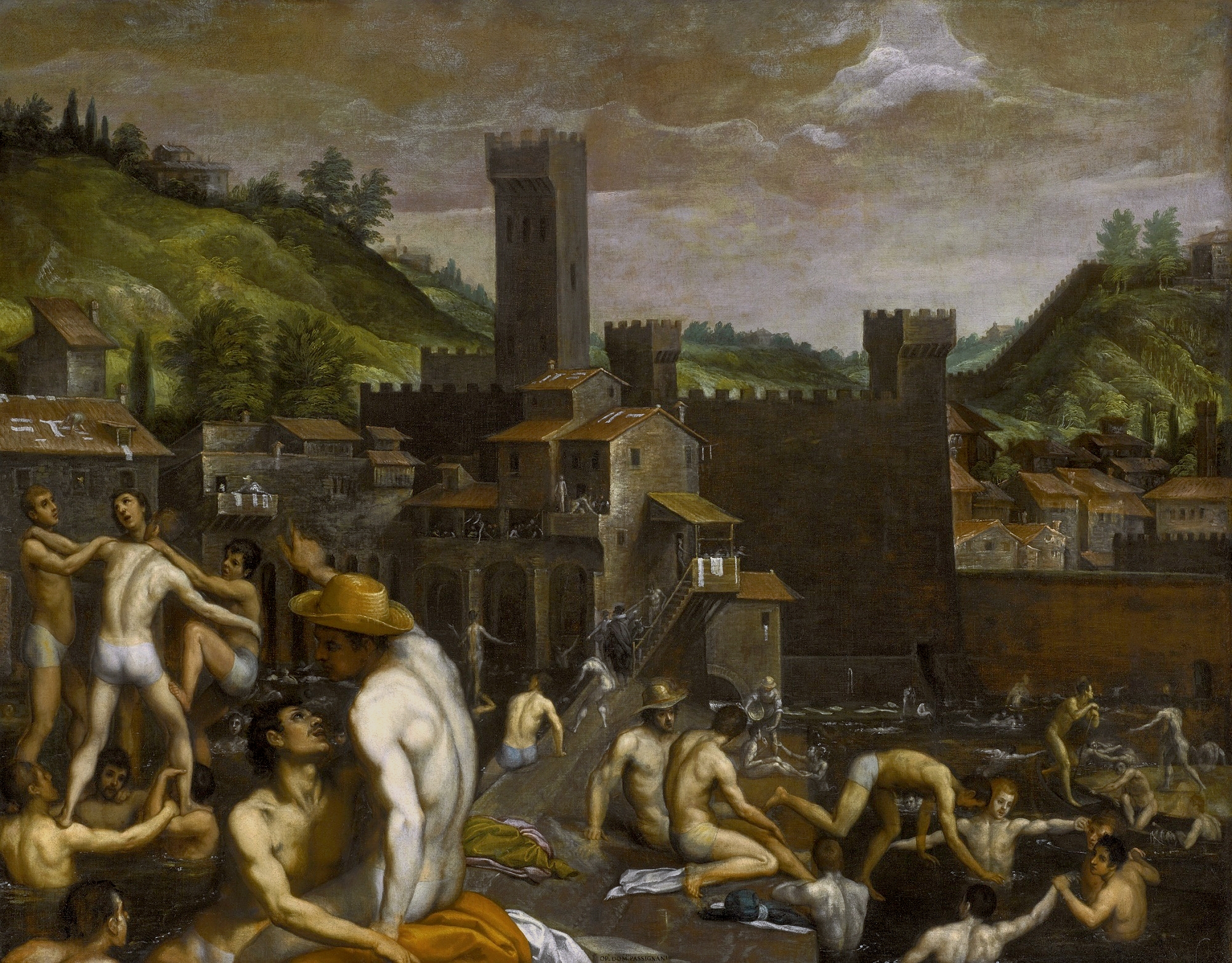
Domenico Cresti, Bathers at San Niccolò, 1600, private collection

Bathers at San Niccolò is a large oil painting by Domenico Cresti, known as Domenico Passignano, signed and dated 1600. The Mannerist painting depicts men bathing in the River Arno near the crenelated Tower of San Niccolò in Florence.

The subject is a departure from Passignano's usual oeuvre of religious, mythological, and historical paintings. The depictions draw on earlier works depicting naked people, such as religious paintings of the torments of Hell. The painting may also draw on a pair of engravings by Albrecht Dürer of bathing men and women, and paintings of public baths made by Michelangelo and Leonardo da Vinci, particularly Michelangelo's uncompleted (and now lost) fresco of the Battle of Cascina made for the Room of the Great Council now the Salone dei Cinquecento) at the Palazzo Vecchio in Florence between 1504 and 1508, known from engravings of the (also lost) cartoon. The battle was fought on a hot summer's day, so the Florentine soldiers removed their armour to bathe in the river: the Pisans attempted to launch a surprise attack, but the refreshed Florentines were warned of the approaching Pisans and re-armed themselves in time to defeat their tired enemies.

Passignano made a number of preliminary drawings in red chalk, perhaps made from life, some of which are held by the Uffizi and the Louvre. The completed oil painting depicts a number of muscular men in or beside the river: stripping off, entering and leaving the water, bathing, conversing, and embracing. It measures 56 in × 71 in (140 cm × 180 cm) and is signed and dated lower center: "OP^{s}. DOM^{CI}. PASSIGNANI / FLO MDC".

The provenance of the painting before the mid-20th century is uncertain. It may have influenced a c.1630 engraving of a similar bathing scene by Jacques Callot. It may be a work mentioned in a catalogue by Filippo Baldinucci published posthumously in 1728, as being owned by Filippo di Lorenzo Niccolini, third Marchese di Ponsacco e Camugliano (1655–1738), in Florence in the late 17th century. It appeared with the art dealers Reid and Lefevre in London by 1959, and passed through several private collections, before being sold at Sotheby's in New York City in 2017 for US$732,500. The auction catalogue described it as "perhaps the most important artistic example of homoerotic art of the late Mannerist period", anticipating by 300 years paintings such as Thomas Eakins's The Swimming Hole.

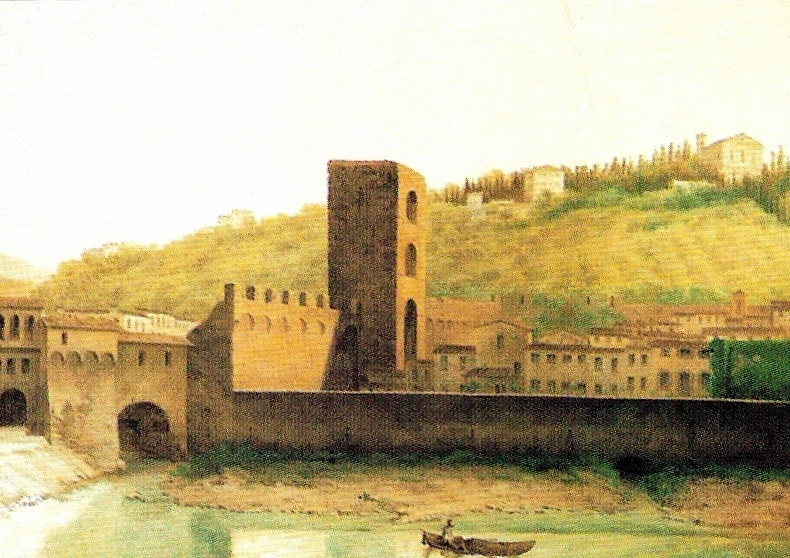
Tower of San Niccolò in the 19th century

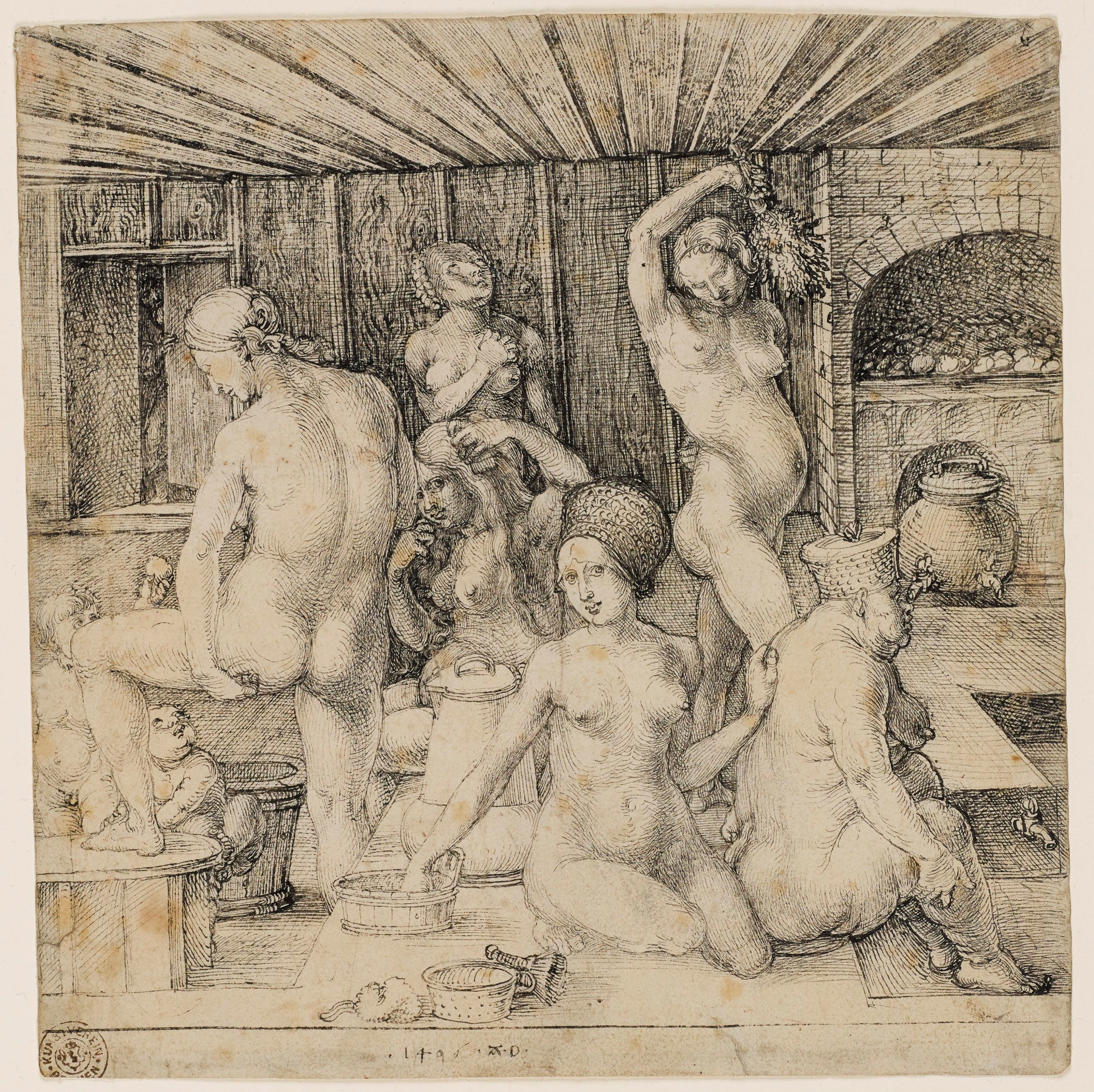
Albrecht Dürer, The Women's Bath (Das Frauenbad), c.1496

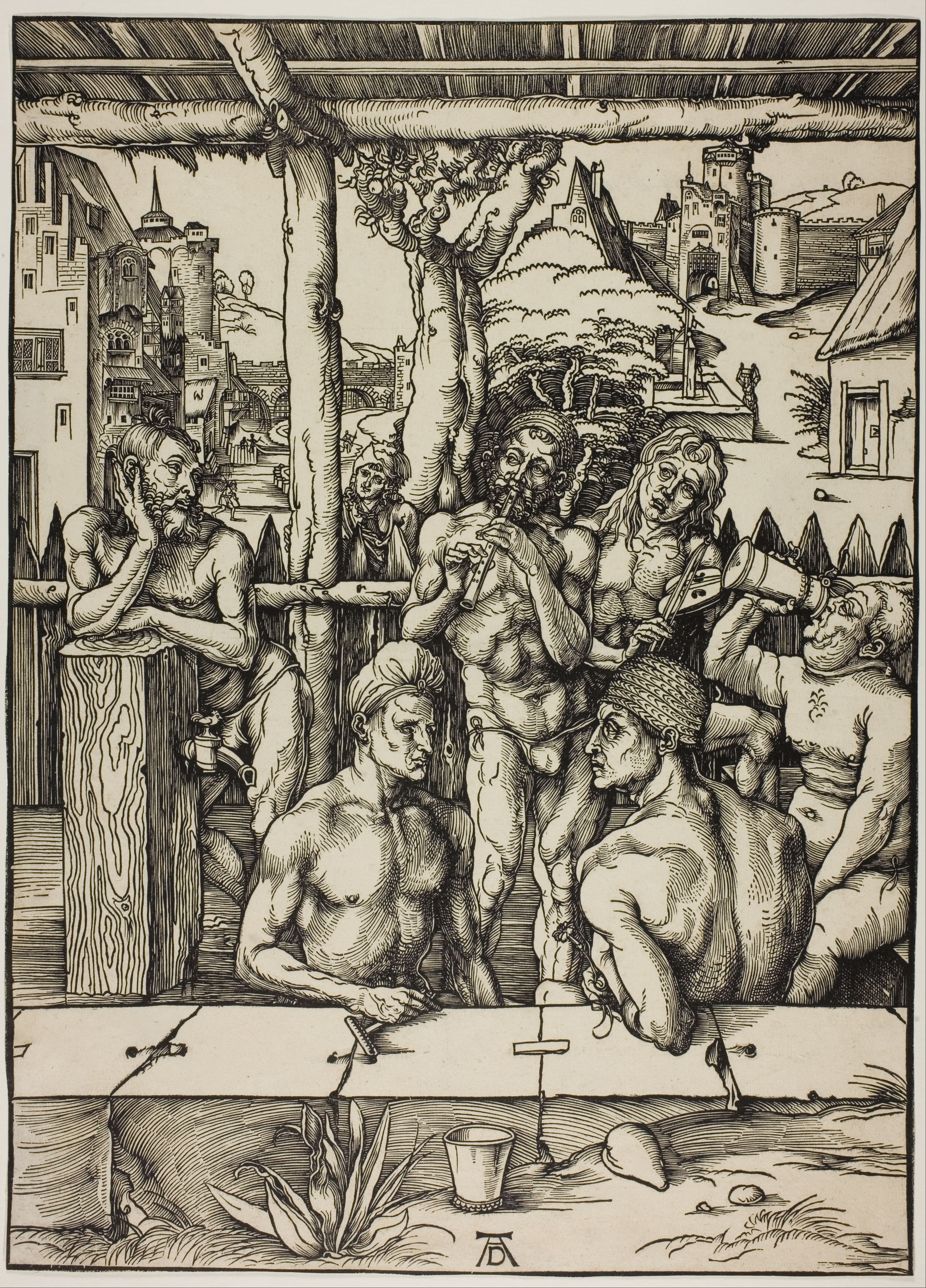
Albrecht Dürer, The Men's Bath (Das Männerbad), c.1496

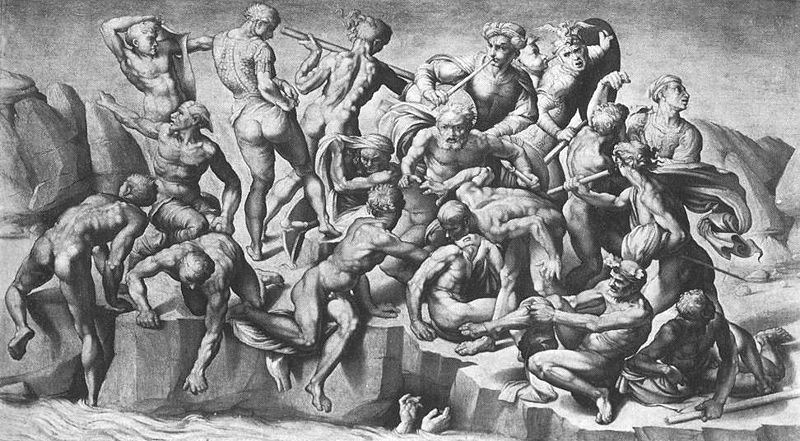
Copy of Michelangelo's Battle of Cascina by his pupil Aristotele da Sangallo, c.1542

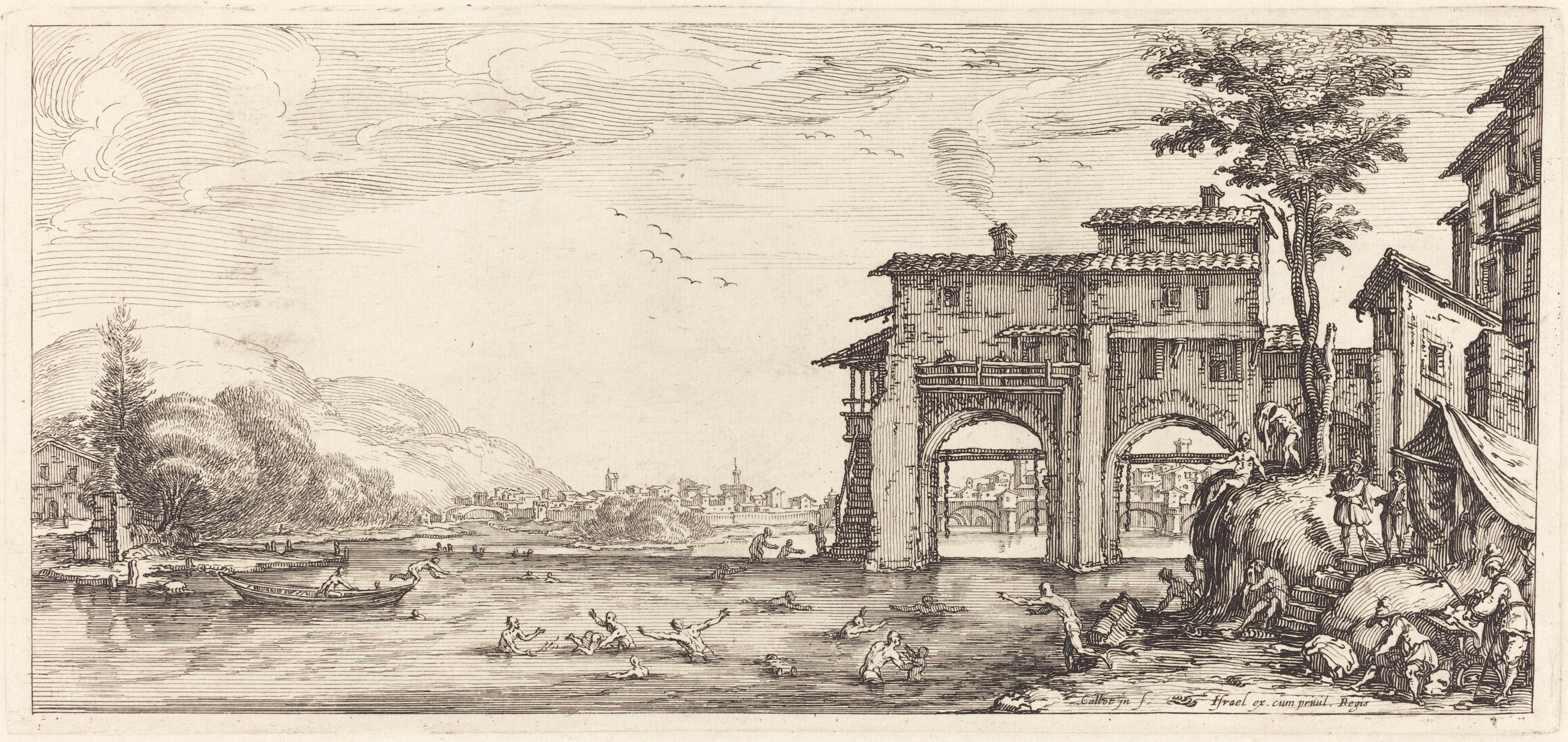
Jacques Callot, The Bathers, c.1630

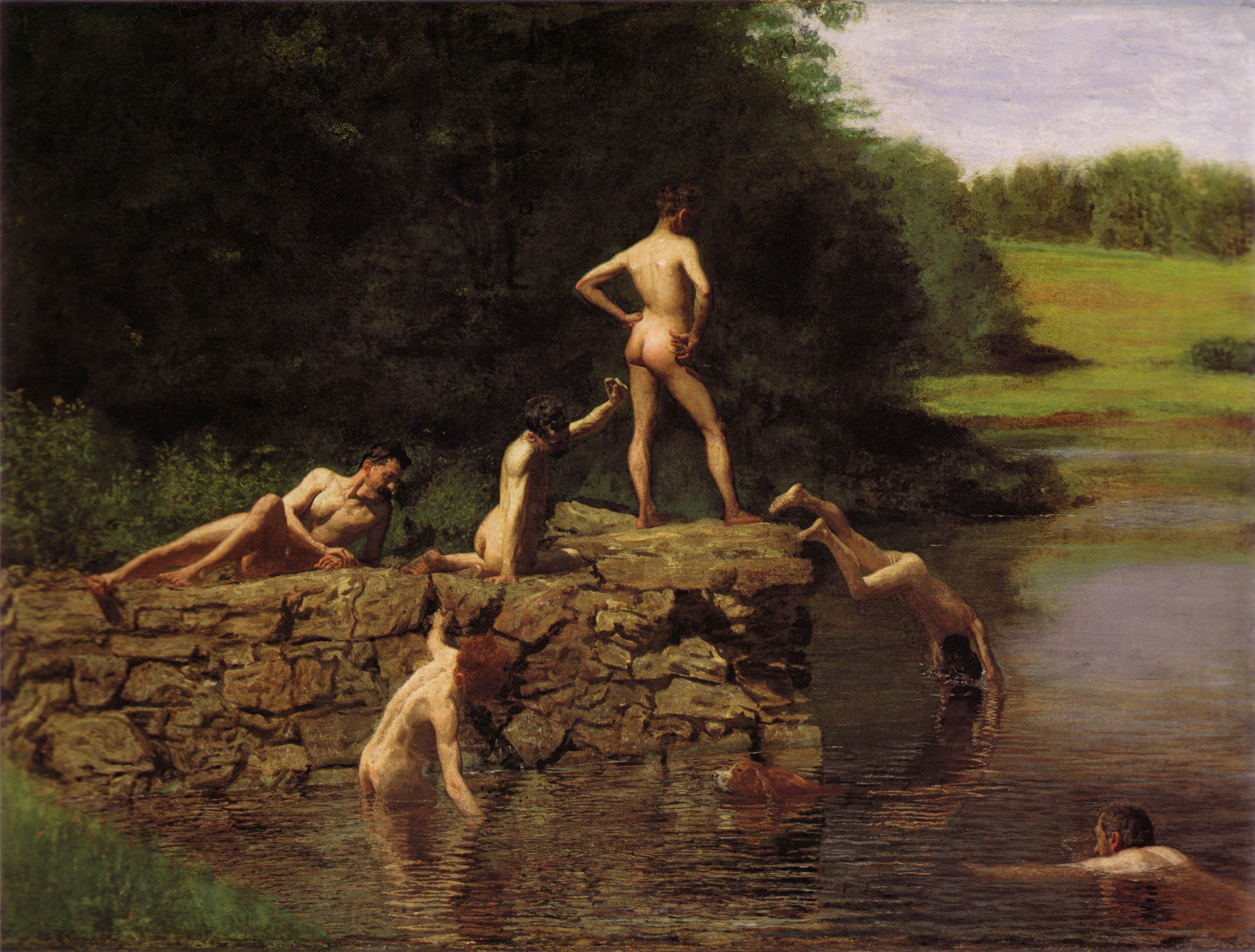
Thomas Eakins, The Swimming Hole, 1884–85
