= Willem de Vos =

Willem de Vos may refer to:

- Willem de Vos (academic)
- Willem de Vos (painter)
