= Schelte a Bolswert =

Dutch engraver (1586–1659)

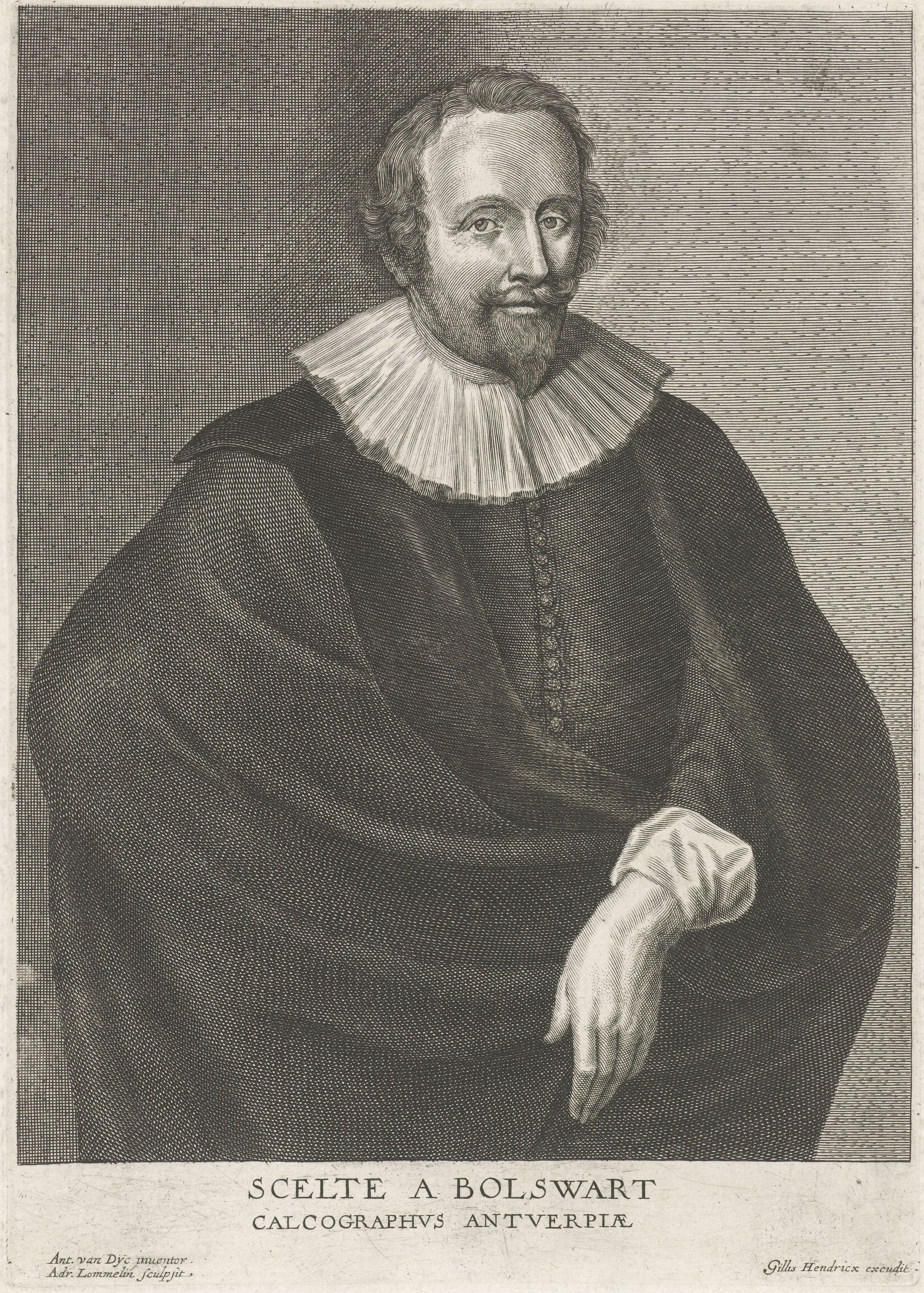
Portrait of Schelte Adamsz. Bolswert, by Adriaen Lommelin after Anthony van Dyck, engraved between 1632 and 1641.

Schelte a Bolswert or Schelte Adamsz. Bolswert (c. 1586 – 1659) was a Frisian engraver who worked most of his career in Antwerp where he was one of the lead engravers in Rubens' workshop. He is known for his reproductive works after Rubens and Anthony van Dyck.

== Life ==
He was born in the town of Bolswert in Friesland around 1586 as the son of Adam Uytema. Both he and his older brother, Boetius à Bolswert left in 1609 their hometown for Amsterdam where the older brother worked as an engraver for the print publisher Michiel Colyn. The younger brother studied printmaking with his brother and produced his first known work in 1612. By 1617 the brothers were active in Antwerp as employees of the Plantin Press.

Boetius was admitted as a freemaster in the Antwerp Guild of Saint Luke in 1621. He and Adam received a permit (a so-called 'privilege') to engrave, print and sell engravings in Antwerp. Adam became freemaster in the Antwerp Guild of Saint Luke in the guild year 1625-1626. He never acquired Antwerp poorterschap (citizenship). Schelte lived in with the Lauwers family of printers on the Lombardenvest.

For the last five years of his life Boetius worked exclusively on engravings after Rubens. Following his death in 1633, Schelte was employed by Rubens in his place. He worked closely with the painter, who sometimes retouched his proofs. He continued to engrave his works after Rubens' death in 1640.

He died in Antwerp and was buried on 22 December 1659 in the choir of Antwerp Cathedral.

== Work ==
Bolswert's plates were worked entirely with the graver, and he does not seem to have made any use of the drypoint. Basan said of his work:

The freedom which this excellent artist handled the graver, the picturesque roughness of etching, which he could imitate without any other assisting instrument, and the ability he possessed of distinguishing the different masses of colours, have always been admired by the conoisseurs".

Joseph Strutt, after quoting this passage, adds that Bolswert "drew excellently, and without any manner of his own; for his prints are the exact transcripts of the pictures he engraved from". His plates are generally signed with his name.

== Principal prints ==
=== Various subjects, mostly after his own designs ===
- The Infant Jesus and St. John playing with a Lamb.
- The Virgin Mary, and Infant Jesus sleeping.
- The Virgin giving suck to the Infant.
- The Virgin Mary, with her hands folded on her Breast.
- The Virgin Mary with the Infant in the clouds, with Angels and Cherubim.
- The Infant Jesus caressing the Virgin Mary, and St. Joseph holding a Pear.
- Twelve half-length figures of Saints.

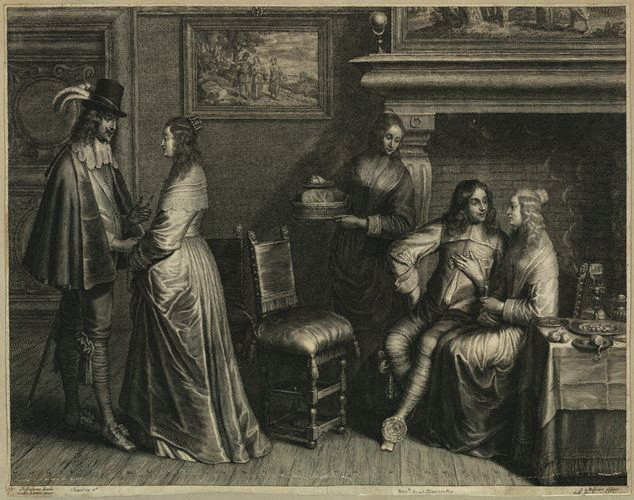
Elegant company in an interior, after painting by Christoffel Jacobsz van der Laemen in the National Portrait Gallery.

- Twelve other half-length figures of Saints, beginning with St. Peter.
- A Hermit kneeling before a Crucifix.
- Mater Dolorosa.
- Jesus Christ triumphing over Death.
- St. Barbe, Martyr.
- St. Stanislaus Koska, kneeling before an Altar.
- St. Francis Borgia.
- St. Alfonso Rodriguez.
- Robert Bellarmin, of the Society of Jesus.
- Leonard Lessius; another Jesuit.
- An emblematical subject of Prince Ferdinand; inscribed In te spes reclinata recumbit.
- Two plates of a Thesis; dedicated to Sigismund, King of Poland.
- Six plates, with the Frontispiece, for the Académie de I'Espée; by Thibault. 1628.
- The Dispute between the Gras and the Meagre; B. A. Bolswert inv.

=== Various subjects, after different Flemish masters ===
- The Death of a Saint, and that of a Sinner; after Abraham van Diepenbeeck.
- The Dead Christ on the Knees of the Virgin Mary.
- The Crucifixion of the Three Jesuits at Japan; after the same.
- The Crucifixion; Jac. Jordans inv. et pinx.; the best impressions are before the cum Privilegio Regis.
- Mercury and Argus; after the same; the good impressions are before the address of Blooteling.

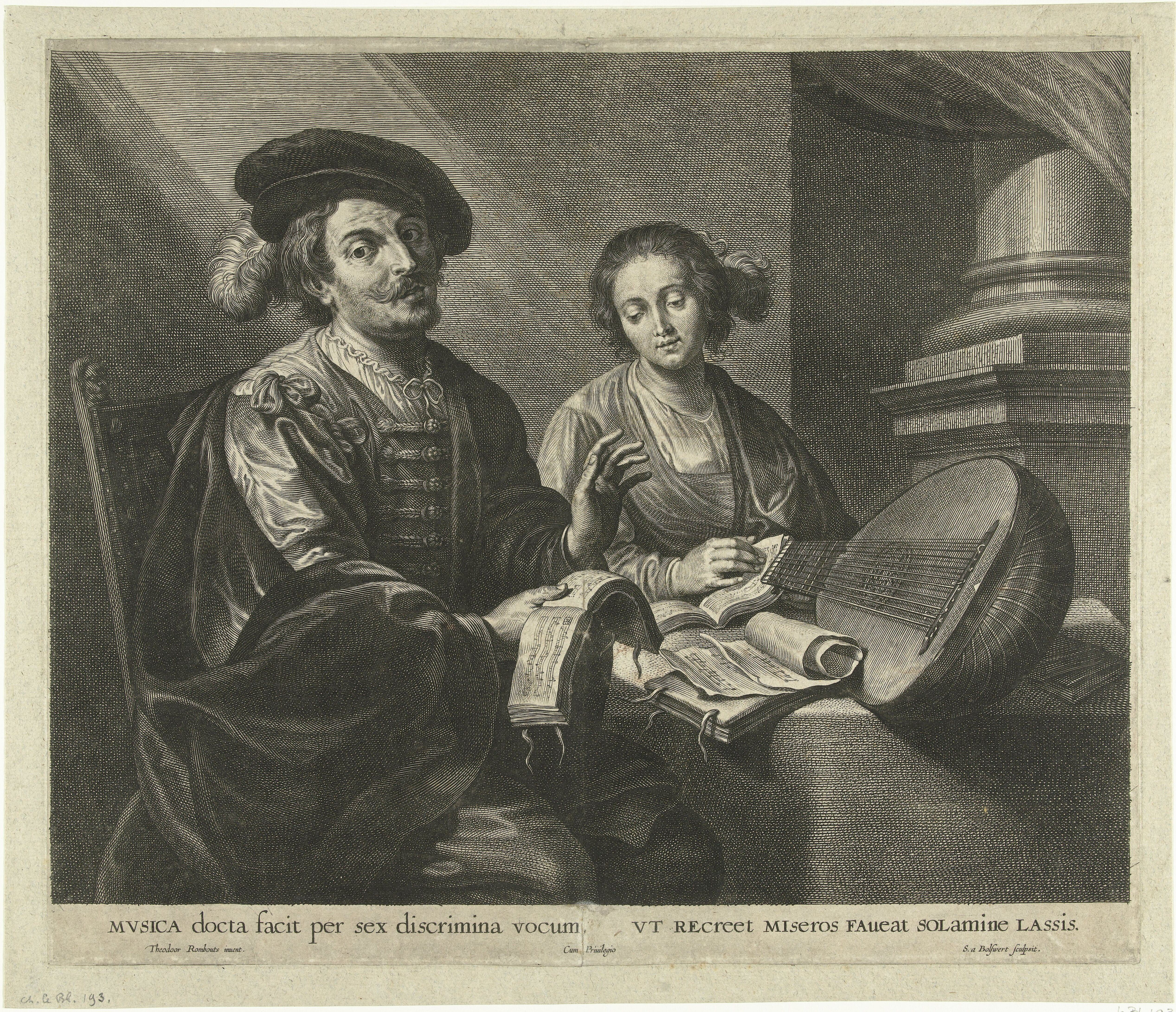
The duet. The painter Theodoor Rombouts and his wife Anna van Thielen after Theodoor Rombouts

- The infant Jupiter.
- Pan playing on a Flute; after the same.
- A Concert; entitled Soo Doude songen, soo pepen de Jongen; after the same.
- Pan holding a Basket of Fruit, and Ceres crowned with Corn, and a Man sounding a Horn; after the same.
- The Salutation; after Gerard Seghers.
- The Return of the Holy Family out of Egypt; after the same.
- The Virgin appearing to St. Ignatius, who is kneeling; after the same.
- St. Francis Xavier, tempted by the Devil; after the same.
- Peter denying Christ; after the same.
- Abraham sacrificing Isaac; after Theodoor Rombouts.
- A Concert; after the same.
- The Virgin with the Infant Jesus holding a Globe; after Erasmus Quellinus the Younger.
- The Communion of St. Rosa; after the same.
- The Triumph of the Archduke Leopold Wilhelm, Governor of the Habsburg Netherlands, 1653; four sheets; after the same.

=== Portraits, etc., after Van Dyck ===
- Andries van Eertvelt, painter of Antwerp.
- Marten Pepijn, painter.
- Adriaen Brouwer, painter.
- Jan Baptist Barbé, engraver. (pictured)
- Justus Lipsius, historiographer royal.
- Albert de Ligne, Prince of Barbançon and Arenberg.
- Mary Ruthven, wife of Van Dyck.

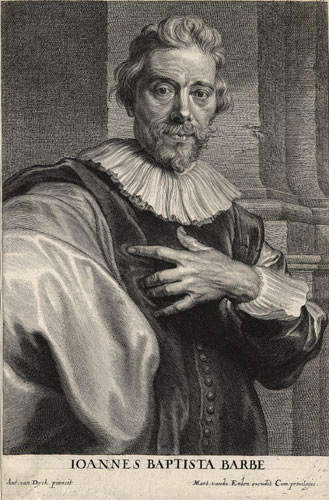
Portrait of Jan Baptist Barbé, after Anthony van Dyck, ca. 1636-1641.

- Margaret of Lorraine, Duchess of Orleans.
- Willem de Vos, painter. (pictured)
- Sebastiaen Vrancx, painter.
- Maria mater Dei.
- The Holy Family, with an Angel holding a Crown.
- The Virgin and the Infant Christ on her Knoe, with a Female Saint holding a Palm.
- The Holy Family, with the Infant sleeping in the Arms of the Virgin.
- The Holy Family in a landscape, with several Angels.
- Christ crowned with Thorns; very fine.
- The Elevation of the Cross.
- The Crucifixion, a grand composition, with two Men on horseback, and a figure presenting the Sponge to Christ. On the other side, the Virgin Mary and St. John standing, and Mary Magdalene kneeling and embracing the Cross. This is considered one of the most beautiful engravings by Bolswert. In the first impressions, which are very scarce, the hand of St. John is not seen on the shoulder of the Virgin: in the second impressions, the hand of St. John rests on the Virgin's shoulder, and the name of Van Dyck is changed from the left to the right hand comer of the plate. In the last impressions the hand was erased, probably to give them the appearance of first impressions, but the trick is easily discovered by the superiority of the first in point of clearness and colour.

=== Subjects after Rubens ===
- The Brazen Serpent; the best impressions are those which have the word Antwerpiae at the right hand corner, without the name of G. Hendrix.
- The Marriage of the Virgin; the best impressions have the name of Hendrix, without the word Antwerpiae.
- The Annunciation; the best impressions are those with the address of Martinus van den Enden the Elder.
- The Nativity; the best impressions have the same address.
- The Adoration of the Magi; the same.
- The Return of the Holy Family from Egypt: the same.
- The Feast of Herod, with Herodias presenting the Head of St. John to her Mother.
- The Executioner giving the Head of St. John to Herodias.
- The miraculous Draught of Fishes; in three plates.
- Christ crucified between the Thieves; G. Hendrix exc.
- The Crucifixion, a Soldier on horseback piercing the side of Our Saviour; dated 1631; extremely fine.
- The Crucifixion, with the city of Jerusalem in the distance; M. van den Enden exc.
- The Dead Christ in the Lap of the Virgin Mary, with. St. Francis; the same subject is engraved by Pontius.
- The Resurrection; M. van den Enden excudit.
- The Ascension; the same.
- The Four Evangelists.
- The Fathers of the Church; Nic. Lauwers exc.
- The Destruction of Idolatry; in two sheets; the same.
- The Triumph of the Church; in two sheets; the same.
- The Immaculate Conception; Ant. Bon. Enfant exc.
- The Assumption; arched; M. van den Enden exc.
- The Assumption, with one of the Disciples lifting the Stone of the Sepulchre; M. van den Enden; the impressions with the address of G. Hendrix are posterior, and those with the name of C. van Merlen are retouched.
- The Infant Jesus embracing the Virgin Mary; M. van den Enden exc.
- The Virgin Mary holding a Globe, and the Infant Jesus holding a Sceptre.
- The Holy Family, vrith the Infant Jesus and St. John caressing a Lamb.
- The Holy Family, with a Parrot on a Pillar; A. Bonenfant exc.
- St. Ignatius and St. Francis Xavier; the first impressions are before the name of Rubens.
- The Education of the Virgin by St. Anne; the best impressions are without the name of Hendrix.
- St. Cecilia; very fine.
- St. Theresa at the Feet of Christ, interceding for the Souls in Purgatory; M. van den Enden exc.
- The Continence of Scipio; the best impressions are before the address of G. Hendrix.
- Silenus, drunk, supported by a Satyr, with another figure; the best impressions are those with the name of Bolswert only, without the address.
- A Peasant Dance, Gillis Hendricx excudit.

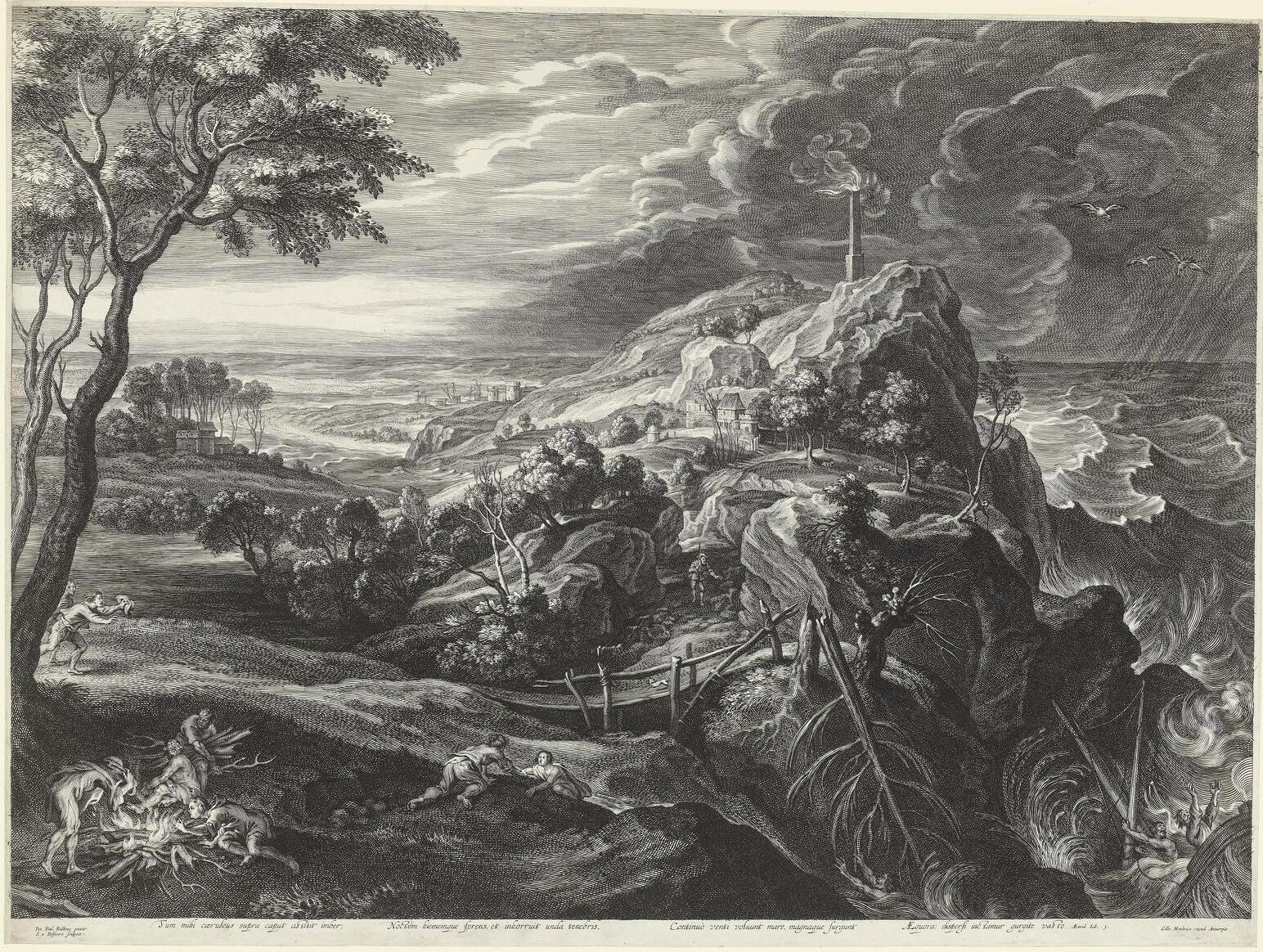
Shipwreck of St Paul after Rubens.

=== Landscapes and hunting scenes ===
- A set of six 'large landscapes' after Rubens
  - Philemon and Baucis (Ovid) - grand landscape deluged by a torrent.
  - Shipwreck of Aeneas after (Virgil) - grand landscape, sea-coast, beacon and a shipwreck.
  - Shipwreck of St Paul at Malta. - landscape with rainbow.
  - The Calydonian Boar Hunt, with Atalanta and Meleager in a grand woody landscape.
  - A view near Mechelen, with Haymakers and a Waggon, and figures driving Cattle.
  - Parable of the Prodigal Son - including a stable with horses and cows.
- A set of twenty 'smaller landscapes'.
- A set of twelve Huntings of different animals, of which one is a Lion Hunt, with figures on horseback.
