= Jan Baptist Barbé =

Flemish engraver and publisher (1578–1649)

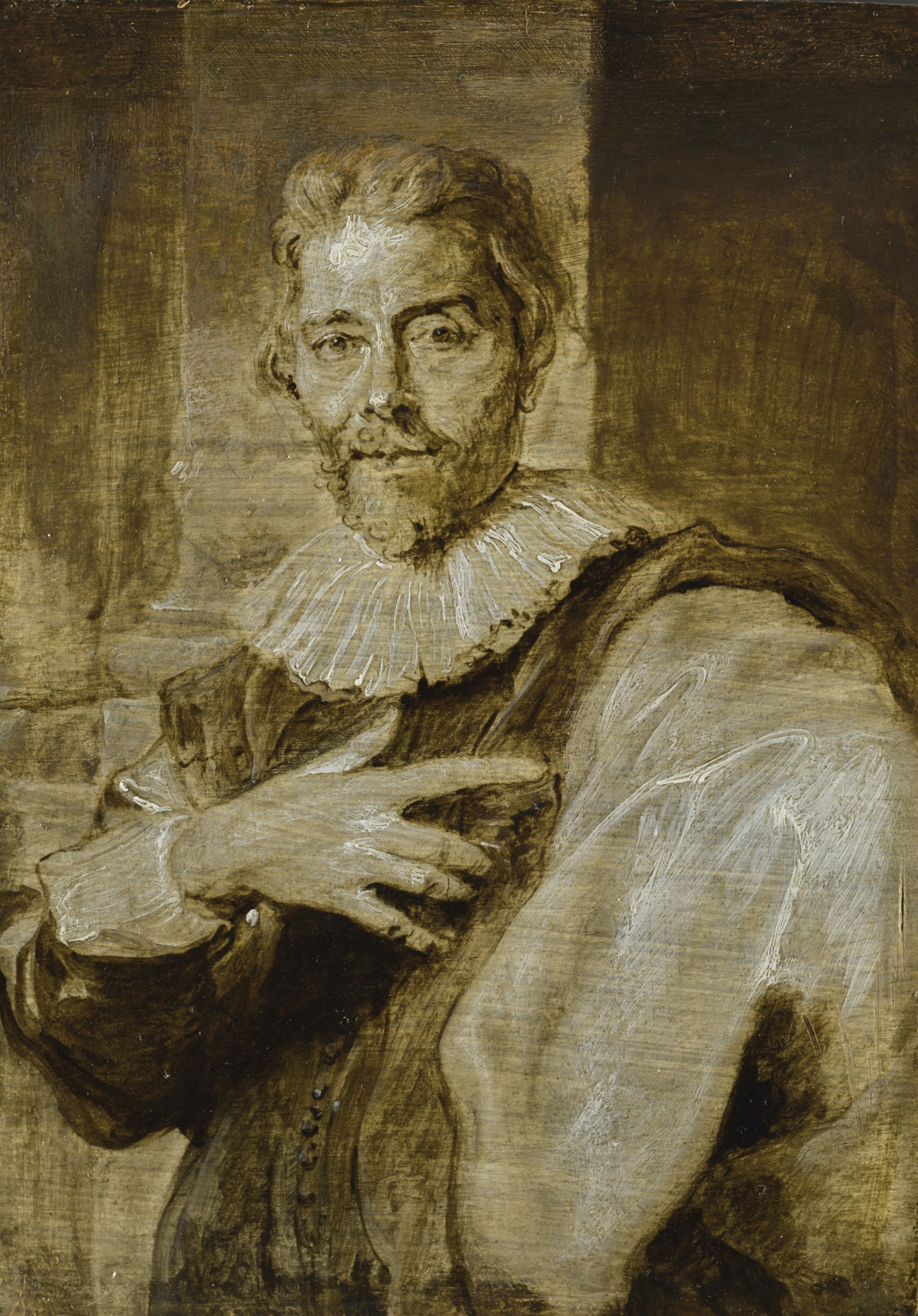
Jan Baptist Barbé (Anthony van Dyck)

Jan Baptist Barbé or Jan-Baptist Barbé (referred to as Jean-Baptiste Barbé in French language sources) (1578–1649) was a Flemish engraver, publisher and art dealer active in Antwerp. He is known for his engravings after his own designs as well as for his reproductive engravings.

== Life ==
Barbé was born in Antwerp as the son of the Antoon Barbé and Joanna Ceels. His father was a composer and choir conductor and organist of the St. James' Church in Antwerp. Jan Baptist Barbé was baptized in the Antwerp Cathedral on 28 July 1578. In 1595 he entered the studio of Philippe Galle.

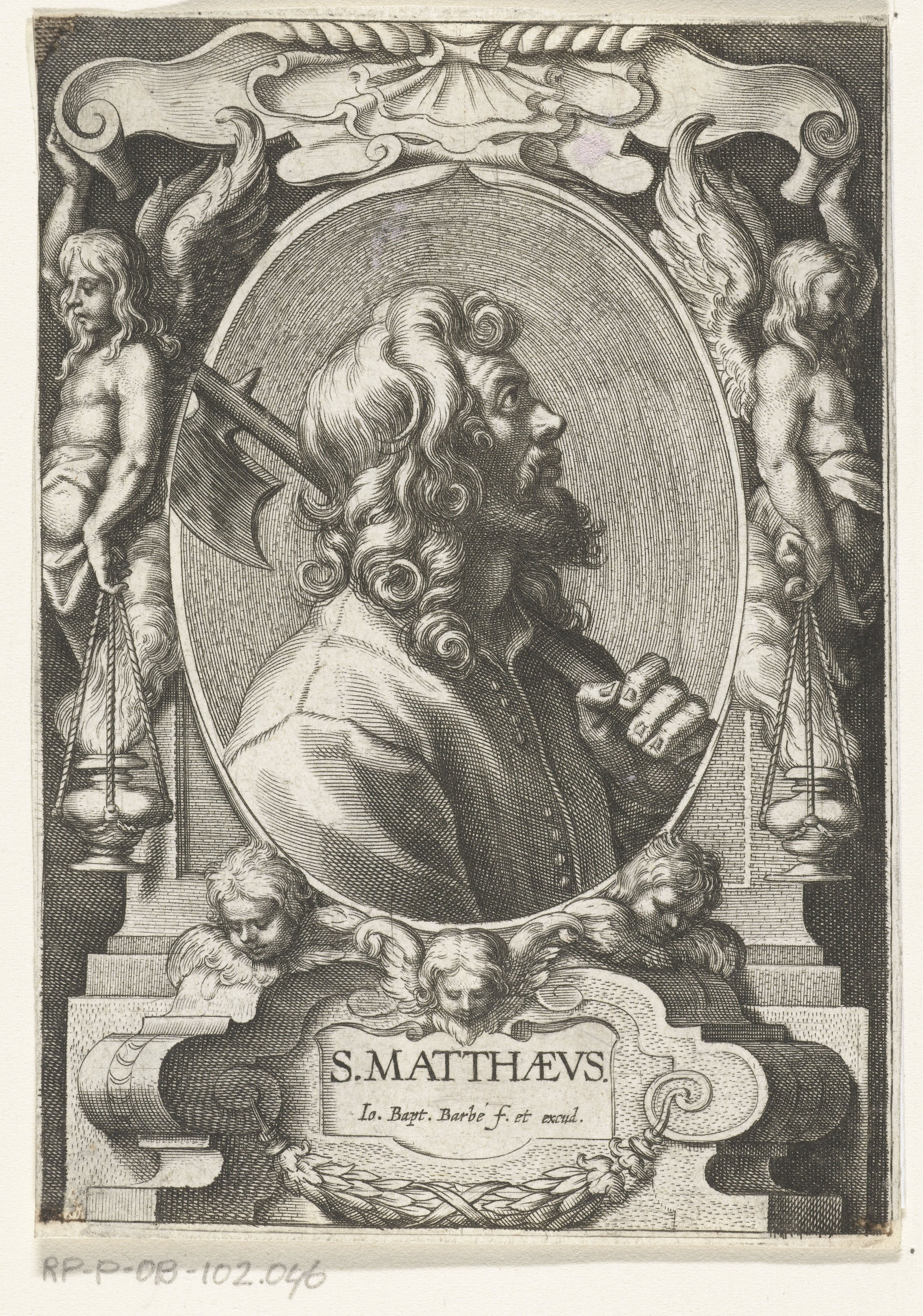
St Matthew with halberd

Not satisfied with what he could learn from famous artists from his time working in Antwerp, Barbé travelled to Italy to perfect his art. During his stay in Italy which likely commenced in 1606, he was in contact with Rubens and commenced to make reproductive engravings after Rubens' works. Upon his return from Italy he became in 1610 a master of the Antwerp Guild of St. Luke. Later when Barbé was involved in judicial action against the engraver Nicolaas Lauwers for infringement of privileges relating to prints he had created, he received the support of Rubens.

Barbé married Christien (or Christina) Wierix, the daughter of the prominent engraver and publisher Hieronymus Wierix on 30 March 1620. According to the contemporary notes of the painter Erasmus Quellinus II, Barbé was a very ugly person, while his daughter, who was a gifted engraver, was counted among 'the most beautiful women of Antwerp'. Hieronymus Wierix, the father of his wife, had died in 1619 before the couple had married. Not long after his marriage Barbé had a set of Dürer prints confiscated in the house of his deceased father-in-law in 1620. In 1635 Barbé went even further in order to lay his hands on some copper plates from members of the Wiericx family. His sister-in-law Cecilia Wiericx (born in 1592) had moved in with Barbé and his wife Christien in 1620. She had brought with her some furniture and many precious copper plates, which she had handed to Barbé. They wanted to use the plates to make prints, with the goal of selling them for export. After some time Cecilia wanted to make a final balance of the sales and have the profits distributed, Barbé did not hesitate to have his sister-in-law Cecilia declared insane in order to put her property under legal detention.

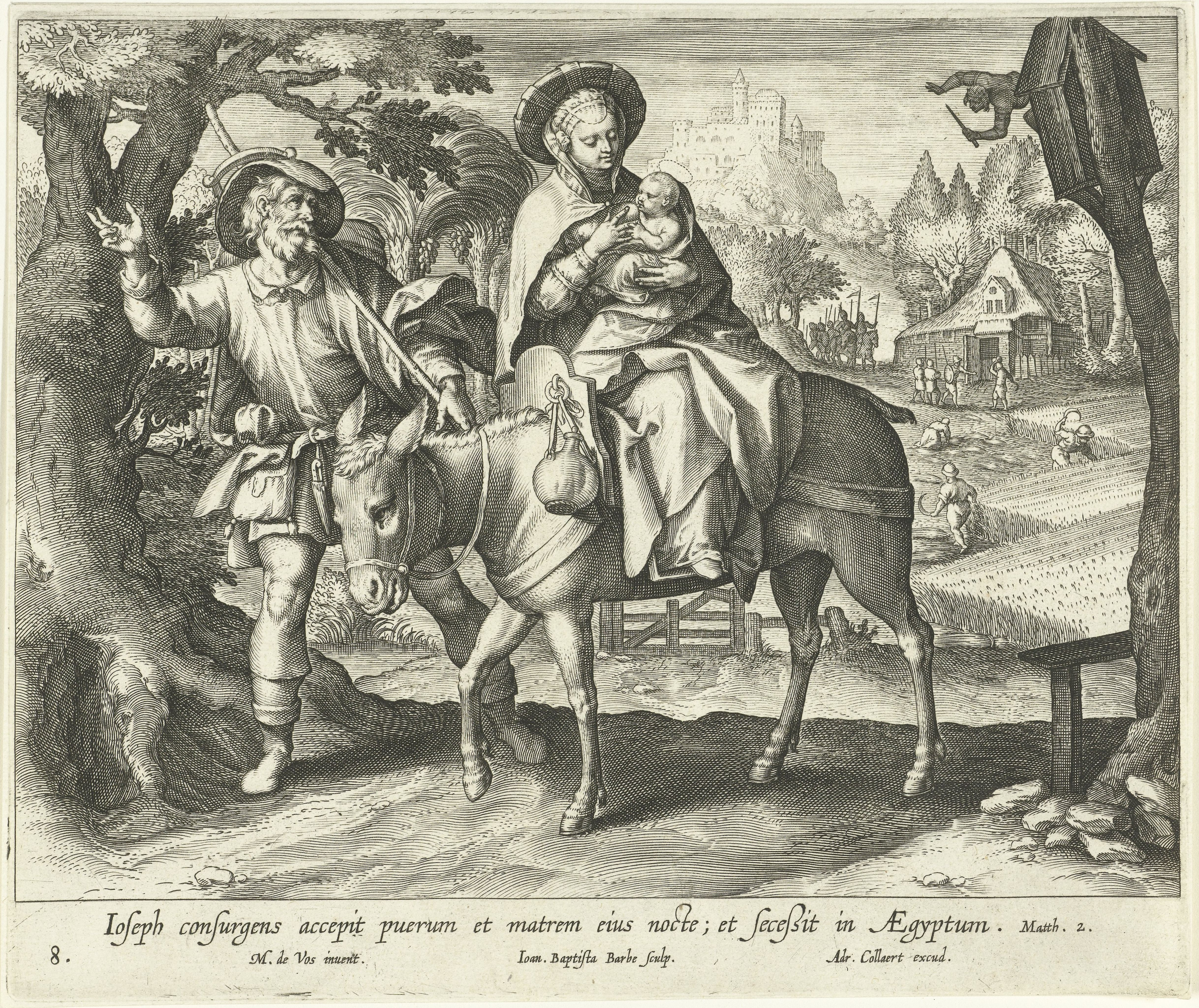
Flight into Egypt, after Maerten de Vos

Barbé was active in the local chamber of rhetoric the Violieren, which was connected with the Antwerp Guild of Saint Luke. He was the Guild's deacon in 1627.

Anthony van Dyck painted a portrait of the artist, which was engraved by Bolswert and included in van Dyck's "Iconography" (Icones Principum Virorum), a collection of portraits of leading personalities of van Dyck's time.

Barbé died in Antwerp in 1649.

== Work ==
Barbé was active as an engraver, publisher and art dealer. He made engravings after his own designs and also made reproductive engravings after the leading Flemish and foreign artists of his time. He designed many devotional prints, which he sold in his own shop. On his return to Antwerp, Barbé engraved several small and middle-sized plates in a very neat manner and in a style very similar to that of Wiericx.

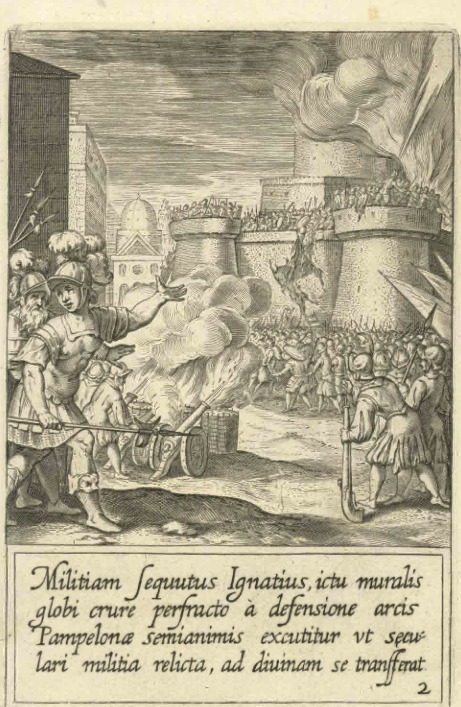
Saint Ignatius while a soldier

Contemporary artists after whose designs Barbé worked included Theodoor van Loon and Abraham van Diepenbeeck.

Barbé had a close relationship with Rubens whose works he had already started to engrave when both artists were residing in Italy. Upon his return to Antwerp, he continued to engrave many works after Rubens. He is generally presumed to be the engraver (although some sources mention Cornelis Galle the Elder as the engraver) of the prints in the Vita beati P. Ignatii Loiolae, Societatis Iesu fundatoris published in 1609 in Rome on the occasion of the beatification of the Ignatius Loyola, the founder of the Jesuit Order.The work contain 87 copperplate engravings (plus the title page and frontispiece) recounting major events and teachings in the life of Loyola. The designs for the work have traditionally been attributed to Rubens who had a special relationship with the Jesuit Order throughout his career. It is now believed that some of the prints directly go back on designs by Rubens, others had some involvement of Rubens and others not. After the canonisation of Loyola in 1622 a second edition was produced to which was added a print, which had been prepared for the first edition but was not used, representing the canonisation. This work represents the largest illustrated life of the saint.

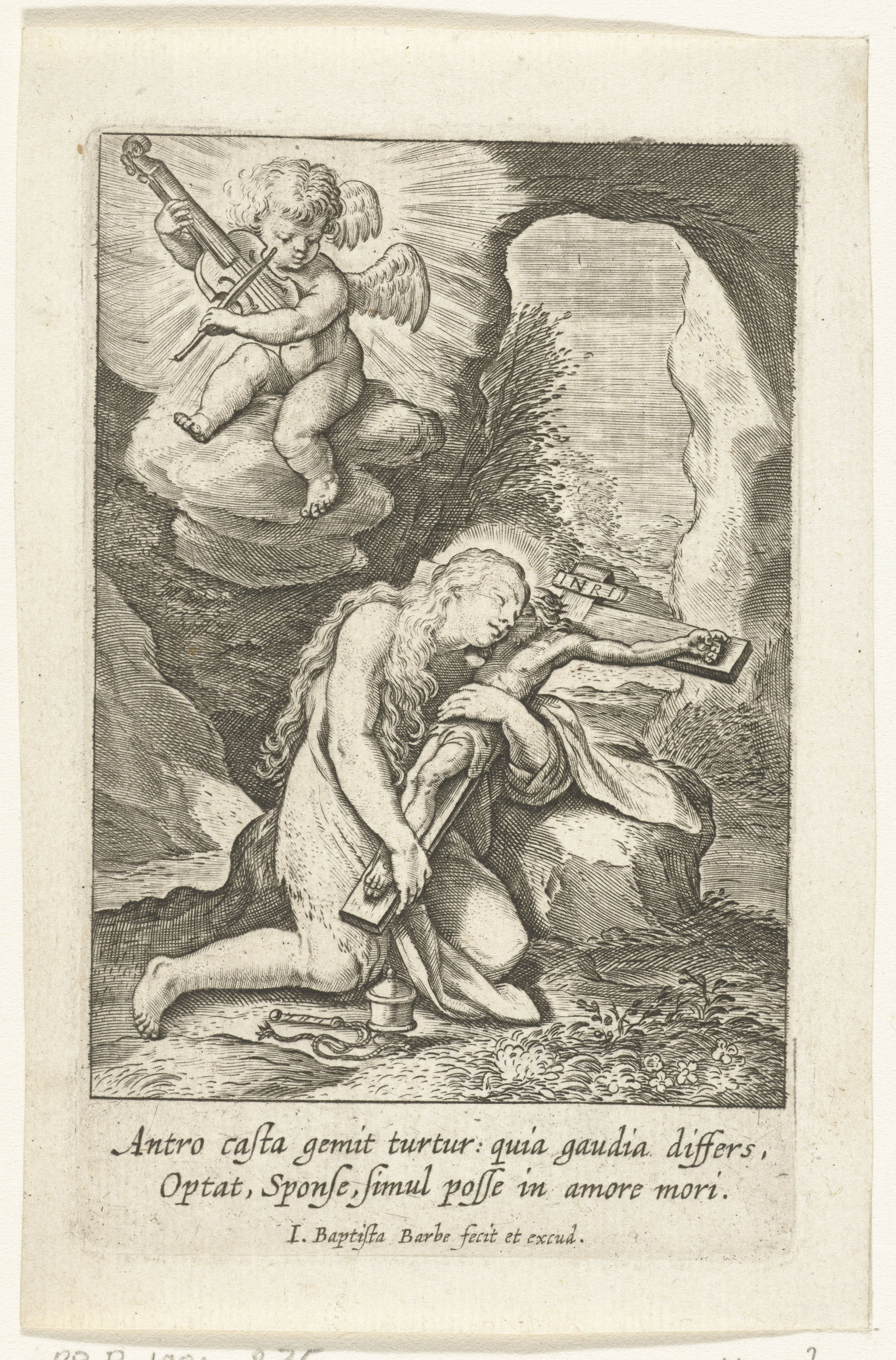
Penitent Magdalen

Barbé published a number of devotional books such as the SS. Apostolorum et Evangelistarum Icones cum suis parergis ('Images of the Apostles and Evangelists with their frames') dated 1620. The designs were made by Theodoor van Loon. The work contains bust-length portraits of the Holy Family, the four evangelists and the 12 apostles. Each portrait is set in a sculptural frame, as is referred to in the title of the work.

Another devotional publication published and engraved by Barbé is the Theatrum vitam, virtutes, miracula Rmi P. Gabrielis Maria Ord. Minorum published in 1642. It comprises 24 plates, which claim to depict the life, virtues and miracles of Father Gabriel Maria, who had assisted in the foundation of the Order of the Annunciation of the Blessed Virgin Mary. Each print is accompanied by an explanatory caption. The title page is in Latin and French. It is followed by a portrait of Gabriel Maria. The designs were drawn by Abraham van Diepenbeeck and engraved by Barbé himself.

== Works after various masters ==
- Holy Family; after G. B. Paggi.
- The Holy Family, with the Infant Jesus embracing St Joseph; after Rubens.
- The Virgin seated on a Throne, holding the Infant, with a Bird; after Frans Francken the Younger.
