= Marie Madeline and Her Son =

Painting by Justus Sustermans

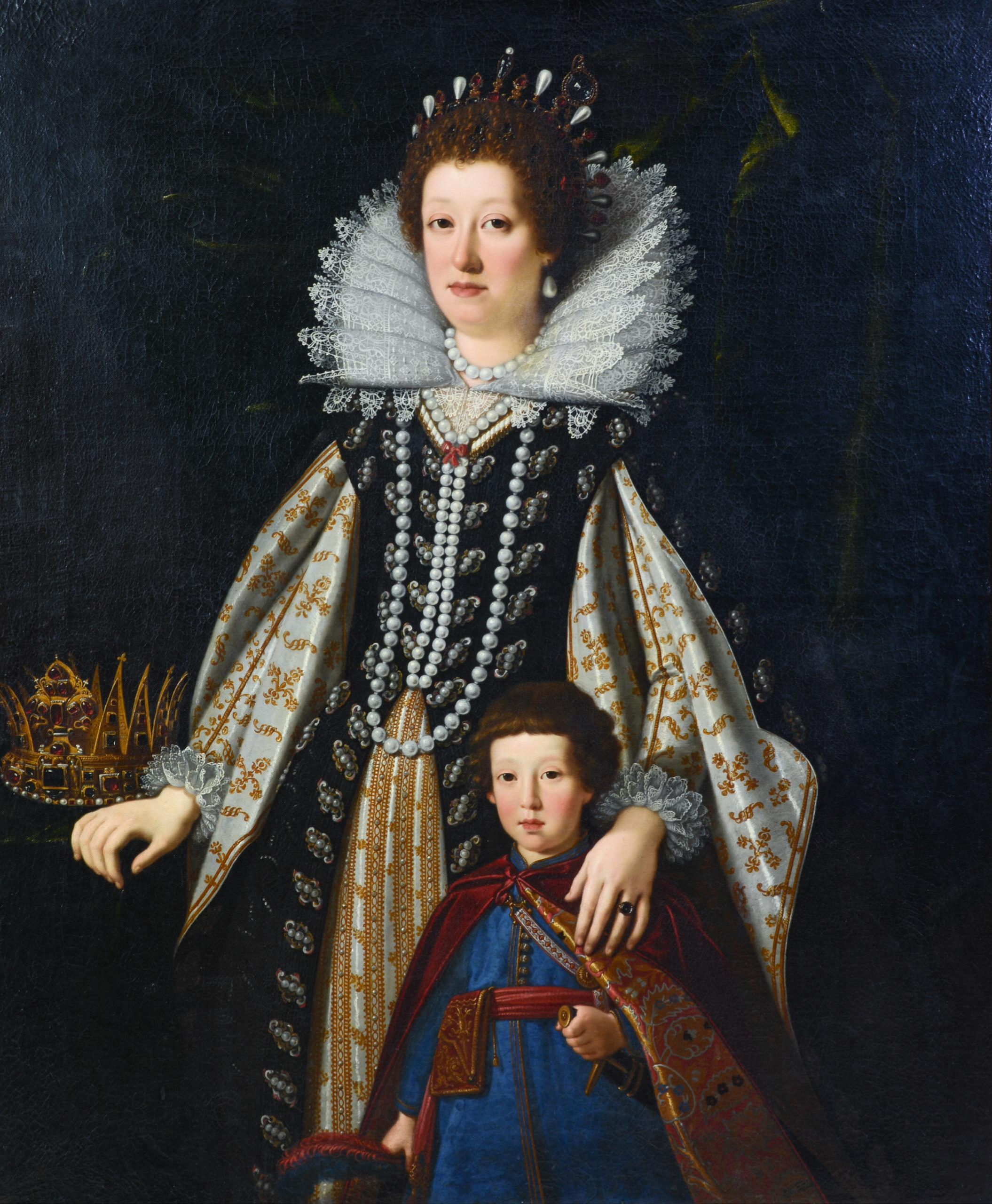
Marie Madeline and Her son (c. 1623) by Justus Sustermans

Maria Maddalena of Austria, Wife of the Grand Duke Cosimo II de' Medici and Sister of the Emperor Ferdinand, with her son, the Future Ferdinand II is a painting by Justus Sustermans and was completed around 1623. It is a part of the permanent collection at the Flint Institute of Arts.

== Description ==
The painting is a double portrait of Archduchess Maria Maddalena of Austria and her son, Ferdinand, the future Ferdinando II de' Medici, Grand Duke of Tuscany. Completed around 1623, after the death of Ferdinand's father, Cosimo II de' Medici, Grand Duke of Tuscany, the painting shows Maria Maddalena in the center, with her right hand next to Cosimo II's crown and her left hand resting on her young son's shoulder. Ferdinand would have been thirteen at the time, but looks to be about 4 or 5 years old in the portrait. In addition, his mother looks much younger in this portrait than in a portrait Sustermans did of her in 1622. It is believed that the first work he completed for the Medici was the 1622 portrait of Cosimo's widow, Marie Madeline, who became Susterman's first patron

In her hair at the top right she is wearing the Florentine Diamond.

== Symbolism ==
=== Age ===
Sustermans was known for painting children accurately, so it is unlikely that the artist didn't know how to make Ferdinand look his age. Since this double portrait was delivered with a posthumous portrait of Ferdinand's father, Cosimo II, it is quite possible that this painting is meant to look to the past, just as the posthumous portrait of Cosimo II looked back to the time when he was alive.

=== Crown ===
By showing the Grand Duke's crown, Sustermans symbolically included Cosimo II in the portrait of his wife and son. Marie Madeline's right hand is next to the crown, while her left hand rests on her son's shoulder. Standing in between the two, Marie Madeline may be suggesting that she is the link between Ferdinand and the rule of Tuscany. By the time the portrait was completed, Marie Madeline was co-regent of the Grand Duchy, along with her mother-in-law Christina of Lorraine. The co-regency continued until Ferdinand II reached the age of 17.
