= Valore and Domenico Casini =

Italian painters

Valore Casini (1590–1660) and Domenico Casini (active, 17th century) were two brothers, both Italian painters, active in Florence, mainly as portraitists in the first half of the 17th century.

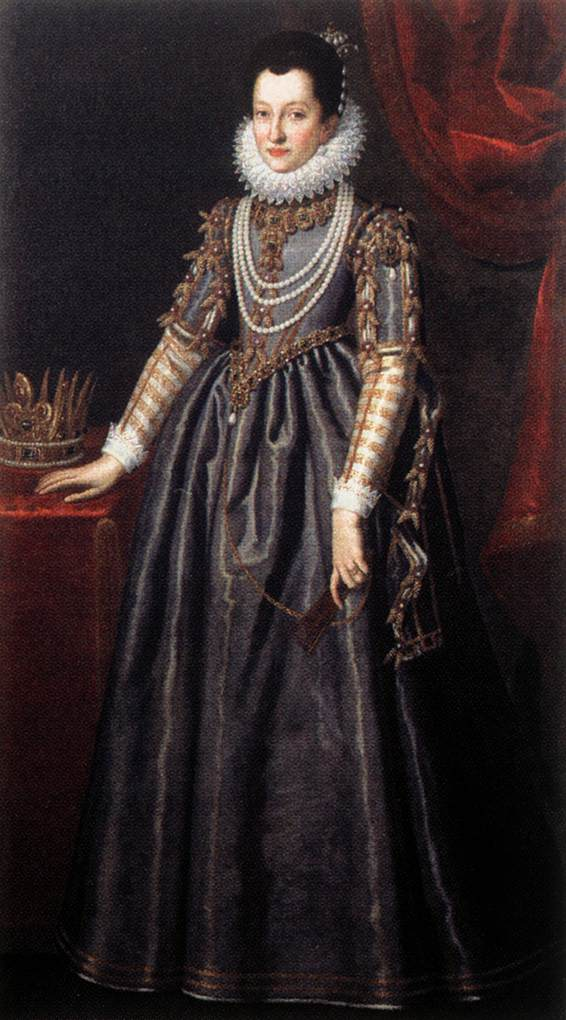
Portrait of Christine of Lorraine

== History ==
They both trained in the studio of Domenico Passignano. Valore particularly was known for his portraits. His brother often completed the vestments of the featured individuals. The brother painted the portraits of Lorenzo, bishop of Fiesole, and his mother Genovessa Popoleschi found over the former's tomb in the Florentine church of Santa Maria in Campo. They painted a portrait of Antonio Susini. One of his pupils was Filippo Furini, called Pippo Sciameroni, who was the father of Francesco Furini.

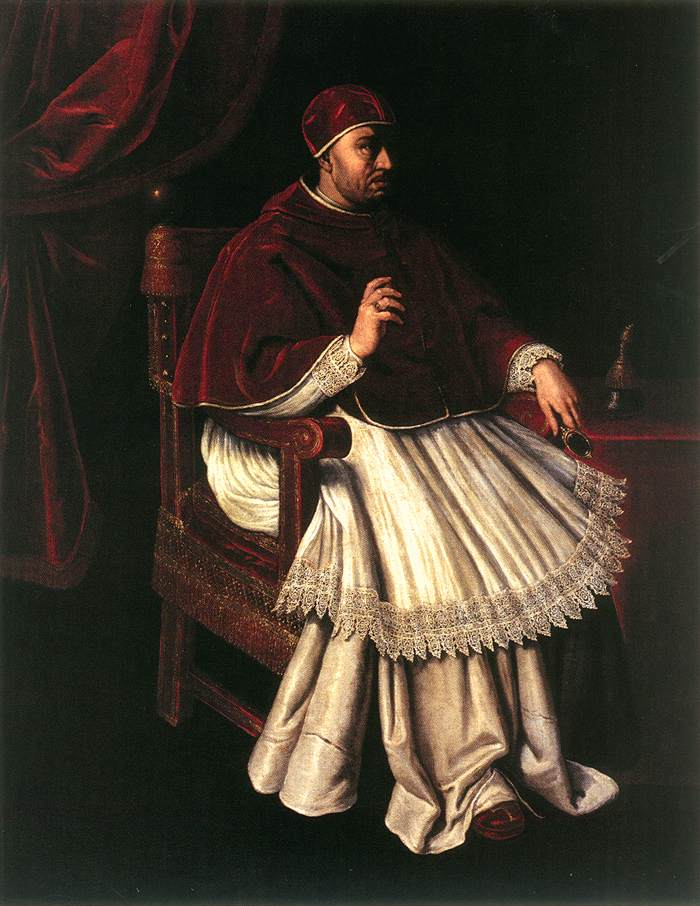
Portrait of Pope Leo X

Two other Italian painters with the same surname are known: Vittore Casini worked with Giorgio Vasari, while Giovanni da Varlungo, a portrait painter, was born in Florence in 1689 and died in 1748.
