= Tower of San Niccolò, Florence =

Coordinates: 43°45′52″N 11°15′53″E

The Tower of San Niccolò, once part of a gate or porta in the former defensive walls of Florence, is now located, isolated in Piazza Giuseppe Poggi, in the district of Oltrarno, Florence, region of Tuscany, Italy. The portal was first erected in 1324 and stands 115 feet tall, which can be accessed through 160 steps.

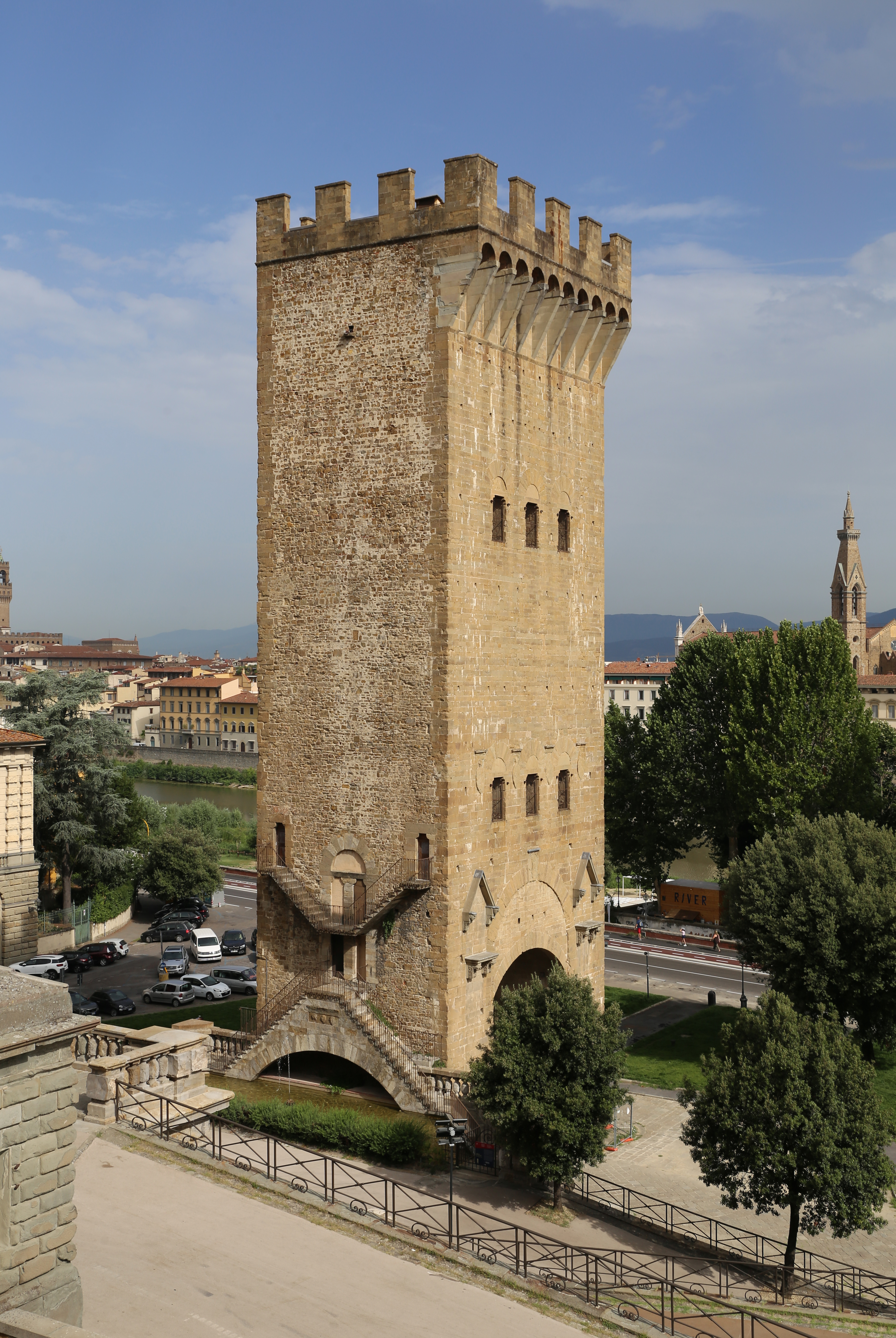
Northern (exterior) façade

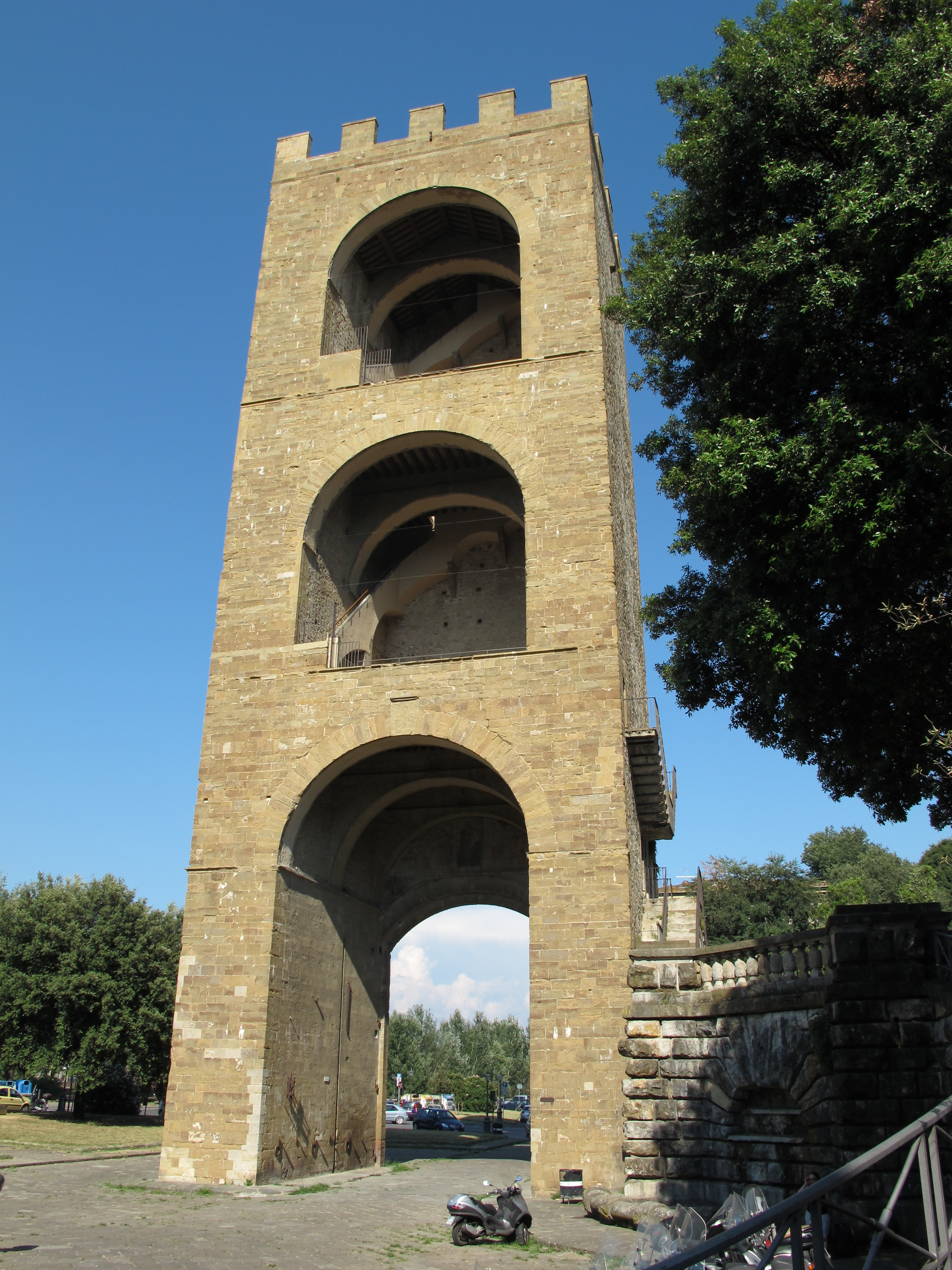
Southern (interior) face

The tower and its gate were elaborated in the designs of Arnolfo di Cambio for circumferential walls around Florence. These walls were, in the main, destroyed in the 19th century as a project of urban renewal, Risanamento, in part led by Giuseppe Poggi. This tower was spared, in part because of its panoramic view of the city. There are 160 steps to the summit.
