= Domenico Passignano =

Italian painter (1559–1638)

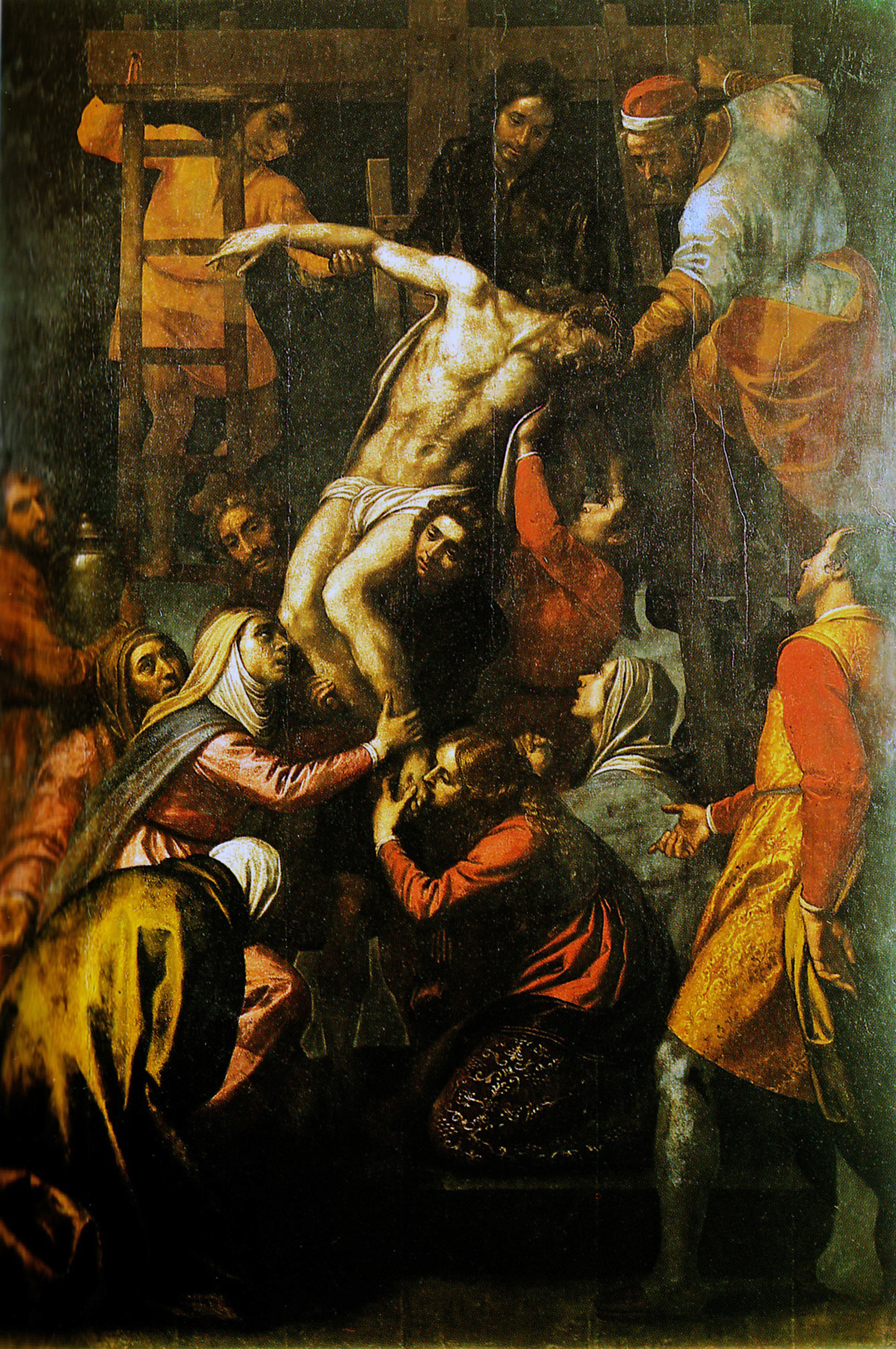
- Deposition from the Cross
- Born: Domenico Crespi or Cresti; 1559; Passignano, Duchy of Florence
- Died: 17 May 1638 (aged 78–79); Florence, Grand Duchy of Tuscany
- Known for: Painting
- Movement: late-Renaissance, Counter-Mannerism

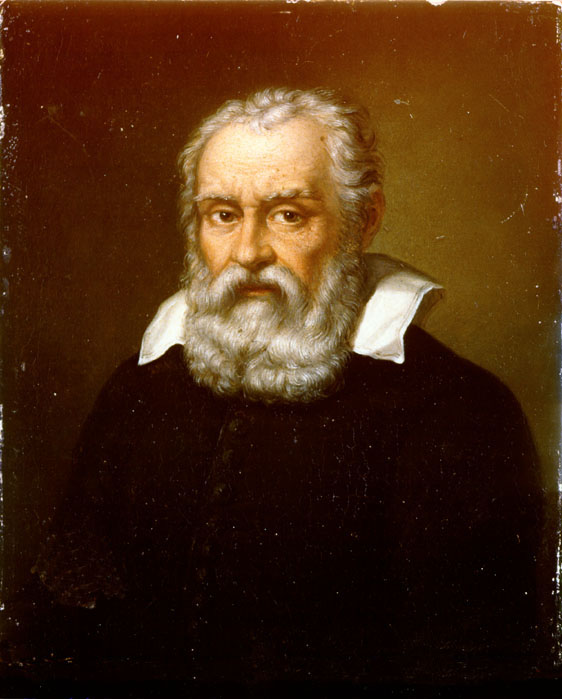
Portrait of Galileo Galilei

Domenico Passignano (1559 – 17 May 1638), born Domenico Cresti or Crespi, was an Italian painter of a late-Renaissance or Counter-Maniera (Counter-Mannerism) style that emerged in Florence towards the end of the 16th century.

== Biography ==
Cresti was born in Passignano, currently a frazione of Barberino Tavarnelle about 30 km south of Florence, and was educated by the local Vallombrosan monks. He started his works in the stylized Tuscan manner, working with Giovanni Battista Naldini and Girolamo Macchietti. After travelling from Rome to Venice (1581–1589), he came under the influence of Tintoretto's style. He had travelled to Venice as an assistant to Federico Zuccari, who had employed him previously in the completion of Giorgio Vasari's The Last Judgment on the ceiling of the dome of Florence Cathedral.

He was known to paint with great speed; however, as he used less paint in order to work quickly, most of his works have been severely damaged by time. As a result of this gift, he was nicknamed Passa Ognuno ("[He] Passes Everyone") – a possible play upon the name of his birthplace.

In Florence, he painted frescoes of the Translation and Funeral of Saint Antoninus (1589) for the Cappella Salviati in San Marco and Preaching of John the Baptist (1590) for San Michele Visdomini. He painted a Nativity (1594) for Lucca's Duomo di San Martino. Other works by Passignano can be found in the church of Sant'Andrea della Valle (Barberini Chapel), the Basilica of Santa Maria Maggiore (Baptistery ceilings) and Santa Maria in Vallicella (altarpiece of the Chapel of the Annunciation) in Rome, San Frediano in Pisa, in the Uffizi Gallery, and his Our Lady of the Jacobins (1630) in the Besançon Cathedral. In addition, he painted famous portraits of Galileo and Michelangelo. He also painted frescoes for the Vallumbrosan Badia di Passignano in his hometown.

Among his pupils were the brothers Valore and Domenico Casini, Pietro Sorri, Cesare Dandini, and Pietro Ricchi.

Passignano died at Florence in 1638.

== Selected works ==
- Ganymede and Jupiter, University Oklahoma Museum of Art
- The Allegory of Chastity,
- Wedding Banquet of Grand Duke Ferdinand I de Medici,
- Bathers at San Niccolò, 1600
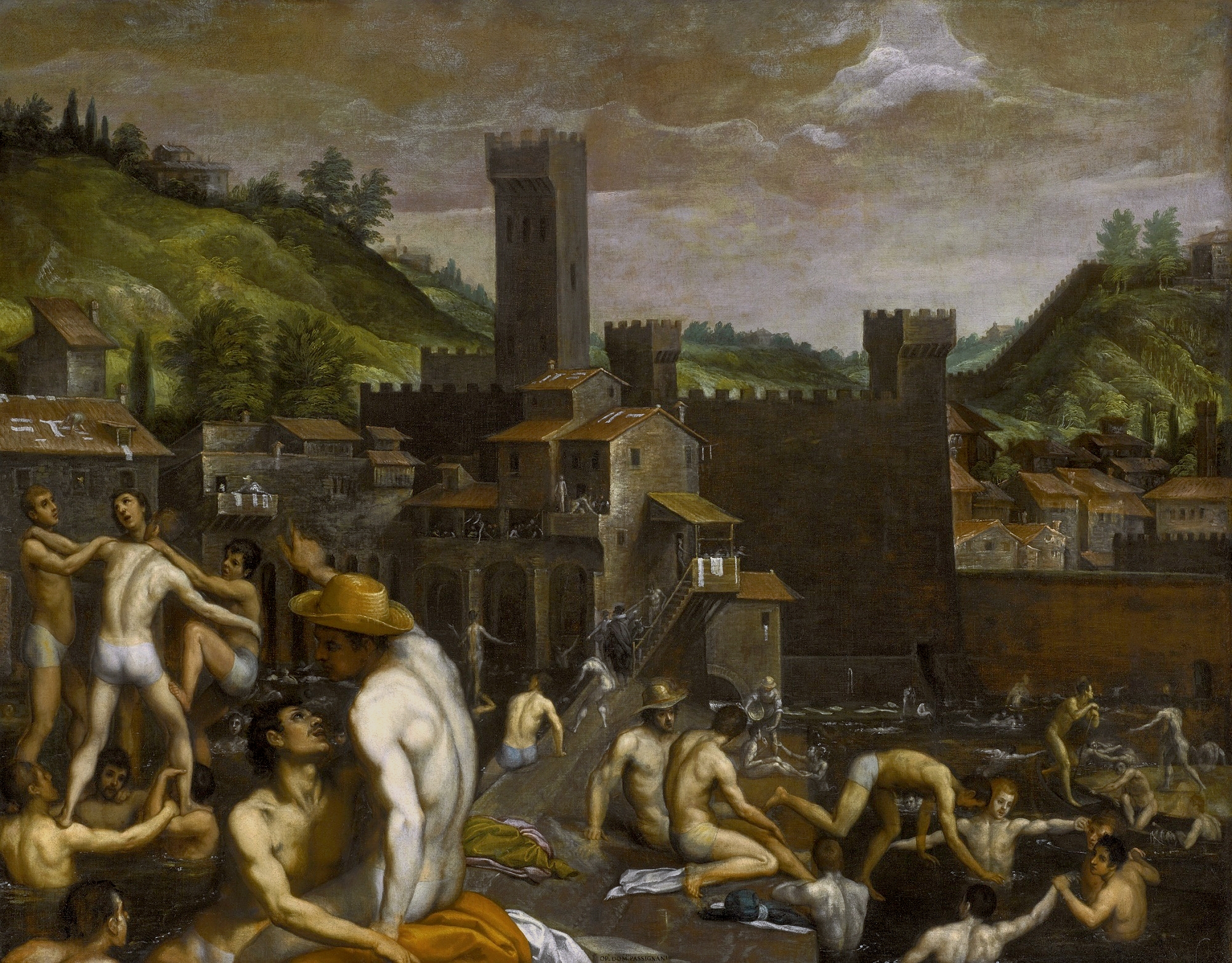
Bathers at San Niccolò, 1600

Sketch of Charity flanked by Glory and Happiness, circa 1608

== Sources & References ==
- Freedberg, Sydney J. (1993). Pelican History of Art (ed.). Painting in Italy, 1500–1600. Penguin Books Ltd. pp. 625–626.
- Herbermann, Charles, ed. (1913). "Domenico Passignano" . Catholic Encyclopedia. New York: Robert Appleton Company.
