= Willem de Vos (painter) =

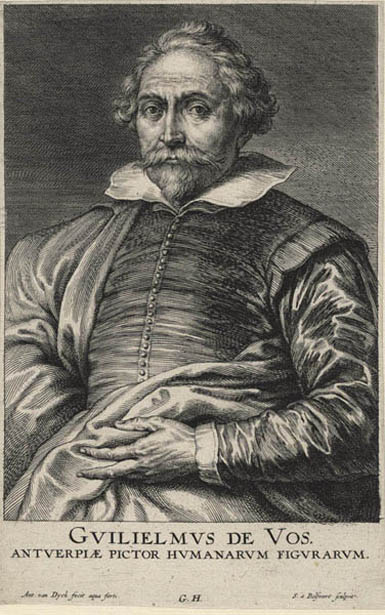
Willem de Vos, engraved by Schelte a Bolswert after a painting by van Dyck.

Willem de Vos (c. 1593 – c. 1629) was a Flemish Baroque painter from Antwerp.

== Biography ==
He was a nephew of the painter Maerten de Vos and his students included Justus Sustermans. His portrait was engraved by Anthony van Dyck for his iconography series. He is mentioned in Cornelis de Bie's book of artists as Guiliam de Vos.
