= Francesco Maria della Rovere =

Francesco Maria della Rovere may refer to the following members of the Della Rovere dynasty:

- Francesco Maria I della Rovere, duke of Urbino
- Francesco Maria II della Rovere, duke of Urbino
