= Livia della Rovere =

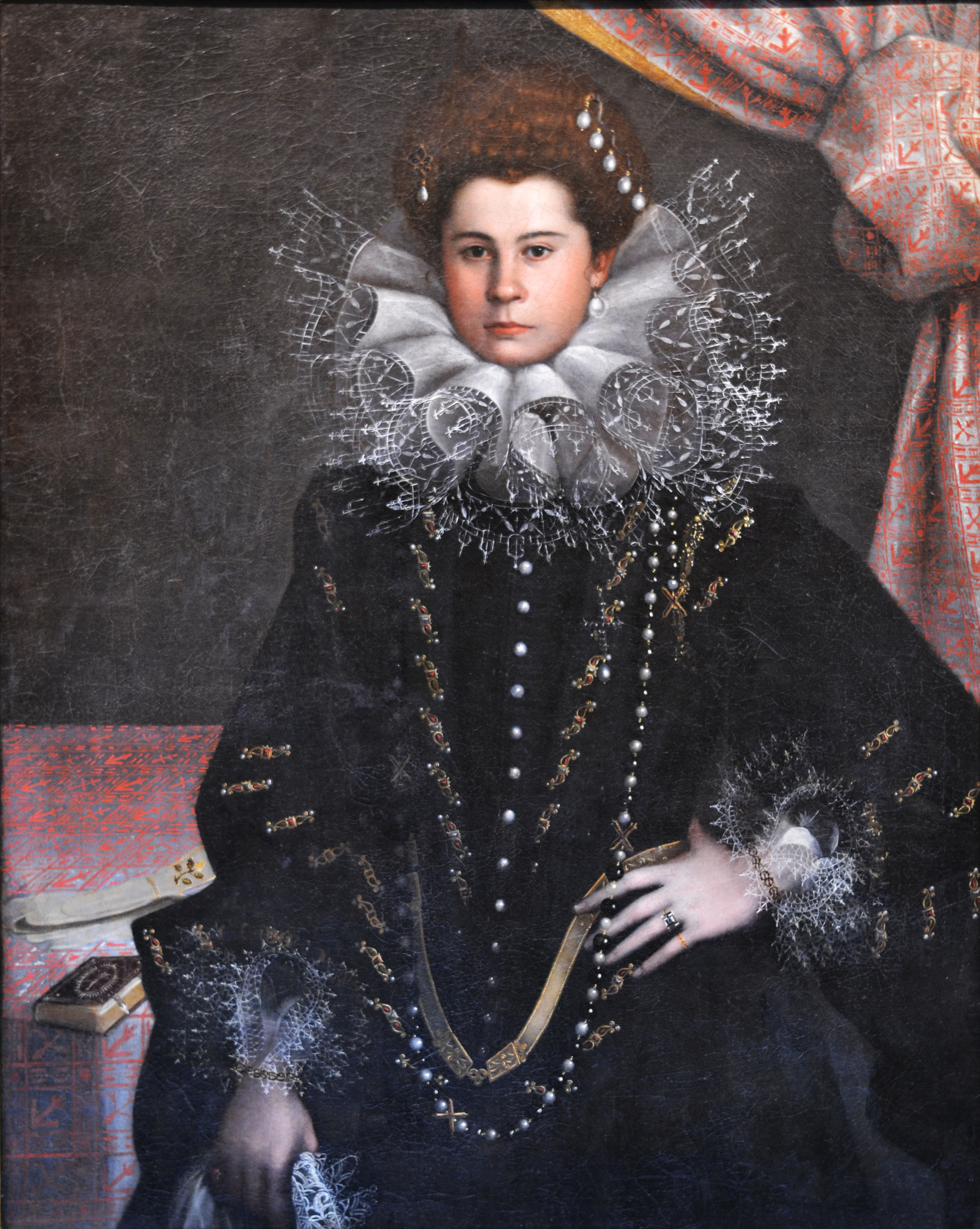

Duchess consort of Urbino Lady consort of Pesaro
- Tenure: 26 April 1599 – 3 November 1621
- Tenure: 28 June 1623 – 23 April 1631
- Born: 16 December 1585; Ferrara, Duchy of Ferrara
- Died: 6 July 1641 (aged 55); Castelleone di Suasa, Papal States
- Burial: Corpus Domini Monastery, Pesaro
- Spouse: Francesco Maria II della Rovere, Duke of Urbino (m. 1599; died 1631)
- Issue: Federico Ubaldo della Rovere, Duke of Urbino
- House: House of della Rovere
- Father: Ippolito della Rovere, Lord of Castelleone and Marquess of San Lorenzo in Campo
- Mother: Isabella Vitelli, Marchioness dell'Amatrice

Livia della Rovere (16 December 1585 – 6 July 1641) was an Italian noblewoman of the House of della Rovere and the last Duchess of Urbino (1599–1631).

== Life ==
Born in Pesaro on 16 December 1585, she was the eldest child of Ippolito della Rovere, Lord of Castelleone and Montalfoglio and Marquess of San Lorenzo in Campo –an illegitimate but later legitimised son of Cardinal Giulio Feltrio della Rovere– and his wife Isabella Vitelli, Marchioness dell'Amatrice. She had one brother, Giulio (later Marquess of San Lorenzo in Campo and dell'Amatrice) and at least four sisters: Lucrezia (wife of Marcantonio Lante, later Marquess of San Lorenzo in Campo in succession of his brother-in-law; their second son was Ippolito Lante Montefeltro della Rovere, later 1st Duke of Bomarzo and founder of the Lante Montefeltro della Rovere family, only surviving descendants of Federico da Montefeltro), Elisabetta (who died in infancy), Eleonora and Livia (both nuns at the Corpus Domini monastery at Pesaro).

=== The destiny of the Duchy of Urbino ===
Francesco Maria II della Rovere, Duke of Urbino, had been married since 1570 to Lucrezia d'Este, the daughter of Ercole II, Duke of Ferrara. Their marriage was unhappy and childless not only because the large age difference between them but also due to Lucrezia's notorious love affairs. Separated in 1578 but without any possibility of annulment, she returned to Ferrara, where she died in 1598.

As an old widower, Francesco Maria II resigned himself to the extinction of his dynasty and the annexation of the Duchy of Urbino to the Papal States. This uncertainty concerned his subjects who, under the Della Rovere family, had experienced a golden age. The Della Rovere estates enjoyed low taxes, in comparison with territories under direct church control, while its towns, even the smaller ones, were enriched with monuments and fortifications. The court of Urbino had become one of the most prestigious in Europe with renowned artists such as (Raphael, Piero della Francesca and Titian) thanks to the patronage of the ruling family. It was in this climate of fear for the fate of the Duchy that the councilors and the population urged the Duke to remarry, and he reluctantly agreed.

=== Marriage ===
After the death of her mother during the birth of her brother Giulio in 1598, Livia and her sisters were placed in the Santa Maddalena convent in Pesaro, from where she was removed after being chosen by her father to be the new bride of the Duke of Urbino, her second cousin (son of her grandfather's brother, Guidobaldo II della Rovere). After obtaining dispensation from Pope Clement VIII, the marriage between Livia and Francesco Maria II took place on 26 April 1599 in Casteldurante (now Urbania) in a rather modest ceremony.

From the beginning, the union was completely unhappy: while the 14-year-old bride resented the fact to be married with a man old enough to be her father, the 50-year-old groom contracted this marriage with the sole purpose of saving the Della Rovere family from extinction and preserving the independence of the Duchy of Urbino; in consequence, he never showed any tenderness or affection to Livia, who was also little attracted to her old husband. In addition, soon Francesco Maria II and his father-in-law Ippolito fell out, and the latter was forced to leave the court; despite Livia's several attempts to reconcile them, they remained estranged.

The disgrace of both her father Ippolito and uncle Cardinal Giuliano isolated the Duchess, and with the death of her mother-in-law Vittoria Farnese (who had convinced her son to marry Livia) on 13 December 1602 she lost her only support. Now at the mercy of her husband, she feared the worst; however, his attitude towards her changed when in November 1604 Livia found herself finally pregnant, with the notice officially announced to the court in January 1605.

=== The heir ===
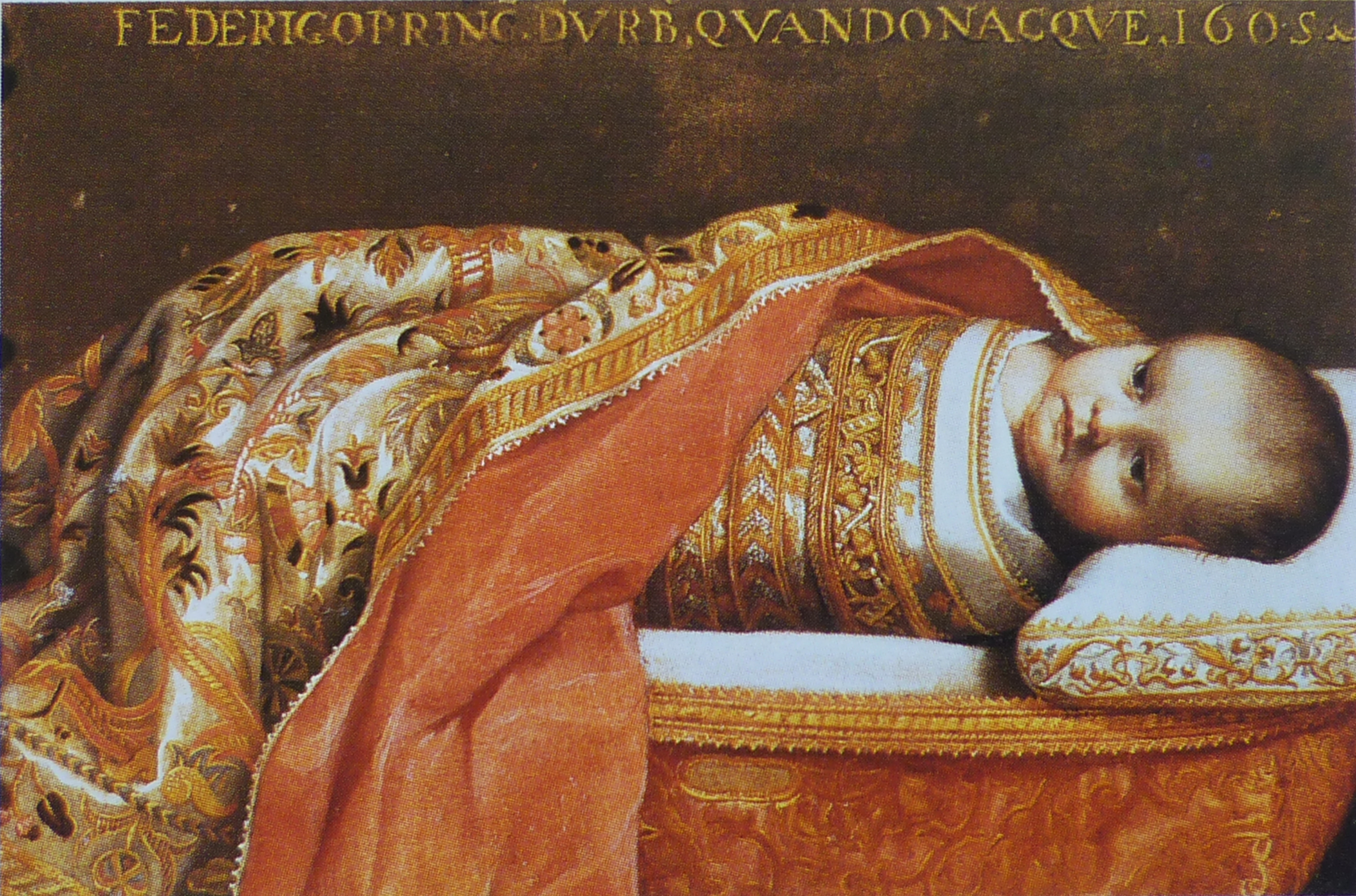
Federico Ubaldo della Rovere as a child. The commissioning of this special painting shows the importance of the long-awaited male heir.

On 16 May 1605 at the Ducal Palace of Pesaro, Livia gave birth a son, Federico Ubaldo della Rovere. The birth of a long-awaited male-heir repaired the relations between Livia and Francesco Maria II for a while, but the aging Duke showed little interest in his son, leaving him under the affectionate care of his mother for some time; however, he eventually removed the child from Livia's care and sent him to Florence to continue with his education, while she was virtually imprisoned in the Casteldurante Palace. Separated from her son, Livia wrote several letters to him: for example, in one of them dated 19 June 1616 she called herself as his "Most Loving Mother, who loves you as her own soul" (Amorevolissima madre, che vi ama quanto l'anima). The distance from both parents meant that Federico Ubaldo became in a troubled child and later in an arrogant and reckless teenager.

The marriage of Federico Ubaldo with Claudia de' Medici in 1621, marked not only the beginning of the binding of the Duchy of Urbino with the House of Medici but also the personal rule of Livia's son as Duke of Urbino following his father's abdication. The arrival of her daughter-in-law at court and the birth of her granddaughter, Vittoria Feltria on 7 February 1622 was a source of great joy for the Duchess, who began to spend some time with her son and his family between Pesaro and Urbino. However, the serene new family life didn't last long: her husband, made suspicious by his advisors about Livia's behavior, ordered her to return to him and stay away from their son.

=== Towards the extinction of the Duchy of Urbino ===
Federico Ubaldo died suddenly on 29 June 1623, after an epileptic attack; with his death, the destiny of Livia and the Duchy of Urbino changed again, because the dynasty was again without a direct male-heir. The young Duke was buried at Urbino Cathedral. In October, Claudia and her daughter Vittoria moved to the Medici court, leaving Livia devastated by the loss of her beloved granddaughter and alone with her elderly and almost paralyzed husband, who after the death of their son assumed the Ducal title once more.

=== Death of the Duke ===
Francesco Maria II died on 28 April 1631, leaving Livia as a completely isolated widow at the age of forty-six. The fate of the Duchy of Urbino was sealed and Pope Urban VIII gave her as modest compensation the towns of Rocca Contrada (now Arcevia) and Corinaldo, to which were added later Gradara and San Lorenzo in Campo, the former estates of her father. She was still separated from her brother Giulio della Rovere (who died in 1636) and was prevented from moving near her granddaughter in Florence, despite her good relations with the Medici court and the repeated invitations to live there. The only exception to her isolation was the wedding of Vittoria (heiress to all of the allodial property of the Della Rovere family, which included art and funds of the Duchy) with Ferdinando II de' Medici, Grand Duke of Tuscany in 1637.

=== Last years ===
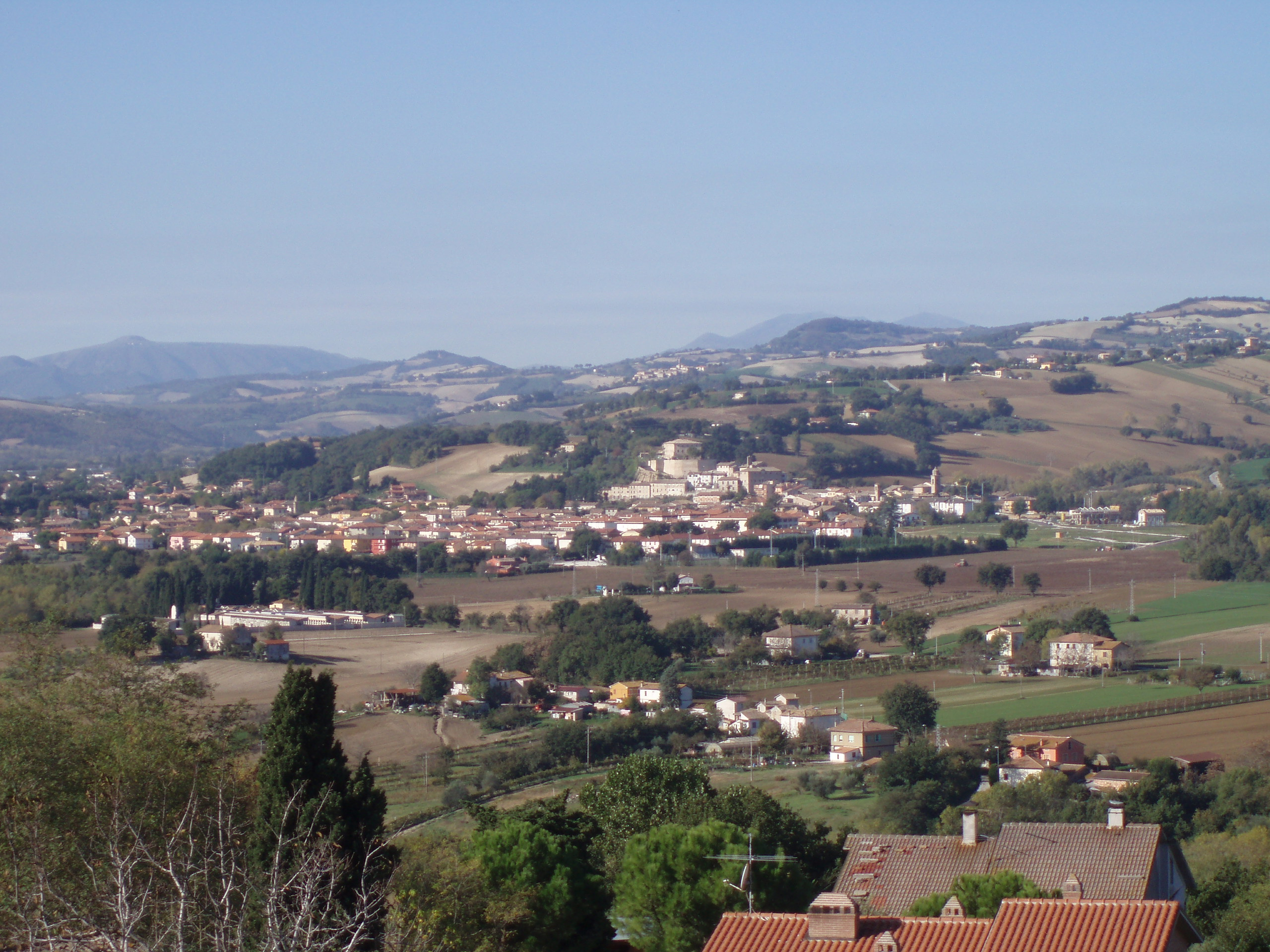
The view over San Lorenzo in Campo from Castelleone di Suasa, where Livia was raised and spent the latter part of her life in reclusion.

Livia retired to the paternal estate of Castelleone di Suasa in the palace built there by her father. Here she spent the last years of her life, dying on 6 July 1641 aged 55. She was buried in the Corpus Domini convent of Pesaro (where her sister and namesake Livia was Abbess), according to her will preserved in the parish archives documenteds of Castelleone:

A dì 6 Julio 1641. La ser(enissi)ma Livia Duchessa d'Urbino morì di età di anni 60 incirca et hebbe tutti li SS.mi sacramenti dal sig. D. Carlo Rivi pievano et il corpo fu portato a Pesaro nella chiesa delle moniche del Corpus Domini.

Owner of a huge amount of artistic works and the wealth accumulated over the years by the Ducal family, she appointed her granddaughter Vittoria della Rovere as her sole heiress. Following this, most of the artistic heritage of the Della Rovere family was then removed from Urbino (for example, the double portrait of the Dukes of Urbino, Federico da Montefeltro and Battista Sforza, of Piero della Francesca) and transferred to Florence to the collections of the Medici or to Rome in the Papal Palaces.

== Bibliography ==
- Giovanna Solari: 22 Storie dei Duchi di Urbino tra il Sole e la Luna, Mondadori, Milan 1973.
- Alberto Polverari (ed.): Castelleone di Suasa, Vol. 1° "Vicende storiche", Vol. 2° "Vita castellana" (Lanfranco Berti - Renzo Fiorani - Umberto Gasparini - Elvio Grossi - Raoul Mancinelli - Alberto Polverari - Silvana Vagnini Cocci), Ed. Tecnostampa, Ostra Vetere 1984/1989.
- Renzo Fiorani: Tra Misa e Metauro. Allegrezze e preoccupazioni per Federico Ubaldo della Rovere, Archeoclub d'Italia di Castelleone di Suasa, 2005.
