= Claudia de' Medici =

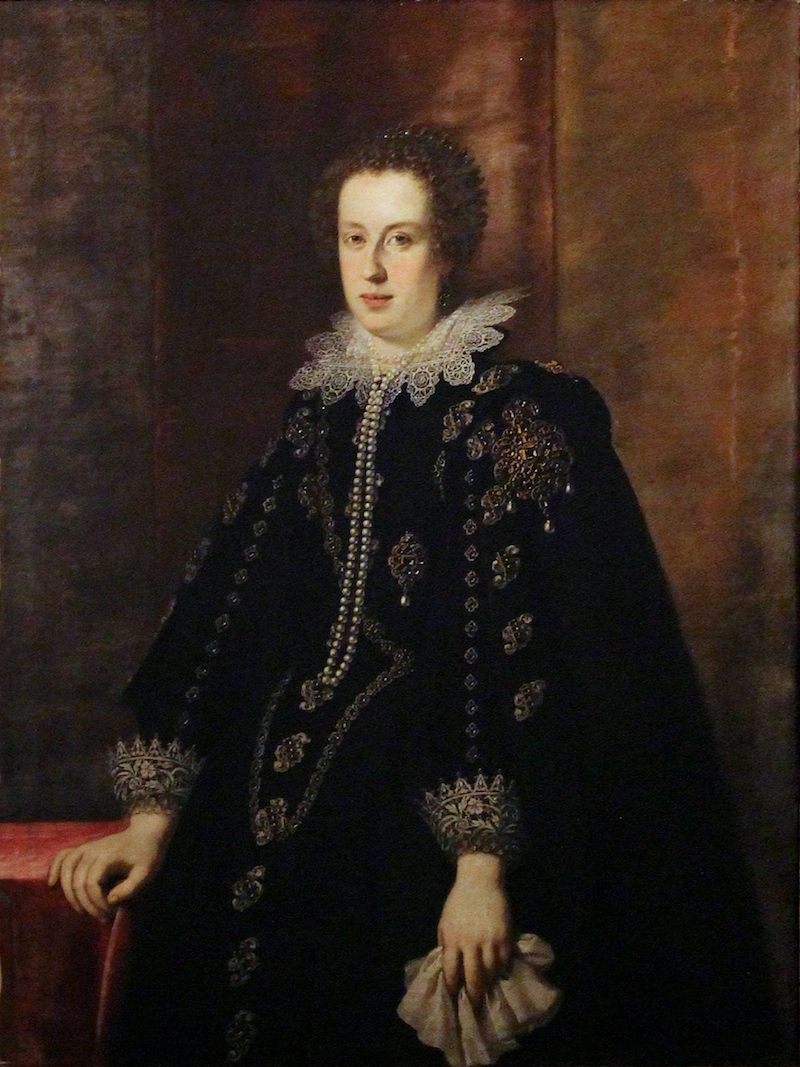
- Portrait by Justus Sustermans, 1626

Archduchess consort of Further Austria
- Tenure: 19 April 1626 –13 September 1632

Duchess consort of Urbino
- Tenure: 3 November 1621 – 28 June 1623
- Born: 4 June 1604; Palazzo Pitti, Florence, Grand Duchy of Tuscany
- Died: 25 December 1648 (aged 44); Hofburg, Innsbruck, County of Tyrol, Holy Roman Empire
- Spouse: Federico della Rovere, Duke of Urbino (m. 1621; died 1623) Leopold V, Archduke of Austria (m. 1626; died 1632)
- Issue: Vittoria, Grand Duchess of Tuscany; Archduke Ferdinand Charles; Isabella Clara, Duchess of Mantua; Archduke Sigismund Francis; Maria Leopoldine, Holy Roman Empress
- House: Medici
- Father: Ferdinando I de' Medici
- Mother: Christina of Lorraine

Claudia de' Medici (4 June 1604 – 25 December 1648) was by birth a Tuscan princess and by her marriage to Leopold V an archduchess of Austria and from 1632 until 1646 regent of the Austrian County of Tyrol during the minority of her son Ferdinand Charles.

== Biography ==
=== Early life ===
Born in Florence into the House of Medici, Claudia was the youngest daughter of Ferdinando I de' Medici, Grand Duke of Tuscany and his wife, Christina of Lorraine. She was named after her grandmother Claude of Valois.

=== Duchess of Urbino ===
In 1620, she married Federico Ubaldo della Rovere, the only son of Francesco Maria II della Rovere, Duke of Urbino. Their only child, Vittoria, went on to marry the Grand Duke of Tuscany. Federico Ubaldo della Rovere died suddenly on 29 June 1623.

=== Archduchess of Tyrol ===
After her husband's premature death, she was married, on 19 April 1626, to Leopold V, Archduke of Austria, and thus became Archduchess consort of Austria.

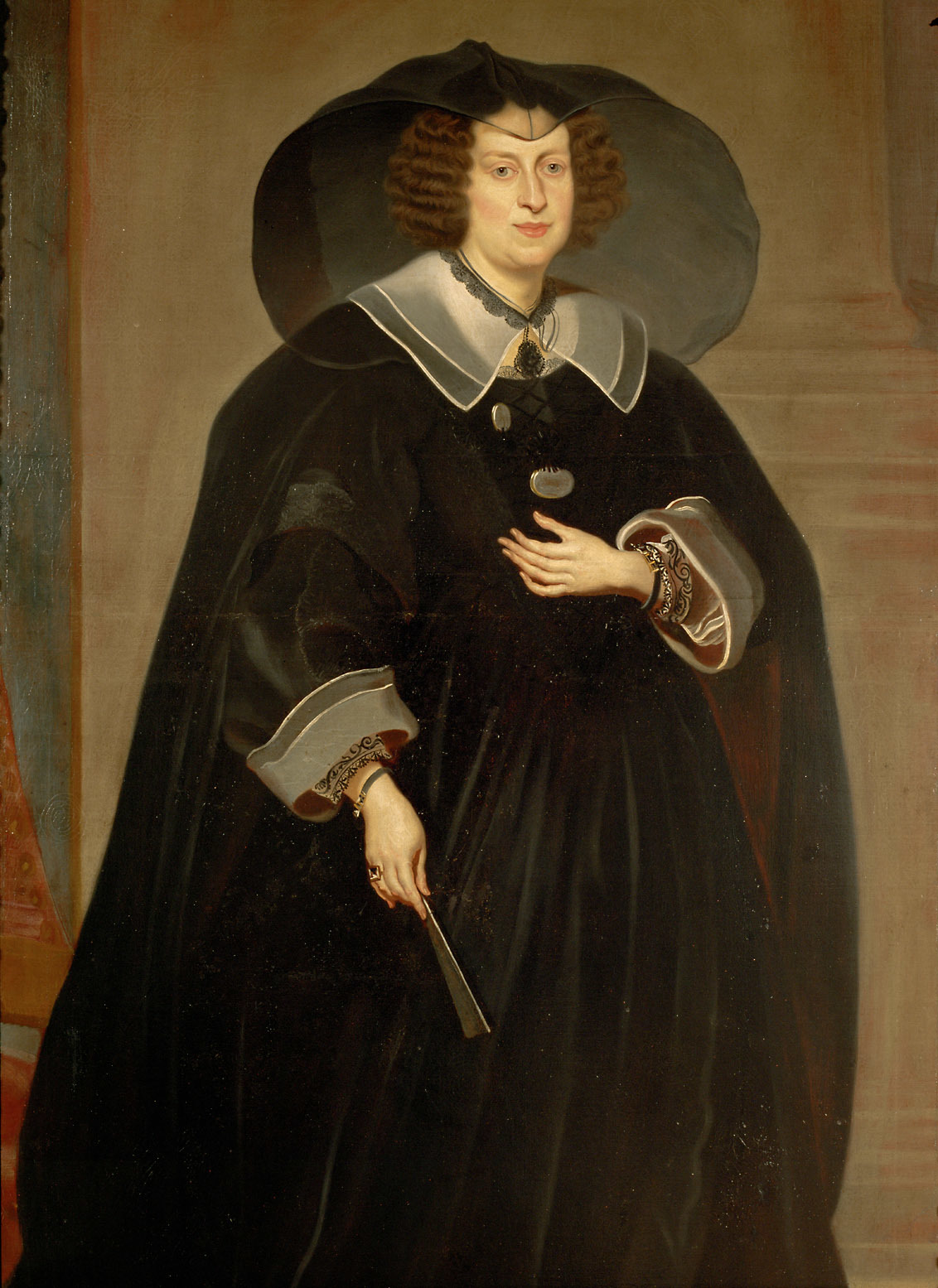
Claudia de' Medici in Widow's Dress, by Frans Luycx c. 1648

=== Regent of Tyrol ===
On the death of her husband in 1632, she assumed a regency in the name of her son Ferdinand Charles who was the ruler of the Princely County of Tyrol. Claudia, along with five directors, held the post until 1646. She died at Innsbruck in 1648.

== Issue ==
She had one child by Federico Ubaldo della Rovere:

1. Vittoria della Rovere (1622–1694) married Ferdinando II de' Medici, Grand Duke of Tuscany and had issue,

She had five children by Archduke Leopold V of Austria:

1. Maria Eleonora of Austria (1627–1629) died in infancy.
2. Ferdinand Charles of Austria (1628–1662) married Anna de' Medici
3. Isabella Clara of Austria (1629–1685), who married Charles III, Duke of Mantua and had issue.
4. Sigismund Francis of Austria (1630–1665), Count of Tyrol and Regent of Further Austria, who married Countess Palatine Maria Hedwig Auguste of Sulzbach (1650–1681) and had no issue.
5. Maria Leopoldine of Austria (1632–1649), who married Holy Roman Emperor Ferdinand III (1608–1657)

== Ancestors ==
Ancestors of Claudia de' Medici

16. Giovanni di Pierfrancesco de' Medici
8. Ludovico di Giovanni de' Medici
17. Caterina Sforza
4. Cosimo I de' Medici, Grand Duke of Tuscany
18. Jacopo Salviati
9. Maria Salviati
19. Lucrezia de' Medici
2. Ferdinando I de' Medici, Grand Duke of Tuscany
20. Fadrique Álvarez de Toledo y Enríquez de Guzmán
10. Pedro de Toledo y Zúñiga
21. Isabel de Zúñiga y Pimentel
5. Eleanor of Toledo
22. Luis Pimentel y Pacheco
11. María Osorio y Pimentel
23. Juana Osorio y Bazán
1. Claudia de' Medici
24. Anthony, Duke of Lorraine
12. Francis I, Duke of Lorraine
25. Renée of Bourbon
6. Charles III, Duke of Lorraine
26. Christian II of Denmark
13. Christina of Denmark
27. Isabella of Austria
3. Christina of Lorraine
28. Francis I of France
14. Henry II of France
29. Claude, Duchess of Brittany
7. Claude of Valois
30. Lorenzo de' Medici, Duke of Urbino
15. Catherine de' Medici
31. Madeleine de La Tour d'Auvergne

== Sources ==
- Bireley, Robert (2014). Ferdinand II, Counter-Reformation Emperor, 1578-1637. Cambridge University Press.
- Clough, Cecil H. (1981). The Duchy of Urbino in the Renaissance. Variorum Reprints.
- Crinò, Anna Maria (1976). "Un quadro incompiuto di Guido Reni". Mitteilungen des Kunsthistorischen Institutes in Florenz. 20. Bd., H. 3: 410–411.
- Polleross, Friedrich (2012). "Portraiture at the Imperial Court in the First Half of the 17th Century". In Evans, R.J.W.; Wilson, Peter H. (eds.). The Holy Roman Empire, 1495-1806: A European Perspective. Brill. pp. 349–366.
- Sandbichler, Veronika (2017). "Permanent places for festivals at the Habsburg court in Innsbruck: the 'comedy houses' of 1628 and 1654". In Mulryne, J.R.; De Jonge, Krista; Martens, Pieter; Morris, R.L.M. (eds.). Architectures of Festival in Early Modern Europe: Fashioning and Re-fashioning Urban and Courtly Space. Routledge. pp. 257–298.
- Sarti, Raffaella (2016). "Renaissance graffiti: the case of the Ducal Palace of Urbino". In Cavallo, Sandra; Evangelisti, Silvia (eds.). Domestic Institutional Interiors in Early Modern Europe. Routledge. pp. 51–82.
- Ward, A.W.; Prothero, G.W.; Leathes, Stanley, eds. (1911). The Cambridge Modern History. Vol. XIII. Cambridge at the University Press.
