= Duchy of Urbino =

Vassal of Papal States

Coordinates: 43°43′N 12°38′E

Duchy of Urbino Ducato di Urbino (Italian)
- 1443–1631
- Flag Coat of arms

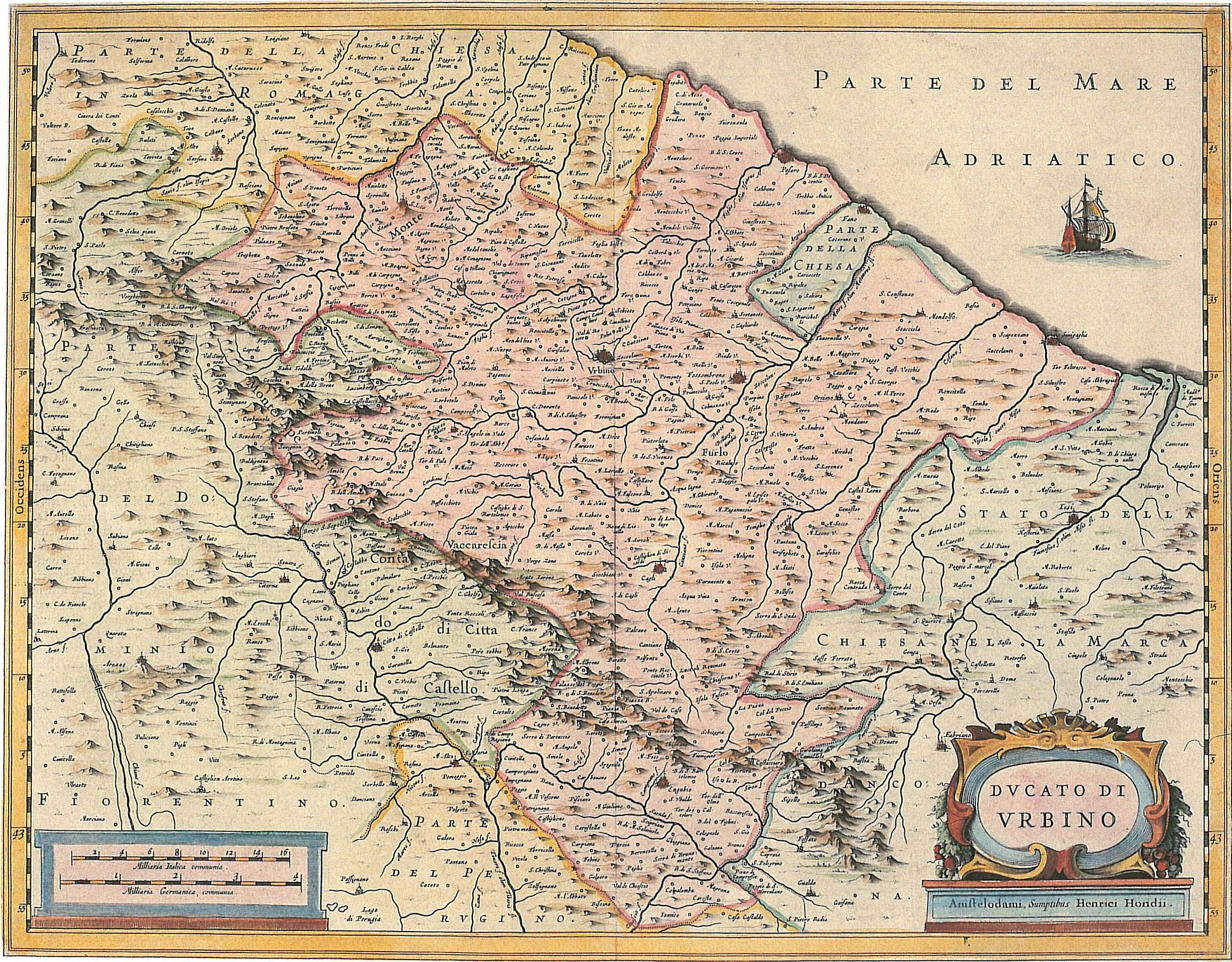
- The Duchy of Urbino in the 17th century
- Capital: Urbino (1443–1523); Pesaro (1523–1631)
- Official languages: Italian
- Religion: Roman Catholicism
- Government: Duchy
- Duke
  - 1443–1444: Oddantonio da Montefeltro (first)
  - 1623–1631: Francesco Maria II della Rovere (last)
- Historical era: Renaissance, Early modern period
  - Oddantonio da Montefeltro is elevated to duke by Pope Eugene IV: 1443
  - The duchy is annexed to the Papal States: 1631
Preceded by	Succeeded by
County of Urbino	Papal States
- Today part of: Italy

Banner of Arms of the Duchy of Urbino

The Duchy of Urbino (Italian: Ducato di Urbino) was an independent duchy in early modern central Italy, corresponding to the northern half of the modern region of Marche. It was directly annexed by the Papal States in 1631.

It was bordered by the Adriatic Sea in the east, the Republic of Florence in the west and the Papal States in the south. In 1523 the capital was moved from Urbino to Pesaro. After the short rule by Cesare Borgia in 1502–03, the dukedom went to the della Rovere papal family, who held it until 1625, when Pope Urban VIII annexed it to the Papal States as Legazione del Ducato di Urbino (later Legazione di Urbino).

== History ==
The papal nomination transformed the county of Urbino, established in 1213, into a duchy governed by the House of Montefeltro.

It was Pope Eugene IV, in 1443, who appointed Oddantonio da Montefeltro as the first Duke of Urbino (he was son of Guidantonio da Montefeltro, Count of Urbino and, as a life title, Duke of Spoleto). However, he reigned for less than a year, from 1443 to 1444, before being assassinated. His older half-brother Federico therefore took power, one of the greatest princes on the Italian scene of the time, famous both as a leader in battle and as a cultured patron of the arts. He alternated important military campaigns with a dazzling career as a statesman, also taking care of the erection of the Ducal Palace and protecting very famous artists at his court, such as Leon Battista Alberti, Piero della Francesca, Paolo Uccello, Pedro Berruguete, Luca della Robbia and Justus van Gent, in addition to the large group of architects and sculptors who embellished his palace.

Confirmed duke in 1474, he promoted the construction of numerous fortresses designed by Francesco di Giorgio Martini and assembled one of the most important libraries of the Renaissance. He married Battista Sforza in 1459 and ruled his duchy with solid authority until his death in 1482. During the rule of Federico the State reached its maximum territorial expansion and notable economic prosperity. Such was the importance of the Duchy that Urbino attracted or hosted in those times, among others, Piero della Francesca, Melozzo da Forlì, Luca Signorelli, Perugino, Giovanni Santi, Pinturicchio and Francesco di Giorgio Martini, as well as a young Bramante. From around 1480 the city of Gubbio became the second residence of the ducal family.

After a period of regency by Ottaviano Ubaldini della Carda, Guidobaldo da Montefeltro came to power, a promising but ill young man since his youth, who for this reason was unable to match his father's military career, despite taking part in some battles as a leader. He married Elisabetta Gonzaga and protected artists such as Raphael, Bramantino and Luca Signorelli. A famous literary monument at the court of him and his wife is Baldassare Castiglione's The Book of the Courtier. His reign was troubled by the struggles against the Papal States, in particular the conquests, which were never long-lasting, suffered by the nephews of the pontiffs, such as Cesare Borgia and Lorenzo de' Medici.

Guidobaldo died without children, but not before having adopted his sister Giovanna's firstborn, Francesco Maria I della Rovere, who became the fourth Duke of Urbino. Francesco Maria managed to take back Urbino from the Pope Leo X and was also able to expand the state with Senigallia and, above all, Pesaro, which was chosen as the new capital of the duchy in 1523. The city of Urbino suffered as a result, both economically and demographically, but the state continued to enjoy relative prosperity until the early 17th century. With his wife Eleonora Gonzaga, he dedicated himself to the construction of new sumptuous residences, including the Palazzo Ducale and the Villa Imperiale of Pesaro, and was the protector of artists such as Titian, Girolamo Genga, Raffaellino del Colle and Dosso Dossi.

In 1538 he was succeeded by his son Guidobaldo II della Rovere, fifth duke, who married twice, to Giulia da Varano and to Vittoria Farnese. Unlike his father, he loved to reside in the palace in Urbino, where he promoted the arrangement of the second floor. His ministers were Antonio Stati, count of Montebello and Pietro Bonarelli, count (later marquis) of Orciano, belonging to the noble Bonarelli family of Ancona. Among the artists he protected were Titian, Battista Franco Veneziano and Bartolommeo Genga.

In 1563 the Ecclesiastical province of the Archdiocese of Urbino was created, made up of the dioceses present in the Duchy, a particular case at the time since Urbino was the first archdiocese and the first ecclesiastical province erected within the Papal States, of which Urbino was a fiefdom, from its foundation in the 8th century; the only other case, not considering the "external" cities of Benevento and Avignon, was the province of the archdiocese of Ravenna founded at the time of the Roman Empire.

Upon the death of Guidobaldo II in 1574, he was succeeded by the sixth and last duke, his son Francesco Maria II della Rovere, a dark and grim personality, in the Spanish style, fascinating in his almost "friend" relationships with Torquato Tasso and Federico Barocci. Worried by the problem of the heir, he finally had Federico Ubaldo in 1606. The young man married Claudia de' Medici and had time to have a daughter, Vittoria, before dying under mysterious circumstances in 1623, before becoming duke.

The old Francesco Maria II thus bowed to fate and worked, in his last years, to favor the devolution of his State to the Roman Curia, signing an act as early as 1625. Upon his death, in 1631, Pope Urban VIII decreed the devolution of the Duchy to the Papal States, asserting both the feudal rights that the Holy See boasted over the Duchy and the will of the last duke. However, all the movable things of the family remained the personal property of Francesco's daughter, Vittoria, who, upon marrying the Grand Duke of Tuscany Ferdinando II de' Medici, brought the extraordinary collections of paintings, jewels and various objects with her to Florence.

Immediately after the incorporation of the Duchy, the Legation of Urbino was established which, in the eighteenth century, gave its name to the papal province of the same name.

== Statistics ==
In 1610, a contemporary estimate printed by the Elzevirs gave the duchy's annual income as over 200,000 scudi, and the duke's fortune at St. Leo as 2,000,000 scudi. In 1624, Mercurius Gallicus estimated the revenue of the duchy at 300,000 scudi. In regards to population, Zane estimated 150,000 for the duchy at the start of the 17th century, and the military at 10,000 fighting men, half of whom were soldiers and the other half militia. Three-fourths of the duchy's military force was available for foreign service. In 1591, the military force of the duchy amounted to 13,313 fighting men, of whom 8,300 carried arquebuses and 3,783 wore marions. A contemporary census places the duchy's population in 1598 at 115,121. The last legation census before the dissolution of the duchy gave the population as 220,000 in an area of 5,556 square kilometers (giving nearly 40 people per square kilometer), with Urbino (the urban area) having 12,000 (7,500 in the city proper, 4,500 in the adjacent district).

In 1574, few to none of the nobility had annual revenues of more than 3,000 scudi, but many burgesses made 300–400 scudi annually. The few merchants were chiefly from outside the duchy. A few years after the loss of the duchy's independence, the papacy drew 100,000 scudi annually from direct and fiscal taxation. The militia at the time number 8,000 infantry and 500 cavalry, plus the garrison of Sinigaglia.

== List of rulers of Urbino ==
Lords until 1213, counts thereafter until 1443, thereafter dukes.

Name	Birth	Reign	Death	Consort
Antonio I da Montefeltro			c. 1184	
Montefeltrano I da Montefeltro		c. 1184	1202	
Bonconte da Montefeltro		1226	1241/1242	
Montefeltrano II da Montefeltro		1242	1255	
Guido I da Montefeltro	1223	1255	29 September 1298	
Papal control		1285	1296	
Federico I da Montefeltro		1296	1322	
Papal control		1322	1324	
Guido II da Montefeltro		1324	1360	
Galasso da Montefeltro		1324	1360	
Nolfo da Montefeltro	c. 1290	1324	1364	
Federico II da Montefeltro		1364–1370?	1370?	Teodora Gonzaga
Antonio II da Montefeltro	1348	1363–1404	29 April 1404	Agnesina dei Prefetti di Vico
Guidantonio da Montefeltro	1377	1403–1443	February 1443	Ringarda Malatesta; Caterina Colonna
Oddantonio da Montefeltro created Duke	1428	1443–1444	22 July 1444	Isotta d'Este
Federico III da Montefeltro	7 June 1422	1444–1482	10 September 1482	Gentile Brancaleoni; Battista Sforza
Guidobaldo da Montefeltro	17 January 1472	1482–1502	10 April 1508	Elisabetta Gonzaga
Cesare Borgia	13 September 1475	1502–1503		Charlotte of Albret, Lady of Châlus
Guidobaldo da Montefeltro	17 January 1472	1503–1508	10 April 1508	Elisabetta Gonzaga
Francesco Maria I della Rovere	22 March 1490	1508–1516	20 October 1538	Eleonora Gonzaga
Lorenzo II de' Medici	12 September 1492	1516–1519	4 May 1519	Madeleine de la Tour d'Auvergne
Francesco Maria I della Rovere	22 March 1490	1521–1538	20 October 1538	Eleonora Gonzaga
Guidobaldo II della Rovere	2 April 1514	1538–1574	28 September 1574	Giulia da Varano; Vittoria Farnese
Francesco Maria II della Rovere	20 February 1549	1574–1621	23 April 1631	Lucrezia d'Este; Livia della Rovere
Federico Ubaldo della Rovere	16 May 1605	1621–1623	28 June 1623	Claudia de' Medici
Francesco Maria II della Rovere	20 February 1549	1623–1625	23 April 1631	Livia della Rovere

== See also ==
- History of Urbino
- Pesaro
- List of historic states of Italy
- Renaissance in Urbino
