= Federico Ubaldo della Rovere =

Duke of Urbino (1621–1623)

Federico Ubaldo
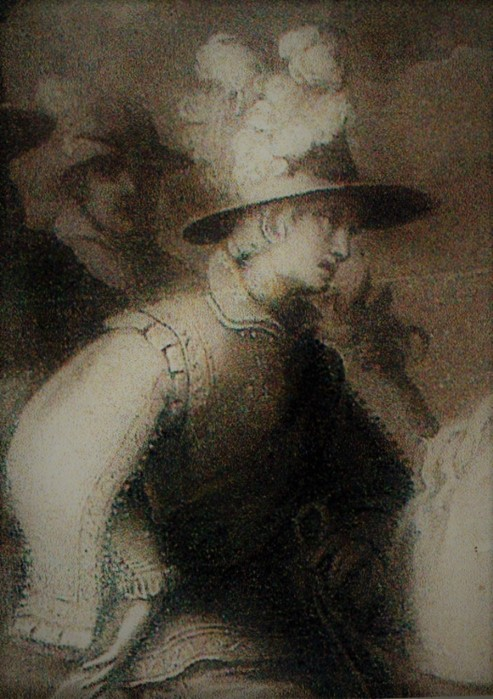
- della Rovere in 1621

Duke of Urbino
- Tenure: 3 November 1621 – 28 June 1623
- Predecessor: Francesco Maria II
- Successor: Francesco Maria II
- Born: 16 May 1605; Ducal Palace of Pesaro, Duchy of Urbino
- Died: 28 June 1623 (aged 18); Ducal Palace of Pesaro, Urbino
- Spouse: Claudia de' Medici
- Issue: Vittoria, Grand Duchess of Tuscany
Names
- Federico Ubaldo della Rovere
- Father: Francesco Maria II della Rovere
- Mother: Livia della Rovere

Federico Ubaldo della Rovere (16 May 1605 – 28 June 1623) was Duke of Urbino from 1621 to 1623. He was father of Vittoria della Rovere, Grand Duchess of Tuscany.

== Biography ==
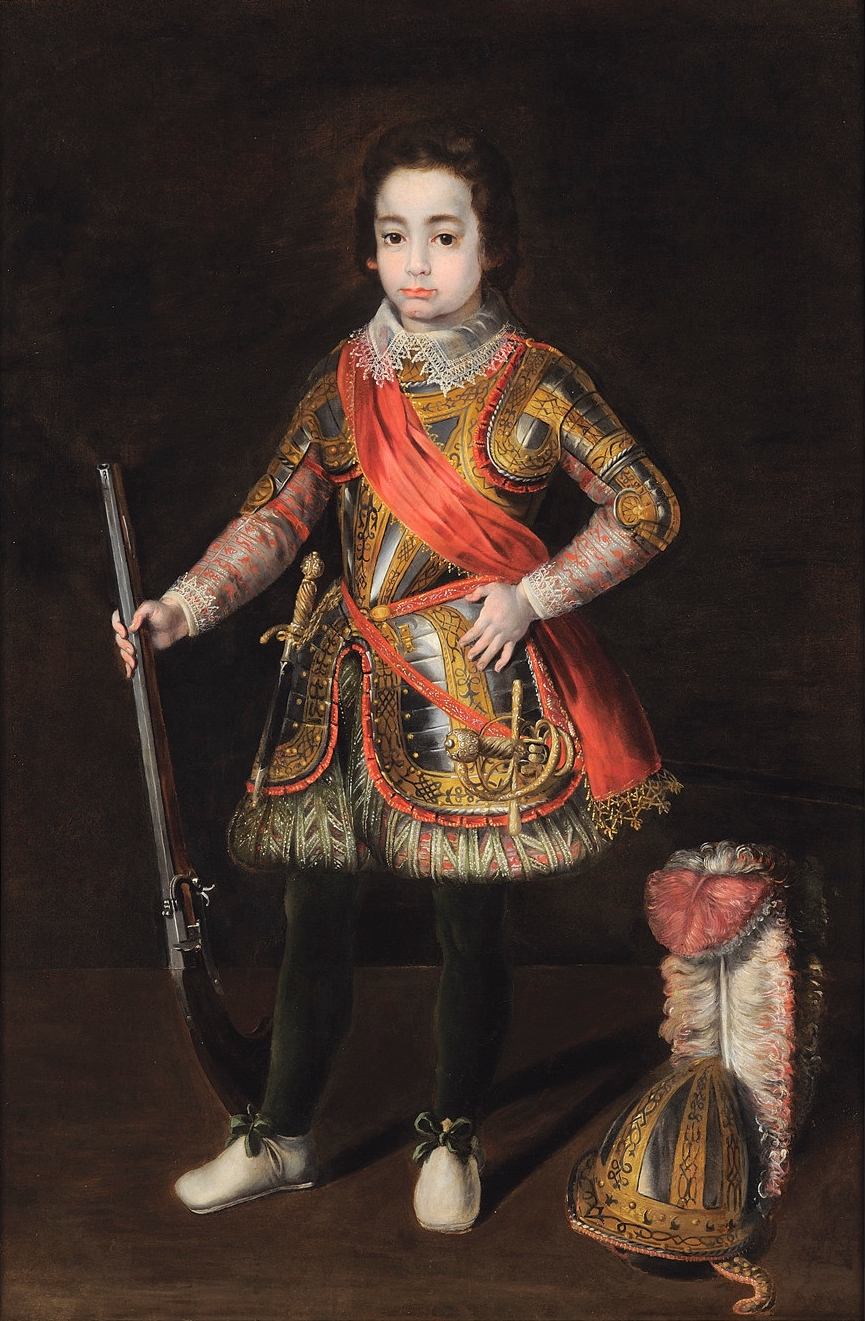
Aged 5, c. 1610

His father Francesco Maria II della Rovere was popularly urged to remarry after the death of his first wife in 1598, with the marriage producing no heirs. In 1599, he married his cousin Livia della Rovere, granddaughter of Giulio della Rovere, with Federico Ubaldo being the product of said marriage.

At the age of 16 he succeeded to the Duchy of Urbino on 3 November 1621. This same year, in order to produce an heir himself, he married Claudia de' Medici, daughter of Ferdinando I de' Medici, Grand Duke of Tuscany and Christina of Lorraine. The following year, Claudia gave birth to a daughter Vittoria della Rovere.

He was to be in the fold of enlightened absolutism upheld since Francesco Maria I della Rovere. In 1623, Federico died in Urbino. He was likely poisoned, but autopsy results claim that he died with an epileptic seizure. The funeral took place on the following Sunday, 2 July, and was accompanied by the whole clergy. The confraternity and 125 high noblemen, all dressed in mourning, with a torch in their hands, the funeral procession went through the city, in front of the whole population of the city of Urbino. His father decided to allow his state to be subsumed into the Papal States. In 1626, Claudia de' Medici married Leopold V, Archduke of Austria. Their daughter married the Grand Duke of Tuscany in 1633 but her bloodline died out in 1743.

== Issue ==
1. Vittoria della Rovere (7 February 1622 – 5 March 1694) married Ferdinando II de' Medici, Grand Duke of Tuscany and had issue.

== Sources ==
Bibliography

- Verstegen, Ian F. (22 February 2007). Patronage and Dynasty: The Rise of the della Rovere in Renaissance Italy (eBook ed.). Penn State University Press. ISBN 9780271091105 – via De Gruyter.
