= Vittoria della Rovere =

Grand Duchess of Tuscany from 1637 to 1670

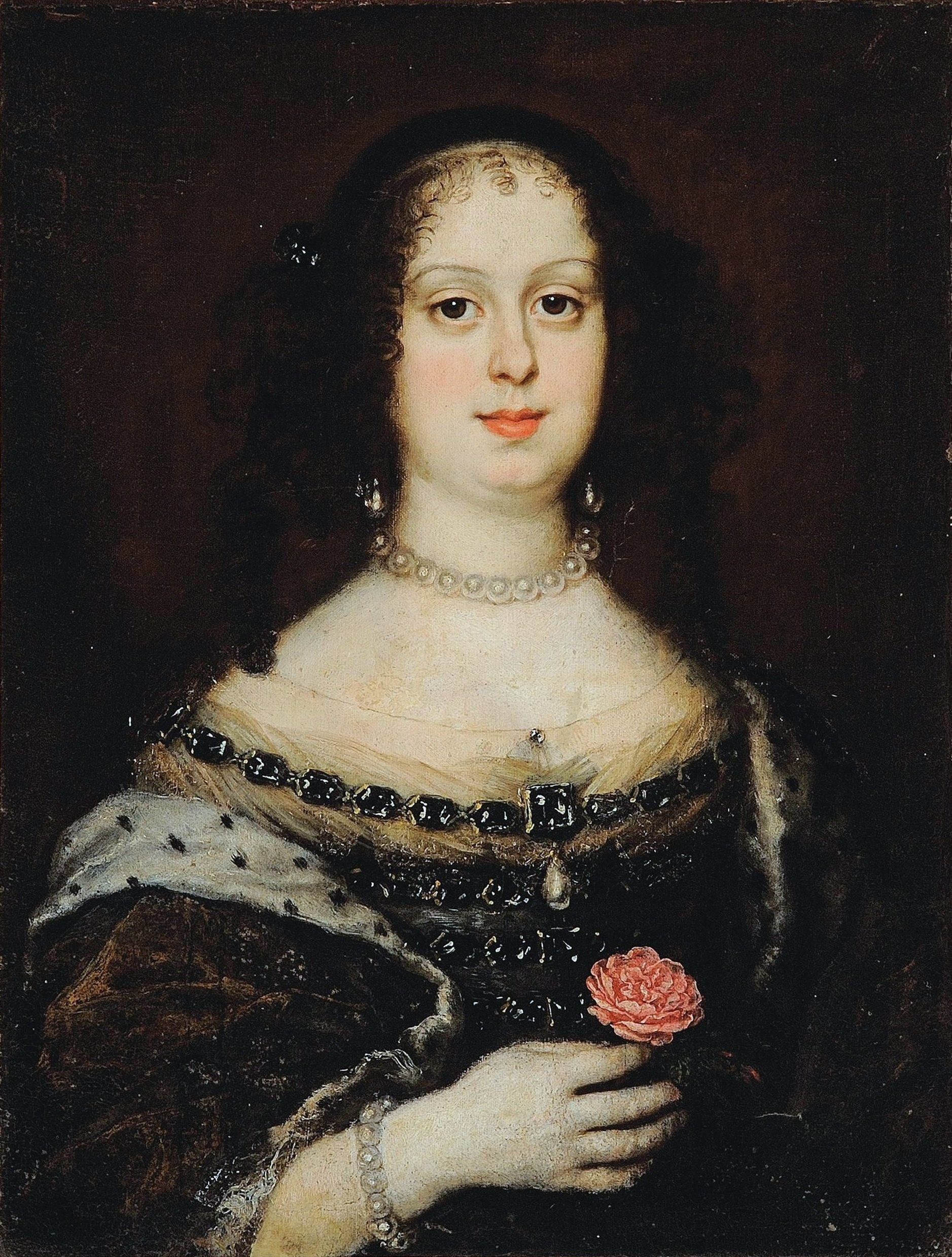
- Portrait by Justus Sustermans, c. 1640-1645

Grand Duchess consort of Tuscany
- Tenure: 6 April 1637 – 23 May 1670
- Born: 7 February 1622; Ducal Palace of Pesaro, Urbino
- Died: 5 March 1694 (aged 72); Ducal Palace of Pisa, Tuscany
- Spouse: Ferdinando II de' Medici (m. 1634; died 1670)
- Issue: Cosimo III, Grand Duke of Tuscany; Francesco Maria, Duke of Rovere
Names
- Vittoria della Rovere
- House: Della Rovere (by birth); Medici (by marriage)
- Father: Federico Ubaldo della Rovere
- Mother: Claudia de' Medici

Vittoria della Rovere (7 February 1622 – 5 March 1694) was Grand Duchess of Tuscany as the wife of Grand Duke Ferdinando II. She had four children with her husband, two of whom would survive infancy: the future Cosimo III, Tuscany's longest-reigning monarch, and Francesco Maria, a prince of the Church. At the death of her grandfather Francesco Maria della Rovere, she inherited the Duchies of Rovere and Montefeltro, which reverted to her second son, Francesco Maria, at her death. She was later entrusted with the care of her three grandchildren. Her marriage brought a wealth of treasures to the House of Medici, which can today be seen in the Palazzo Pitti and the Uffizi Gallery in Florence.

== Infancy ==
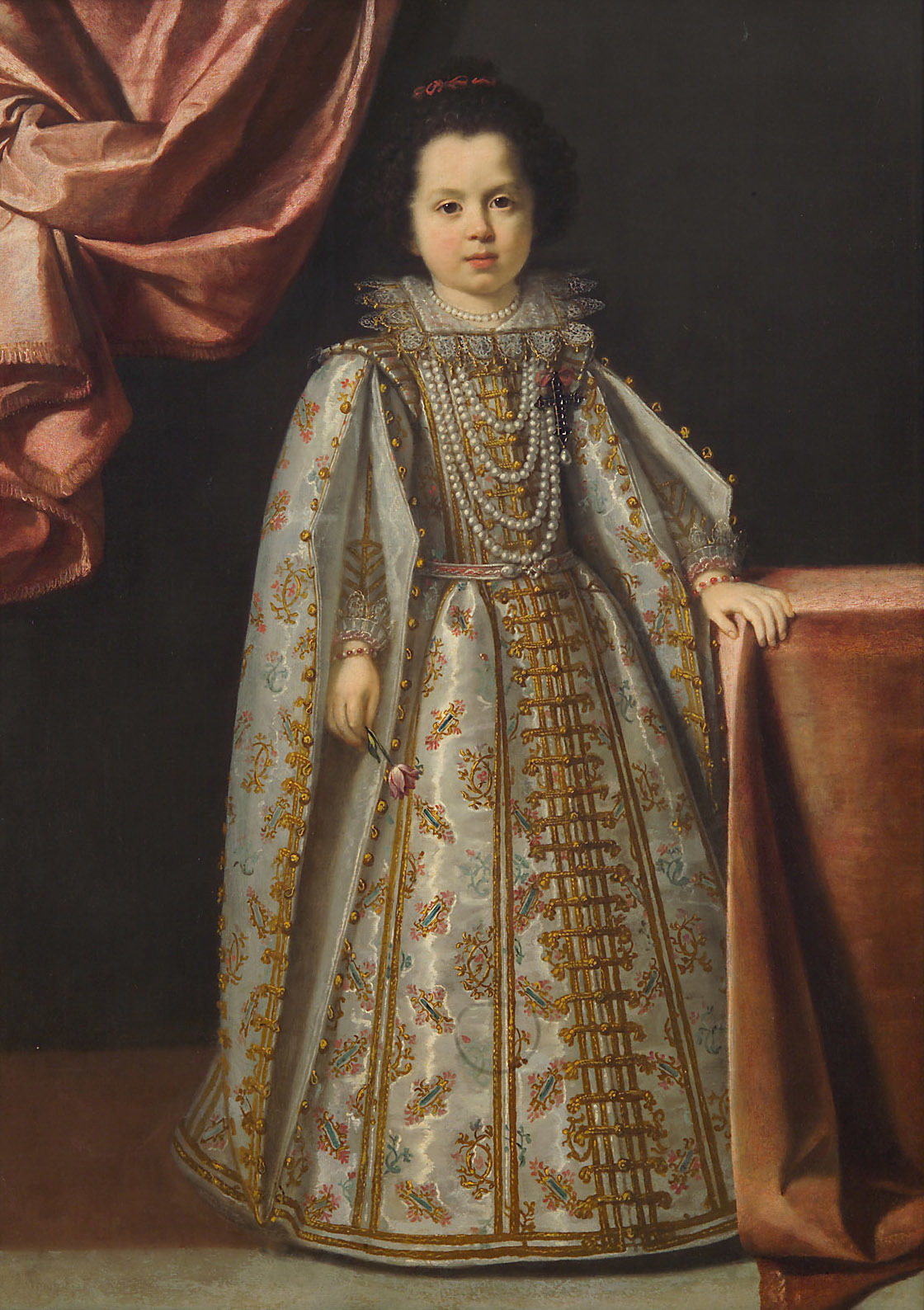
Portrait of a young Vittoria della Rovere by Lorenzo Lippi, c. 1626-1628

Vittoria della Rovere was the only child of Federico Ubaldo della Rovere, son of the then incumbent Duke of Urbino, Francesco Maria. Her mother was Claudia de' Medici, a sister of Cosimo II de' Medici, Grand Duke of Tuscany and the Duchess of Mantua. As an infant it was expected that she would inherit her grandfather's Duchy of Urbino, but Pope Urban VIII convinced Francesco Maria to resign it to the Papacy. The duchy was eventually annexed to the Papal States by Pope Urban VIII. Instead, she received the Rovere allodial possessions, the Duchies of Rovere and Montefeltro, and art collection which became her property in 1631 aged nine.

At the age of one, Vittoria was betrothed to her Medici first cousin Ferdinando II, Grand Duke of Tuscany. Under the influence of her Medici mother, she was sent to Florence to be brought up at the Tuscan court. The marriage was arranged by the Grand Duke's grandmother, Christina of Lorraine, who had been acting as joint regent with her daughter-in-law Maria Maddalena of Austria since 1621. Despite Ferdinando II reaching his majority in 1628, Dowager Grand Duchess Christina remained the power behind the throne till her demise in 1636.

== Grand Duchess of Tuscany ==
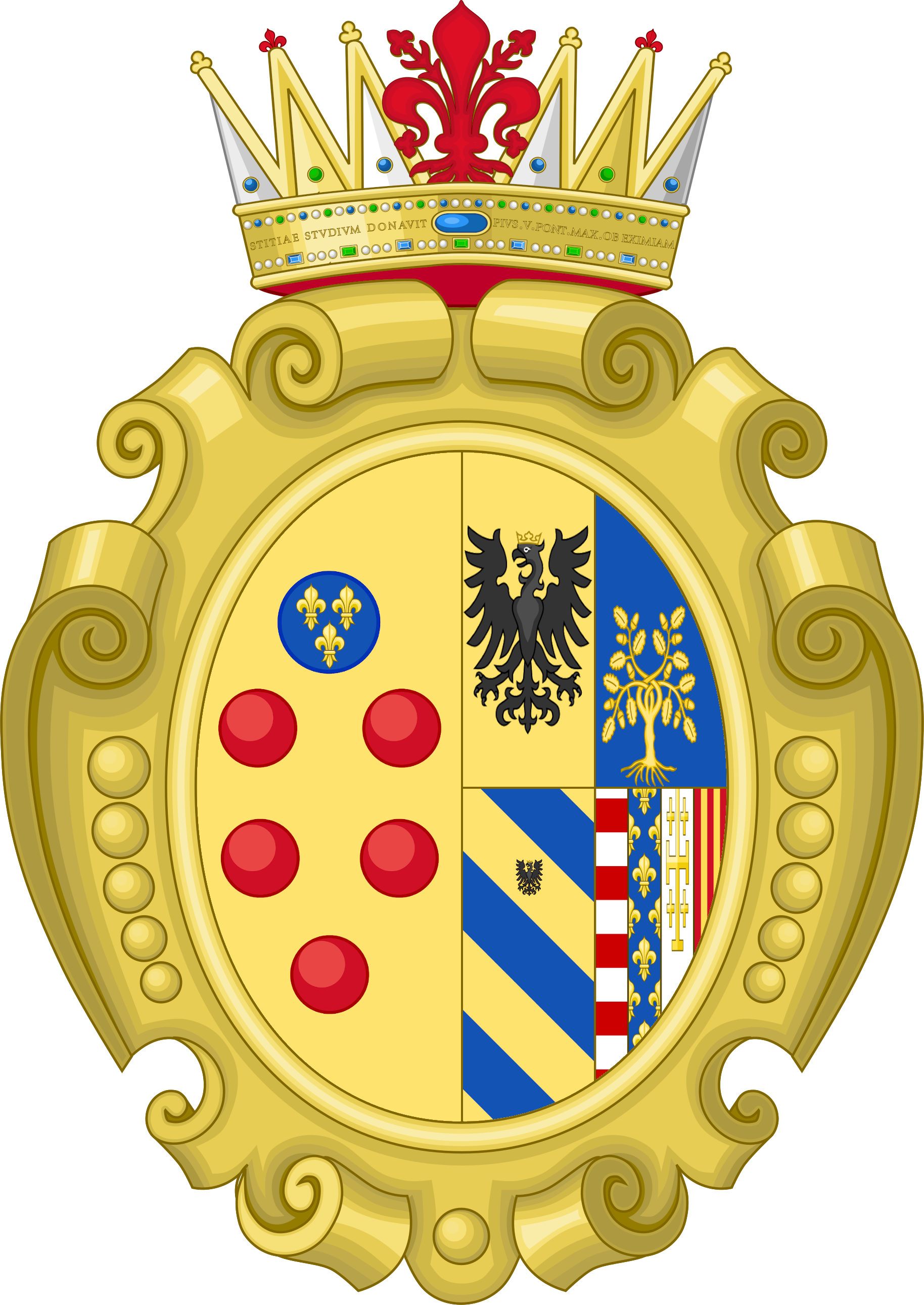
Arms of Vittoria della Rovere as Grand Duchess of Tuscany

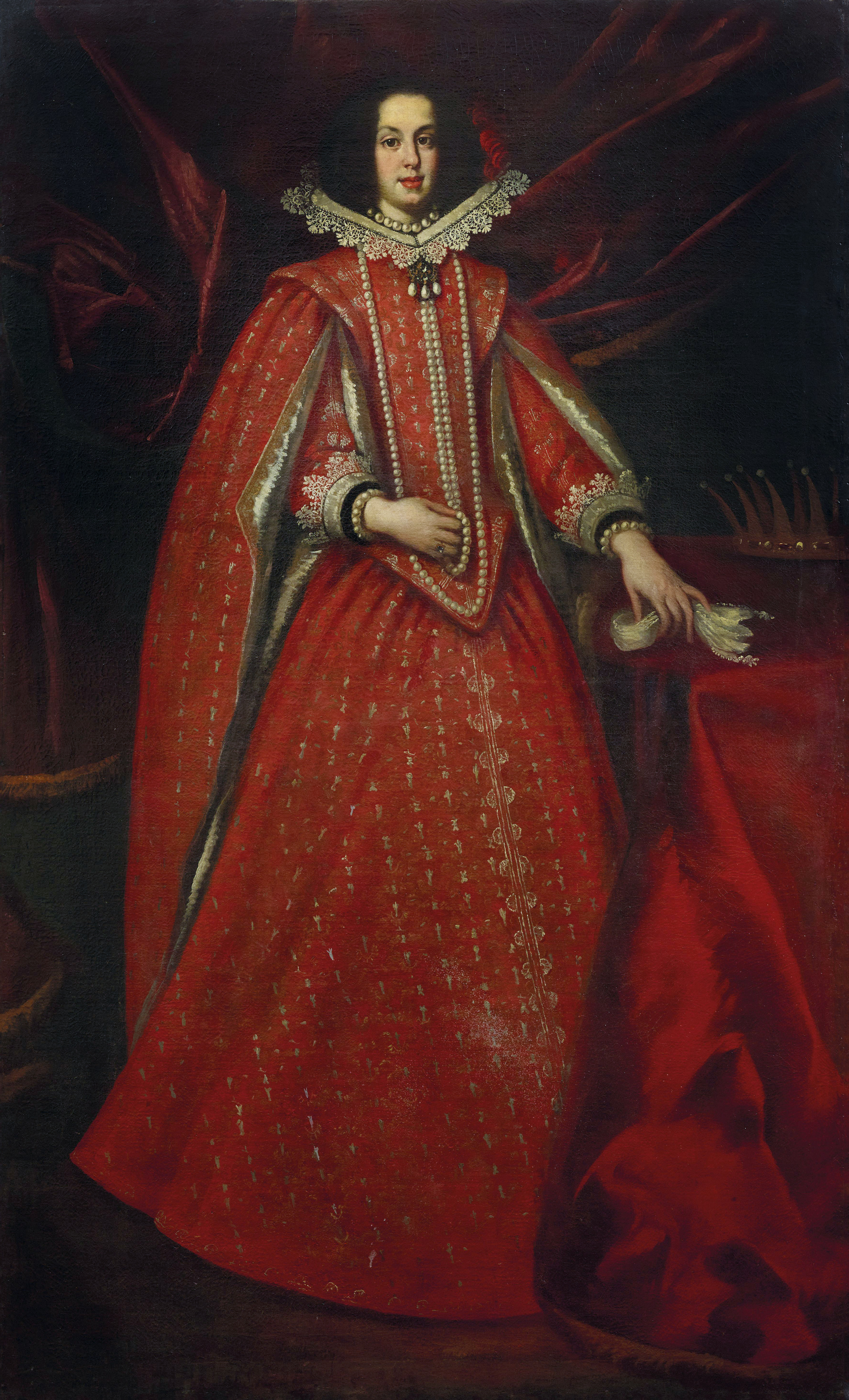
Vittoria in red dress overlooking the grand ducal crown by Sustermans, c. 1637–40

On 2 August 1634 she privately married Ferdinando, while the official public marriage was celebrated on 6 April 1637. Vittoria was crowned on the next 5 July. Her inheritance was included in her dowry which was offered to the Medici. These rich art collections of the family, now in the Uffizi and Palazzo Pitti, thus became the property of the Grand Duchy of Tuscany. Brought up in the convent of Crocetta, Vittoria's education was a deeply religious one administered by the Dowager Grand Duchesses who had aligned Tuscany with the Papal States. Her education caused her to be ruled by priests in later life much to the annoyance of her liberal husband.

The marriage was consummated six years after the marriage ceremony and Vittoria gave birth to a son who died at the age of two days. Another son followed in 1640 but died at birth. Finally in 1642 the couple had another son named Cosimo III de' Medici who was styled the Grand Prince of Tuscany. Under the influence of their mother, her children also received a deeply Roman Catholic education, and arguments between the Grand Ducal couple were sparked when there was a disagreement about the education of the Grand Prince. Shortly after the birth of Cosimo, the couple became estranged: Vittoria caught her husband and a page, Count Bruto della Molera, in bed together. The incident initially caused Vittoria to refuse to speak to her husband. When she decided to try to come to terms with him, however, he declined to be reconciled, and it was almost twenty years before their quarrel was properly made up. They briefly reconciled in 1659, which resulted in the birth of their last child, Prince Francesco Maria, in 1660. The estranged couple had, at best, an unhappy marriage, and lived separately by mutual agreement for many years.

Ferdinando II died in 1670 and was thus succeeded by the then Grand Prince as Cosimo III. He had been married to Marguerite Louise d'Orléans, first cousin of Louis XIV of France, in 1661. A son, Prince Ferdinando, and a daughter, Princess Anna Maria Luisa, were born within four years, and weeks after the accession of Cosimo III, Marguerite Louise was pregnant again. Vittoria della Rovere and her haughty daughter-in-law vied with each other for power. Thanks to her influence over her son, it was Vittoria who triumphed. Cosimo III went so far as to assign his mother the day-to-day administration of Tuscany. As a result, Vittoria was formally admitted into the Grand Duke's Consulta, or "Privy Council", leaving an embittered Marguerite Louise to her own devices. The two Grand Duchesses frequently quarrelled over precedence and the Consulta, but Cosimo III always took his mother's side, which only fuelled the ever-growing rages of Orléans. Orléans was left to the supervision of her son, the Grand Prince Ferdinando. By early 1671, fighting between Marguerite Louise and Vittoria became so heated that a contemporary remarked that "the Pitti Palace has become the devil's own abode, and from morn till midnight only the noise of wrangling and abuse could be heard".

Vittoria employed Caterina Angiola Pieroncini as a lady-in-waiting, sending her to Paris in 1664 for training in needlework.

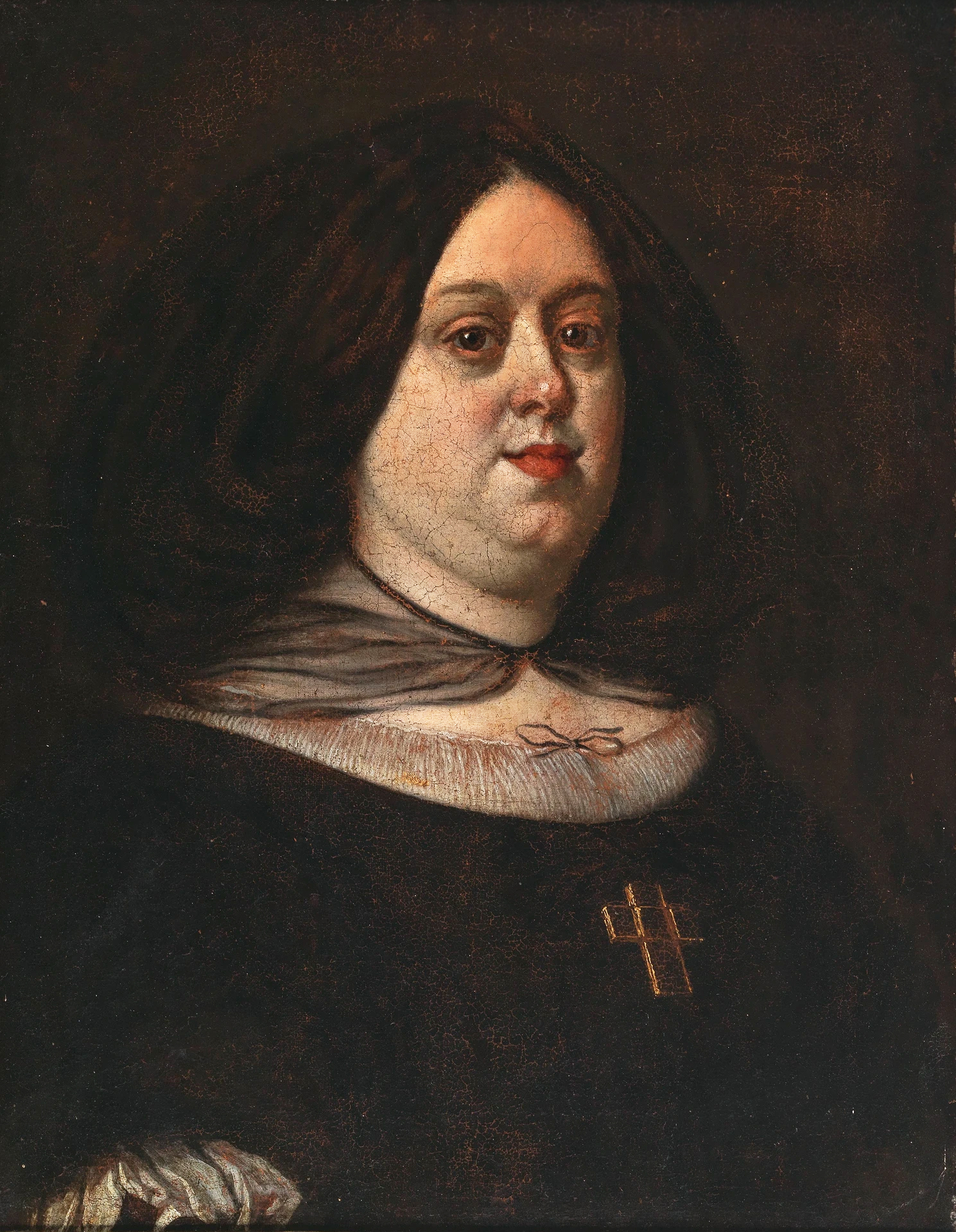
Portrait in widow's dress (portrait after Carlo Dolci)

Vittoria triumphed when news of her daughter-in-law's pending departure to France came in 1674. The younger grand duchess had lived in virtual imprisonment at the Medici Villa in Poggio a Caiano outside Florence for sometime. Eventually, the Grand Ducal couple decided to separate on the condition that Orléans stay at the Abbey Saint Pierre de Montmartre in Paris. Orléans left Tuscany in 1675 never to return. As a result of the abandonment of her children, Vittoria della Rovere was made guardian of her grandchildren: Grand Prince Ferdinando, Princess Anna Maria Luisa and Prince Gian Gastone.

Retiring from politics, in her old age, she made long stays in the convent of the Montalve, known as Villa La Quiete, as well as in the Villa del Poggio Imperiale, to which she transferred some of the art collection she had inherited. Vittoria della Rovere, Grand Duchess of Tuscany, died in Pisa in 1694 at the age of seventy-two. She was buried at the Basilica of San Lorenzo, Florence. At her death her son Francesco Maria, Cardinal since 1686, inherited the Rovere duchies. The titles became extinct with the extinction of the House of Medici with the death of her grandson Gian Gastone de' Medici, Grand Duke of Tuscany in 1737. Her only granddaughter Electress Palatine Anna Maria Luisa willed the contents of the Medici properties to the Tuscan state in 1743. The so-called Family Pact ensured that Medicean art and treasures spanning over nearly three centuries would remain in Florence along with what was once Vittoria's inheritance.

== Issue ==
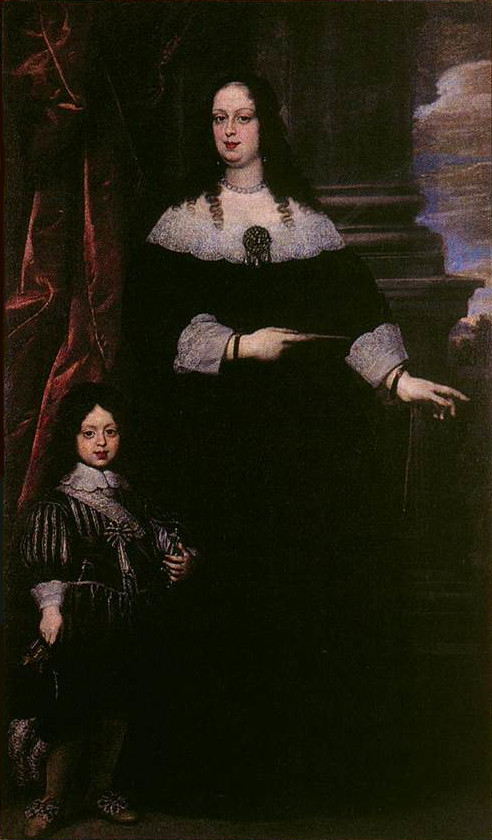
Grand Duchess Vittoria and her eldest son Cosimo painted by Sustermans, 1645-1646

1. Cosimo de' Medici, Grand Prince of Tuscany (19 December 1639 - 21 December 1639), died in infancy.
2. A nameless daughter who died at birth (1640)
3. Cosimo III de' Medici, Grand Duke of Tuscany (14 August 1642 – 31 October 1723), married Marguerite Louise d'Orléans and had issue.
4. Francesco Maria de' Medici (12 November 1660 – 3 February 1711), married Eleonora Luisa Gonzaga. No issue.

== Ancestry ==
Ancestors of Vittoria della Rovere

8. Guidobaldo II della Rovere, Duke of Urbino
4. Francesco Maria della Rovere, Duke of Urbino
9. Vittoria Farnese
2. Federico Ubaldo della Rovere, Duke of Urbino
10. Ippolito della Rovere, Marchese di San Lorenzo
5. Livia della Rovere
11. Isabella Vitelli, Marchesa dell'Amatrice
1. Vittoria della Rovere
12. Cosimo I de' Medici, Grand Duke of Tuscany
6. Ferdinando I de' Medici, Grand Duke of Tuscany
13. Eleonora di Toledo
3. Claudia de' Medici
14. Charles III, Duke of Lorraine
7. Christina of Lorraine
15. Princess Claude of France

== Bibliography ==
- Adelinda Modesti: Women's Patronage and Gendered Cultural Networks in Early Modern Europe: Vittoria della Rovere, Grand Duchess of Tuscany (Englische Edition), 2019, E-Book, print edition 298 pages, publisher: Taylor and Francis, ISBN 978-1-351-77811-4.

== See also ==
Caterina Angiola Pieroncini, lacemaker for Vittoria della Rovere, and one of her ladies in waiting

== Citations ==
Vittoria della Rovere House of della Rovere Born: 7 February 1622 Died: 5 March 1694
Italian nobility
Preceded by Francesco Maria II della Rovere	Duke of Rovere and Montefeltro; 1631–1694	Succeeded by Francesco Maria de' Medici
Italian royalty
Vacant Title last held by Maria Maddalena of Austria	Grand Duchess consort of Tuscany; 1637–1670	Succeeded by Marguerite Louise d'Orléans
