= Francesco Maria II della Rovere =

Last Duke of Urbino (1549–1631)

Francesco Maria II
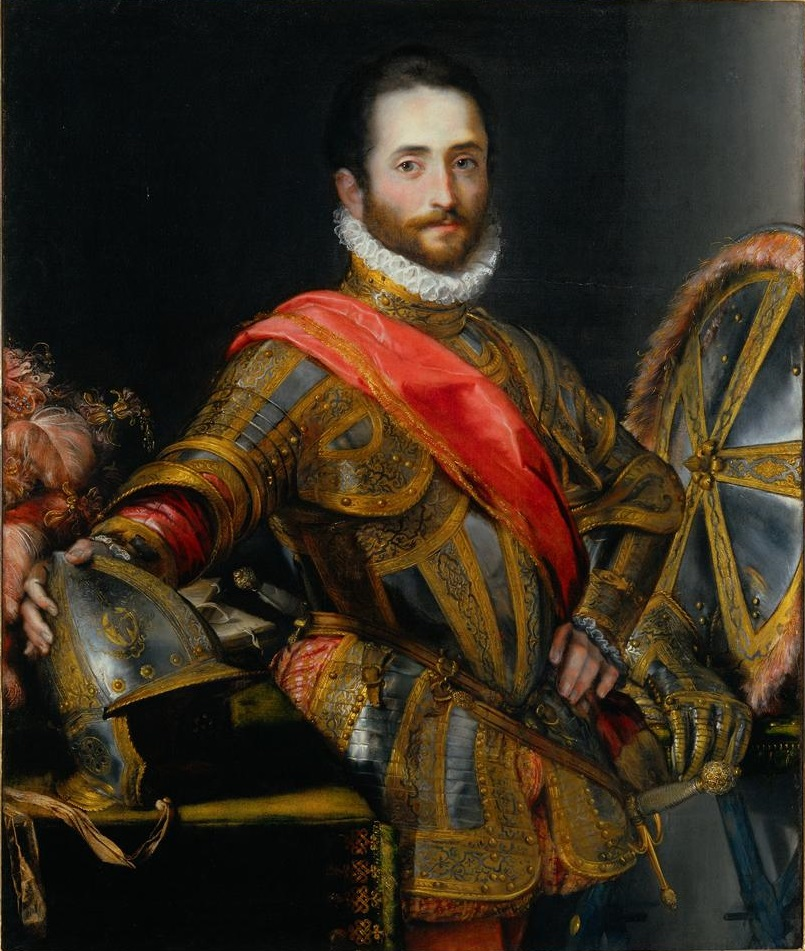
- Francesco Maria II della Rovere, by Federico Barocci (1572)

Duke of Urbino Lord of Pesaro
- First reign: 28 September 1574 – 3 November 1621
- Predecessor: Guidobaldo II
- Successor: Federico Ubaldo
- Second reign: 28 June 1623 – 23 April 1631
- Predecessor: Federico Ubaldo
- Successor: None (Urbino was ceded to the Papal States)
- Born: 20 February 1549; Pesaro, Duchy of Urbino
- Died: 23 April 1631 (aged 82); Casteldurante, Duchy of Urbino
- Spouse: Lucrezia d'Este (m. 1570; died 1598) Livia della Rovere (m. 1599)
- Issue: Federico
Names
- Francesco Maria II Montefeltro Della Rovere D’Aragona
- House: Della Rovere
- Father: Guidobaldo II
- Mother: Vittoria Farnese

Francesco Maria II della Rovere (20 February 1549 – 23 April 1631) was the last Duke of Urbino.

== Biography ==
Born at Pesaro, Francesco Maria was the son of Guidobaldo II della Rovere, Duke of Urbino, Count of Montefeltro and Vittoria Farnese, Princess of Parma. He was raised between 1565 and 1568 at the Royal court of Philip II of Spain. While there he met a Spanish girl and informed his father of his intention to marry her. But his father would not allow it and demanded he return to Urbino. In 1570, Francesco Maria married Lucrezia d'Este, a daughter of Ercole II d'Este. His father died only a few years later, in 1574, and Francesco Maria succeeded his father as Duke of Urbino.

By 1580, the family estate was in crisis and Francesco Maria was forced to sell his family's titles – the Duchy of Sora and Arce – for 100,000 scudi to Giacomo Boncompagni.

Francesco Maria's marriage, though, remained childless and Francesco Maria needed a male heir. Without one, his family's remaining titles would lapse on his death and his entire estate would be acquired, by default, by the Papal States.

So in 1599, after the death of first wife Lucrezia, he married his cousin Livia della Rovere, 36 years his junior. (Note: Daughter of the illegitimate son of his Cardinal uncle, Giulio Feltrio della Rovere.) On 16 May, 1605, their long-expected and only child Federico Ubaldo was born.

Federico Ubaldo married Claudia de' Medici in 1621 and was made Duke by his father. However, Federico died in 1623 from an epileptic attack, leaving only a daughter, Vittoria Della Rovere, wife of Ferdinando II de' Medici, Grand Duke of Tuscany; their child was Cosimo III de' Medici, Grand Duke of Tuscany; none of Cosimo III's children had heirs.

The aging Francesco Maria took up the title of Duke again, but as there was no more hope for a male heir, he gave his Duchy to Pope Urban VIII in 1625. The Pope's nephew Taddeo Barberini took control of the duchy which was annexed to the Papal States after Francesco's death at Urbania in 1631. The last member of the della Rovere family, Vittoria, inherited the Duke's art collection and had it transferred to Florence to the Uffizi Gallery.

== Marriages ==
1. Lucrezia d'Este on 19 January 1570, daughter of Ercole II d'Este, Duke of Ferrara and Renée of France.
2. Livia della Rovere on 29 April 1599, daughter of Ippolito della Rovere and Isabella Vitelli dei Signori dell'Amatrice.

== Issue ==
1. Federico Ubaldo della Rovere (16 May 1605 – 28 June 1623) son of Livia della Rovere, was Duke of Urbino and the father of Vittoria della Rovere.

== Gallery ==
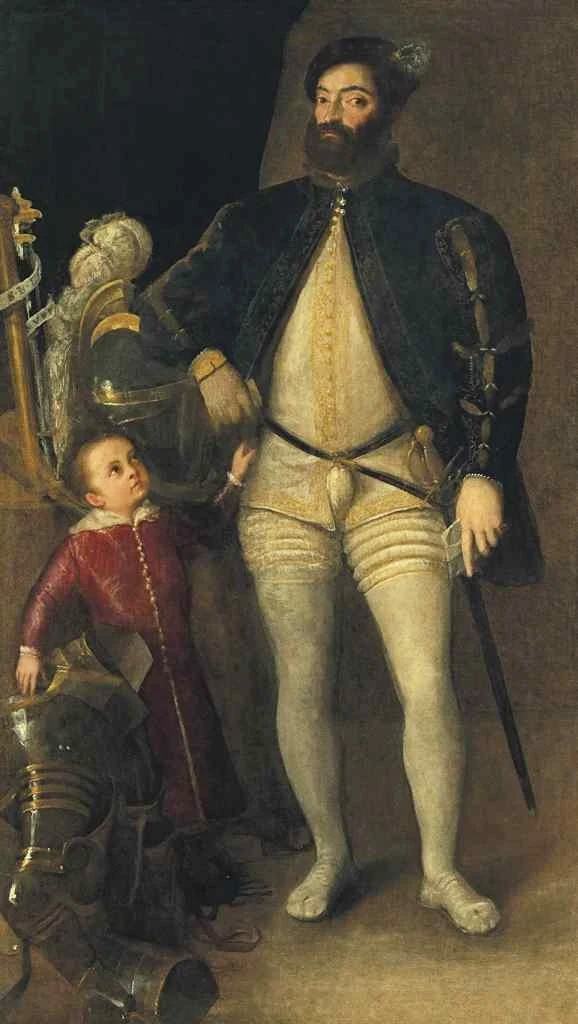
Francesco Maria with his father Guidobaldo II

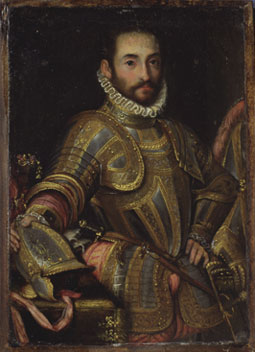
Francesco Maria II, portrait by Federico Barocci

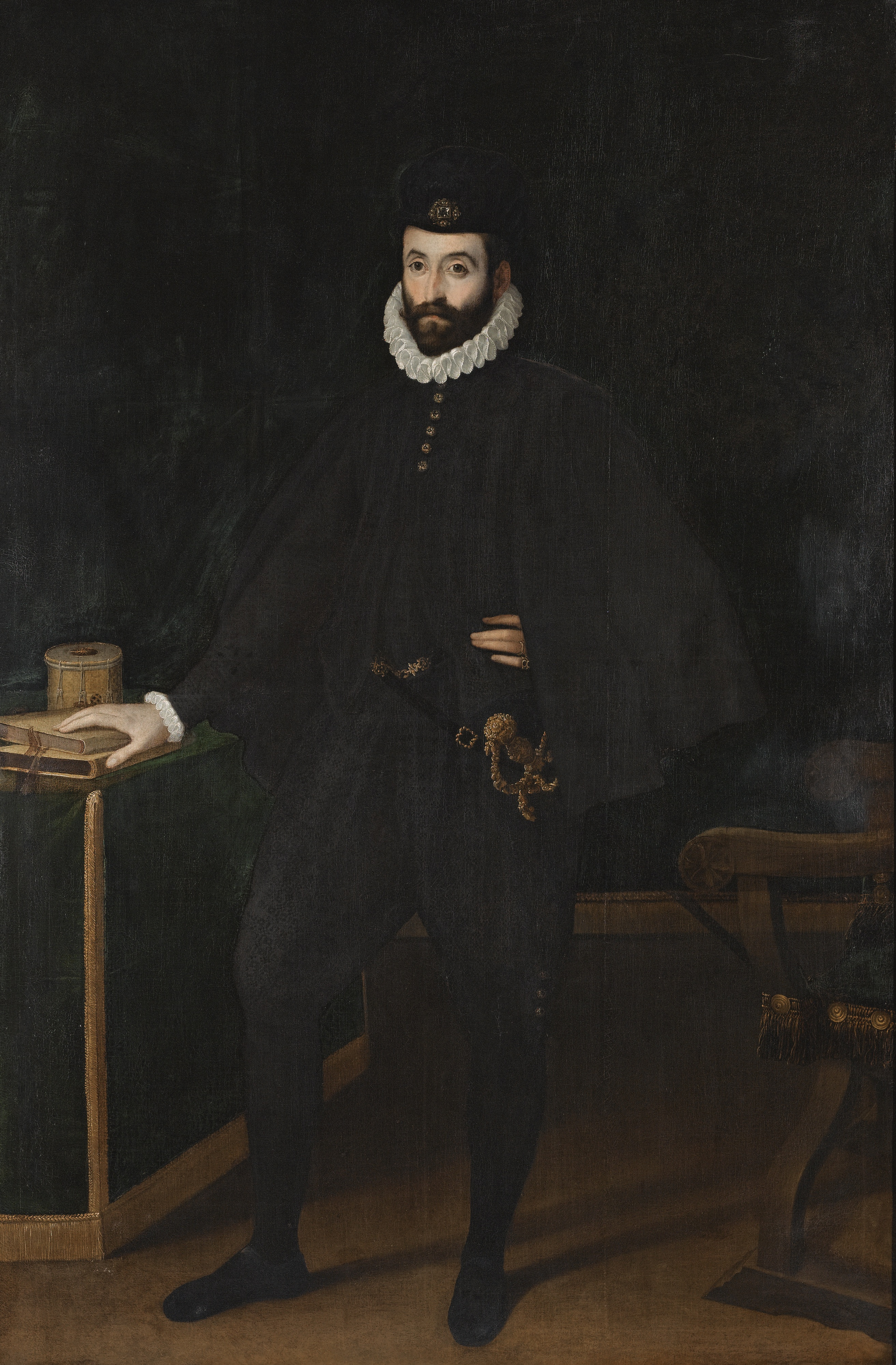
Francesco Maria II, portrait by Federico Barocci (workshop)

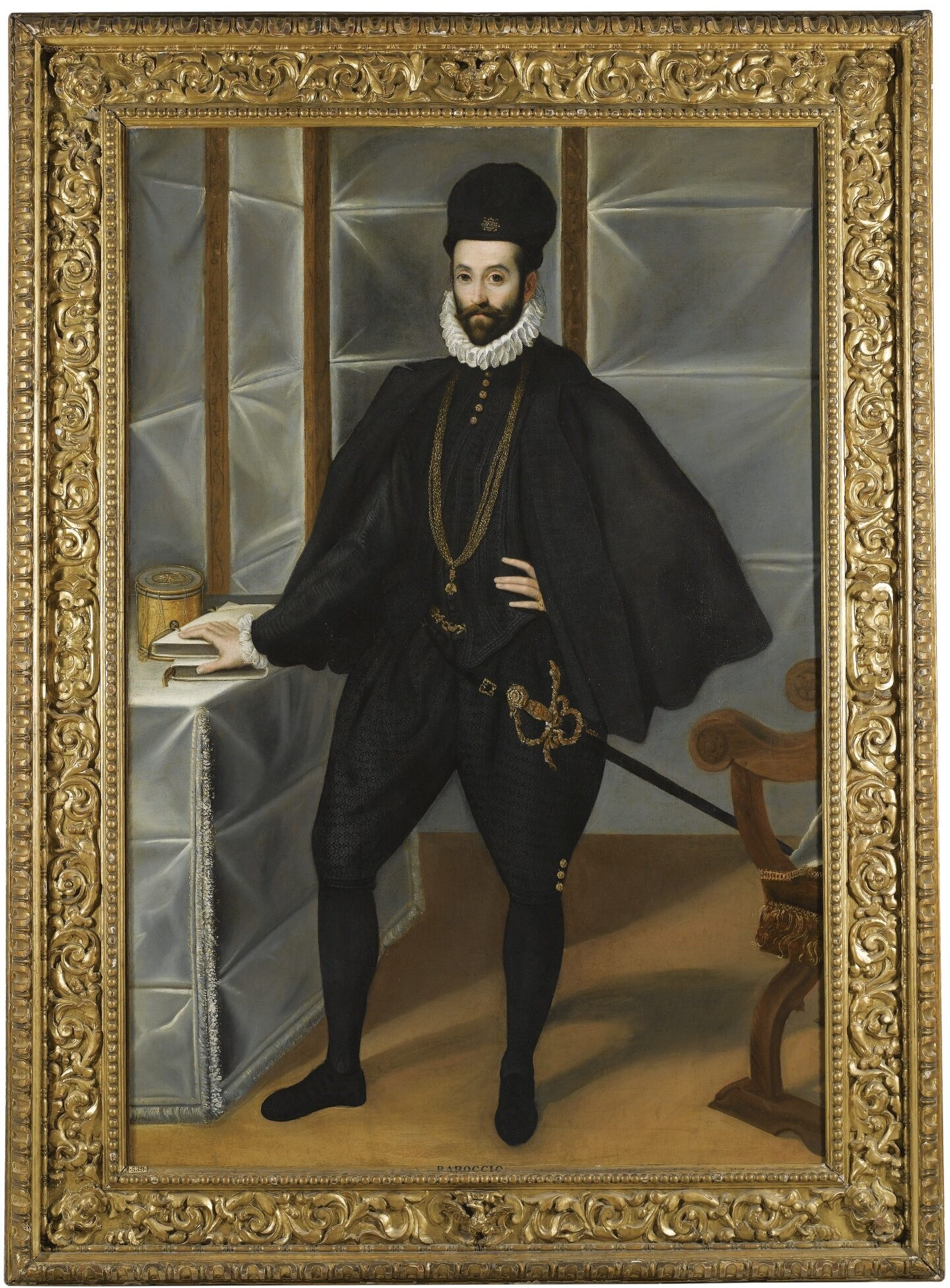
Francesco Maria II, portrait by Federico Barocci (workshop), 1585 circa

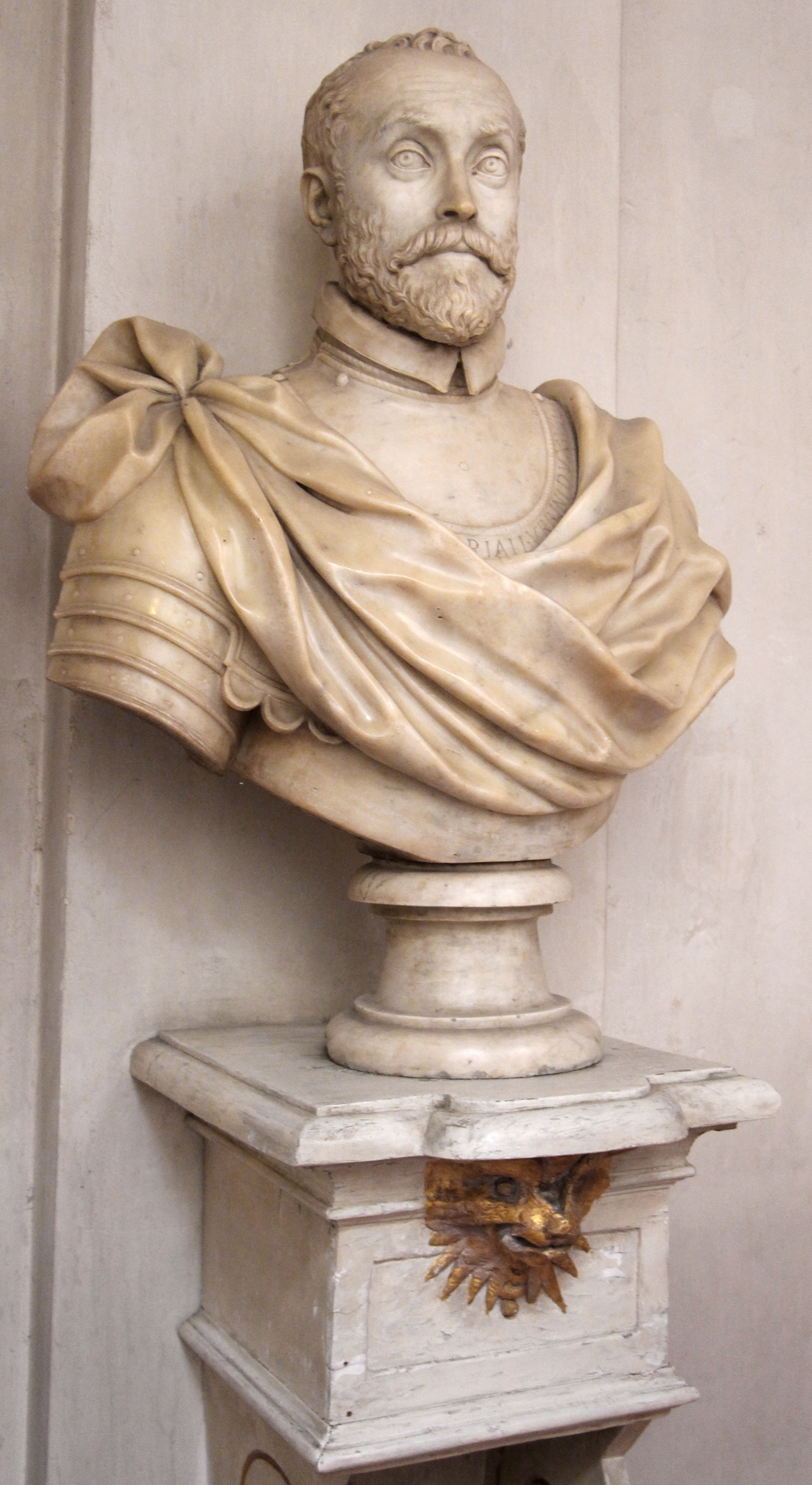
Bust of Francesco Maria II by Giovanni Bandini

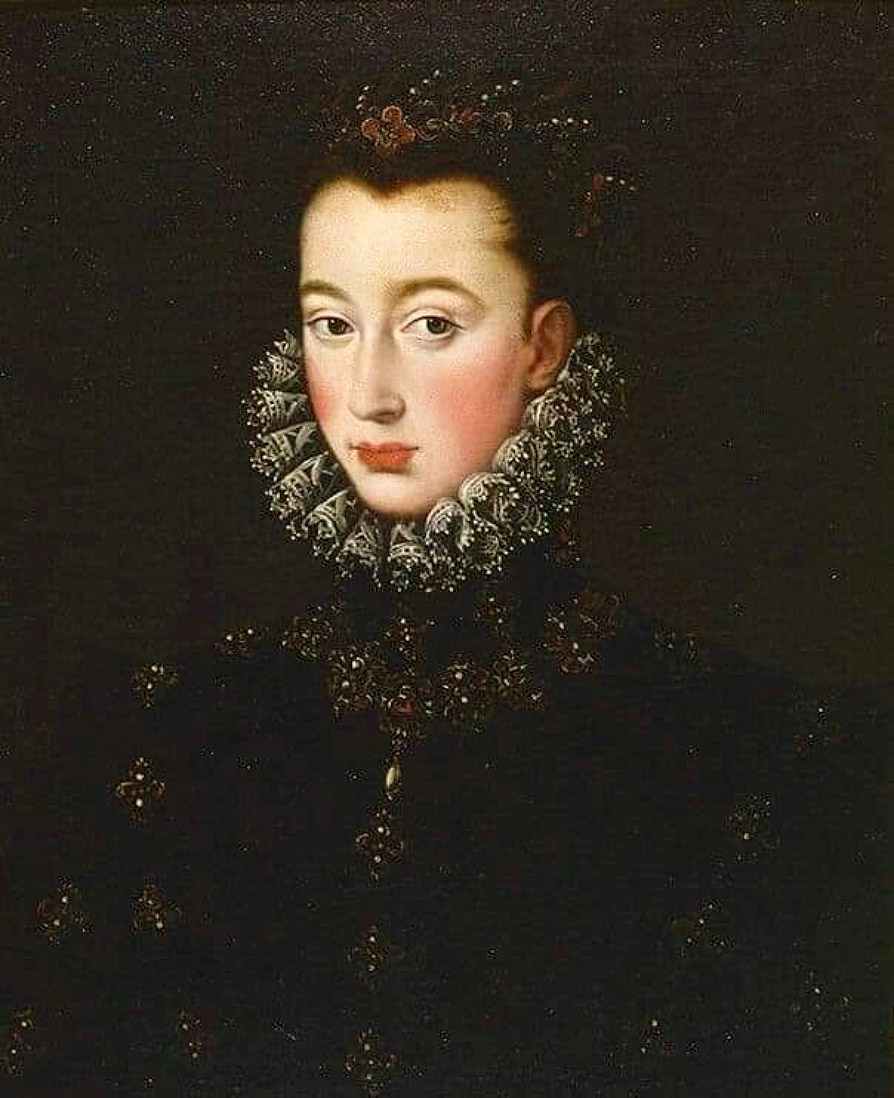
Lucrezia d'Este, 1st wife

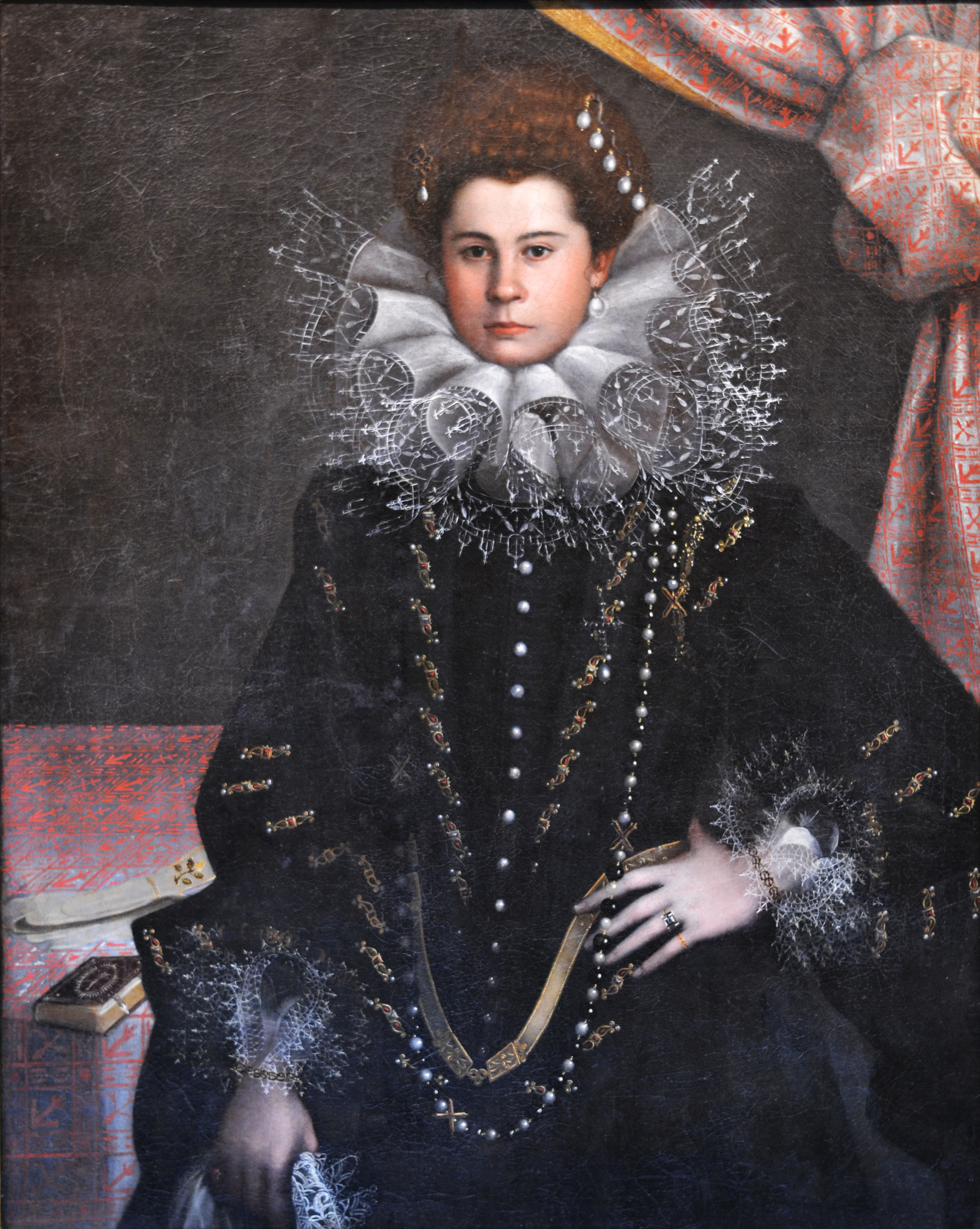
Livia della Rovere, 2nd wife

Preceded by Guidobaldo II della Rovere	Duke of Urbino; 1574–1625	Extinct
Preceded by Guidobaldo II della Rovere	Duke of Sora; 1574–1580	Succeeded by Giacomo Boncompagni
