= Della Rovere =

Noble family of Italy

- Country: Duchy of Urbino
- Origin: Savona, Republic of Genoa
- Founded: fifteenth century
- Founder: Leonardo Beltramo della Rovere
- Final head: Vittoria della Rovere, died 1694
- Titles: Duke of Urbino; Duke of Sora; Lord of Pesaro; Lord of Senigallia
- Motto: Audentes Fortuna iuvat
- Estates: Palazzo Ducale, Urbino; Palazzo Della Rovere, Rome

The Della Rovere (pronounced [della ˈroːvere]; literally "of the oak tree") were a powerful noble family at the time of the Italian Renaissance. The family had humble origins in Savona, in Liguria, and acquired power and influence through nepotism and ambitious marriages arranged by two Della Rovere popes: Francesco Della Rovere, who ruled as Sixtus IV from 1471 to 1484; and his nephew Giuliano, who became Julius II in 1503. Sixtus IV built the Sistine Chapel, which is named after him. Julius II was a patron of Michelangelo, Raphael and other Renaissance artists, and initiated the demolition and rebuilding of St. Peter's Basilica. Also the Basilica of San Pietro in Vincoli in Rome was the family church of the Della Rovere. Members of the family were influential in the Church of Rome, and as dukes of Urbino, dukes of Sora and lords of Senigallia; the title of Urbino was extinguished with the death of Francesco Maria II in 1631, and the family died out with the death of his granddaughter Vittoria, Grand Duchess of Tuscany.

== History ==
Francesco Della Rovere was born into a poor family in Liguria in north-west Italy in 1414, the son of Leonardo della Rovere of Savona. A Franciscan who became Minister General of his order, then cardinal, he had a reputation for unworldliness until he was elected pope in 1471. As Sixtus IV he was both wealthy and powerful, and at once set about giving power and wealth to his nephews of the Della Rovere and Riario families. Within months of his election, he had made Giuliano della Rovere (the future pope Julius II) and Pietro Riario both cardinals and bishops; four other nephews were also made cardinals. He made Giovanni Della Rovere, who was not a priest, prefect of Rome, and arranged for him to marry into the da Montefeltro family, dukes of Urbino. Sixtus claimed descent from a noble Della Rovere family, the counts of Vinovo in Piemonte, and adopted their coat-of-arms.

Guidobaldo da Montefeltro adopted Francesco Maria I della Rovere, his sister's child and nephew of Pope Julius II. Guidobaldo I, who was heirless, called Francesco Maria at his court, and named him as heir of the Duchy of Urbino in 1504, this through the intercession of Julius II. In 1508, Francesco Maria inherited the duchy thereby starting the line of Rovere Dukes of Urbino. That dynasty ended in 1626 when Pope Urban VIII incorporated Urbino into the papal dominions.

Vittoria, last descendant of the della Rovere family (she was the only child of Federico Ubaldo), married Ferdinando II de' Medici, Grand Duke of Tuscany. They had two children: Cosimo III, Tuscany's longest reigning monarch, and Francesco Maria de' Medici, a prince of the Church.

== Lineage ==
- Leonardo Beltramo di Savona della Rovere (died 1430)
  - Francesco della Rovere (1414–1484)
  - Raffaello della Rovere (1423–1477)
    - Giuliano della Rovere (1443–1513)
      - Felice della Rovere (c. 1483–1536)
    - Giovanni della Rovere (1457–1501)
      - Francesco Maria I della Rovere (1490–1538)
        - Guidobaldo II della Rovere (1514–1574)
          - Virginia della Rovere (1544–1571)
          - Francesco Maria II della Rovere (1549–1631)
            - Federico Ubaldo della Rovere (1605–1623)
              - Vittoria della Rovere (1622–1694)
          - Isabella Feltria della Rovere (1552–1619)
          - Lavinia Feltria della Rovere (1558–1632)
        - Ippolita della Rovere (1515–1561)
        - Elisabetta della Rovere (1529–1561)
        - Giulia della Rovere (1531–1563)
        - Giulio della Rovere (1533–1578)
          - Ippolito della Rovere (1554–1620)
            - Livia della Rovere (1585–1641)
    - Bartolomeo della Rovere (1447–1496)
    - Luchina della Rovere (1451–1515)

== Della Rovere Dukes of Urbino (1508) ==
1. Francesco Maria I della Rovere (1490–1538)
2. Guidobaldo II della Rovere (1514–1574)
3. Francesco Maria II della Rovere (1549–1631) - duchy abolished, title continued
4. Federico Ubaldo della Rovere (1605–1623) - title became extinct with his death.

== Other people with the same surname ==
Among the many people who did not belong to this family, but bore the same name, are:

- the Della Rovere family, counts of Vinovo, among them:
  - Domenico della Rovere of Vinovo, cardinal, who built the Castello Della Rovere there
  - his brother Cristoforo della Rovere of Vinovo

and various artists, including:

- the brothers Giovan Battista Della Rovere and Giovan Mauro Della Rovere, both known as "il Fiamminghino"
- an unrelated Lombard family of painters and illuminators active in the seventeenth century.

== Gallery ==
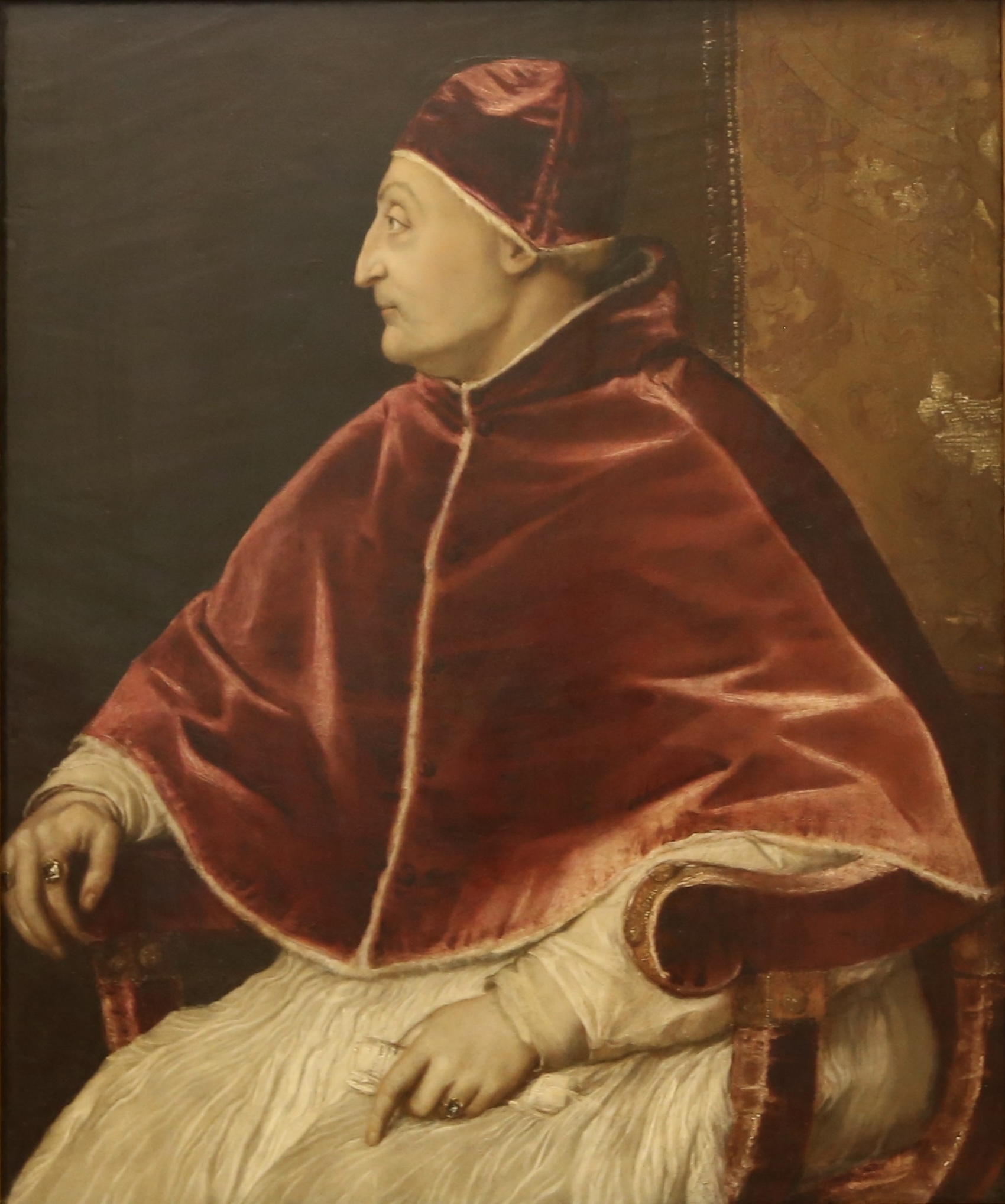
Francesco della Rovere, later Sixtus IV

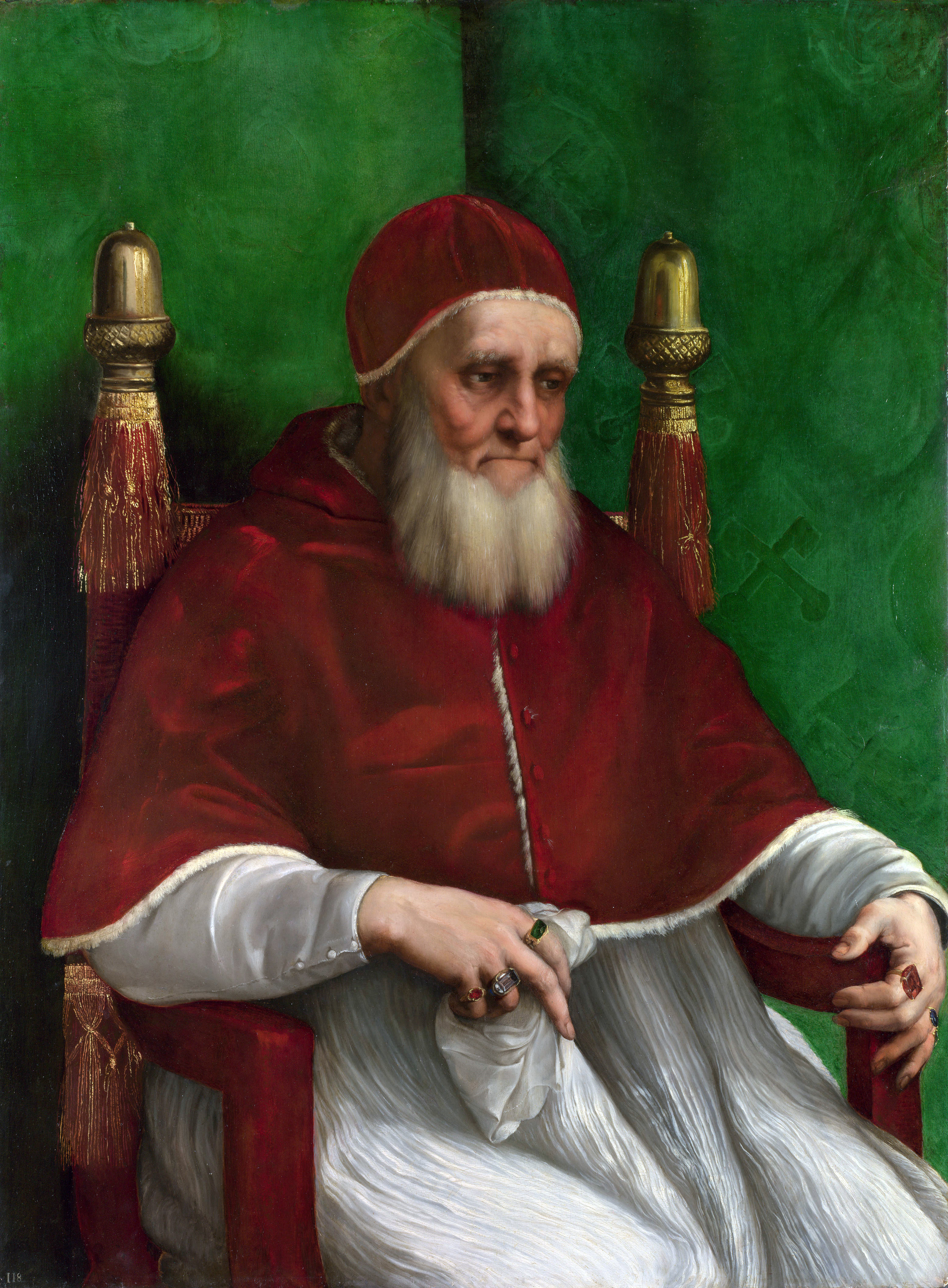
Giuliano della Rovere, later Julius II

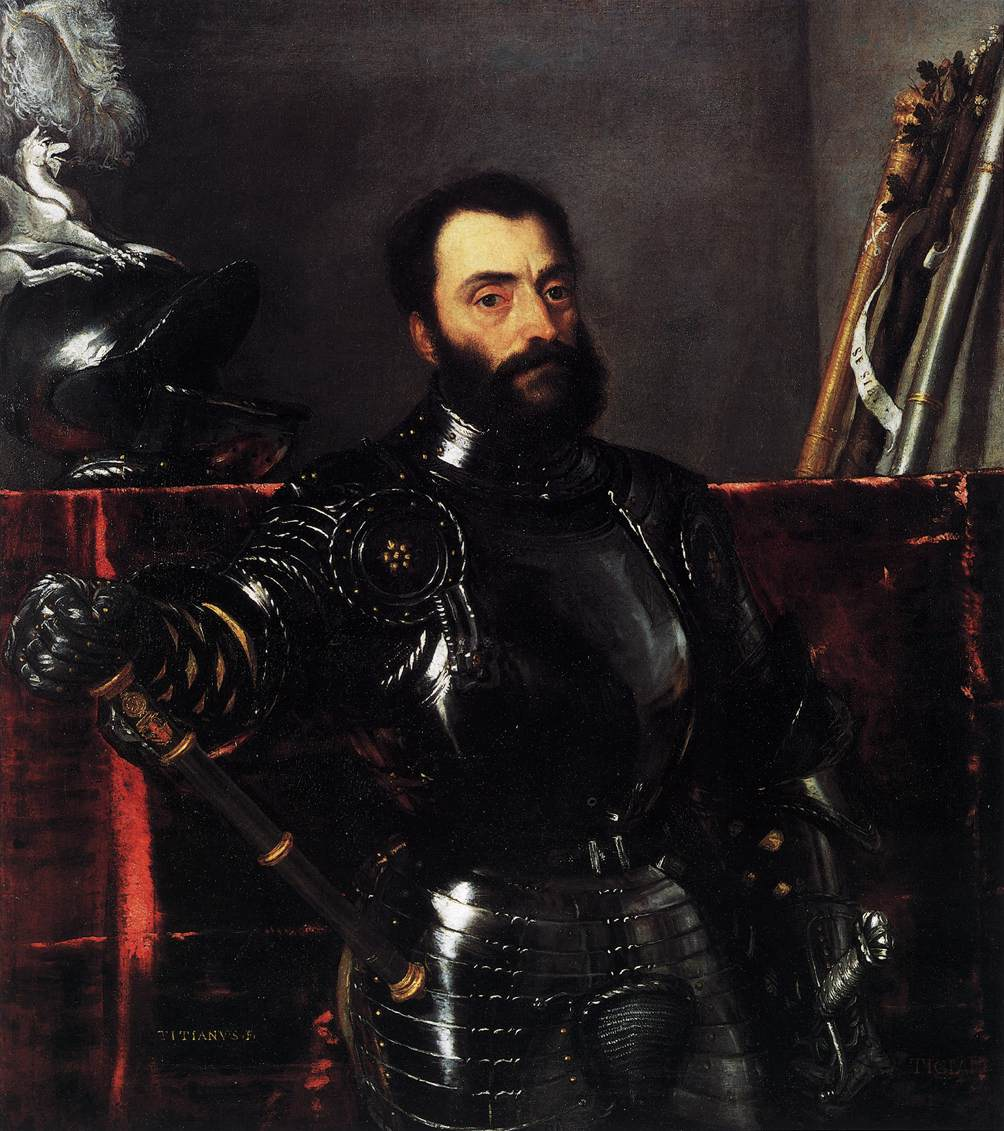
Francesco Maria I della Rovere

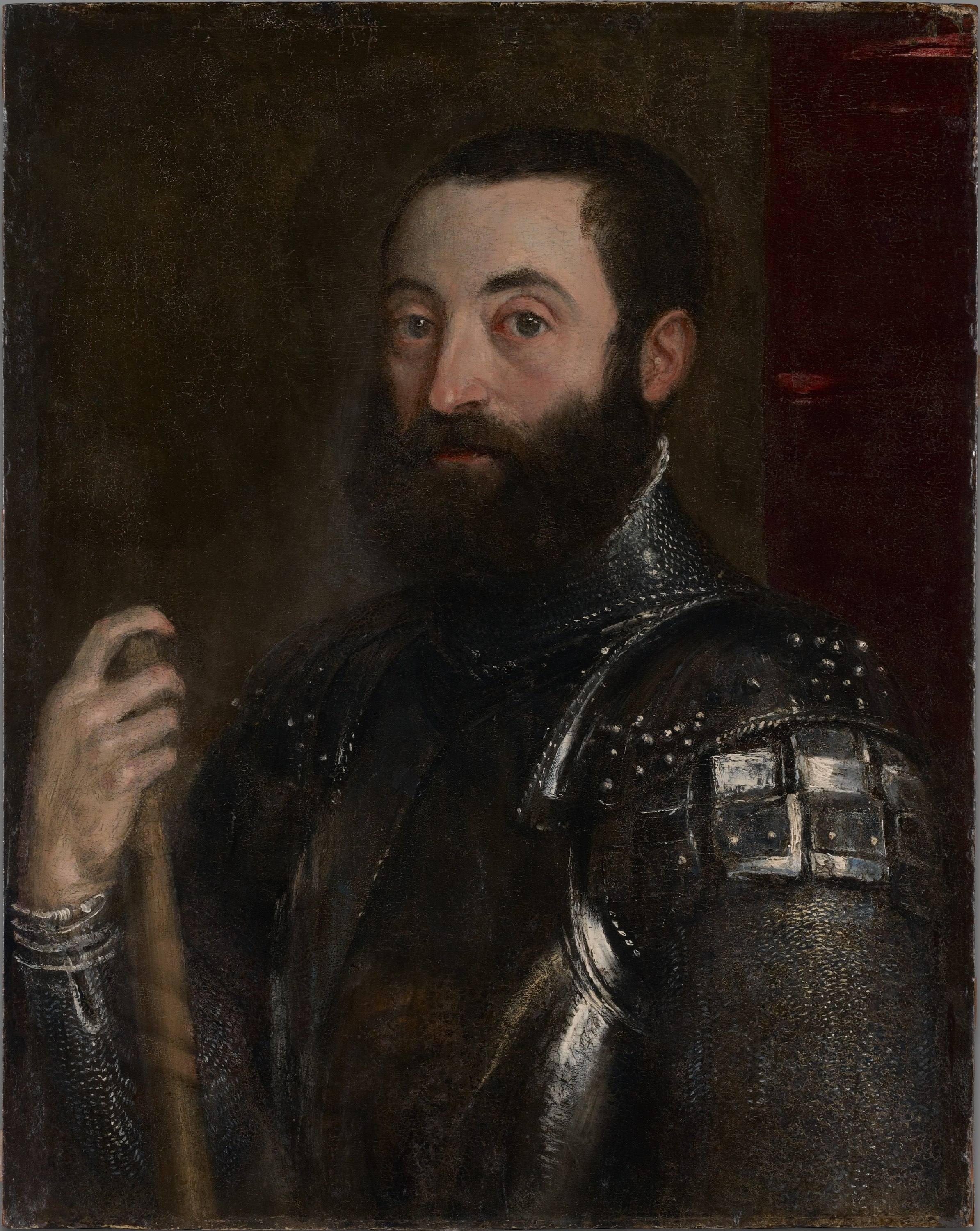
Guidobaldo II della Rovere

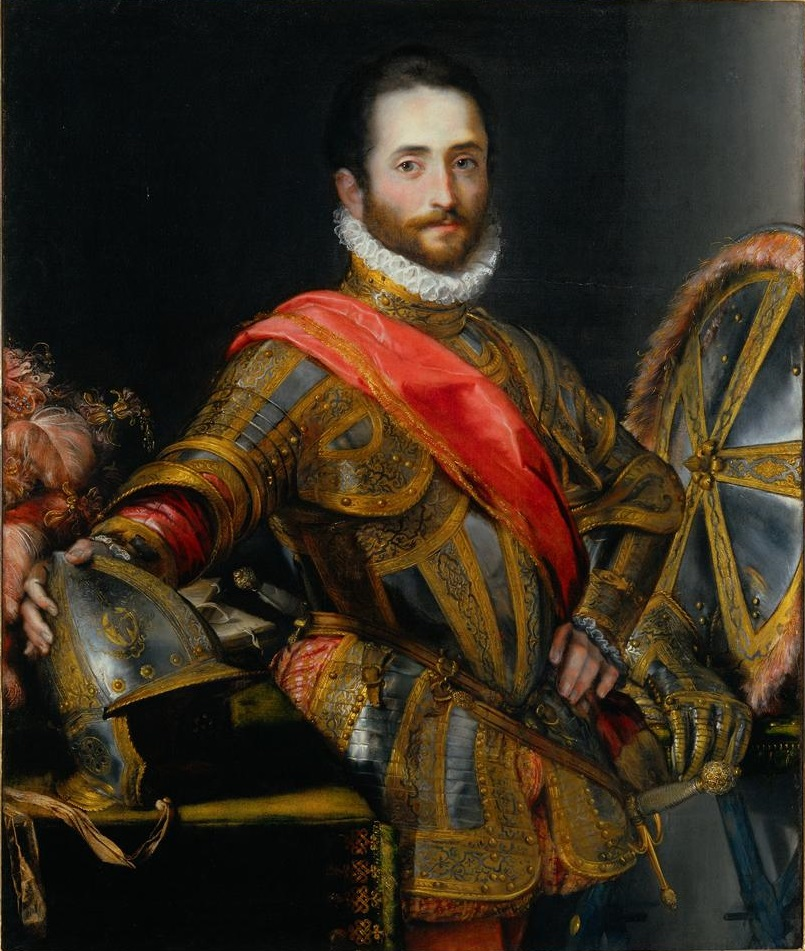
Francesco Maria II della Rovere

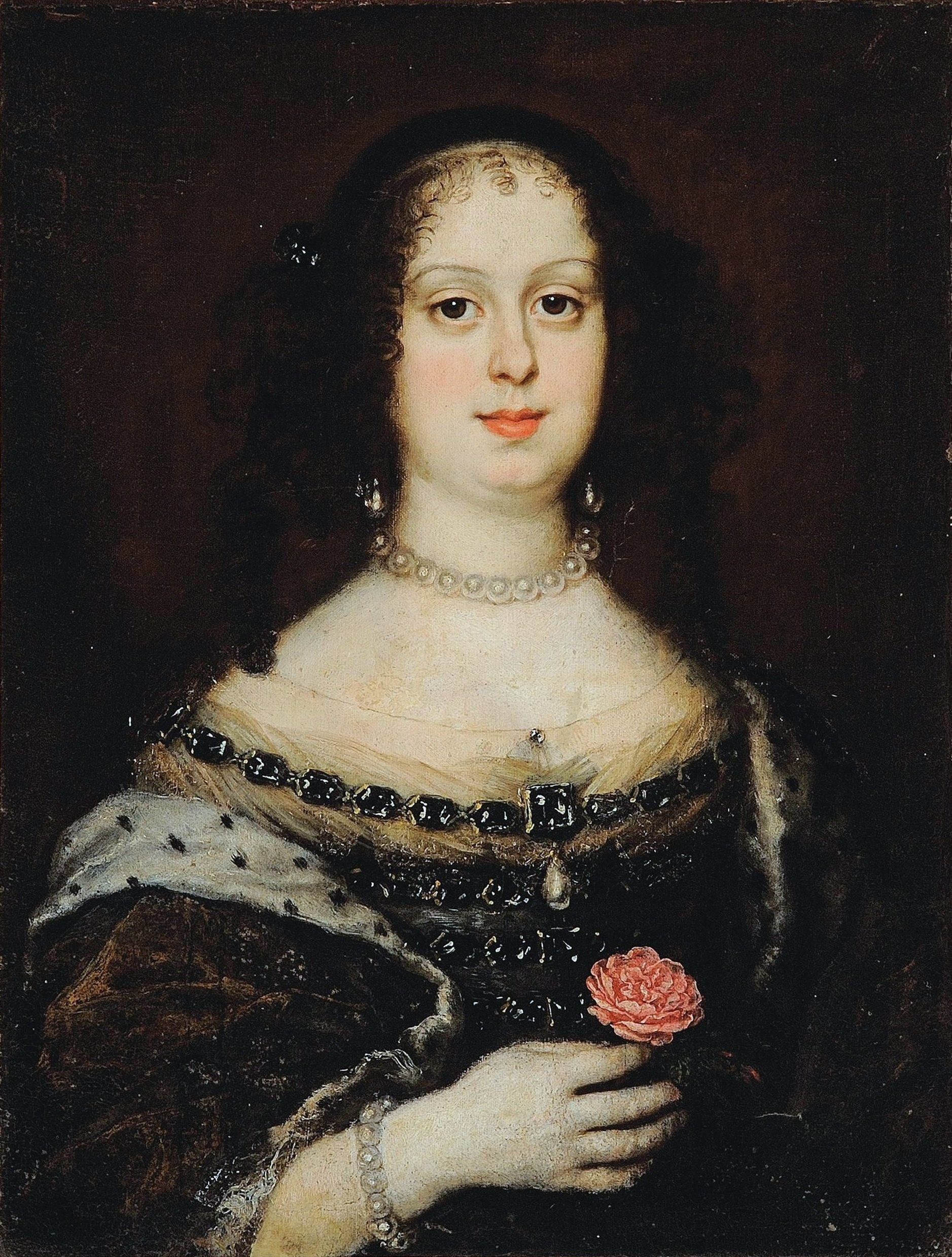
Vittoria della Rovere
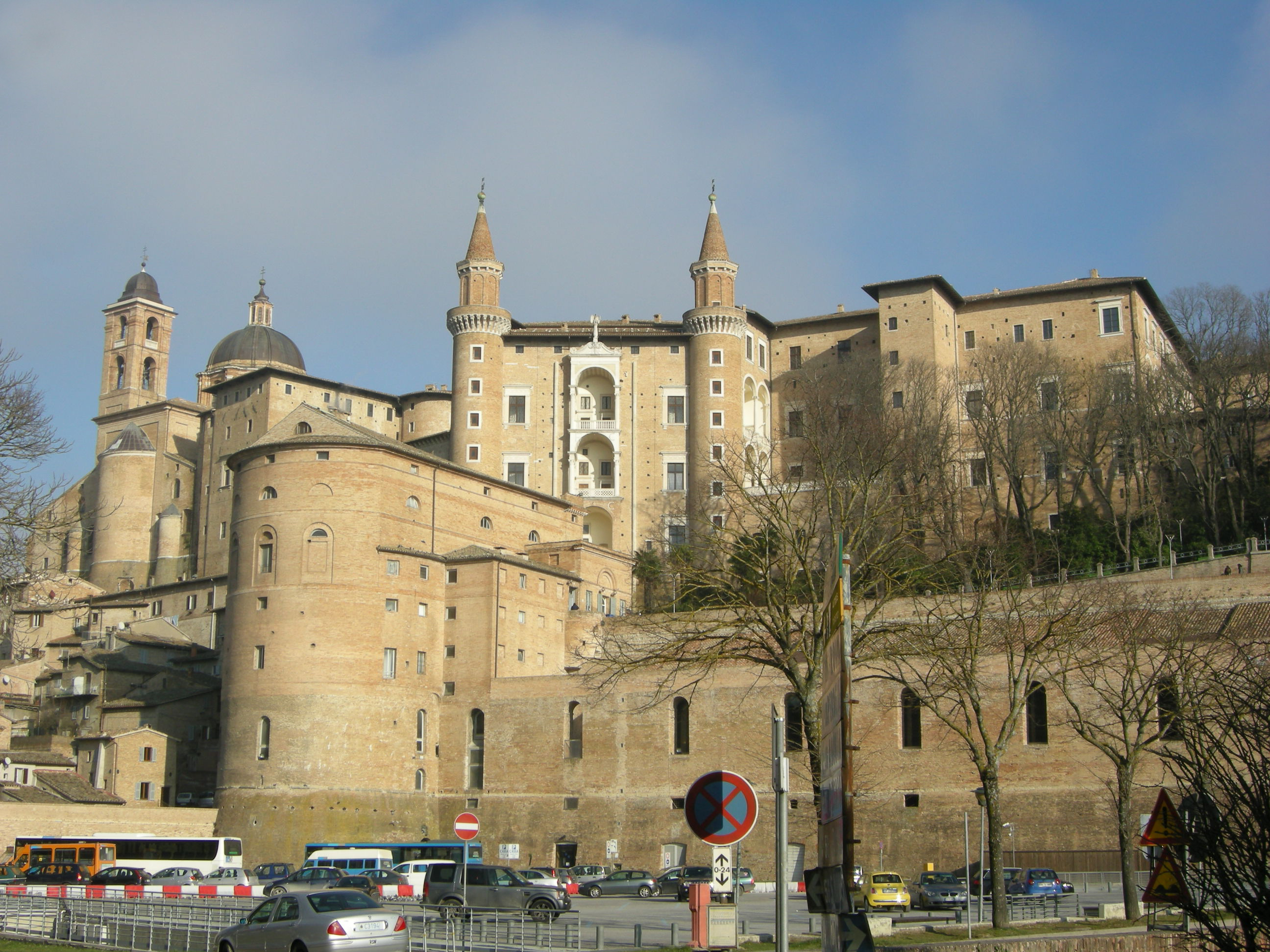
Palazzo Ducale, Urbino

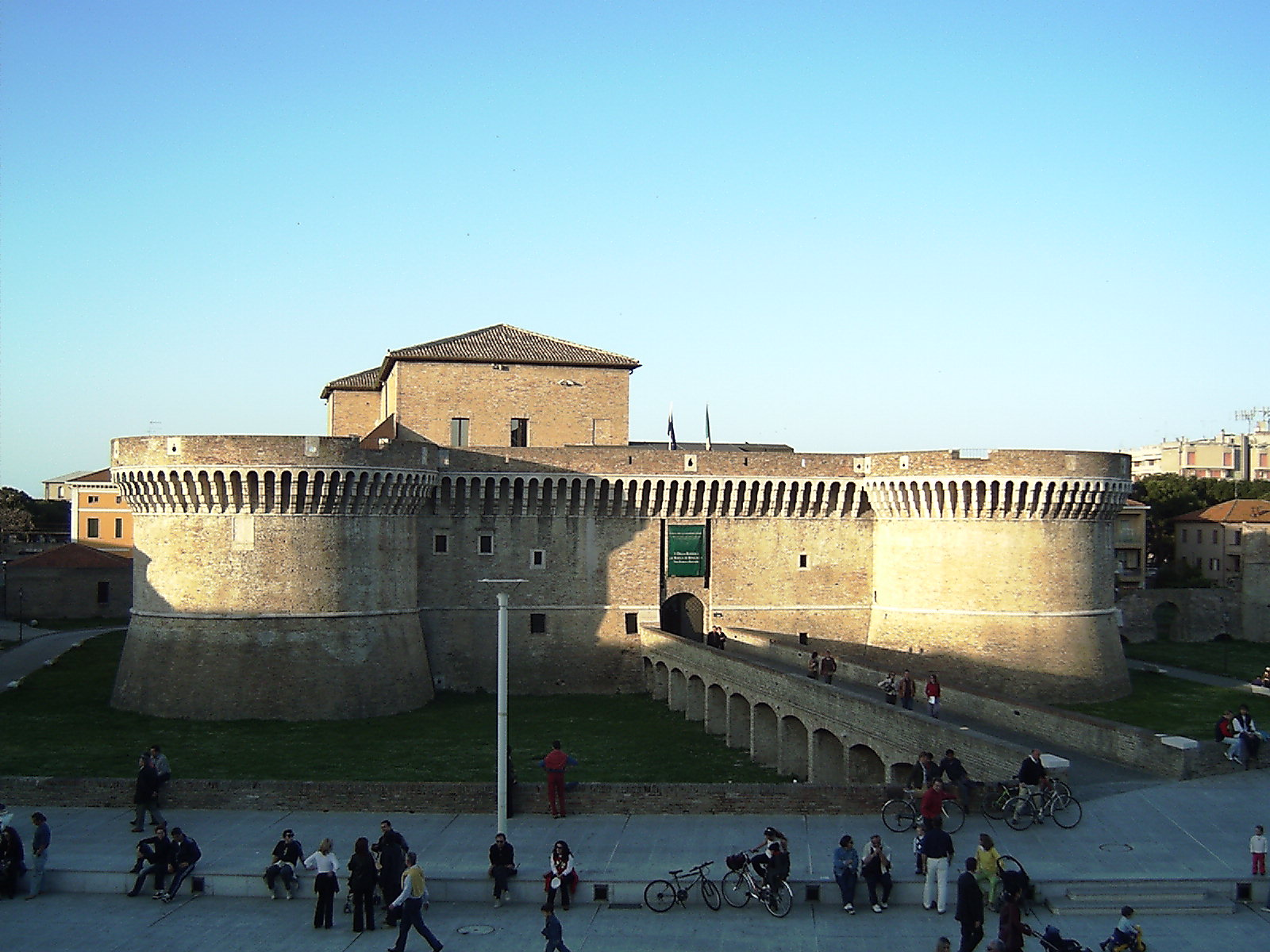
Rocca Della Rovere in Senigallia

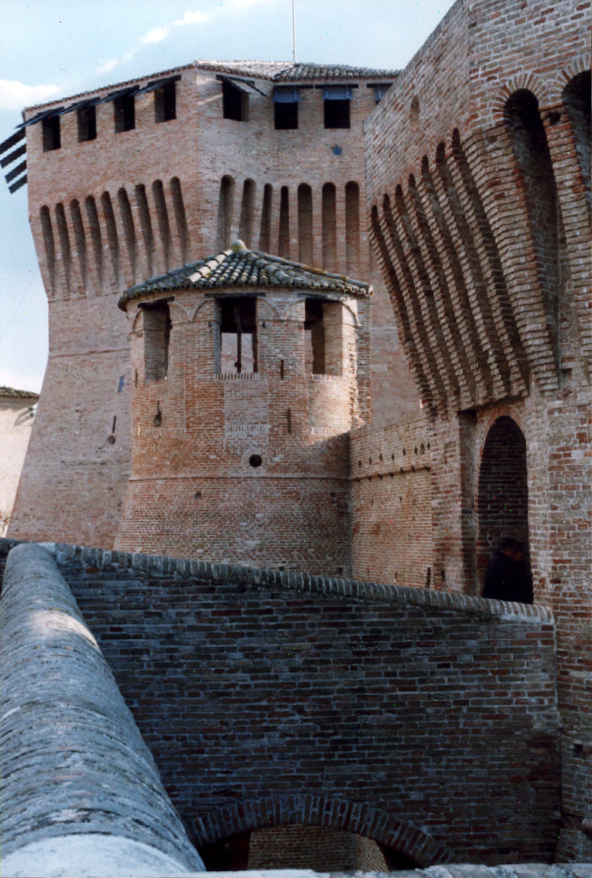
Rocca Roveresca in Mondavio

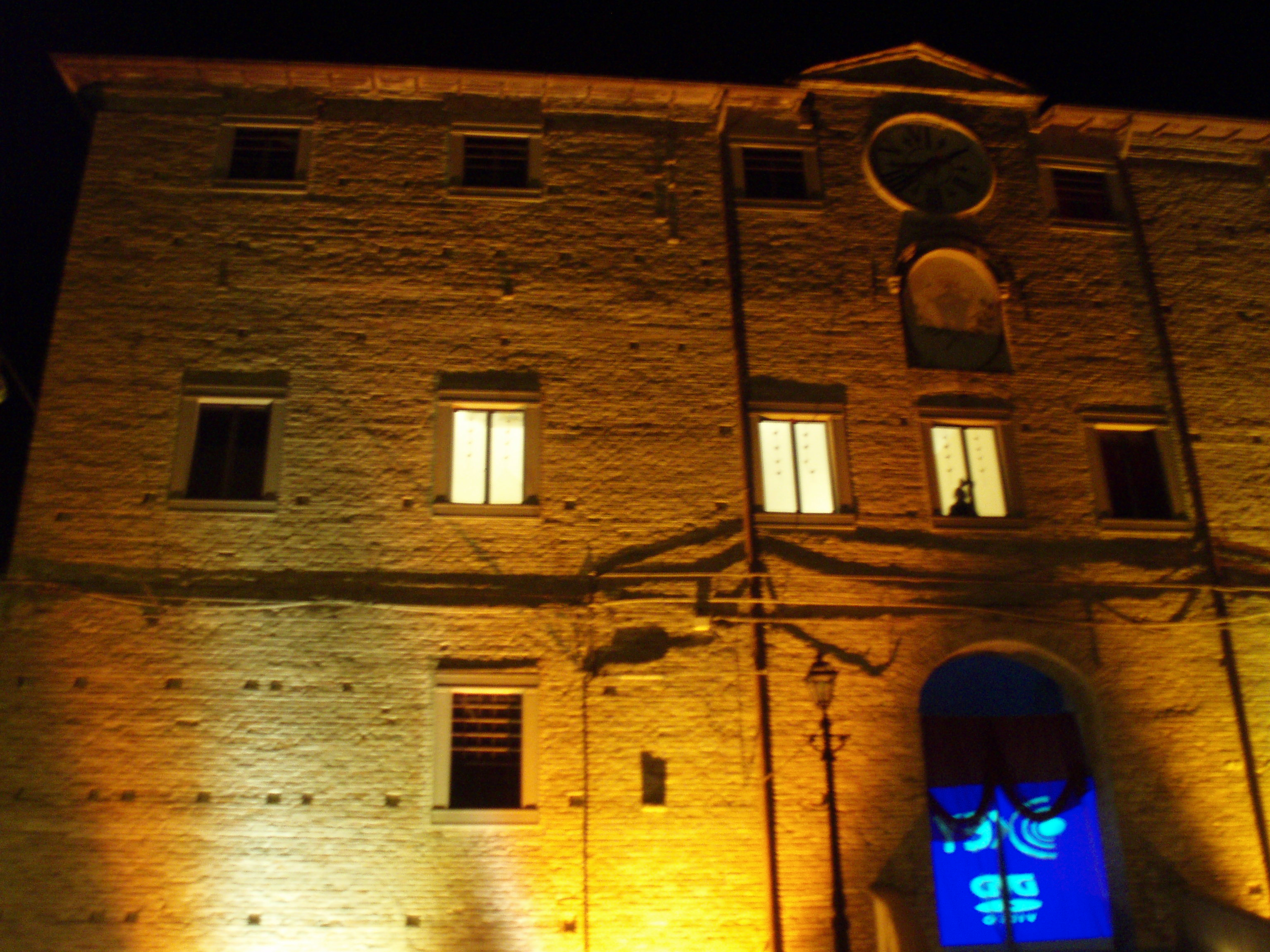
Palazzo Della Rovere in San Lorenzo in Campo

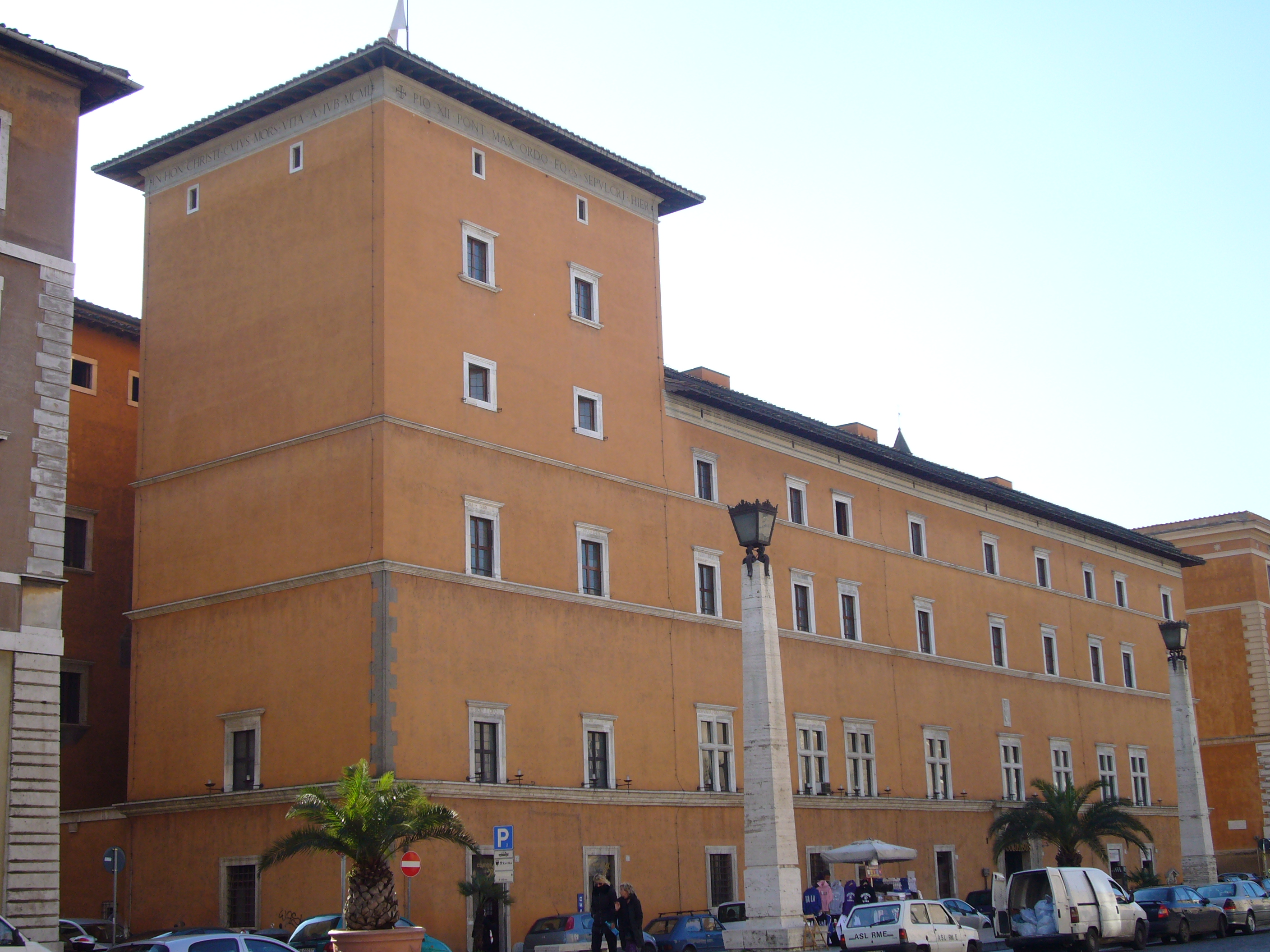
Palazzo Della Rovere in Rome
