= Cardinals created by Julius II =

Catholic appointments from 1503 to 1511

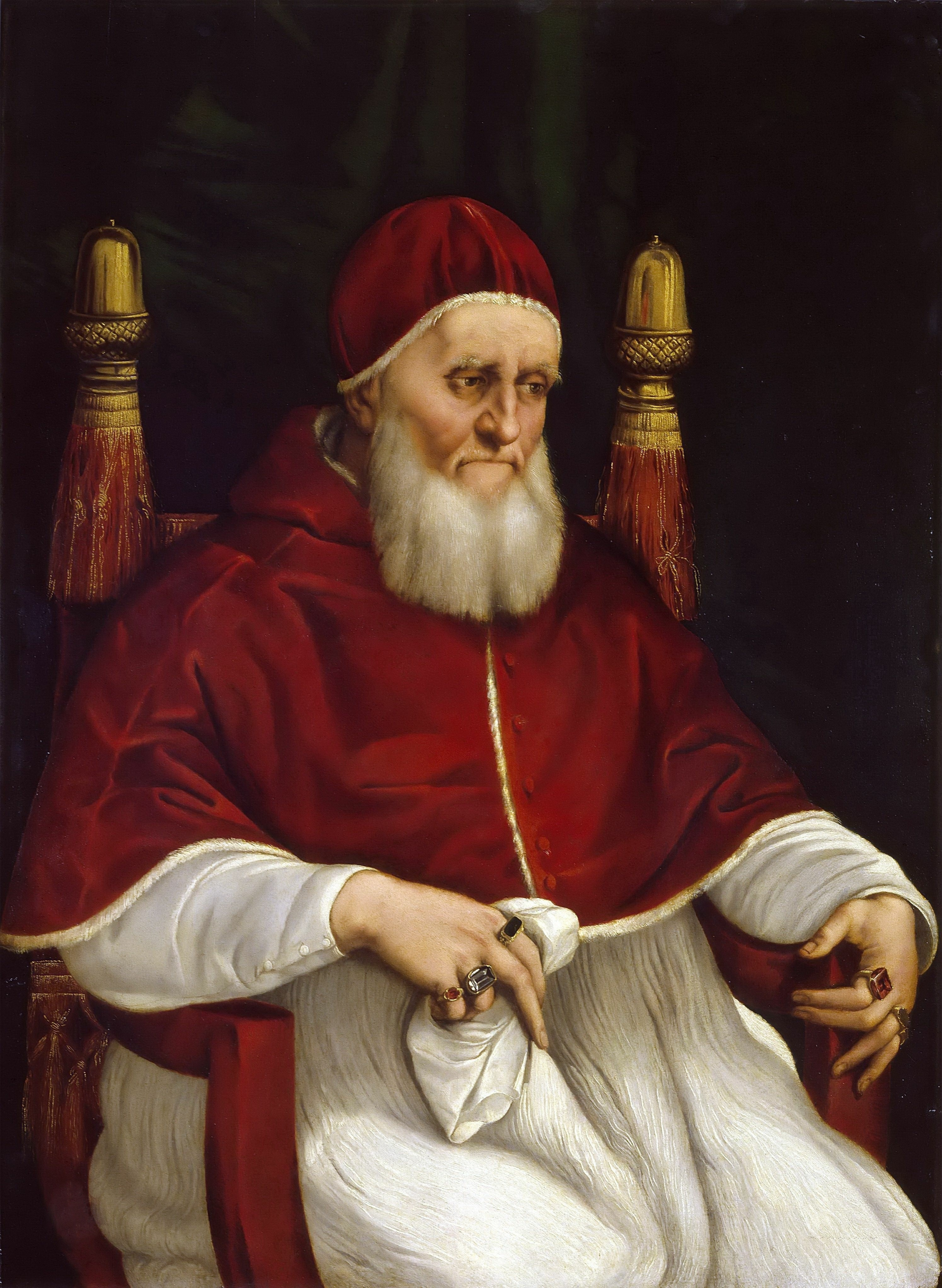
Pope Julius II (1443-1513).

Pope Julius II (r. 1503–1513) created 27 cardinals in 6 consistories.

== 29 November 1503 ==
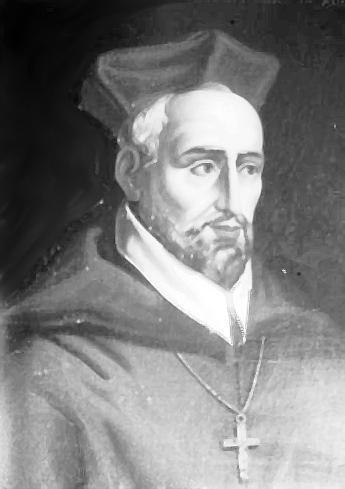
Clemente Grosso della Rovere (d. 1504), made a cardinal on November 29, 1503.

1. Clemente Grosso della Rovere
2. Galeotto Franciotti della Rovere
3. François Guillaume de Castelnau-Clermont-Ludève
4. Juan de Zúñiga y Pimentel

== 1 December 1505 ==
Francesco Alidosi (1455-1511), made a cardinal on December 1, 1505.

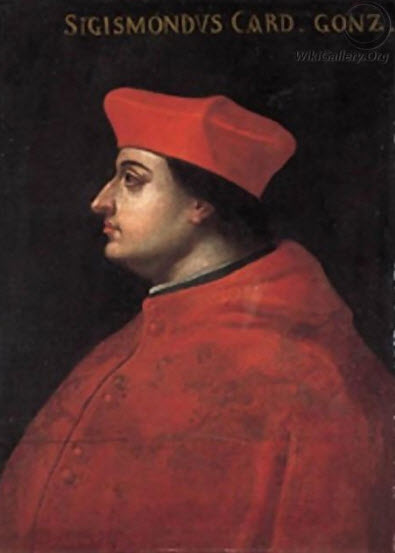
Sigismondo Gonzaga (1469-1525), made a cardinal on December 1, 1505.

1. Marco Vigerio della Rovere
2. Robert Guibé
3. Leonardo Grosso della Rovere
4. Antonio Ferrero
5. Francesco Alidosi
6. Gabriele de' Gabrielli
7. Fazio Giovanni Santori
8. Carlo Domenico del Carretto
9. Sigismondo Gonzaga

== 18 December 1506 ==
1. Jean-François de la Trémoille
2. René de Prie
3. Louis d'Amboise

== May 1507 ==
1. Francisco Jiménez de Cisneros

== 11 September 1507 ==
1. Sisto Gara della Rovere

== 10 March 1511 ==
1. Christopher Bainbridge
2. Antonio Maria Ciocchi del Monte
3. Pietro Accolti
4. Achille Grassi
5. Francesco Argentino
6. Matthäus Schiner
7. Bandinello Sauli
8. Alfonso Petrucci
9. Matthäus Lang von Wellenburg

== Sources ==
- Miranda, Salvador. "Consistories for the creation of Cardinals, 16th Century (1503-1605): Julius II (1503-1513)". The Cardinals of the Holy Roman Church. Florida International University. OCLC 53276621.
