= Raffaello della Rovere =

Italian noble

Raffaello della Rovere (Savona, 1423 – Rome, 30 April 1477) was an Italian noble, known for being the brother of Francesco della Rovere, later Pope Sixtus IV, and the father of Giuliano della Rovere, later Pope Julius II.

Coat of arms of the Della Rovere family

== Biography ==
Raffaello della Rovere, sometimes spelt as Raffaele, was born in Savona to Leonardo della Rovere (1390–1430) and Luchina Monteleoni (1391–1430). He came from a noble family. He married a woman of Greek origin named Teodora Manirolo in c. 1442. They had five children:

- Giuliano della Rovere (1443–1513), future Pope Julius II
- Bartolomeo della Rovere (1447–1496), Bishop of Massa and Ferrara
- Luchina (1451–1515), noblewoman, mother of Sisto Gara della Rovere
- Giovanni della Rovere (1457–1501), Duke of Sora
