= Jean-François de la Trémoille =

French Roman Catholic bishop and cardinal

Jean-François de la Trémoille (died 1507) was a French Roman Catholic bishop and cardinal.

== Biography ==
A member of the House of La Trémoille, Jean-François de la Trémoille was born in the Kingdom of France ca. 1465–70, the son of Louis I de La Trémoille, Viscount of Thouars and brother of Louis II de la Trémoille.

Early in his career, he became a canon of the cathedral chapter of Orléans Cathedral. He tried to become Bishop of Agen in 1487, but lost to Leonardo Grosso della Rovere. In 1488, he became a canon of the cathedral chapter of Castres Cathedral. He also became a protonotary apostolic.

On November 5, 1490, he was elected Archbishop of Auch. He became the apostolic administrator of the see of Poitiers on December 5, 1505, a position he held until his death.

Pope Julius II made him a cardinal priest in the consistory of December 18, 1506. He died before he received the red hat of a titular church.

He died in Milan sometime before June 19, 1507. He was buried in the collegiate church of Notre-Dame in Thouars. He received heart-burial; his heart was buried at the Franciscan convent in Milan.
