= 1513 conclave =

Election of Pope Leo X

Papal conclave March 1513

Dates and location
- 4–11 March 1513; Niccoline Chapel, Apostolic Palace, Papal States

Key officials
- Dean: Raffaele Riario
- Camerlengo: Raffaele Riario
- Protopriest: Tamás Bakócz
- Protodeacon: Giovanni de' Medici

Election
- Ballots: 2

Elected pope
- Giovanni de' Medici; Name taken: Leo X
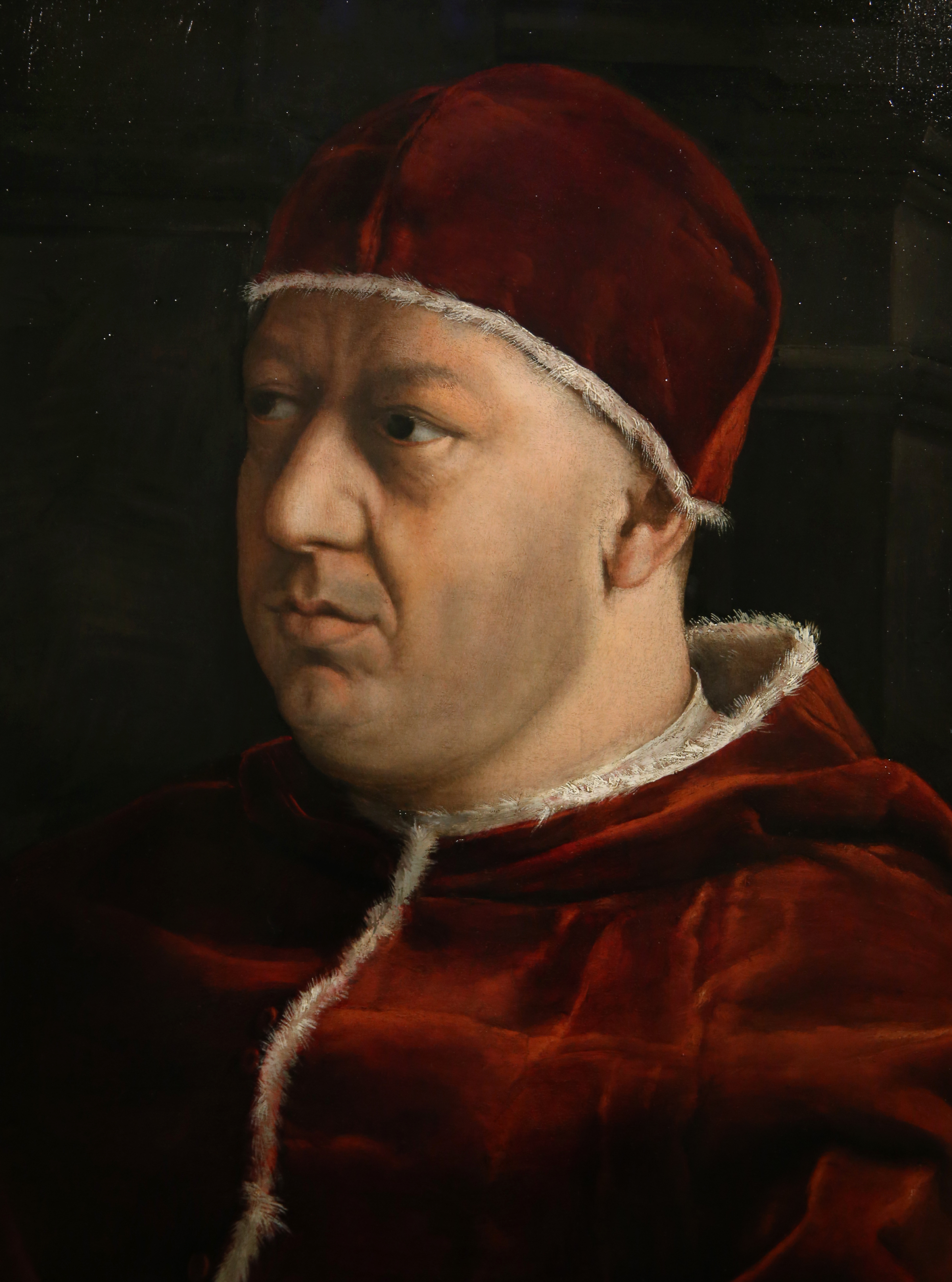

The 1513 papal conclave, occasioned by the death of Pope Julius II on 21 February 1513, opened on 4 March with twenty-five cardinals in attendance, out of a total number of thirty-one. The conclave was presided over by Cardinal Raffaele Sansoni Riario, who was both Dean of the College of Cardinals and Cardinal Chamberlain of the Holy Roman Church (Camerlengo). Voting began on 10 March, and there were only two Scrutinies. Negotiations after the first balloting led to the election of Cardinal Giovanni de'Medici, the son of Lorenzo the Magnificent and the de facto ruler of Florence, as Pope Leo X on the morning of 11 March.

== Death of Julius II ==
Most of the cardinals were already in Rome at the time of the death of Pope Julius II, on 21 February 1513. They had been participating in the Fifth Lateran Council, which had been summoned by the Pope to deal with the most pressing problems facing the Church. Julius II was so ill that he was not able to attend the Fifth Session on 16 February, but nineteen cardinals were present. Cardinal Riario presided in the Pope's absence. It was at that Session that Julius had solemnly republished his famous Bull, Cum tam divino, forbidding the buying and selling of sacred things (simony), and most especially the papal office. The Bull was approved by the Council, which was then recessed until April 11. At the Conclave, therefore, the continuation of the Council was a major concern, and was written into the Electoral Capitulations. At his last audience for the Cardinals, on 19 February, Pope Julius advised the Cardinals not to allow the schismatic cardinals from the 'Council of Pisa' to take part in the Conclave, nor to allow the Ecumenical Council any part in the proceedings.

In fact, the death of the Pope had been expected for some weeks. It had been reported generally (the Venetians knew it on 10 February) that the Pope was suffering from a double tertian fever (malaria), and that his doctors held little hope for his recovery. King Louis XII of France had been kept informed of the situation, and it was reported in Florence on 14 February that he had ordered the French cardinals to hasten their journey to Rome. He also wrote to the College of Cardinals, advising them not to rush into voting for a new pope, but to await the arrival of the French cardinals.

The Imperial Ambassador, Alberto Pio de Carpi, wrote to Maximilian I that the papabili were Riario, Fieschi and Luigi d'Aragona. The Cardinal prior Cardinalium presbyterorum, Tamás Bakócz, also had ambitions.

Cardinal Giovanni de' Medici, who had not been attending the Council, was ill in Florence with an anal fistula. He was ruling Florence on behalf of his family. Nonetheless he set out on his painful journey to Rome on 22 February in great haste; he was certainly in Rome on February 28. He employed the next few days in Rome in profitable conversations. He met, for example, with Cardinal Francesco Soderini, whose family had helped drive the Medici out of Florence in 1494, with the support of Louis XII, and who had been driven out of Florence in their turn by the resurgent Medici in 1512. It was agreed that the Soderini would be repatriated to Florence and that the feud would end. Soderini became a strong supporter of Medici in the Conclave, and Medici voted for Soderini on the first Scrutiny.

== Sealed in the Conclave ==
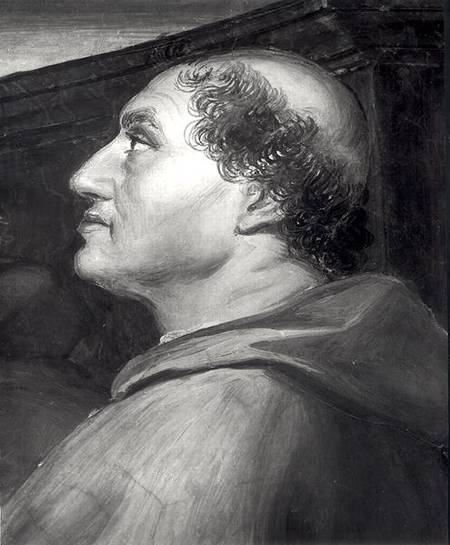
Rafaele Riario was a leading candidate in the Conclave. Riario, a former member of the Pazzi conspiracy against the Medici, would later be caught plotting against Leo X and be forced to surrender the Palazzo della Cancelleria to avoid execution.

Pope Julius II had created twenty-seven cardinals during his reign of more than nine years. Twelve of these had died, leaving fifteen cardinals, who were referred to as the 'Younger Cardinals'. They formed a faction, under the leadership of the della Rovere cardinals. The 'Elder Cardinals', named by earlier popes, numbered sixteen, and were led by Raffaele Sansoni Riario, the Cardinal of S. Giorgio, a nephew of Pope Sixtus IV.

Twenty-five of the living thirty-one cardinals entered the conclave on Friday 4 March. Cardinal Sisto Gara della Rovere, one of Pope Julius' nephews, was so ill that he had to be carried into the Conclave, and he was given special accommodations. Cardinal Soderini and Cardinal de'Medici were also ill. Medici had been in Rome since the 28th of February, but he was suffering from a fistula, and needed to be operated on. He did not enter the Conclave until 6 March, and had to be carried into the Conclave area in a sedan chair. The Cardinal Camerlengo, Raffaele Riario, accompanied by Cardinal d' Aragona and Cardinal Farnese, made the traditional examination of the entire area of the Conclave, and then supervised the sealing of the doors.

The first several days were spent in the regular daily Congregations on the drafting of Electoral Capitulations and regulating the procedures of the Conclave. The Conclavists, too, were drawing up a list of demands, which included the disposal of the property of whichever Cardinal happened to be elected pope. The successful candidate's Conclavists were entitled to their employer's property as 'spoils', but the other conclavists wanted their share.

It had been the custom for hundreds of years for each cardinal, at the time of the second Obeisance to the new Pope, to present him with a small memorandum (libellus), in which was listed the names of the Cardinal's most favored followers with specific requests for benefices for them. These requests were usually granted, usually on the spot. Each cardinal had to draw up his list.

A copy of the Capitulations was seen by the Florentine diarist, Luca Landucci. He reported that there were thirty clauses. One provided that the Pope could not create more than two cardinals from members of his own family, when the number of Cardinals was below 24, and with the agreement of two-thirds of the cardinals. Another required that there be a General Council of Christians to reform the Church, and to prepare a crusade against the Infidel. Another required that the text of the Capitulations be read out twice a year in Congregation. Another stated that the Roman Curia could not be transferred elsewhere in Italy without the consent of half of the cardinals; and that it could not be transferred outside of Italy without the consent of two-thirds. Ludwig Pastor, the historian of the Papacy, quotes those and others: that any cardinal who did not already possess an income of 6000 ducats would be given a subsidy of 200 ducats per month; that no cardinal would be appointed a Legate against his will; that all benefices connected with the Lateran Basilica and the Vatican Basilica would be conferred on Romans only. The list went on. No pope ever felt obliged to carry out all or any of these Capitulations.

Among the conclavists was Giacomo di Brescia, the private physician required by Cardinal Medici; Giacomo, despite his plea, was not permitted to leave early once his services were no longer required.

=== Balloting ===
The first Scrutiny took place on March 10 after a ceremonial reading of Julius II's bull against simony. The reading was done at the special request of the 'Elder Cardinals'; there was, of course, no precedent. The voting itself took place in the chapel of S. Niccolo da Bari, which was replaced by the Cappella Paolina in the reign of Pope Paul III. As the ranking cardinal-deacon, prior Diaconum, Medici himself was charged with the counting of the ballots. Seventeen votes were required for a canonical election. Cardinal Serra received thirteen votes on the first ballot, Grosso della Rovere 8, Accolti 7, Antonio del Monte 7, Bakócz 8, Fieschi 7, Finale 5, Soderini 4, Robert Guibé 3, Adriano de Castello 3, Achille de Grassis 3, Farnese 3, Grimani 2, Bainbridge 2, Vigerio 1, Remolino 1, and Medici 1. Medici himself—who voted for Soderini, Antonio del Monte, and Pietro Accolti—received the vote of Matthäus Schiner. Riario received not a single vote—so much for the designation papabile. Although Pirie subscribes this outcome to chance (see below), Roscoe argues that Alborense had the support of the older cardinals, while the younger, and particularly the royal and noble cardinals supported Medici. The alternative view, however, points out that the Older Cardinals and the papabili were astonished at the votes for Serra. It cannot be, therefore, that all those votes were their own. Rather, some of the thirteen votes for Cardinal Serra (Alborese) came from the supporters of Medici, that is, the 'Younger Cardinals', who did not want to reveal their support for Medici ahead of the appropriate moment.

=== Reconsideration of positions ===
Riario's position, without a single vote in his favor, must have caused him to reconsider his position. He was not papabile. He therefore had to make some sort of accommodation with his enemy Medici. That night, in the main hall of the Conclave (the Sala Ducale?), the Cardinals and Conclavists observed Cardinal Medici and Cardinal Raffaele Riario in close conversation for more than an hour, although no other observer was able to make out the subject. Between then and the time for the vote next morning, a rumor spread among the cardinals as to the outcome of the conversation, and every other cardinal flocked to Medici's cell to congratulate him. Trollope claims that every cardinal did such because "it is ill voting against a man to-day who is to be the despotic master of your fate and fortunes on the morrow". Actually, the success of Medici was due to the unity of the 'Younger Cardinals' behind their chosen candidate, as much as to Medici's mildness and generosity toward friend and enemy, as Pio de Carpi explained to the Emperor Maximilian.

== Election ==
Medici was elected unanimously in the Scrutiny on the morning of 11 March. The statement of unanimity is not surprising; every conclave strives to end unanimiter et concorditer, leaving no grounds for a schism. A window which had been boarded closed for the Conclave was opened, and Cardinal Alessandro Farnese (future Pope Paul III), who was now senior Cardinal Deacon in place of Medici, announced the election of Medici by his chosen papal name, Leo X. Since Medici had only been ordained a deacon, it was necessary for him to be ordained a priest and consecrated a bishop immediately. He was ordained a priest on 15 March, and consecrated on 17 March 1513 by Cardinal Raffaele Sansoni Riario.

Florentine banker Filippo Strozzi the Younger accompanied Medici to Rome for the conclave; Strozzi's brother (a disciple of Savonarola) claimed that: "inasmuch as the latter aspired not without good reason to the Papacy, it was likely enough that he might have to vail himself of Filippo's credit". In the event, Julius II's bull against simony had all the participants on alert, and there is no hint of simony at the Conclave of 1513.

== Pirie's account ==
According to Valerie Pirie's The Triple Crown (1936):

Twenty-five cardinals entered the conclave. The absence of the French element left practically only two contending parties—the young and the old. The former had secretly settled on Giovanni de' Medici; the second openly supported S. Giorgio, England's candidate. The Sacred College had been assembled almost a week before the first serious scrutiny took place. Many of the cardinals, wishing to temporise and conceal their real intentions, had voted for the man they considered least likely to have any supporters. As luck would have it, thirteen prelates had selected the same outsider, with the result that they all but elected Arborense, the most worthless nonentity present. This narrow shave gave the Sacred College such a shock that its members determined to come to some agreement which would put matters on a more satisfactory basis for both parties.

== Electors ==
Twenty-five cardinals participated in the election:

- Raffaele Riario
- Domenico Grimani
- Jaume Serra i Cau
- Marco Vigerio della Rovere
- Francesco Soderini
- Giovanni de' Medici (elected Pope Leo X)
- Alessandro Farnese (future Pope Paul III)
- Luigi d'Aragona
- Tamás Bakócz
- Marco Cornaro
- Francisco de Remolins
- Niccolò Fieschi
- Adriano di Castello
- Robert Guibé
- Leonardo Grosso della Rovere
- Carlo Domenico del Carretto
- Sigismondo Gonzaga
- Sisto Gara della Rovere
- Christopher Bainbridge
- Antonio Maria Ciocchi del Monte
- Pietro Accolti
- Achille Grassi
- Matthäus Schiner
- Bandinello Sauli
- Alfonso Petrucci

Six more cardinals did not participate in the conclave:

- Ippolito d'Este
- Philippe de Luxembourg
- Amanieu d'Albret
- François Guillaume de Castelnau-Clermont-Ludève
- Francisco Jiménez de Cisneros
- Matthäus Lang von Wellenburg

Four more had been excommunicated and declared schismatic by Julius II, and thus could not participate (all were reinstated by Leo X):

- Federico di Sanseverino
- Bernardino López de Carvajal
- Guillaume Briçonnet
- René de Prie

== In Artist ==
The Gate of Life

In this novel (Az élet kapuja in Hungarian) - widely considered his finest historical novel - Hungarian author Ferenc Herczeg dramatizes the events of the conclave, weaving in fictional elements. It was on the strength of this work that he was nominated - albeit unsuccessfully - for the Nobel Prize in Literature on three occasions (1925, 1926, 1927).
