= Siege of Mirandola (1511) =

Part of the War of the League of Cambrai

Coordinates: 44.9052°N 11.0668°E

- Part of the War of the League of Cambrai
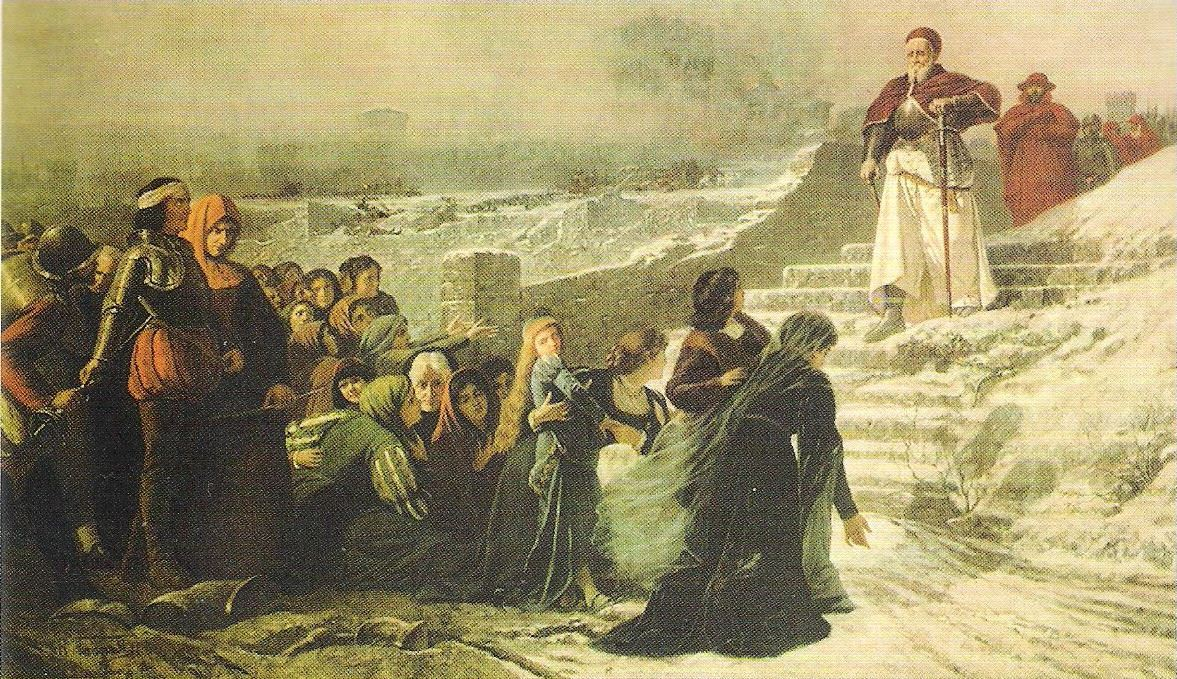
- Pope Julius II on the walls of Mirandola (Raffaello Tancredi, oil on canvas, 1890)
Date	2–19 January 1511
Location	Mirandola, Emilia (present-day Italy)
Result	Papal victory

Belligerents
Papal States; Duchy of Urbino; Spanish Empire; Republic of Venice	Kingdom of France; Duchy of Ferrara; Duchy of Mirandola

Commanders and leaders
Pope Julius II	Alessandro Trivulzio

Units involved
2,500 infantrymen; 400 knights; 100–150 man of arms	400 French infantrymen; 100 Ferrara soldiers; 70 Mirandola soldiers

Casualties and losses
400 casualties	100 casualties

The siege of Mirandola took place from 2 January to 19 January 1511 as a part of Pope Julius II's campaign to keep France from dominating northern Italy during the War of the League of Cambrai. At that time Mirandola was the capital of the Duchy of Mirandola in the Italian region of Emilia. The fortress was defended by 400 French infantrymen commanded by Alessandro Trivulzio, 100 soldiers from Ferrara, and 70 Mirandola soldiers. The siege was conducted by Julius after he had broken away from the League of Cambrai and entered into a treaty with Venice.

== Background ==
In the early years of the 16th Century, the leading powers of Europe including the Holy Roman Empire, and France all had an interest in the territories that today constitute Italy. Among the local Italian powers, the Republic of Venice and the Papal States ranked among the strongest independent political entities.

For Pope Julius II, the leader of the Roman Catholic Church and the ruler of the Papal States, the presence of foreign powers in Italy represented a significant problem as he planned to make the Papacy the arbiter of the Italian Wars. (Note: Above all, the notion of Julius II for barbarian hostility seems to have been a genuine inspiration...the Pope's desired derived...from the Pope's harbouring an ancient grudge against them, or because over the years his suspicion grew into hate, or because he desired the glory of being the man who liberated Italy from the barbarians.) Another issue, and more immediate after the occupation in Romagna of Rimini, Faenza, and Cervia, was the dominance of Venice: Julius felt that the Papal States could prosper as a buffer between two foreign powers if it could grow and maintain its possessions in central Italy. A strong local competitor such as Venice, however, would hamper the Papal States' ability to dominate central Italy.

As a result, on 25 March 1509, Julius joined the leading European powers in the League of Cambrai which had as its expressed purpose the partition of the possessions of the Republic of Venice.

== War of the League of Cambrai ==
When the War of the League of Cambrai broke out in May 1509, Venice immediately suffered defeat at the hands of the French at the Battle of Vailà. The Venetian military and their mercenaries fell into disarray and the members of the League of Cambrai seized numerous cities and towns in northern Italy, central Italy, and along the Neapolitan Coast. Immediately thereafter, Venice approached Julius attempting to make peace and break apart the Cambrai alliance. Negotiations were undertaken and on 11 February 1510 Venice agreed to the peace terms of Julius.

== Pope Julius II's campaign against the French ==
Concurrent with the peace agreement with Venice, Julius withdrew from the League of Cambrai. He now turned his attention to stopping the French from dominating northern Italy. First, Julius attempted to ally unsuccessfully with the Holy Roman Empire and Spain in a new league against France. When that did not work, Julius let the Venetian military revitalize and supplemented that force by entering into a five-year alliance with the Swiss guard mercenaries.

To start his campaign against the French, Julius first set his sights on the Duchy of Ferrara, a fief of the Holy See, that continued to be a member of the League of Cambrai and an ally of the French. In August 1510, Julius executed an unsuccessful attack on Ferrara. Although this alarmed Louis XII, the French did not counterattack with armed forces.
Undeterred, Julius quickly attacked and took the city of Modena. In response, Charles II d'Amboise, Seigneur de Chaumont, the French Governor of Milan, marched a French force in October toward Bologna, the northern headquarters of the Papal States.

With a force too small to defend Bologna, Julius entered into negotiations with Chaumont in an attempt to stall until reinforcements could arrive. Ultimately, Venetian and Spanish reinforcements arrived and the French withdrew.

== Attack and siege of Mirandola ==
Although the Pope's forces were too small to attempt another attack on Ferrara, Julius was determined to continue his campaign against France and chose to attack two outposts of the dominion of Ferrara, Concordia and Mirandola. The Pope's reasoning was that holding these castles west of Ferrara would prevent the French from coming to the aid of Ferrara.

Concordia fell easily, but Mirandola withstood the Papal attack, and as the new year started a siege of Mirandola began. Unhappy with his generals, Julius set out for Mirandola on 2 January 1511. Upon arriving in Mirandola, Julius berated his generals and immediately took command of the military operation. Still, Mirandola held out and even refused to surrender when Julius threatened that the castle would be pillaged after it was taken.

On 19 January 1511, Mirandola surrendered. Once inside the castle, Julius did his utmost to restrain his troops from pillage and to protect the people.

== Aftermath ==
After the siege and conquest of Mirandola, Julius attempted unsuccessfully to gain Ferrara and to separate the Duke of Ferrara from the French by means of negotiation. In addition to his failure to secure Ferrara, other affairs for Julius would not go well in early 1511 as the French attacked and captured Bologna on 23 May 1511 and retook Mirandola a few days later. Before 1511 ended, however, Julius would be successful in creating a new league, the Holy League, aimed against France, which ultimately resulted in the withdrawal of the French from Milan and Italy in May 1512.

== See also ==
- Battle of Marignano
- Siege of Mirandola (1551)
- Italian Wars
- List of battles of the Italian Wars
