= Pope Julius II =

Head of the Catholic Church from 1503 to 1513

- Bishop of Rome
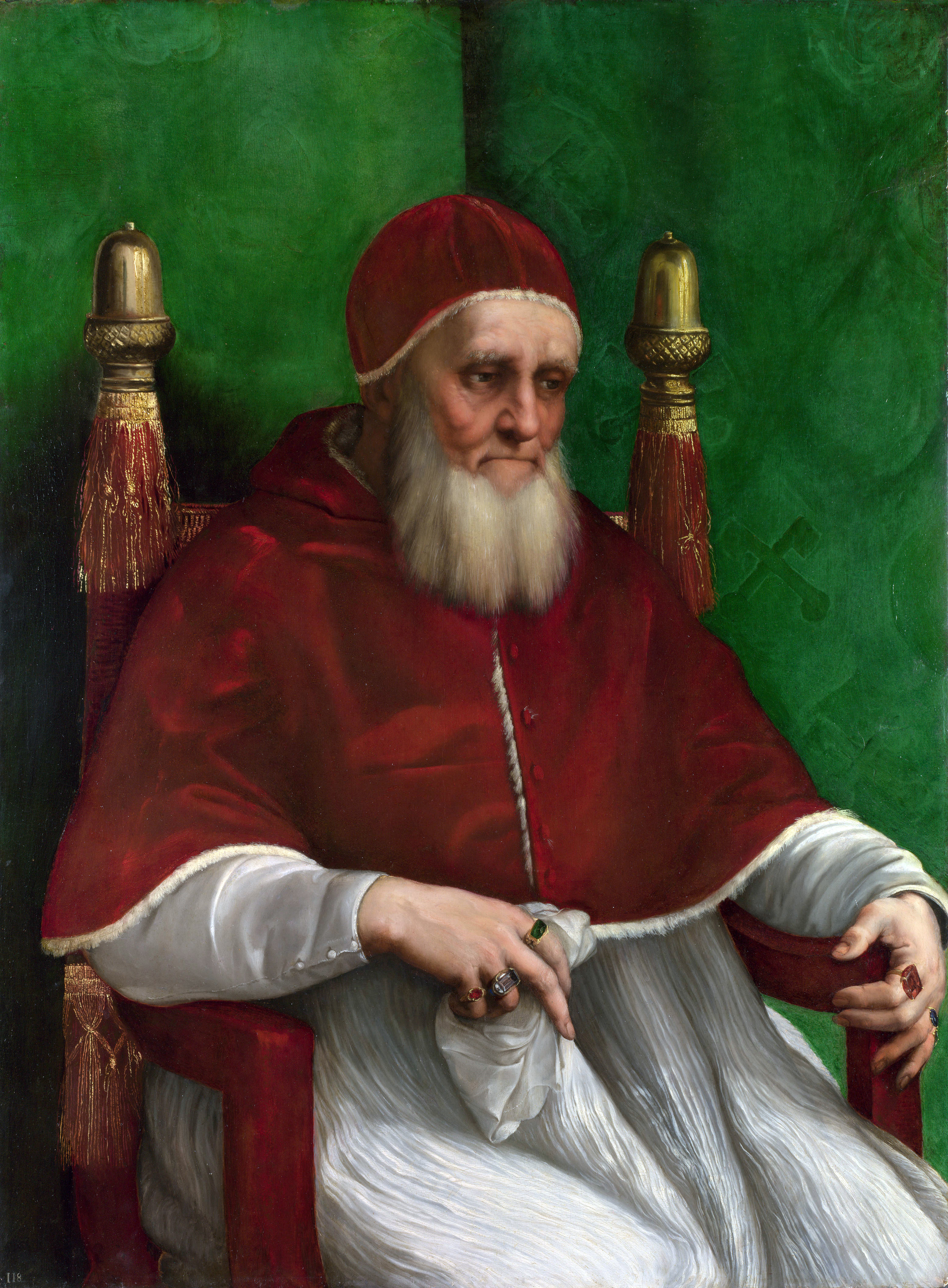
- Portrait of Pope Julius II, 1511–1512
- Church: Catholic
- Papacy began: 1 November 1503
- Papacy ended: 21 February 1513
- Predecessor: Pius III
- Successor: Leo X
- Previous posts: Bishop of Catania (1473‍–‍1474); Archbishop of Avignon (1474‍–‍1503); Cardinal-bishop of Sabina (1479‍–‍1483); Camerlengo of the Cardinals (1479); Cardinal-bishop of Ostia (1483‍–‍1503)

Orders
- Ordination: 1471
- Consecration: 1481 (?) by Sixtus IV
- Created cardinal: 15 December 1471 by Sixtus IV

Personal details
- Born: Giuliano della Rovere; 5 December 1443 Albisola, Republic of Genoa
- Died: 21 February 1513 (aged 69) Rome, Papal States
- Buried: St. Peter's Basilica, Rome
- Parents: Raffaello della Rovere and Theodora Manerola
- Children: Felice della Rovere

- Coat of arms

Pope Julius II (Latin: Iulius II; Italian: Giulio II; born Giuliano della Rovere; 5 December 1443 – 21 February 1513) was head of the Catholic Church and leader of the Papal States from 1503 to his death, in February 1513.

Nicknamed the Warrior Pope, the Battle Pope or the Fearsome Pope, it is often speculated that he had chosen his papal name not in honour of Pope Julius I but in emulation of Julius Caesar. One of the most powerful and influential popes, Julius II was a central figure of the High Renaissance and left a significant cultural and political legacy. As a result of his policies during the Italian Wars, the Papal States increased their power and centralization, and the office of the papacy continued to be crucial, diplomatically and politically, during the entirety of the 16th century in Italy and Europe.

In 1506, Julius II established the Vatican Museums and initiated the rebuilding of the St. Peter's Basilica. The same year he organized the famous Swiss Guard for his personal protection and commanded a successful campaign in Romagna against local lords. The interests of Julius II lay also in the New World, as he ratified the Treaty of Tordesillas, establishing the first bishoprics in the Americas and beginning the Catholicization of Latin America. In 1508, he commissioned the Raphael Rooms and Michelangelo's paintings in the Sistine Chapel.

Pope Julius II allowed people seeking indulgences to donate money to the Church, which would be used for the construction of Saint Peter's Basilica. (Note: Indulgences, which remit the temporal effects of sins that have already been forgiven, involve the person receiving the indulgence performing a penance of some kind, such as performing a certain devotional practice or doing some sort of good work, which can take the form of donating to a charitable cause.) He was fiercely satirized after his death by Erasmus of Rotterdam in Julius Excluded from Heaven, in which the drunken pope, denied entry to heaven by St. Peter, justifies his worldly life and plots to create a rival abode from which to conquer heaven.

== Overview of the Italian politics of his reign ==
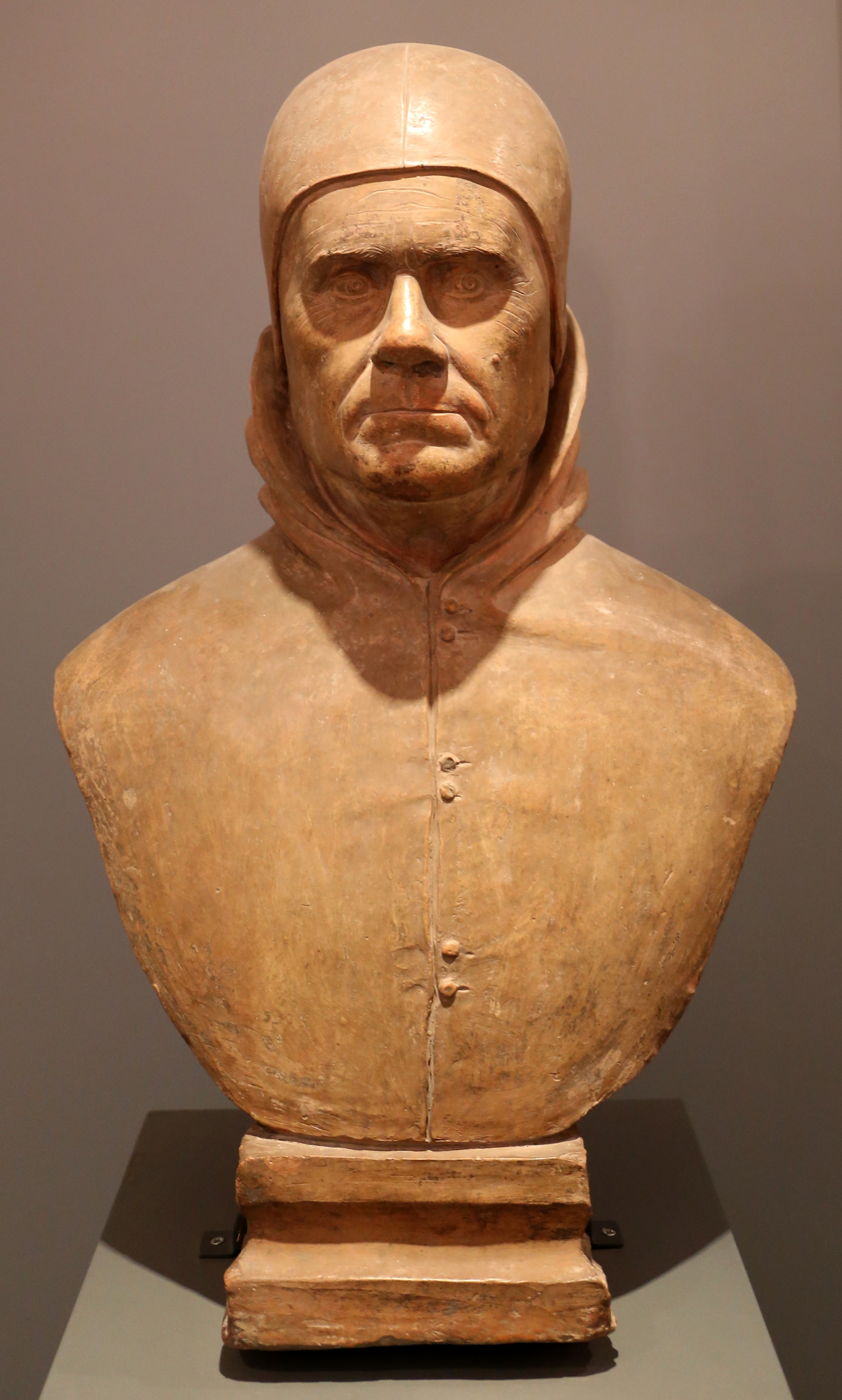
Bust of Julius II

Julius II became pope in the context of the Italian Wars, a period in which the major powers of Europe fought for primacy in the Italian Peninsula. Louis XII of France controlled the Duchy of Milan, previously held by the Sforzas, and French influence had replaced that of the Medici in the Republic of Florence. The Kingdom of Naples was under Spanish rule. Maximilian I of Austria was hostile to France and Venice, and desired to descend into Italy in order to be crowned Holy Roman Emperor by the pope. The conclave capitulation preceding his election included several terms, such as the opening of an ecumenical council and the organization of a crusade against the Ottoman Turks. Once crowned, Julius II proclaimed instead his goal to centralize the Papal States (in large part a patchwork of communes and signorie) and "free Italy from the barbarians".

In his early years as pope, Julius II targeted the members of the House of Borgia (the Spanish family of the previous Pope, Alexander VI), exiling them or destroying their influence. Cesare Borgia, Duke of Romagna, shared the same fate and lost his possessions.

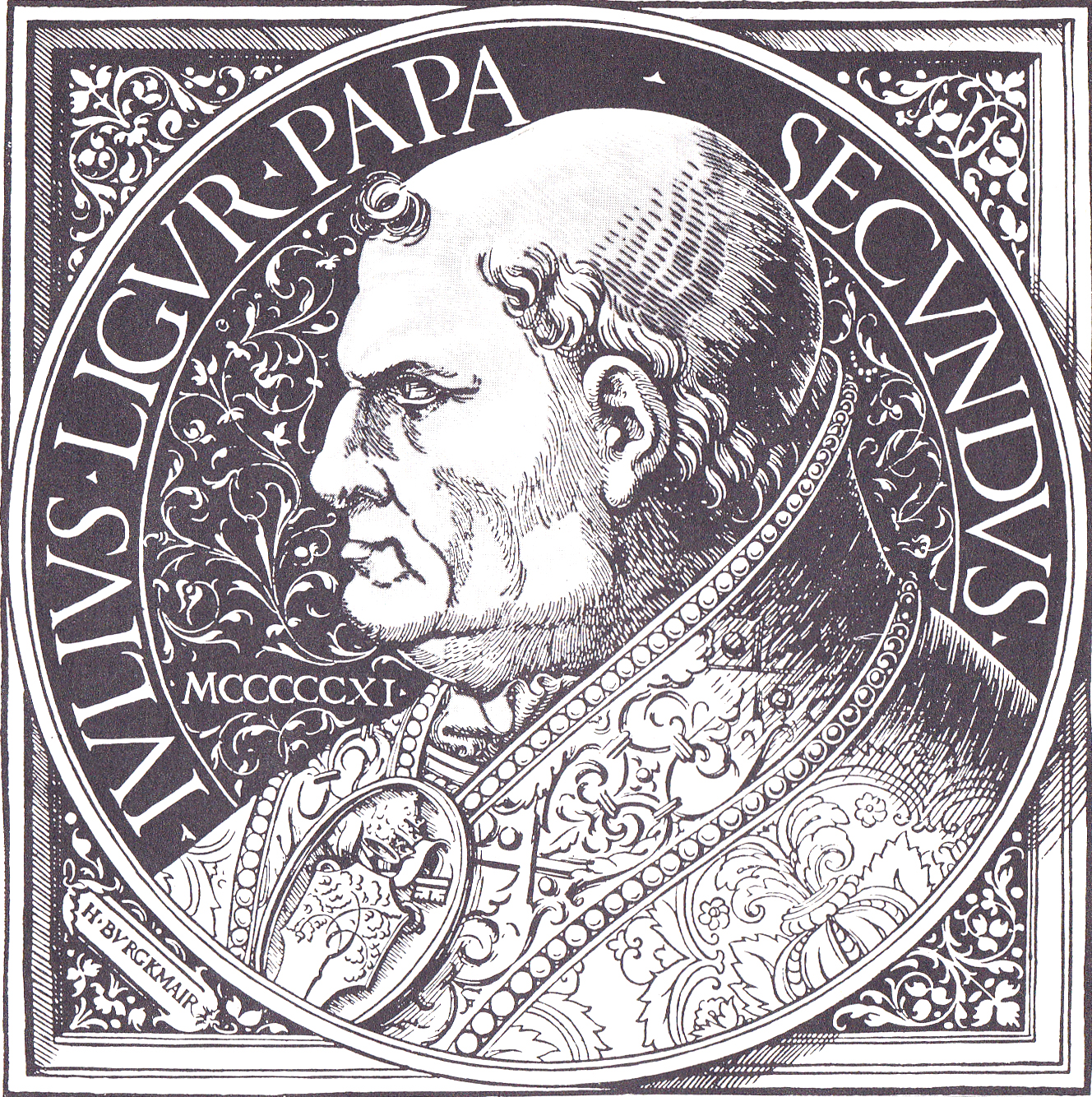
Woodcut by Hans Burgkmair

He joined an anti-Venetian League of Cambrai, formed in December 1508, with the goal of capturing the coast of Romagna from the Venetian Republic. Having achieved this goal during the early stages of the War of the League of Cambrai, he reconciled with Venice (1510) and formed the Holy League (1511) in order to eliminate the French presence in Italy. His main goal was now again to "expel the barbarians" (Fuori i Barbari!). Julius II brought King Ferdinand II of Aragon into the alliance, declaring Naples a papal fief and promising a formal investiture.

Having previously declared that the imperial election was sufficient for Maximilian to style himself as Holy Roman Emperor, he succeeded in distancing the emperor from the king of France. Julius II personally led the papal armed forces at the victorious Siege of Mirandola and, despite subsequent defeats and great losses at the Battle of Ravenna, he ultimately forced the French troops of Louis XII to retreat behind the Alps after the arrival of Swiss mercenaries from the Holy Roman Empire.

At the Congress of Mantua in 1512, Julius II ordered the restoration of Italian families to power in the vacuum of French rule: the Imperial Swiss, led by Massimiliano Sforza restored Sforza rule in Milan, and a Spanish army led by Giovanni de Medici restored Medici rule in Florence. The Venetians regained their territories lost to France, and the Papal States annexed Parma and Modena. The conciliarist movement promoted by foreign monarchs was crushed, and Julius II affirmed ultramontanism at the Fifth Lateran Council. This is often presented in traditional historiography as the moment in which Renaissance Italy came the closest to unification after the end of the Italic League of the 15th century. However, Julius II was far away from the possibility of forming a single Italian kingdom, if that was his goal at all, since foreign armies were largely involved in his wars and the French were preparing new campaigns against the Swiss for Milan. Naples, even if recognized as a papal fief, was still under Aragon, and in fact Julius II was planning to end Spanish presence in the south. Nevertheless, by the end of his pontificate, the papal objective to make the Church the main force in the Italian Wars was achieved. At the Roman Carnival of 1513, Julius II presented himself as the "liberator of Italy".

Julius planned to call for a crusade against the Ottoman Empire in order to retake Constantinople, but died before making official announcements. His successor, Pope Leo X, along with Emperor Maximilian, would re-establish the status quo ante bellum in Italy by ratifying the treaties of Brussels and Noyon in 1516; France regained control of Milan after the victory of Francis I at the Battle of Marignano.

== Early life ==
Giuliano della Rovere was born in Albisola near Savona in the Republic of Genoa. He was of the House of della Rovere, a noble but impoverished family, the son of Raffaello della Rovere (Note: The brother of Francesco della Rovere, later Pope Sixtus IV) and Theodora Manerola, a woman of Greek ancestry. He had three brothers: Bartolomeo, a Franciscan friar who then became Bishop of Ferrara (1474–1494); Leonardo; and Giovanni, Prefect of the City of Rome (1475–1501) and Prince of Sora and Senigallia. He also had a sister, Lucina (later the mother of Cardinal Sisto Gara della Rovere). Giuliano was educated by his uncle, Fr. Francesco della Rovere, O.F.M., among the Franciscans, who took him under his special charge. He was later sent by this same uncle (who by that time had become Minister General of the Franciscans (1464–1469)), to the Franciscan friary in Perugia, where he could study the sciences at the university.

Della Rovere, as a young man, showed traits of being rough, coarse and inclined to bad language. During the late 1490s, he became more closely acquainted with Cardinal de’ Medici and his cousin Giulio de’ Medici, both of whom would later become Pope, (i.e. Leo X and Clement VII, respectively). The two dynasties became uneasy allies in the context of papal politics. Both houses desired an end to the occupation of Italian lands by the armies of France. He seemed less enthused by theology; rather, Paul Strathern argues, his imagined heroes were military leaders such as Frederic Colonna.

== Cardinalate ==
Giuliano della Rovere (left, future Julius II), and Julius II's nephew, Clemente della Rovere (right), who safeguarded Giuliano's affairs while he fled to France following a dispute with Alexander VI

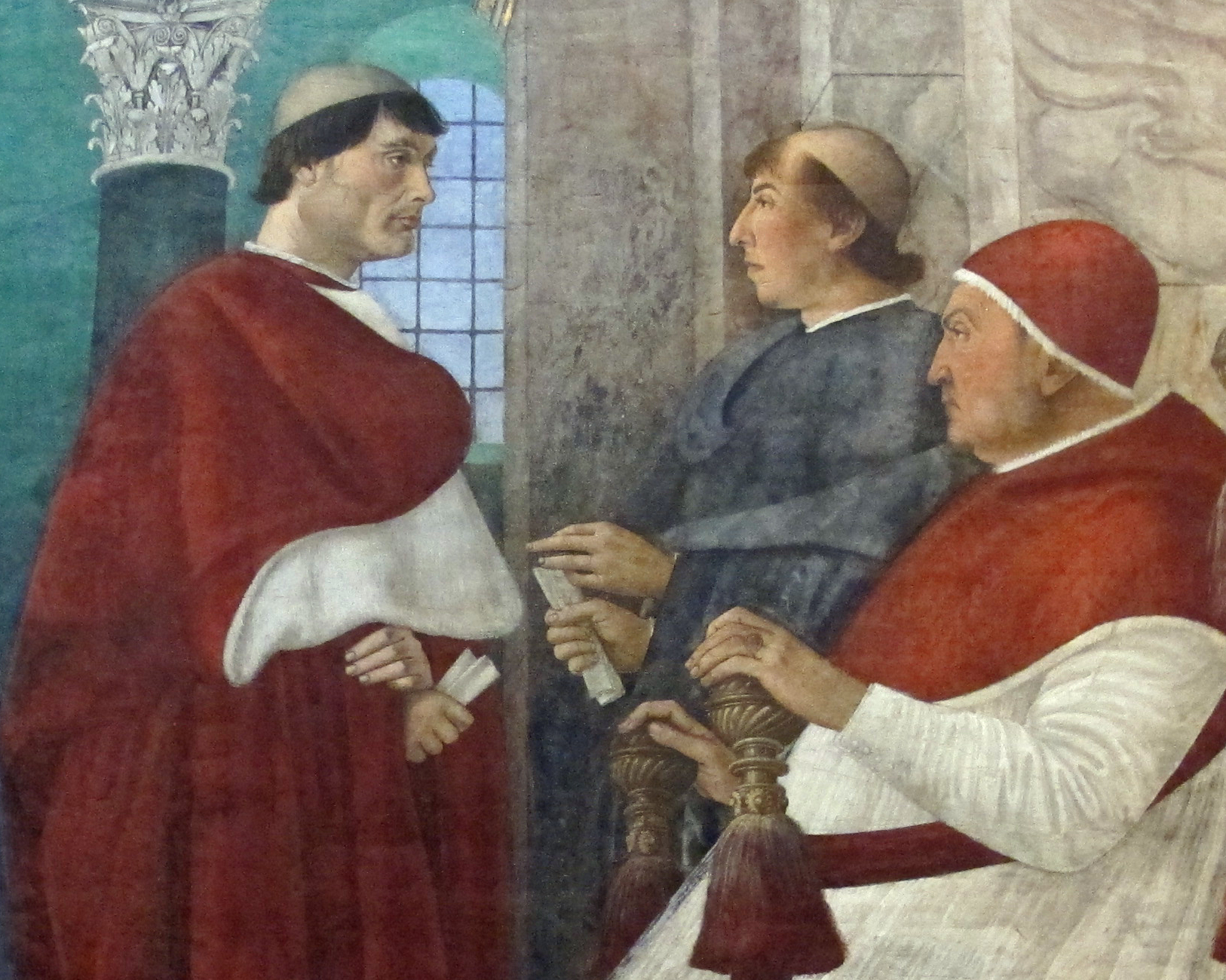
Giuliano della Rovere, as cardinal (left), with his uncle and patron Francesco della Rovere, Pope Sixtus IV (right)

After his uncle was elected Pope Sixtus IV on 10 August 1471, Giuliano was appointed Bishop of Carpentras in the Comtat Venaissin on 16 October 1471. In an act of overt nepotism, he was immediately raised to the cardinalate on 16 December 1471, and assigned the same titular church as that formerly held by his uncle, San Pietro in Vincoli. Guilty of serial simony and pluralism, he held several powerful offices at once: in addition to the archbishopric of Avignon he held no fewer than eight bishoprics, including Lausanne from 1472, Coutances (1476–1477), Catania (1473–1474).

In 1474, Giuliano led an army to Todi, Spoleto, and Città di Castello as papal legate. He returned to Rome in May in the company of Duke Federigo of Urbino, who promised his daughter in marriage to Giuliano's brother Giovanni, who was subsequently named Lord of Senigallia and of Mondovì. On 22 December 1475, Pope Sixtus IV created the new Archdiocese of Avignon, assigning to it as suffragan dioceses the Sees of Vaison, Cavaillon, and Carpentras. He appointed Giuliano as the first archbishop. Giuliano held the archdiocese until his later election to the papacy. In 1476, the office of Legate was added, and he left Rome for France in February. On 22 August 1476, he founded the Collegium de Ruvere in Avignon. He returned to Rome on 4 October 1476.

In 1479, Cardinal Giuliano served his one-year term as Chamberlain of the College of Cardinals. In this office he was responsible for collecting all the revenues owed to the cardinals as a group (from ad limina visits, for example) and for the proper disbursements of appropriate shares to cardinals who were in service in the Roman Curia.

Giuliano was again named Papal Legate to France on 28 April 1480, and left Rome on 9 June. As Legate, his mission was threefold: to make peace between King Louis XI and the Archduke Maximilian of Austria; to raise funds for a war against the Ottoman Turks; and to negotiate the release of Cardinal Jean Balue and Bishop Guillaume d'Haraucourt (who by then had been imprisoned by Louis for eleven years on charges of treason). He reached Paris in September, and finally, on 20 December 1480, Louis gave orders that Balue be handed over to the Archpriest of Loudun, who had been commissioned by the Legate to receive him in the name of the Pope. He returned to Rome on 3 February 1482. Shortly thereafter, the sum of 300,000 ecus of gold was received from the French in a subsidy for the war.

On 31 January 1483, Cardinal della Rovere was promoted suburbicarian Bishop of Ostia, in succession to Cardinal Guillaume d'Estouteville who had died on 22 January. It was the privilege of the Bishop of Ostia to consecrate an elected pope a bishop, if he were not already a bishop. This actually occurred in the case of Pius III (Francesco Todeschini-Piccolomini), who was ordained a priest on 30 September 1503 and consecrated a bishop on 1 October 1503 by Cardinal Giuliano della Rovere.

Around this time, in 1483, an illegitimate daughter was born to the cardinal and to Lucrezia Normanni, Felice della Rovere.

On 3 November 1483, Cardinal della Rovere was named Bishop of Bologna and Papal Legate, succeeding Cardinal Francesco Gonzaga, who had died on 21 October. He held the diocese until 1502. On 28 December 1484, Giuliano participated in the investiture of his brother Giovanni as Captain-General of the Papal Armies by Pope Innocent VIII.

By 1484, Giuliano was living in the new palazzo, which he had constructed next to the Basilica of the Twelve Apostles, which he had also restored. Pope Sixtus IV paid a formal visit to the newly restored building on 1 May 1482, and it may be that Giuliano was already in residence then.

=== War with Naples ===
Sixtus IV died on 12 August 1484 and was succeeded by Innocent VIII. After the ceremonies of the election of Pope Innocent were completed, the cardinals were dismissed to their own homes, but Cardinal della Rovere accompanied the new Pope to the Vatican Palace and was the only one to remain with him. Ludwig Pastor quotes the Florentine ambassador as remarking, "[Pope Innocent] gives the impression of a man who is guided rather by the advice of others than by his own lights." The ambassador of Ferrara stated, "While with his uncle [Della Rovere] had not the slightest influence, he now obtains whatever he likes from the new Pope." Della Rovere was one of the five cardinals named to the committee to make the arrangements for the Coronation.

In 1485 Pope Innocent and Cardinal della Rovere (as the Pope's new principal advisor) decided to involve themselves in the political affairs of the Kingdom of Naples, in what was called the Conspiracy of the Barons. On Palm Sunday, 20 March, Cardinal della Rovere, concealing his activities from his principal rival, Cardinal Rodrigo Borgia (later Pope Alexander VI), rode out of Rome and departed by sea from Ostia, intending to head for Genoa and Avignon to prepare to wage war between the Church and the King of Naples, Ferdinand I (Ferrante). On 28 June, the Pope sent back to Naples the token gift of a palfrey which symbolized the King of Naples' submission and demanded the full feudal submission of the Kingdom of Naples to the Roman Church according to long-standing tradition. In a second attempt to overthrow the Aragonese monarchy, the Prince of Salerno Antonello II di Sanseverino, on the advice of Antonello Petrucci and Francesco Coppola, gathered together several feudal families belonging to the Guelph faction and supporting the Angevin claim to Naples. Antonello de Sanseverino was the brother-in-law of Cardinal della Rovere's brother Giovanni, who was a noble of Naples because of his fief of Sora. The principal complaints of the barons were the heavy taxation imposed by Ferdinand to finance his war against the Ottomans, who had occupied Bari in 1480; and the vigorous efforts of Ferrante to centralize the administrative apparatus of the kingdom, moving it away from a feudal to a bureaucratic system. The barons seized L'Aquila and appealed to the Pope for assistance as their feudal overlord. Genoa and Venice supported the Papacy, while Florence and Milan opted for Naples. In Rome, the Orsini family allied themselves with Ferrante's son Alfonso, and therefore their rivals the Colonna family supported the Pope in the street fighting that ensued. Ferrante reacted by seizing the fiefs of the barons, and, when the two parties met to negotiate a settlement, Ferrante had them arrested, and eventually executed. The prestige of the della Rovere family was seriously damaged, and in an attempt to exculpate himself, Pope Innocent began to withdraw his support for them. Peace was restored in 1487, but Innocent VIII's papacy was discredited.

=== Papal ambassador ===
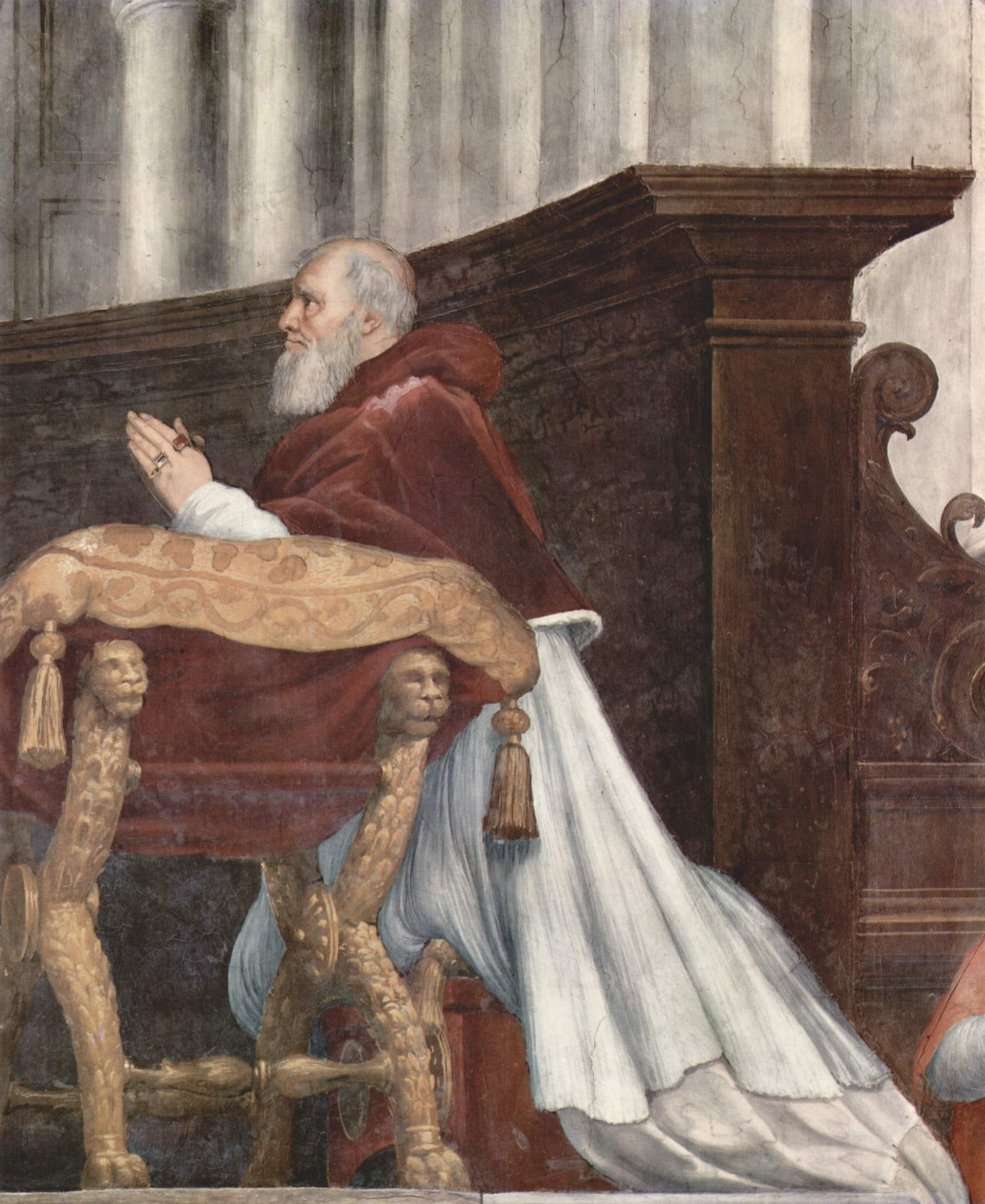
Julius by Raphael, in the Mass at Bolsena

On 23 March 1486, the pope sent Giuliano as Papal Legate to the Court of King Charles VIII of France to ask for help. A French entourage arrived in Rome on 31 May, but immediately relations broke down with the pro-Spanish Cardinal Borgia. But Ferrante's army decided on the pope's humiliation, Innocent backed down, and on 10 August, he signed a treaty. Innocent looked for new allies and settled on the Republic of Florence.

On 2 March 1487, Giuliano was appointed legate in the March of Ancona and to the Republic of Venice. He encouraged trade with the sizable Turkish community at these ports. But urgent reports arrived from King Matthias Corvinus of Hungary that the Ottoman Sultan Bayezid II was threatening Italy. He returned on 8 April 1488, and again took up his residence in the Palazzo Colonna next to the Basilica of the XII Apostles.

=== Conclave of 1492 ===
In the Conclave of 1492, following the death of Innocent VIII, Cardinal della Rovere was supported for election by both King Charles VIII of France and by Charles' enemy King Ferrante of Naples. It was reported that France had deposited 200,000 ducats into a bank account to promote della Rovere's candidature, while the Republic of Genoa had deposited 100,000 ducats to the same end. Della Rovere, however, had enemies, both because of the influence he had exercised over Pope Sixtus IV and because of his French sympathies. His rivals included Cardinal Ardicio della Porta and Cardinal Ascanio Sforza, both patronized by the Milanese. Kellogg, Baynes & Smith, continue, a "rivalry had, however, gradually grown up between [della Rovere] and [then-Cardinal] Rodrigo Borgia, and on the death of Innocent VIII in 1492 Borgia by means of a secret agreement and simony with Ascanio Sforza succeeded in being elected by a large majority, under the name of Pope Alexander VI." Della Rovere, jealous and angry, hated Borgia for being elected over him.

On 31 August 1492, the new Pope, Alexander VI, held a consistory in which he named six cardinal legates, one of whom was Giuliano della Rovere, who was appointed Legate in Avignon. Cardinal Giuliano was increasingly alarmed by the powerful position assumed by Cardinal Ascanio Sforza and the Milanese faction in the Court of Alexander VI, and after Christmas Day in December 1492 chose to withdraw to his fortress in the town and diocese of Ostia, at the mouth of the Tiber River. In that same month, Federico of Altamura, the second son of King Ferdinando (Ferrante) of Naples, was in Rome to pay homage to the new pope, and he reported back to his father that Alexander and Cardinal Sforza were working on establishing new alliances, which would upset Ferrante's security arrangements. Ferrante, therefore, decided to use della Rovere as the centre of an anti-Sforza party at the papal court, a prospect made easier since Ferrante had prudently repaired his relations with Cardinal Giuliano after the War of the Barons. He also warned King Ferdinand and Queen Isabella of Spain that Alexander was intriguing with the French, which brought an immediate visit of a Spanish ambassador to the Pope. In June, Federico of Altamura was back in Rome and held conversations with della Rovere, assuring him of Neapolitan protection. On 24 July 1493, Cardinal della Rovere returned to Rome (despite the warnings of Virginio Orsini) and dined with the Pope.

=== Charles VIII and the French war over Naples ===
Della Rovere was at once determined to take refuge from Borgia's wrath at Ostia. On 23 April 1494, the Cardinal took ship, having placed his fortress at Ostia in the hands of his brother Giovanni della Rovere, and travelled to Genoa and then to Avignon. He was summoned by King Charles VIII to Lyons, where the two met on 1 June 1494. He made an agreement with Charles VIII, who undertook to take Italy back from the Borgias by military force. The King entered Rome with his army on 31 December 1494, with Giuliano della Rovere riding on one side and Cardinal Ascanio Sforza riding on the other. The King made several demands of Pope Alexander, one of which was that the Castel Sant'Angelo be turned over to French forces. This Pope Alexander refused to do, claiming that Cardinal della Rovere would occupy it and become master of Rome. Charles soon conquered Naples, making his triumphal entry on 22 February 1495, but he was forced to remove most of his army. As he was returning to the north, his army was defeated at the Battle of Fornovo on 5 July 1495, and his Italian adventure came to an end. The last remnants of the French invasion were gone by November 1496. Ostia, however, remained in French hands until March 1497, causing difficulties in the provisioning of the city of Rome.

Back in Lyon in 1496, Charles VIII and Giuliano della Rovere were planning another war. Giuliano was travelling back and forth from Lyon to Avignon, raising troops. It was being reported in France by June 1496, moreover, that King Charles intended to have a papal election in France and to have Cardinal della Rovere elected pope.

In March 1497, Pope Alexander deprived Cardinal della Rovere of his benefices as an enemy of the Apostolic See, and Giovanni della Rovere of the Prefecture of Rome. His action against the Cardinal was done not only without the consent of the cardinals in consistory, but in fact over their vigorous objections. By June, however, the Pope was in negotiations with the Cardinal for reconciliation and return to Rome. His benefices were restored to him after an apparent reconciliation with the Pope in August 1498.

=== Louis XII and his Italian War ===
King Charles VIII of France, the last of the senior branch of the House of Valois, died on 7 April 1498 after accidentally striking his head on the lintel of a door at the Château d'Amboise. When Cesare Borgia passed through southern France in October 1498 on his way to meet King Louis XII for his investiture as Duke of Valentinois, he stopped in Avignon and was magnificently entertained by Cardinal della Rovere. They then moved on to meet the King at Chinon, where Cesare Borgia fulfilled one of the terms of the treaty between Louis and Alexander by producing the red hat of a cardinal, which had been promised for the Archbishop of Rouen, Georges d'Amboise. It was Cardinal della Rovere, the Papal Legate, who placed the hat on Amboise's head.

Louis wanted an annulment from Queen Joan so he could marry Anne of Brittany, in the hope of annexing the Duchy of Brittany; Alexander, in turn, wanted a French princess as wife for Cesare. Della Rovere, who was trying to repair his relations with the House of Borgia, was also involved in another clause of the treaty, the marriage between Cesare Borgia and Carlotta, the daughter of the King of Naples, who had been brought up at the French Court. Della Rovere was in favour of the marriage, but, according to Pope Alexander, King Louis XII was not, and, most especially, Carlotta was stubbornly refusing her consent. Alexander's plan of securing a royal throne for his son fell through, and he was very angry. Louis offered Cesare another of his relatives, the "beautiful and rich" Charlotte d'Albret, whom Cesare married at Blois on 13 May 1499.

The marriage produced a complete volta facie in Pope Alexander. He became an open partisan of the French and Venice, and accepted their goal, the destruction of the Sforza hold on Milan. On 14 July, Cardinal Ascanio Sforza, della Rovere's sworn enemy, fled Rome with all his property and friends. Meanwhile, the French army crossed the Alps and captured Alessandria in Piedmont. On 1 September 1499, Lodovico Il Moro fled Milan, and on 6 September the city surrendered to the French. Cardinal Giuliano was in the King's entourage when he entered Milan on 6 October.

Pope Alexander then turned his attention, stimulated by the Venetians, to the threat of the Ottoman Turks. In the autumn of 1499, he called for a crusade and sought aid and money from all Christendom. The rulers of Europe paid little attention, but to show his sincerity, Alexander imposed a tithe on all the residents of the Papal States and a tithe on the clergy of the entire world. A list of cardinals and their incomes, drawn up for the occasion, shows that Cardinal della Rovere was the second-richest cardinal, with an annual income of 20,000 ducats.

Another break in relations between Pope Alexander and Cardinal Giuliano came at the end of 1501 or the beginning of 1502, when Giuliano was transferred from the Bishopric of Bologna to the diocese of Vercelli.

On 21 June 1502, Pope Alexander sent his secretary, Francesco Troche (Trochia), and Cardinal Amanieu d'Albret (brother-in-law of Cesare Borgia) to Savona to seize Cardinal della Rovere by stealth and bring him back to Rome as quickly as possible and turn him over to the Pope. The kidnapping party returned to Rome on 12 July, without having accomplished its mission. On 20 July 1502, Cardinal Giovanni Battista Ferrari died in his rooms at the Vatican Palace; he had been poisoned, and his property was claimed by the Borgia. On 3 January 1503, Cardinal Orsini was arrested and sent to the Castel Sant'Angelo; on 22 February, he died there, poisoned on the orders of Alexander VI.

== Election ==
A veteran of the Sacred College, della Rovere had won influence for the election of Pope Pius III with the help of Florentine ruler, Lorenzo de' Medici. In spite of a violent temper, della Rovere succeeded by dexterous diplomacy in winning the support of Cesare Borgia, whom he won over by his promise of money and continued papal backing for Borgia's policies in the Romagna. This election was, in Ludwig von Pastor's view, certainly achieved by means of bribery with money, but also with promises. "Giuliano, whom the popular voice seemed to indicate as the only possible pope, was as unscrupulous as any of his colleagues in the means which he employed. Where promises and persuasions were unavailing, he did not hesitate to have recourse to bribery." Indeed, his election on 1 November 1503 took only a few hours, and the only two votes he did not receive were his own and the one of Georges d'Amboise, his most vigorous opponent and the favourite of the French monarchy. In the end, as in all papal elections, the vote was made unanimous after the leading candidate had achieved the required number of votes for election.

== A Renaissance pope ==
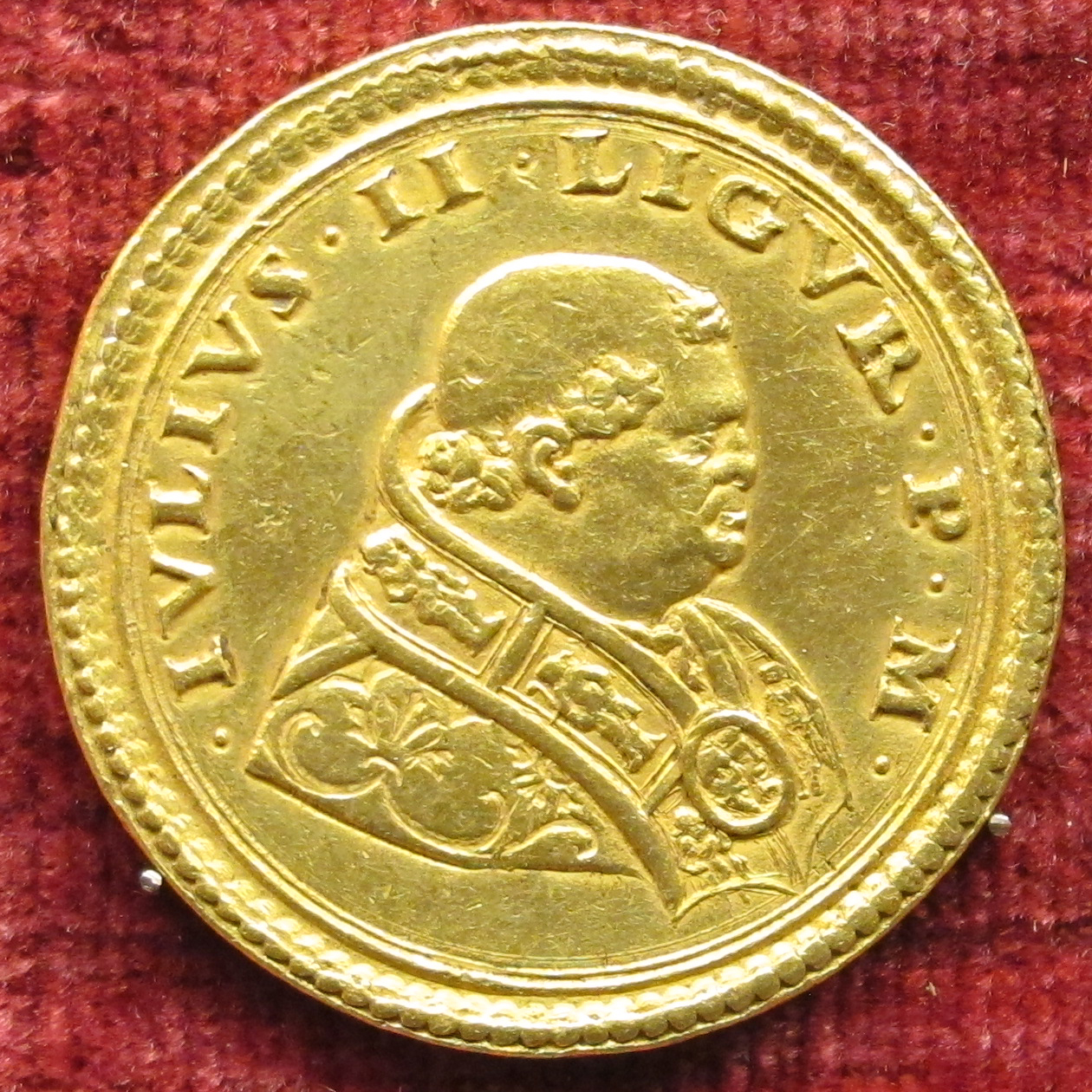
Medal in gold, by Pier Maria Serbaldi da Pescia

Giuliano della Rovere took the name Julius, only used by a single fourth-century predecessor, Julius I, and was pope for nine years, from 1503 to 1513. From the beginning, Julius II set out to defeat the various powers that challenged his temporal authority; in a series of complicated stratagems, he first succeeded in rendering it impossible for the Borgias to retain their power over the Papal States. Indeed, on the day of his election, he issued a damnatio memoriae, declaring:

I will not live in the same rooms as the Borgias lived. He [Alexander VI] desecrated the Holy Church as none before. He usurped the papal power by the devil's aid, and I forbid under the pain of excommunication anyone to speak or think of Borgia again. His name and memory must be forgotten. It must be crossed out of every document and memorial. His reign must be obliterated. All paintings made of the Borgias or for them must be covered over with black crepe. All the tombs of the Borgias must be opened and their bodies sent back to where they belong – to Spain.

Others indicate that his decision was taken on 26 November 1507, not in 1503. The Borgia Apartments were turned to other uses. The Sala de Papi was redecorated by two pupils of Raphael by order of Pope Leo X. The rooms were used to accommodate Emperor Charles V on his visit to the Vatican after the Sack of Rome (1527), and subsequently, they became the residence of the Cardinal-nephew and then the Cardinal Secretary of State.

Julius used his influence to reconcile two powerful Roman families, the Orsini and Colonna. Decrees were made in the interests of the Roman nobility, in whose shoes the new pope now stepped. Being thus secure in Rome and the surrounding country, he set himself the task to expel the Republic of Venice from Faenza, Rimini, and the other towns and fortresses of Italy which it occupied after the death of Pope Alexander. In 1504, finding it impossible to succeed with the Doge of Venice by remonstrance, he brought about a union of the conflicting interests of France and the Holy Roman Empire, and sacrificed temporarily to some extent the independence of Italy to conclude with them an offensive and defensive alliance against Venice. The combination was, however, at first little more than nominal, and was not immediately effective in compelling the Venetians to deliver up more than a few unimportant places in the Romagna. With a campaign in 1506, he personally led an army to Perugia and Bologna, freeing the two papal cities from their despots, Gian Paolo Baglioni and Giovanni II Bentivoglio.

In December 1503, Julius issued a dispensation allowing the future Henry VIII of England to marry Catherine of Aragon; Catherine had previously been briefly married to Henry's older brother Prince Arthur, who had died, but Henry later argued that she had remained a virgin for the five months of the marriage. Some twenty years later, when Henry was attempting to wed Anne Boleyn (since his son by Catherine of Aragon survived only a few days, and two of her sons were stillborn, and therefore he had no male heir), he sought to have his marriage annulled, claiming that the dispensation of Pope Julius should never have been issued. The retraction of the dispensation was refused by Pope Clement VII.

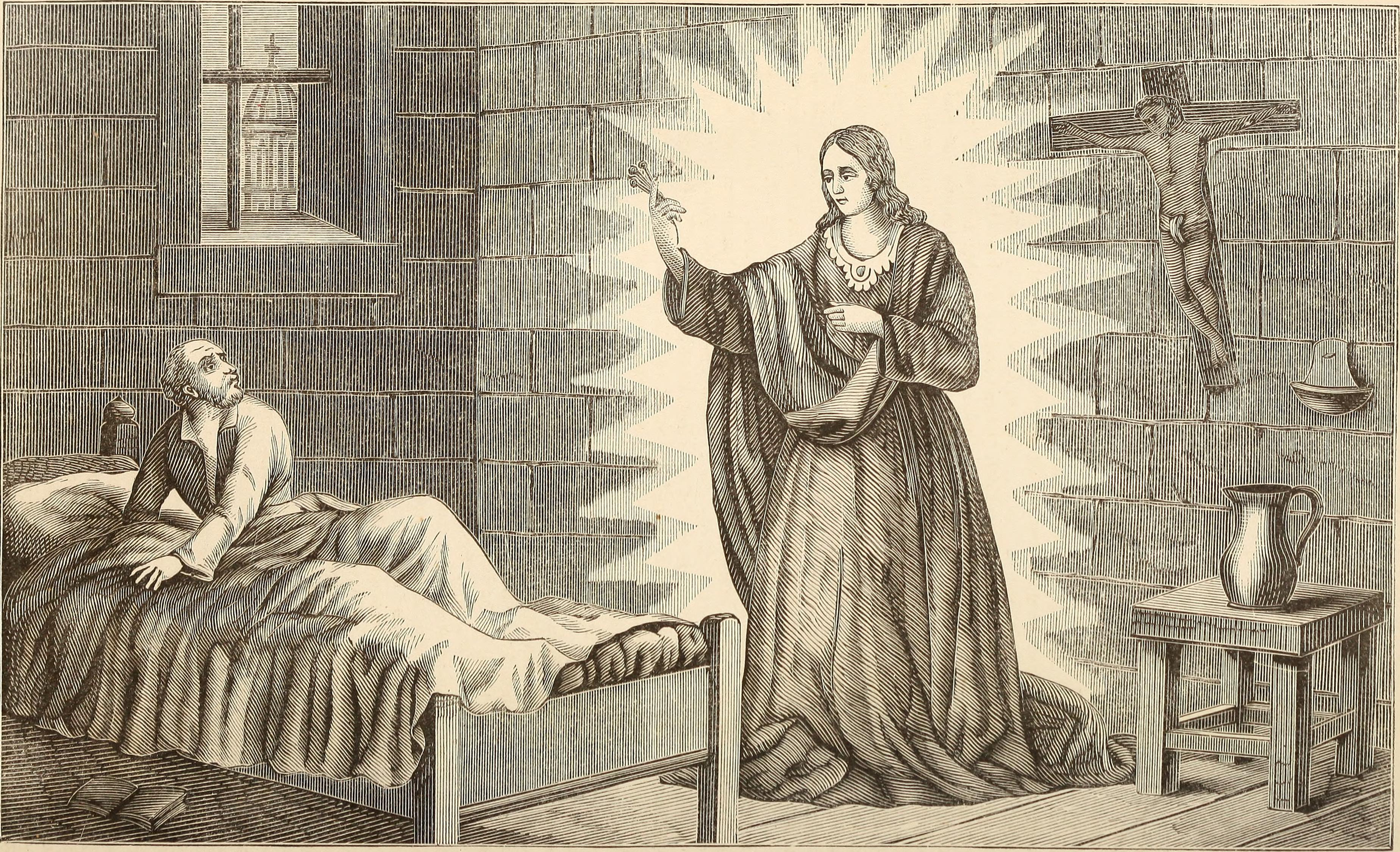
Jetzer being tricked. Jetzer was a Dominican friar in Bern, and some of his brothers tricked him into thinking he was receiving a revelation from the Virgin Mary. Eventually, he figured it out. In punishment for this scandal, four Dominicans were burned at the stake under the orders of Pope Julius II with an audience of 30,000 people on 1 May 1509.

The Bull entitled Ea quae pro bono pacis, issued on 24 January 1506, confirmed papal approval of the mare clausum policy being pursued by Spain and Portugal amid their explorations, and approved the changes of the 1494 Treaty of Tordesillas to previous papal bulls. In the same year, Julius II founded the Swiss Guard to provide a constant corps of soldiers to protect the pope. As part of the Renaissance program of reestablishing the glory of antiquity for the Christian capital, Rome, Julius II took considerable effort to present himself as a sort of emperor-pope, capable of leading a Latin-Christian empire. On Palm Sunday, 1507, "Julius II entered Rome ... both as a second Julius Caesar, heir to the majesty of Rome's imperial glory, and in the likeness of Christ, whose vicar the pope was, and who in that capacity governed the universal Roman Church." Julius, who modeled himself after his namesake Caesar, would personally lead his army across the Italian peninsula under the imperial war-cry, "Drive out the barbarians." Yet, despite the imperial rhetoric, the campaigns were highly localized. Perugia voluntarily surrendered in March 1507 to direct control, as it had always been within the Papal States; it was in these endeavors he had enlisted French mercenaries.

Urbino's magnificent Ducal Palace was infiltrated by French soldiers in the pay of the Margrave of Mantua; the Montefeltro Conspiracy against his loyal cousins earned the occupying armies the Pope's undying hatred. Julius relied upon Guidobaldo's help to raise his nephew and heir Francesco Maria della Rovere; the intricate web of nepotism helped secure the Italian Papacy. Moreover, the Pope's interest in Urbino was widely known in the French court. Julius left a spy at the Urbino Palace, possibly Galeotto Franciotti della Rovere, Cardinal of San Pietro, to watch the Mantua stables in total secret; the secular progress of the Papal Curia was growing in authority and significance. In Rome, the Pope watched from his private chapel to see how his court behaved. This was an age of Renaissance conspiracy.

=== League of Cambrai and Holy League ===
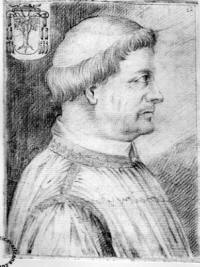
Leonardo Grosso della Rovere, the fourth Cardinal-nephew of Julius II, accompanied him on his military campaigns in Bologna and Perugia, and served as his ambassador to France.

In addition to an active military policy, the new pope personally led troops into battle on at least two occasions, the first to expel Giovanni Bentivoglio from Bologna (17 August 1506 – 23 March 1507), which was achieved successfully with the assistance of the Duchy of Urbino. The second was an attempt to recover the Duchy of Ferrara for the Papal States (1 September 1510 – 29 June 1512). In 1508, Julius was fortuitously able to form the League of Cambrai with King Louis XII of France, Maximilian I, Holy Roman Emperor (proclaimed without coronation as emperor by Pope Julius II at Trent in 1508) and King Ferdinand II of Aragon. The League fought against the Republic of Venice. (Note: Also known as the "War of the League of Cambrai") Among other things, Julius wanted possession of Venetian Romagna; Emperor Maximilian I wanted Friuli and Veneto; Louis XII wanted Cremona, and Ferdinand II desired the Apulian ports. This war was a conflict in what was collectively known as the "Italian Wars". In the spring of 1509, the Republic of Venice was placed under an interdict by Julius, In May 1509 Julius sent troops to fight against the Venetians who had occupied parts of the Romagna, winning back the Papal States in the decisive Battle of Agnadello near Cremona.

The achievements of the League soon outstripped the primary intention of Julius. In one single battle, the Battle of Agnadello on 14 May 1509, the dominion of Venice in Italy was practically lost to the pope. Neither the King of France nor the Holy Roman Emperor was satisfied with merely effecting the purposes of the Pope; the latter found it necessary to enter into an arrangement with the Venetians to defend himself from those who immediately before had been his allies. The Venetians, on making humble submission, were absolved at the beginning of 1510, and shortly afterward France was placed under papal interdict.

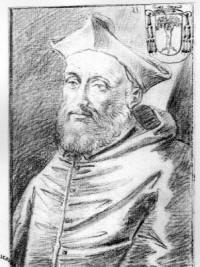
Sisto Gara della Rovere, the fifth cardinal nephew of Julius II, was the Prior in Rome of the Knights Hospitaller of Malta.

Attempts to cause a rupture between France and England proved unsuccessful; on the other hand, at a synod convened by Louis at Tours in September 1510, the French bishops withdrew from papal obedience and resolved, with the Emperor's co-operation, to seek dethronement of the pope. With some courage, Julius marched his army to Bologna and then against the French to Mirandola. In November 1511, a council met at Pisa, called by rebel cardinals with support from the French king and the Empire; they demanded the deposition of Julius II. He refused to shave, showing utter contempt for the hated French occupation. "per vendicarsi et diceva ... anco fuora scazato el re Ludovico Franza d'Italia."

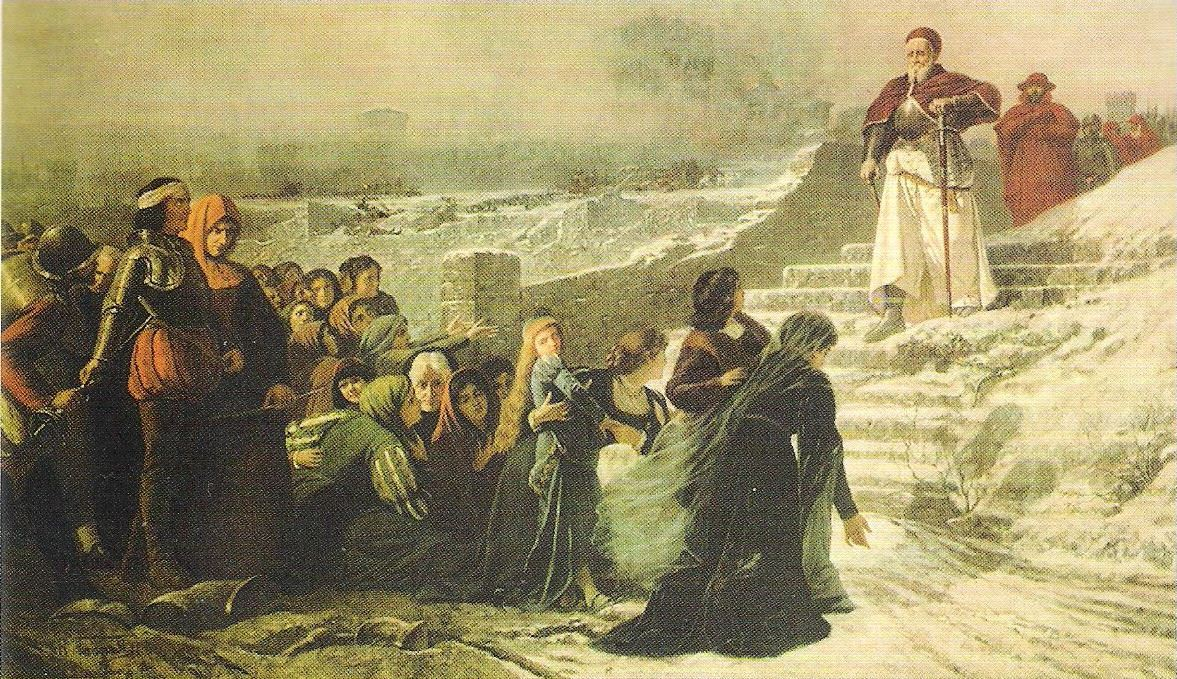
Pope Julius II on the walls of the conquered city of Mirandola (oil on canvas by Raffaello Tancredi, 1890, City Hall of Mirandola)

On 4 October 1511, Julius succeeded in creating the anti-French Holy League, which also included the Venetians and King Ferdinand II of Aragon. In a short time, King Henry VIII of England also joined the Holy League, unlike Emperor Maximilian, who was still reluctant to break his alliance with the French king. Ferdinand of Aragon was invested of Naples as a papal fief, and on 6 April 1512, by the Pope's mediation, the truce was concluded in Rome between the emperor and the Venetians. Maximilian ratified the truce on 20 May, thus ending his participation in the anti-Venetian war, but still avoiding the Pope's proposals to officially join the anti-French Holy League.

Julius II regarded France as the main foreign power in the Italian peninsula, hostile to Papal interests. Louis XII defeated the alliance at Battle of Ravenna on 11 April 1512. When a desperate battle felled over 20,000 men in a bloodbath, the Pope commanded his protege, a newly released young Cardinal Medici, to retake Florence with a Spanish army. The rescue of the city on 1 September 1512 saved Rome from another invasion, ousting Piero Soderini, and returning the dynastic rule of the Medici. Julius had seemingly restored fortuna or control by exercising his manly vertu, just as Machiavelli wrote. This reasserted a strong relation between Florence and Rome, a lasting legacy of Julius II. Yet Machiavelli and his methods would not outlast Julius' Papacy.

Julius hired Swiss mercenaries to fight against the French in Milan in May 1512, causing the French army to withdraw across the Alps into Savoy. The papacy gained control of Parma and Piacenza in central Italy. With the French out of Italy, a Congress was held in Mantua by Julius II to declare the liberation of the peninsula. Nevertheless, although Julius had centralized and expanded the Papal States, he was far from realizing his dream of an independent Italian kingdom. Italy was not at peace either. The French were preparing new campaigns to reconquer Milan, and Julius II confessed to a Venetian ambassador a plan to invest his counsellor Luigi d'Aragona with the Kingdom of Naples in order to end Spanish presence in the south.

On 10 November 1512, the Pope proposed the conclusion of a final and comprehensive peace treaty between the emperor Maximilian and the Venetians, which would resolve the ongoing political conflicts by favouring Maximilian's interests in northern Italy, mainly at the Venetian expense. Finding the Pope's peace proposals too demanding and also excessively favorable towards the emperor, particularly in the contested regions of Terraferma, the Venetian government decided on 23 December (1512) to initiate peace negotiations with the king of France, thus laying foundation for a major shift in alliances.

The Pope did not live to see the result of those negotiations, since he died on 21 February 1513, and already on 23 March of the same year, a Franco-Venetian treaty was signed at Blois, thus marking the collapse of the Holy League.

=== Lateran Council ===
In May 1512, a general or ecumenical council, the Fifth Council of the Lateran, was held in Rome. According to an oath taken on his election to observe the Electoral Capitulations of the Conclave of October 1503, Julius had sworn to summon a general council, but it had been delayed, he affirmed, because of the occupation of Italy by his enemies. The real stimulus came from a false council which took place in 1511, later called the Conciliabulum Pisanum, inspired by Louis XII and Maximilian I as a tactic to weaken Julius, threatening to depose him. Julius' reply was the issuing of the bull Non-sini gravi of 18 July 1511, which fixed the date of 19 April 1512 for the opening of his own council. The Council actually convened on 3 May 1512, and Paris de Grassis reports that the crowd at the basilica was estimated at 50,000. It held its first working session on 10 May. In the third plenary session, on 3 December 1512, Julius attended, though ill; but he wanted to witness and receive the formal adhesion of Emperor Maximilian to the Lateran Council and his repudiation of the Conciliabulum Pisanum. This was one of Julius' great triumphs. The Pope was again in attendance at the fourth session on 10 December, this time to hear the accrediting of the Venetian Ambassador as the Serene Republic's representative at the council; he then had the letter of King Louis XI (of 27 November 1461), in which he announced the revocation of the Pragmatic Sanction, read out to the assembly, and demanded that all persons who accepted the Pragmatic Sanction appear before the Council within sixty days to justify their conduct. This was directed against the current French King Louis XII.

The fifth session was held on 16 February, but Pope Julius was too ill to attend. Cardinal Raffaele Riario, the Dean of the College of Cardinals and Bishop of Ostia, presided. The Bishop of Como, Scaramuccia Trivulzio, then read from the pulpit a papal bull, Si summus rerum, dated that very day and containing within its text the complete bull of 14 January 1505, Cum tam divino. The bull was submitted to the Council fathers for their consideration and ratification. Julius wanted to remind everyone of his legislation on papal conclaves, in particular against simony, and to fix his regulations firmly in canon law so that they could not be dispensed or ignored. Julius was fully aware that his death was imminent and wished to establish a major reform in his final days. Though he had been a witness to a good deal of simony at papal conclaves and had been a practitioner himself, he was determined to stamp out this abuse. The reading of the bull Cum tam divino became a regular feature of the first day of every conclave.

== Death ==
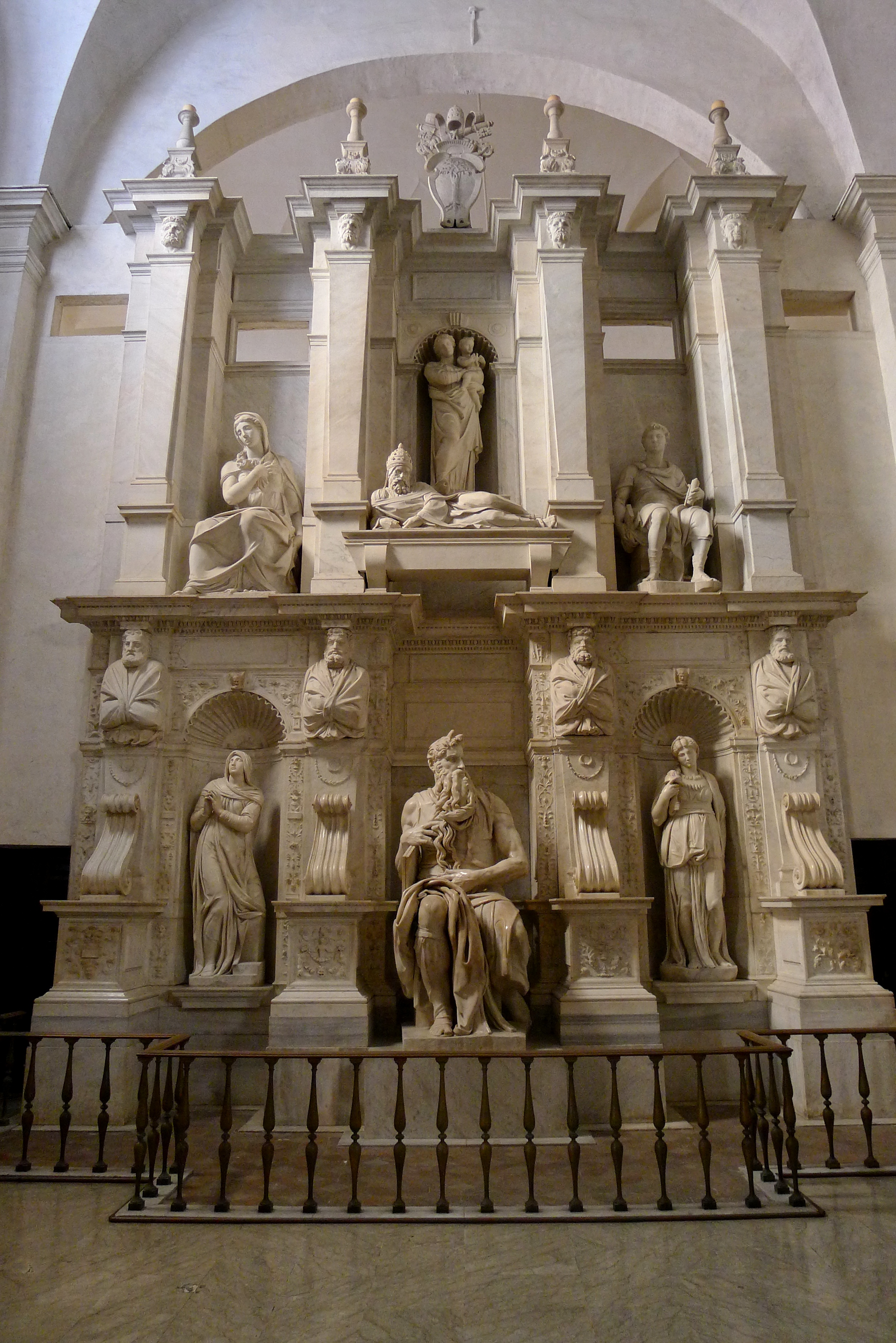
The monument of Julius II, with Michelangelo's statues of Moses, with Rachel and Leah

On the Vigil of Pentecost in May 1512, Pope Julius, aware that he was seriously ill and that his health was failing, despite comments on the part of some cardinals about how well he looked, remarked to Paris de Grassis, "They are flattering me; I know better; my strength diminishes from day to day and I cannot live much longer. Therefore, I beg you not to expect me at Vespers or at Mass from henceforth." Nonetheless, he continued his restless activities, including Masses, visits to churches, and audiences. On the morning of 24 June, Paris found the Pope to be very weak. On Christmas Eve, Julius ordered Paris to summon the College of Cardinals and the Sacristan of the Apostolic Palace, since he was so ill that he did not expect to be able to stay alive very long. From then until 6 January, he was confined to bed, and most of the time with a fever; he had lost his appetite, but the doctors were unable to diagnose his languor. On 4 February, he had an extensive conversation with Paris concerning the arrangements for his funeral.

Pope Julius was reported to be seriously ill in a dispatch received in Venice on 10 February 1513. He received Holy Communion and was granted the plenary indulgence on the morning of 19 February, according to the Venetian Ambassador. On the 20th, according to Paris de Grassis, he received Holy Communion from the hands of Cardinal Raffaele Riario, the Camerlengo. He died of a fever on the night of 20–21 February 1513.

On the evening of 21 February, Paris de Grassis conducted the funeral of Julius II, even though the Canons of the Vatican Basilica and the beneficiati refused to cooperate. The body was placed for a time at the Altar of Saint Andrew in the Basilica and was then carried by the Imperial Ambassador, the papal Datary, and two of Paris' assistants to the altar of the Chapel of Pope Sixtus, where the Vicar of the Vatican Basilica performed the final absolution. At the third hour of the evening, the body was laid in a sepulchre between the altar and the wall of the tribune.

Despite the fact that the so-called "Tomb of Pope Julius II" by Michelangelo is in San Pietro in Vincoli in Rome, Julius is in fact buried in St. Peter's Basilica. Michelangelo's tomb was not completed until 1545 and represents a much-abbreviated version of the planned original, which was initially intended for the new St. Peter's Basilica. His remains lay alongside his uncle, Pope Sixtus IV, but were later desecrated during the Sack of Rome in 1527. Today, both men lie in St. Peter's Basilica on the floor in front of the monument to Pope Clement X. A simple marble tombstone marks the site. Julius II was succeeded by Pope Leo X.

== Legacy ==
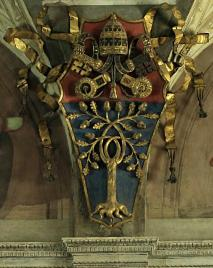
Coat of arms of Julius II in the Sistine Chapel

=== Patronage of the arts ===
In 1484 Cardinal Giuliano della Rovere had begun negotiations to persuade Marquis Francesco Gonzaga of Mantua to allow Andrea Mantegna to come to Rome, which finally bore fruit in 1488; Mantegna was given the commission to decorate the chapel of the Belvedere for Pope Innocent VIII, on which he spent two years.

Beyond Julius II's political and military achievements, he enjoys a title to honour in his patronage of art, architecture, and literature. He did much to improve and beautify the city.

Early in his papacy, Julius decided to revive the plan for replacing the dilapidated Constantinian basilica of St. Peter's. The idea was not his, but originally that of Pope Nicholas V, who had commissioned designs from Bernardo Rossellino. In the competition for a building plan, the design of Rossellino was immediately rejected as being out of date. A second design was submitted by Giuliano da Sangallo, an old friend of Julius, who had worked on several projects for him before, including the palazzo at S. Pietro in Vincoli, and who had left Rome with Julius when he fled the wrath of Alexander VI in 1495. Through Cardinal della Rovere, Sangallo had presented Charles VIII a plan for a palace, and in 1496 he had made a tour of the architectural monuments of Provence, returning to his native Florence in 1497. His proposals for S. Peter's, however, were not accepted despite what he believed to be a promise, and he retired in anger to Florence.

On 18 April 1506, Pope Julius II laid the foundation stone of the new St. Peter's Basilica for the successful architect, Donato Bramante. However, he also began the demolition of the old St. Peter's Basilica, which had stood for more than 1,100 years. He was a friend and patron of Bramante and Raphael, and a patron of Michelangelo. Several of Michelangelo's greatest works (including the painting of the ceiling of the Sistine Chapel) were commissioned by Julius. In the framework of Rome's urban renewal (Renovatio Romae), the pope commissioned Bramante to create two new straight streets respectively on the left and right bank of the Tiber: the Via Giulia and the Via della Lungara.

=== Character ===
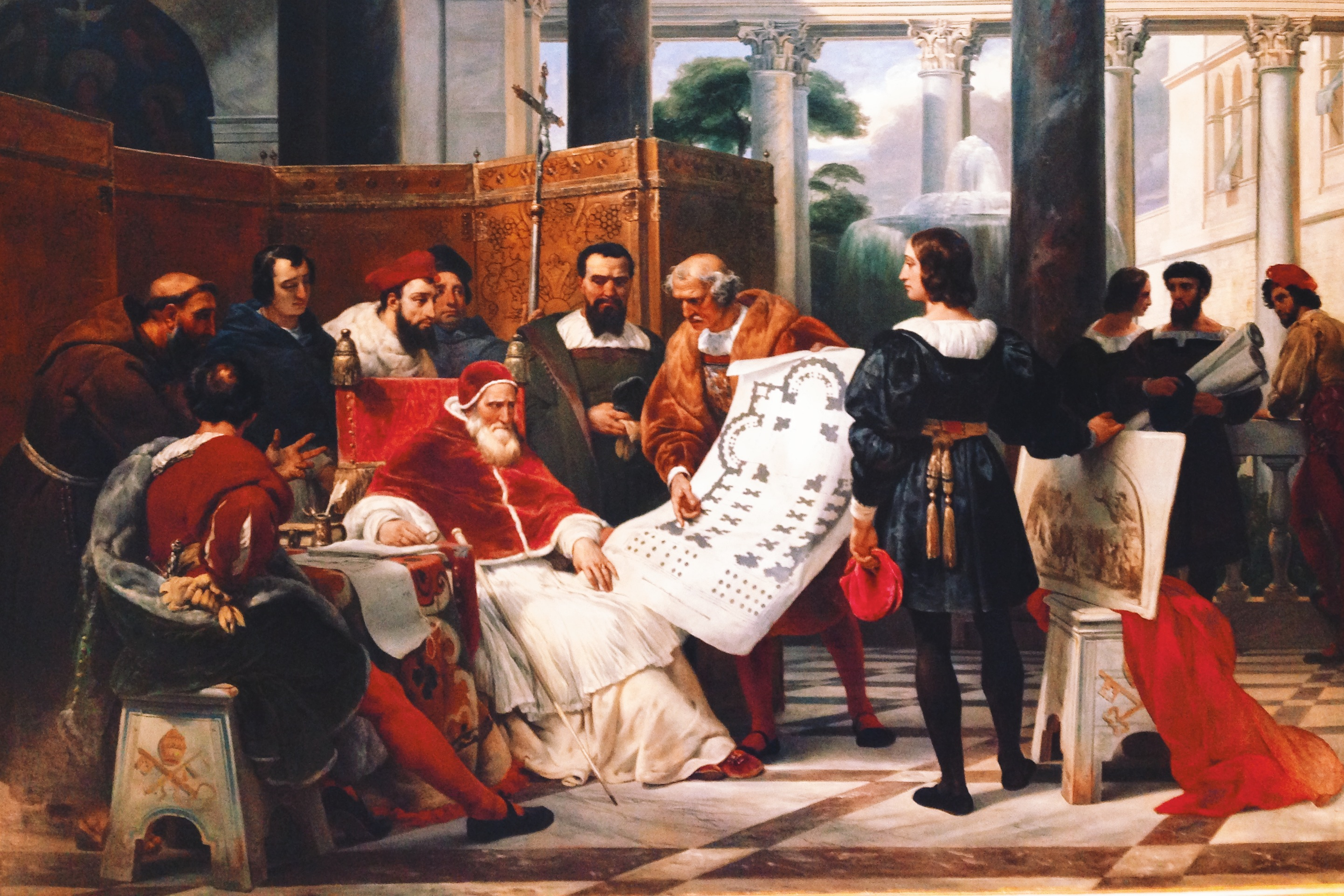
Julius commissioning works from Bramante and Raphael, by Alexander Baranov, Louvre, 1827

Long before he became Pope, Julius had a violent temper. He often treated subordinates and people who worked for him very badly. His manner was gruff and coarse, just as was his peasant-like sense of humour. Others suggest that Julius had little sense of humour. Ludwig von Pastor wrote, "Paris de Grassis, his Master of Ceremonies, who has handed on to us so many characteristic features of his master's life, says that he hardly ever jested. He was generally absorbed in deep and silent thought."

To most historians, Julius was manly and virile, an energetic man of action, whose courage saved the Papacy. There was a sense that war caused him serious illness, exhaustion, and fatigue, that most other popes would have been unlikely to have endured. To many, Julius II has been described as the best in an era of exceptionally bad popes: Alexander VI was widely perceived as evil and despotic, exposing the future Julius II to a number of assassination attempts that required tremendous fortitude.

==== Physical appearance ====
Julius II is usually depicted with a beard, after his appearance in the celebrated portrait by Raphael, the artist whom he first met in 1509. However, the pope only wore his beard from 27 June 1511 to March 1512, as a sign of mourning at the loss of the city of Bologna by the Papal States. He was nevertheless the first pope since antiquity to grow facial hair, a practice otherwise forbidden by canon law since the 13th century. The pope's hirsute chin may have raised severe, even vulgar criticism, as at one Bologna banquet held in 1510 at which papal legate Marco Cornaro was present. In overturning the ban on beards, Pope Julius challenged Gregorian conventional wisdom in dangerous times. Julius shaved his beard again before his death, and his immediate successors were clean-shaven; nonetheless, Pope Clement VII sported a beard when mourning the sack of Rome. Thenceforward, all popes were bearded until the death of Pope Innocent XII in 1700.

The frescoes on the ceiling of Stanza d'Eliodoro in the stanze of Raphael depict the traumatic events in 1510–11 when the Papacy regained its freedom. Although Raphael's original was lost, it was thought to relate closely to the personal iconography of Stanza della Segnatura, commissioned by Pope Julius himself. The Lateran Council, which formed the Holy League, marked a high point in his personal success. Saved by an allegory to the Expulsion of Heliodorus, the French gone, Julius collapsed once again in late 1512, very seriously ill once more.

==== Personal relationships and sexuality ====
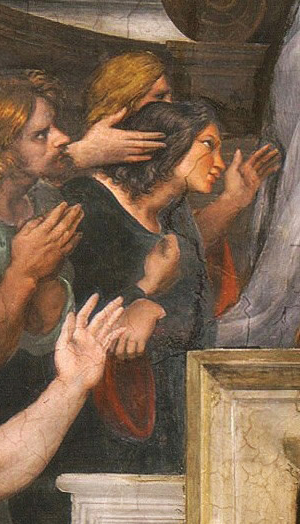
Julius II's daughter, Felice della Rovere (in black), by Raphael in The Mass at Bolsena

Julius was not the first pope to have fathered children before being elevated to high office, and had a daughter born to Lucrezia Normanni in 1483 – after he had been made a cardinal. (Note: Until the 20th century, a Cardinal did not have to be in major Holy Orders (Bishop, Priest, Deacon – which involved the vow of celibacy), unless he hoped to vote in a papal conclave. Even then, he could be dispensed.) Felice della Rovere survived into adulthood. (Note: Pompeo Litta mistakenly attributed Felice's two daughters, Giulia and Clarice, to him as well.) Shortly after Felice was born, Julius arranged for Lucrezia to marry Bernardino de Cupis, Chamberlain to Julius's cousin, Cardinal Girolamo Basso della Rovere. In addition to producing an illegitimate daughter (and having at least one mistress), it was suggested that Julius may have had homosexual lovers – although it is not possible to confirm this claim. His confrontational style inevitably created enemies and sodomy was the "common currency of insult and innuendo". Such accusations were made to discredit him, but perhaps in so doing his accusers were exploiting a generally "perceived weakness".

The Venetians, who were implacably opposed to the pope's new military policy, were among the most vociferous opponents; notable among them was the diarist Girolamo Priuli. Erasmus also implied sexual misconduct in his 1514 dialogue Julius Excluded from Heaven; a theme picked up in the denunciation made at the conciliabulum of Pisa. Criticism was furthermore made of the sinister influence exerted by his advisor, Francesco Alidosi, whom Julius had made a cardinal in 1505. However, it is likely that the closeness was down to the fact that he simply knew how to handle him well. This sexual reputation survived Julius, and the accusation continued to be made without reservation by Protestant opponents in their polemics against "papism" and Catholic decadence. The French writer Philippe de Mornay (1549–1623) accused all Italians of being sodomites, but added specifically: "This horror is ascribed to good Julius."

=== Depiction ===
- Julius features prominently in The Prince of Niccolò Machiavelli (1532), both as an enemy of the leading protagonist Cesare Borgia, and as an example of an ecclesiastical prince who consolidates authority and wisely follows Fortuna.
- Barbara Tuchman, in her book The March of Folly: From Troy to Vietnam, offers a narrative of Julius II's career. Her overall assessment of Julius is strongly negative, and she attributes the Protestant Reformation to his and other Renaissance popes' abuses.
- In the 1965 film The Agony and the Ecstasy about the life of Michelangelo, Julius is portrayed as a soldier-pope (though without facial hair) by Rex Harrison. The film is a dramatization based upon the 1961 book of the same name by Irving Stone.
- Della Rovere was portrayed by Alfred Burke in the 1981 BBC series The Borgias, by Colm Feore in Neil Jordan's 2011 series The Borgias, and by Dejan Čukić in Tom Fontana's 2011 series, Borgia.
- On 30 November 2003, Cardinal Angelo Sodano, then Secretary of State of the Holy See, presided in a Eucharistic concelebration commemorating the fifth centenary of the election of Pope Julius II in the Cathedral Basilica of Savona. In his sermon he explained that Pope John Paul II, to pay homage to his great predecessor, had sent him (Sodano) as his Legate. Admitting that it is difficult to understand the methods of government of that time, Sodano stressed that the work of the Bishop of Rome should be seen in its proper context. Praising Julius for entrusting the construction of St. Peter's Basilica in its present form to the genius of Bramante in 1505, he said it is certain that Julius liked to think big and wanted the Church of Rome to shine before the world with a visible beauty, too. The Cardinal stated, "How can we fail to think of him when we contemplate the grandeur of St. Peter's Basilica?" and "How can we forget that it was he who created in 1506 the Swiss Guard Corps, with the characteristic uniform that we still admire today?" The Cardinal called Pope Julius II "a Pope who strove to serve the Church and to sacrifice himself for her until the Lord called him at the age of 72".

== See also ==
- Art patronage of Julius II
- Cardinals created by Julius II

== Sources ==
- Albury, W.R. (June 2011). "Castiglione's 'Francescopaedia': Pope Julius II and Francesco Maria Della Rovere in 'The Book of the Courtier'". Sixteenth Century Journal. 42 (2): 323–347. doi:10.1086/SCJ23076786. JSTOR 23076786.
- Albury, W.R. (2014). Castiglione's Allegory: Veiled Policy in The Book of the Courtier. Vol. 68. Farnham: Ashgate Publishing. pp. 1499–1501. doi:10.1086/685233. S2CID 164035906. Online version by Cambridge University Press (20 November 2018).
- Burchard, Johann (1883). Thuasne, Louis (ed.). Diarium (in Latin and French). Vol. I (1483–1492). Paris: Ernest Leroux.
- Burchard, Johann (1884). Thuasne, Louis (ed.). Diarium. Vol. II (1492–1499).
- Burchard, Johann (1885). Thuasne, Louis (ed.). Diarium. Vol. III (1500–1506).
- Creighton, Mandell (1903). A History of the Papacy from the Great Schism to the Sack of Rome. Vol. IV – The Italian Princes (1464–1518) (new ed.). London: Longmans, Green & Co.
- Döllinger, Johann Joseph Ignaz von (1882). Beiträge Zur politischen, kirchlichen und Cultur-geschichte der Sechs letzten Jahrhunderte (in German). Vol. III. Vienna: Manz.
- Dumesnil, Antoine Jules (1873). Histoire de Jules II: sa vie et son pontificat (in French). Paris: Librairie Renouard.
- Eubel, Konrad, ed. (1914). Hierarchia catholica medii aevi (in Latin). Vol. II (2nd ed.). Münster: Libreria Regensbergiana.
- Gregorovius, Ferdinand (1900). Hamilton, Annie (ed.). History of the City of Rome in the Middle Ages. Vol. VII. London: G. Bell & sons. Vol. VII Part 1 – Vol. VII Part 2
- Gregorovius, Ferdinand (1902). Hamilton, Annie (ed.). History of the city of Rome in the Middle Ages. Vol. VIII Part 1. London: George Bell.
- Mallett, Michael; Shaw, Christine (2014) [2012]. The Italian Wars 1494-1559: War, State and Society in Early Modern Europe. London and New York: Routledge. ISBN 978-1-317-89939-6.
- Mansi, J.-D., ed. (1902). Sacrorum conciliorum nova et amplissima collectio editio novissima. Vol. XXXII. Paris: Hubert Welter.
- Murphy, Caroline P. (2005). The Pope's Daughter: The Extraordinary Life of Felice della Rovere. Oxford University Press.
- Norwich, John J. (1982). A History of Venice. New York: Knopf. ISBN 978-0-679-72197-0.
- Pastor, Ludwig von (1902). The History of the Popes, from the close of the Middle Ages (third ed.). Saint Louis: B. Herder. Edition by Kegan Paul, Trench, Trubner & Co. (1911): Vol. IV – Vol. V – Vol. VI.
- Bruschi, Arnaldo (1971). "Donato Bramante". Dizionario Biografico degli Italiani (in Italian). Vol. 13. Istituto dell'Enciclopedia Italiana.
- Pastore, Alessandro (2001). "Giulio II, Papa". Dizionario Biografico degli Italiani (in Italian). Vol. 57. Istituto dell'Enciclopedia Italiana.
- Platina, Bartholomaeus (1568). Historia de vitis pontificum Romanorum [Lives of the Roman Popes] (in Latin). Cologne: Cholinus.
- Priuli, Girolamo (1938). Cessi, Roberto (ed.). Diarii: Rerum italicarum scriptores. Vol. 24 – III. Bologna: Nicola Zanichelli.
- Sanuto, Marino (1879–1902). I Diarii (in Italian). Vol. I, IV, XV. Venice: Federico Visentini.
- Setton, Kenneth M. (1984). The Papacy and the Levant (1204-1571). Vol. 3. Philadelphia: American Philosophical Society. ISBN 978-0-87169-161-3.
- Shaw, Christine (1993). Julius II: The Warrior Pope. Oxford: Blackwell. ISBN 978-0-631-16738-9.
- Shaw, Christine (2017). "Julius II and Maximilian I" (PDF). Bibliothek des Deutschen Historischen Instituts in Rom. 134: 155–168.
- Strathern, Paul (2003). The Medici: Godfathers of the Renaissance. London: Jonathan Cape. ISBN 978-0224071062.
- Wilkie, William E. (1974). The Cardinal Protectors of England: Rome and the Tudors Before the Reformation. CUP Archive. ISBN 978-0521203326.

Catholic Church titles
Preceded by Michel Anglici	Bishop of Carpentras; 1471–1472	Succeeded by Federico di Saluzzo
Preceded by Barthélémy Chuet	Bishop of Lausanne; 1472–1473	Succeeded by Benoît de Montferrand
Preceded by Guglielmo Belloni	Bishop of Catania; 1473–1474	Succeeded by Francesco de Campulo
Preceded by Alain de Coëtivy	Archbishop of Avignon; 1474–1503	Succeeded by Antoine Florès
Preceded by Benoît de Montferrand	Bishop of Coutances; 1476–1477	Succeeded by Galeazzo della Rovere
Preceded by Hélie de Pompadour	Bishop of Viviers; 1477–1479	Succeeded by Jean de Montchenu
Preceded by Jean de Petit	Bishop of Mende; 1478–1483	Succeeded by Clemente Grosso della Rovere
Preceded by Berardo Eroli	Cardinal-bishop of Sabina; 1479–1483	Succeeded by Oliviero Carafa
Preceded by Marco Barbo	Camerlengo of the Sacred College of Cardinals; 1479	Succeeded by Giovanni Battista Zeno
Preceded by Giacomo Passarelli	Bishop of Bologna; 1483–1502	Succeeded by Vincenzo Carafa
Preceded by Guillaume d'Estouteville	Cardinal-bishop of Ostia; 1483–1503	Succeeded by Oliviero Carafa
Preceded by Jean de Corguilleray	Bishop of Lodève; 1488–1489	Succeeded by Guillaume Briçonnet
Preceded by Pietro Gara	Bishop of Savona; 1499–1502	Succeeded by Galeotto della Rovere
Preceded by Giovanni Stefano Ferrero	Bishop of Vercelli; 1502–1503	Succeeded by Giovanni Stefano Ferrero
Preceded by Pius III	Pope; 1 November 1503 – 21 February 1513	Succeeded by Leo X
