= Giovanni della Rovere, Duke of Sora =

Italian condottiero

Giovanni della Rovere

Duke of Sora
- Tenure: 1475–1501
- Predecessor: Leonardo della Rovere
- Successor: Francesco Maria I della Rovere
- Born: 1457
- Died: November 1501 (aged 43–44); Rome, Papal States
- Spouse: Giovanna da Montefeltro
- Issue: Francesco Maria I della Rovere
- Father: Raffaello della Rovere

Giovanni della Rovere (1457 – November 1501) was an Italian condottiero. He was a nephew of Pope Sixtus IV, and the brother of Giuliano della Rovere (1443–1513), Pope Julius II from 1503.

== Biography ==
Giovanni della Rovere was born to Raffaello della Rovere at Savona. In 1474, thanks to his uncle, Pope Sixtus IV, he became lord of the papal fiefs of Senigallia and Mondavio. He was also Prefect of Rome and Duke of Sora and Arce. In 1484, Pope Innocent VIII appointed him Captain-General of the Church.

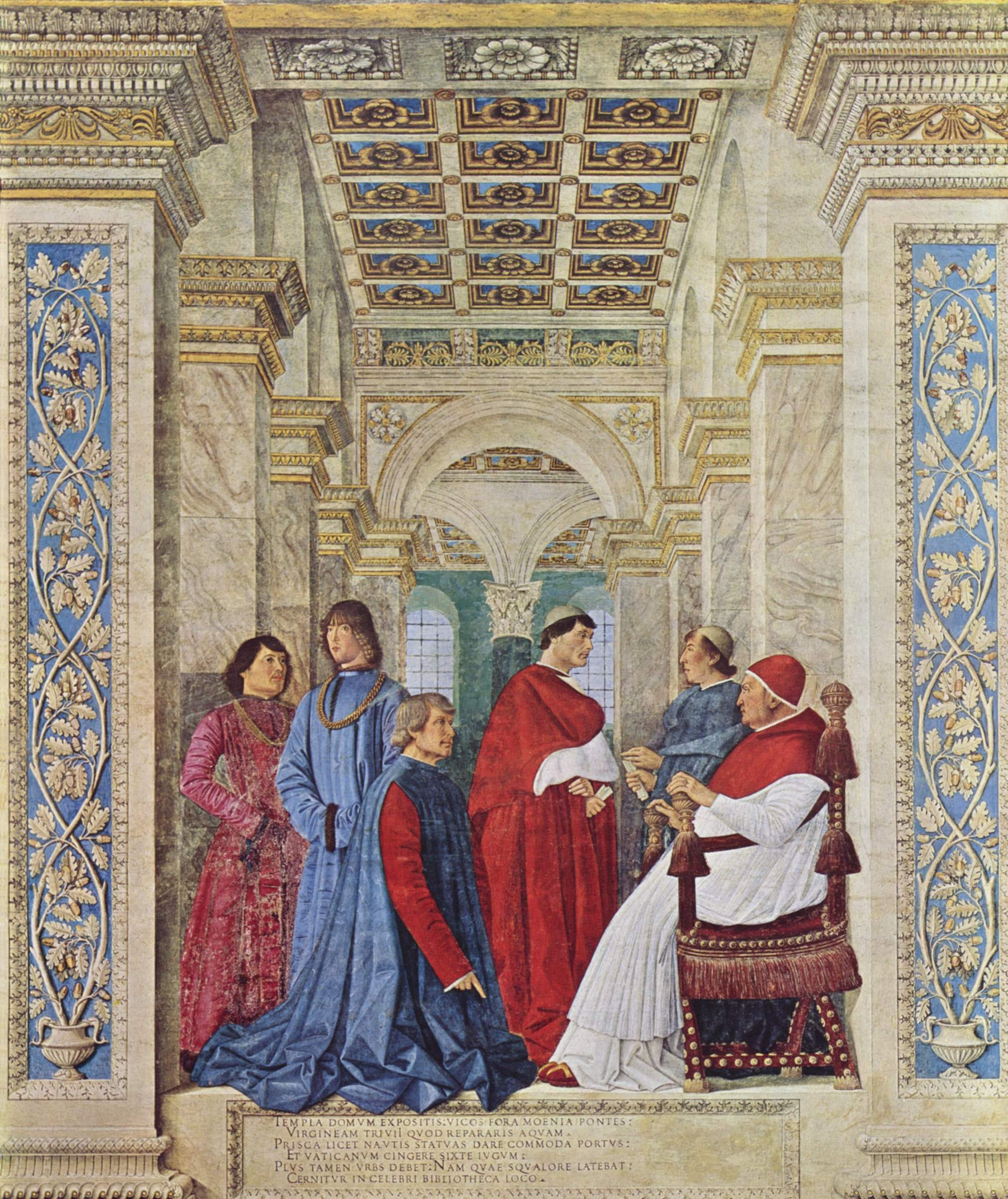
Sixtus IV Appointing Platina as Prefect of the Vatican Library. The pope is seated among his nephews; Giovanni della Rovere is seen on the far left.

He married Giovanna da Montefeltro, daughter of Federico III da Montefeltro, and some of their descendants adopted the surname Montefeltro della Rovere. Their children included Francesco Maria I della Rovere, the first Duke of Urbino, who married Eleonora Gonzaga.

After Charles VIII of France had abandoned the Kingdom of Naples and the Aragonese had been restored there, a conspiracy was hatched against the latter at Isola di Sora, in Giovanni's territories. However, the plot was thwarted, although after it the Duchy of Sora followed a more anti-Spanish and pro-papal policy, and Giovanni led some pro-French expeditions in Campania and Abruzzo from 1494 to 1501. In 1495, he conquered Ceprano, Montecassino and the Terra Sancti Benedicti. In 1496, he defended the duchy against Prospero Colonna and Frederick IV of Naples, losing some territories, although most of them were later returned to him by Pope Alexander VI.

Giovanni della Rovere died in Rome in 1501.

== See also ==
- Duchy of Sora

== Notes ==
Italian nobility
Preceded by Leonardo della Rovere	Duke of Sora; 1475–1501	Succeeded by Francesco Maria I della Rovere
