= Raffaello Tancredi =

Italian painter

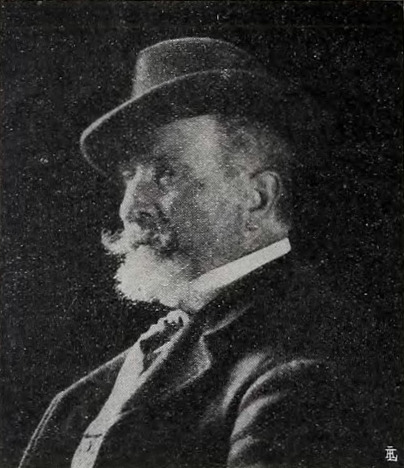
- Born: 2 October 1837; Ercolano
- Died: 1916 (aged 78–79); Naples
- Occupation: Painter

Raffaello Tancredi (Resina, 1837 – Naples, 1916) was an Italian painter, mainly of historical subjects.

== Biography ==
He was a pupil of the Academy of Fine Arts of Naples, obtained a three-year (1864–67) state-funded stipend to travel to Florence; in 1868 he exhibited a canvas: Buoso da Doaro recognized by his fellow citizens. At this competition both Tancredi and Alessandro Focosi, were awarded the first prize. At the Exposition Nazionale of Milan, in 1872, he exhibited il Caracciolo, who tradition holds that Francesco Caracciolo was arrested by the forces of the Papal States, due to the treason of a servant.

Tancredi became a professor at the Academy of Fine Arts and was knighted into the Order of the Crown of Italy.

== Other works ==
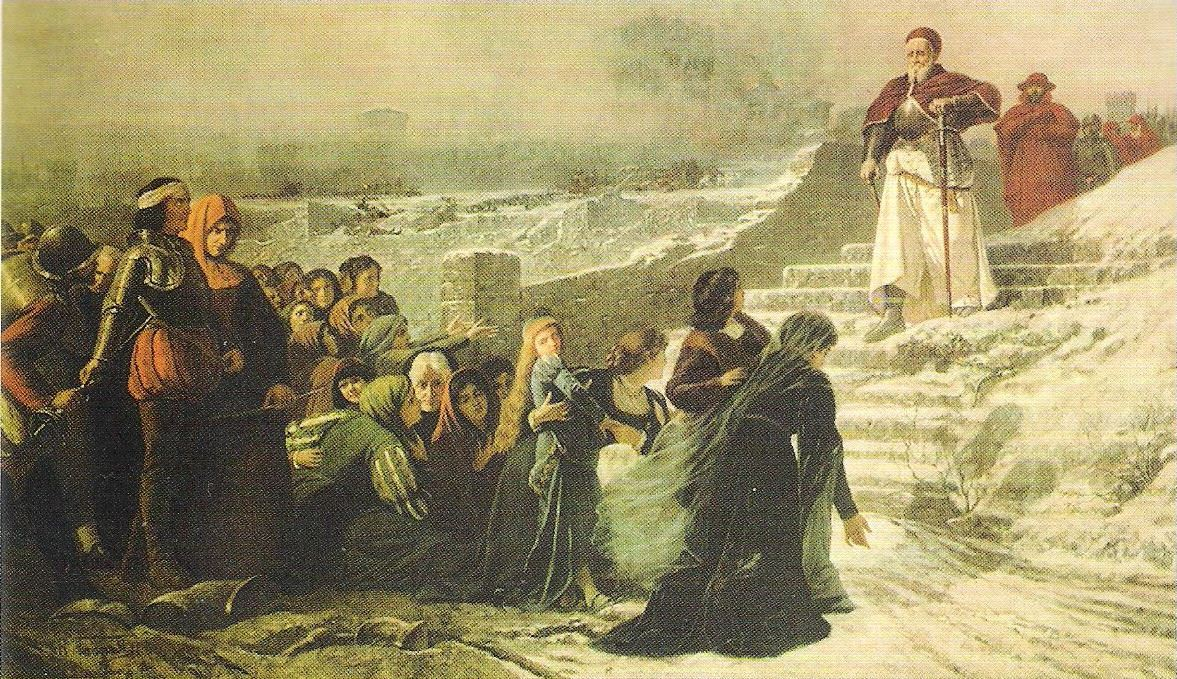
Pope Julius II on the walls of the conquered city of Mirandola (oil on canvas, 1890, City Hall of Mirandola)

Other major works by Tancredi are:

- The gentlemen in the Boboli Gardens in the past century
- Go to gain
- Paisiello jailed for writing a Republican hymn, is released by musicians of Russian regiments stationed in Naples
- The auctioneer of wine in Naples
- For markets of the East
- White slave men
- Pirates
- The punctured pocket
- Pope Julius II on the walls of the conquered city of Mirandola
- The youth of Ferdinand IV
- Famous music teacher jailed.
