= Antonello Petrucci =

Antonello Petrucci, also known as Antonello d'Aversa (born in Teano – died in Naples, 1487) was a Baron and secretary to King Ferdinand I of Naples (Don Ferrante of Naples).

== Biography ==
Petrucci was born to a humble family, and rose first as an assistant to Giovanni Ammirato di Aversa, to become skillful in jurisprudence and negotiations. He was hired by the chancellery of Alfonso V of Aragon in the 1450s. He was appointed as a Baron by King Fernando I of Naples. Petruccio was used as a negotiator with the rebellious barons, and had become somewhat close to some of them. However, the rebellion encompassed by the Conspiracy of the Barons, known in Italian as the Congiura dei Baroni, he met his downfall.

On 13 August 1486, while celebrating at Castel Nuovo the marriage of Maria Piccolomini (niece of Don Ferrante) and Marco Coppola, son of a rich baronial merchant, the king entered the great hall with his soldiers and arrested both Petrucci and Coppola and their sons, and others for being part of the conspiracy.

Contemporary sources state that on 13 November 1486, at Castelnuovo a sentence of condemnation was issued against Antonello's sons, Francesco de' Petrucci, Count of Carinola and Giovanni Antonio de' Petrucci, Count of Policastro, as well as against Francesco Coppola, Count of Sarno; condemning them to decapitation, loss of all their honors and dignities, and the confiscation of all their possessions. On 11 December, Francesco was placed in a small cart, with a cord round his neck and chained; he was conducted past all the noble sediles (districts) in the town, until he reached the great Piazza del Mercato, where a high scaffold had been erected, and the executioner decapitated him and quartered him: the quarter of the head was exposed upon a stake with iron prongs by the custom-house at Casa Nuova, the second by the custom-house at Sant'Antonio, the third by the bridge and the house of Angelo Covio, and the fourth by a chapel. The same day, his brother Giovan Antonio, underwent the same punishment without quartering. On 11 May 1487, a tall scaffold was erected from the ramparts, visible to the public, and Antonello and Francesco Coppola were decapitated. Dominican friars came and carried away the corpse of Antonello to his family chapel, and Augustinian monks conveyed the body of Coppola together with his head, to his chapel in their church. There were sixteen monks with twelve torches who thus bore away the corpses."

== Legacy ==
The events of 1486 led in the short term to a reassertion of the regal Aragonese power over the aristocracy in Naples. It is noticeable that both Coppola and Petrucci were newcomers to the aristocracy, gaining their titles through service and not through ancestral landholdings; this, and their residence in Naples, made them more susceptible and easy targets for the king to acquire their riches. Much controversy followed because some pointed out the king had agreed to a general pardon for those in rebellion, when the arrests were made, and that he had set up the wedding as a trap for the families.

The events bear some semblance to the events depicted in the Red Wedding scene of the George R. R. Martin's novel A Storm of Swords.
