= Conspiracy of the Barons =

1485–86 revolt against the King of Naples

The Conspiracy of the Barons was a revolution against Ferrante of Aragon, King of Naples, by the Neapolitan aristocracy in 1485 and 1486. King Ferdinand the First, also known as Ferrante, aimed at dispelling the feudal particularism, strengthening the royal power as the only unquestionable source of authority.

A first fierce confrontation had raged across the kingdom for three years, but King Ferrante managed to put down the riot, thanks to the assistance of a garrison of 1,000 foot soldiers and 700 knights led by Giogio Castriota Scanderbeg from Albania, looking for new lands for his folk scattered by the Turkish army. So, this first conflict, also known as the "first battle of the barons", ended in 1462 with a clear victory of the King who could carry on his centralizing policy.

On 28 July 1480, the Turkish army landed in the area of Salento (within the regional administration of Puglia). Their armed forces besieged the city of Otranto, whose population lacking in assistance and protection from the King and the local noble families, had to capitulate some weeks later. In the whole kingdom of Naples the feudal army had gone completely missing and the organization of a mercenary conscription system did not work yet. As a result, the King Ferrante was compelled to subject the whole population to great financial efforts, which weakened the monarchy's consensus. Moreover, a general impoverishment and a critical financial disorder was spreading in the country so that even the King was obliged either to sell or pawn part of his family's jewels and some precious books and manuscripts from his library. The tax burden reached an unbearable level and this further tax increase made barons upset, also as they saw in these measures a way of taking a revenge on them for an alleged relationship with the city Venice, enemy of the Aragon crown.

What particularly concerned the local aristocracy was the King's project of expropriating them and creating a wide area around Naples, within which the unique and unquestionable authority of the King was free of any sort of interference by other feudal lordship.

The election on the papal throne of Giovanni Battista Cybo as Innocent VIII in 1484 weakened the Aragon dynasty in the south of Italy, since Ferrante had been supporting a Cybo competitor, Rodrigo Borgia. Some of the most influential barons in the Neapolitan realm such as Antonello Petrucci, Francesco Coppola and Girolamo Sanseverino were willing to make the most of this situation, arranging a new plot against Ferrante and his son the Duke of Calabria, fifteen years after a first baronial attempt. This second conspiracy was plotted in 1485 and one of its main leaders was the prince of Salerno Antonello II dei Sanseverino who, on the advice of Antonello Petrucci and Francesco Coppola, gathered together several feudal families belonging to the Guelph faction and supporting the Angevin. Among them there were Caracciolo prince of Melfi, Gesualdo marquis of Caggiano, Balzo-Orsini prince of Altamura and Guevara, count of Ariano. Both Antonello Petrucci and Bernardo Coppola belonged to a new kind of nobility issued from the raising upper middle class. They were two key men of the conspiracy. First, the rebels gathered in Melfi and gave Girolamo Sanseverino, Prince of Bisignano and count of Tricarico and Miglionico, the duty of checking the potential alliances, gaining the support of others noble families and working at the same time on a negotiation with the King. Girolamo Sanseverino met in Naples Antonello Petrucci and Bernardo Coppola, councillors of Ferrante, in order to discover the intentions of the Court and figure out their next steps.

On 26 September 1485, a first group of rebel barons took possession of the city of L'Aquila, getting rid of the royal garrison and raising the banner of the Pope, who was the only authority up to question the legitimacy of Ferrante as king of Naples.

A few months later, the rebellion against the royalty rose also in the territory of Salerno. Federico, younger son of Ferrante was arrested and held as a prisoner by the rebels. The main strategic idea of the rebels was to interrupt the communication between Naples and the other regions of the kingdom, preventing the King and his army from going through their territory. Once the capital would be isolated, they would allow to the Pope to enter the kingdom Naples and endow another candidate to the Neapolitan Throne. To do so, they counted on Lorena and Roberto di San Severino's intervention. Nevertheless, the Lorena never showed up.

After forming an alliance with Florence and Milan, the king quickly started fighting back. He immediately reacted in a strong and firm way, proceeding with wide seizure of their properties. Eventually, according to the historian Camillo Porzio, the King and the rebels met in the Castle del Malconsiglio in Miglionico for a decisive meeting. The rebel barons seemed to be satisfied with what Ferrante pretended to be willing to grant them. Nevertheless, he finally had them imprisoned and sentenced. The very last episode of this conspiracy happened in 1487 in the New Castel of Naples. In the so known “room of the Barons” the surviving rebels were arrested and killed.

The events were described by the 16th-century Italian historian Camillo Porzio in one of his most famous works : "La congiura dei Baroni del regno di Napoli contra re Ferdinando".

== Bibliography ==
- Paladino, Giuseppe (1930), "Baroni, congiura di," Enciclopedia Italiana (1930) (in Italian)
- Scarton, Elisabetta (2011). "La congiura dei baroni del 1485–87 e la sorte dei ribelli," in: Francesco Senatore; Francesco Storti (2011). Poteri, relazioni, guerra nel regno di Ferrante d'Aragona (in Italian). Napoli: ClioPress. Editoria digitale. pp. 213–290. ISBN 978-88-88904-13-9.
