= Clemente Grosso della Rovere =

Italian Roman Catholic bishop and cardinal

His Eminence Clemente Grosso della Rovere
- Cardinal, Bishop of Mende
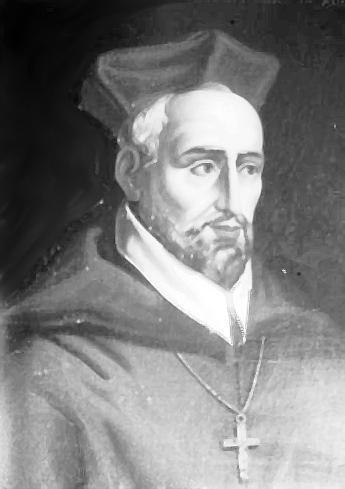
- Diocese: Mende
- Elected: 27 October 1483
- In office: 1483–1504

Orders
- Created cardinal: 29 November 1503 by Pope Julius II

Personal details
- Born: c. 1462 Savona, Kingdom of Sardinia
- Died: 18 August 1504 (aged c. 42/41) Rome, Papal States
- Buried: St. Peter's Basilica
- Denomination: Roman Catholic

Clemente Grosso della Rovere (c. 1462 – 18 August 1504) was an Italian Roman Catholic bishop and cardinal.

== Biography ==
Clemente Grosso della Rovere was born in Savona, c. 1462, the son of Antonio Grosso and Maria Basso della Rovere, a member of the House of della Rovere. He was a grand-nephew of Pope Sixtus IV and a nephew of Cardinal Girolamo Basso della Rovere. One of his brothers, Leonardo Grosso della Rovere, also became a cardinal.

Early in his life, he joined the Conventual Franciscans in Savona. He then became a Referendary of the Apostolic Signatura. He was also papal treasurer in Perugia.

On October 27, 1483, he was elected Bishop of Mende. In 1495, Cardinal Giuliano della Rovere named him vice-legate in Avignon. He became the rector of the Comtat Venaissin in 1496. Because of his poor health, he left Avignon on April 11, 1502.

Pope Julius II made him a cardinal priest in the consistory of November 29, 1503. He received the red hat on December 4, 1503, and head of the titular church of Santi Apostoli on December 6, 1503. Due to bad health, he retired to Perugia in 1504.

He died in Rome on August 18, 1504. He was buried in St. Peter's Basilica.
