= Sisto Gara della Rovere =

Italian cardinal (1473–1517)

His Eminence Sisto Gara della Rovere
- Cardinal; Bishop of Padua
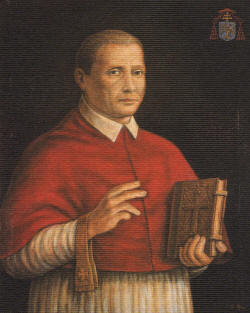
- Diocese: Padua
- Appointed: 11 June 1509
- In office: 1509–1517
- Predecessor: Pietro Barozzi
- Successor: Marco Cornaro

Orders
- Consecration: 25 November 1509 by Leonardo Grosso della Rovere
- Created cardinal: 11 September 1507 by Pope Julius II

Personal details
- Born: 1473 Savona, Republic of Genoa
- Died: 8 March 1517 (aged c. 44/43) Rome, Papal States
- Buried: San Pietro in Vincoli
- Denomination: Roman Catholic

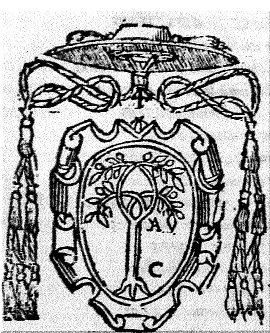
Coat of arms of Cardinal Sisto Gara della Rovere

Sisto Gara della Rovere, also known as Sisto Franciotti della Rovere, (1473 – 8 March 1517) was an Italian Roman Catholic bishop and cardinal.

== Biography ==
Sisto Gara della Rovere was born in Savona in 1473, the son of Gabriele Gara and Luchina Della Rovere, a member of the House of della Rovere. He was the nephew of Pope Julius II and the grand-nephew of Pope Sixtus IV. He was the half-brother of Cardinal Galeotto Franciotti della Rovere.

Pope Julius II made him a cardinal priest in the consistory of 11 September 1507. He received the red hat and the titular church of San Pietro in Vincoli on the same day. He also became Vice-Chancellor of the Holy Roman Church at this time, holding that office for the rest of his life.

The same day he became a cardinal, he was named apostolic administrator of the see of Lucca. He only resigned this post 5 days before his death. From 11 September 1507 until 11 June 1509 he was also administrator of the see of Vicenza. He was administrator of the metropolitan see of Benevento from 11 September 1508 to 6 March 1514. In 1508, he became Prior in Rome of the Sovereign Military Order of Malta.

He was elected Bishop of Padua on 11 June 1509 and subsequently occupied this see until his death. He was consecrated as a bishop by Cardinal Leonardo Grosso della Rovere in Rome on 25 November 1509.

He was also administrator of the see of Saluzzo from 27 September 1512 to 22 March 1516, though he filled this office through a vicar general, Antonio Vacca.

He participated in both the Fifth Council of the Lateran and in the papal conclave of 1513 that elected Pope Leo X.

He died in Rome on 8 March 1517. He was buried in San Pietro in Vincoli.
