= Leonardo Grosso della Rovere =

Italian Roman Catholic bishop and cardinal

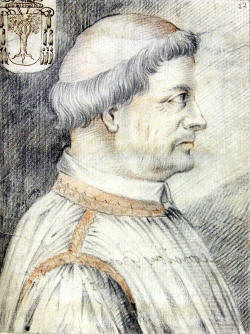
Leonardo Grosso della Rovere

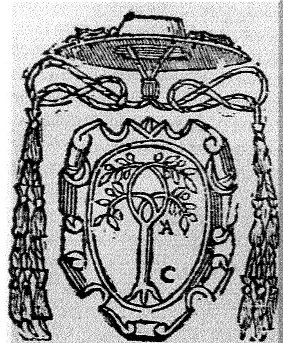
Coat of arms of Cardinal Leonardo Grosso della Rovere

Leonardo Grosso della Rovere (1464 – 17 September 1520) (called the Cardinal of Agen, Aginensis, or Agennensis) was an Italian Roman Catholic bishop and cardinal.

== Biography ==
Leonardo Grosso della Rovere was born in Savona in 1464, the son of Antonio Grosso and Maria della Rovere, a member of the House of della Rovere. He was a grand-nephew of Pope Sixtus IV and a nephew of Cardinal Girolamo Basso della Rovere. One of his brothers, Clemente Grosso della Rovere, also became a cardinal.

After studying canon law and civil law, he moved to Rome, becoming a canon of St. Peter's Basilica.

On 9 December 1487 he was elected Bishop of Agen. He occupied that see until 22 March 1519.

Pope Julius II made him a cardinal priest in the consistory of 1 December 1505. He received the red hat and the titular church of Santi Apostoli, Rome on 17 December 1505.

He accompanied the pope on his expeditions against the House of Bentivoglio in Bologna and the Baglioni family of Perugia. He accompanied the pope to Viterbo on 30 August 1506, becoming papal legate to that city. On 1 February 1507 he was made papal legate to Perugia. Also in 1507, he served as the ambassador of Louis XII of France in Rome.

On 15 December 1508 he opted for the titular church of Santa Susanna. He was the governor of Rome in 1510. He served as Major Penitentiary from 5 October 1511 until his death. He was papal legate to the Patrimonium Sancti Petri in 1511.

He participated in the papal conclave of 1513 that elected Pope Leo X.

Together with Cardinal Lorenzo Pucci, he was the executor of the will of Pope Julius II. In this capacity, he collaborated with Michelangelo on the Tomb of Pope Julius II in San Pietro in Vincoli.

Cardinal della Rovere opted for San Pietro in Vincoli as his titulus on 9 March 1517. In 1518, he became archpriest of the Basilica of Santa Maria Maggiore.

He died in Rome on 17 September 1520, and was buried in the Basilica di Santa Maria Maggiore.
