= Alfonso d'Este =

Alfonso d'Este may refer to:

- Alfonso I d'Este, Duke of Ferrara (r. 1505–1534)
- Alfonso II d'Este, Duke of Ferrara (r. 1559–1597)
- Alfonso III d'Este, Duke of Modena (r. 1628–1629)
- Alfonso IV d'Este, Duke of Modena (r. 1658–1662)
- Alfonso d'Este, Lord of Montecchio (1527–1587)
- Alfonsino d'Este (1560–1578)
