= Portrait of Francesco Maria della Rovere =

Portrait of Francesco Maria della Rovere may refer to:

- Portrait of Francesco Maria della Rovere (Giorgione)
- Portrait of Francesco Maria della Rovere (Titian)
