= Portrait of Alfonso I d'Este =

Painting by Titian

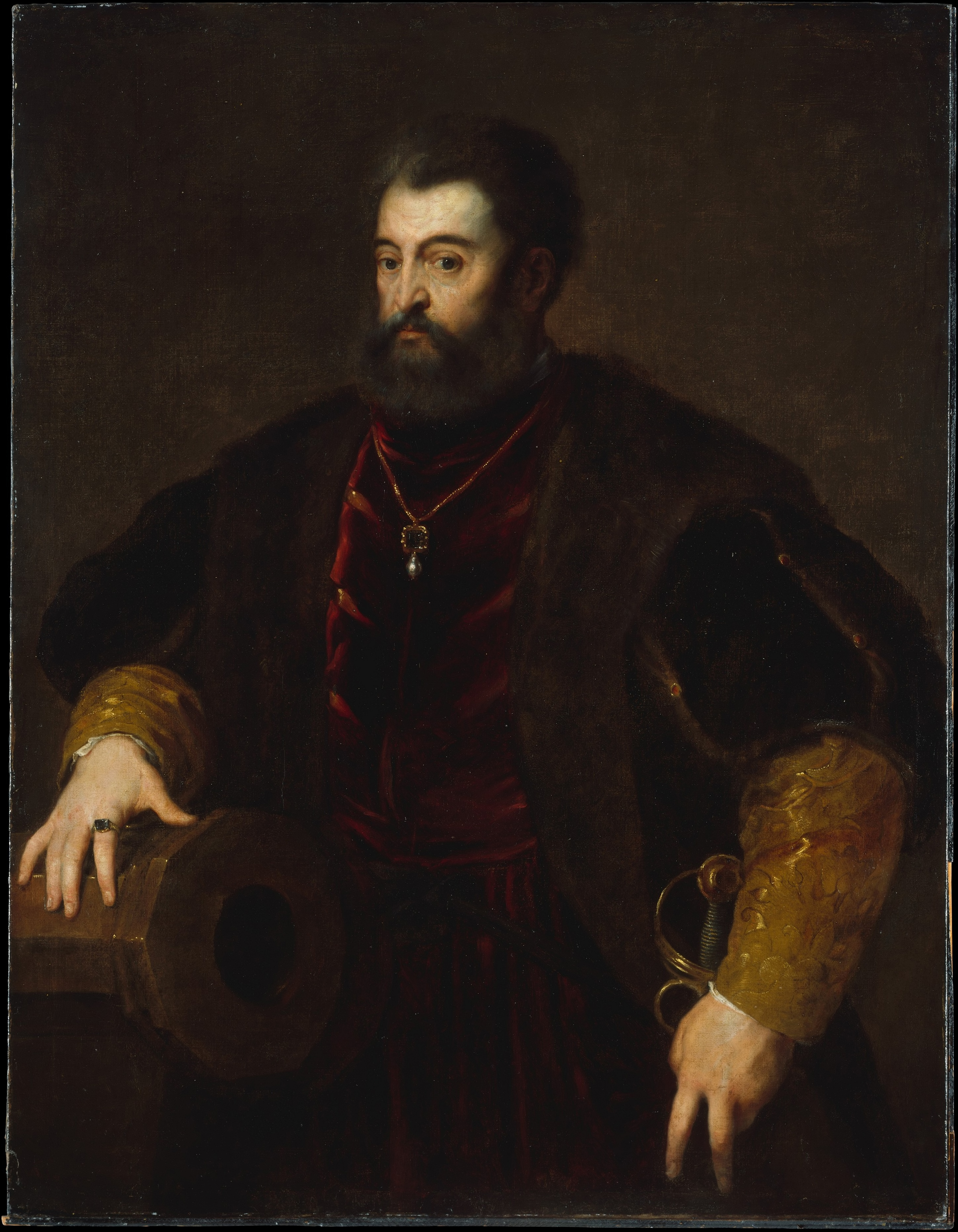
- Metropolitan copy
- Artist: Unknown (original - Titian)
- Year: Unknown (original c.1523)
- Medium: oil on canvas

The Portrait of Alfonso I d'Este is a now-lost painting by Titian, dating to 1523. It was painted as a pendant to the Portrait of Laura Dianti of the same year (Laura Dianti was Alfonso I d'Este's lover) and is now known through copies, one of which is by Rubens and another of which is held at the Metropolitan Museum of Art in New York. Others are held in the collections of the countess of Vogüe Commarin at Dijon and the Statens Museum for Kunst in Copenhagen - the latter is the oldest but only shows the head and shoulders.

The painting showed its subject with his right hand on the muzzle of a cannon and his left hand on the hilt of his sword, underlining his martial prowess during a tense time in his relations with the papacy. It was an influence on Dosso Dossi's later portrait of the duke in a similar pose, leaning on a cannon.

The original was seen by Vasari and admired by Michelangelo on the latter's visit to Ferrara in 1529. It was later given to Charles V, Holy Roman Emperor, who kept it for a time in Bologna before taking it to Spain. It is mentioned in the 1666 and 1686 inventories of the Royal Alcazar of Madrid, but disappeared during the 18th century.

== See also ==
- List of works by Titian

== Bibliography ==
- Francesco Valcanover, L'opera completa di Tiziano, Milan, Rizzoli, 1969.
