= Eleonora d'Este (1561–1637) =

Italian noblewoman

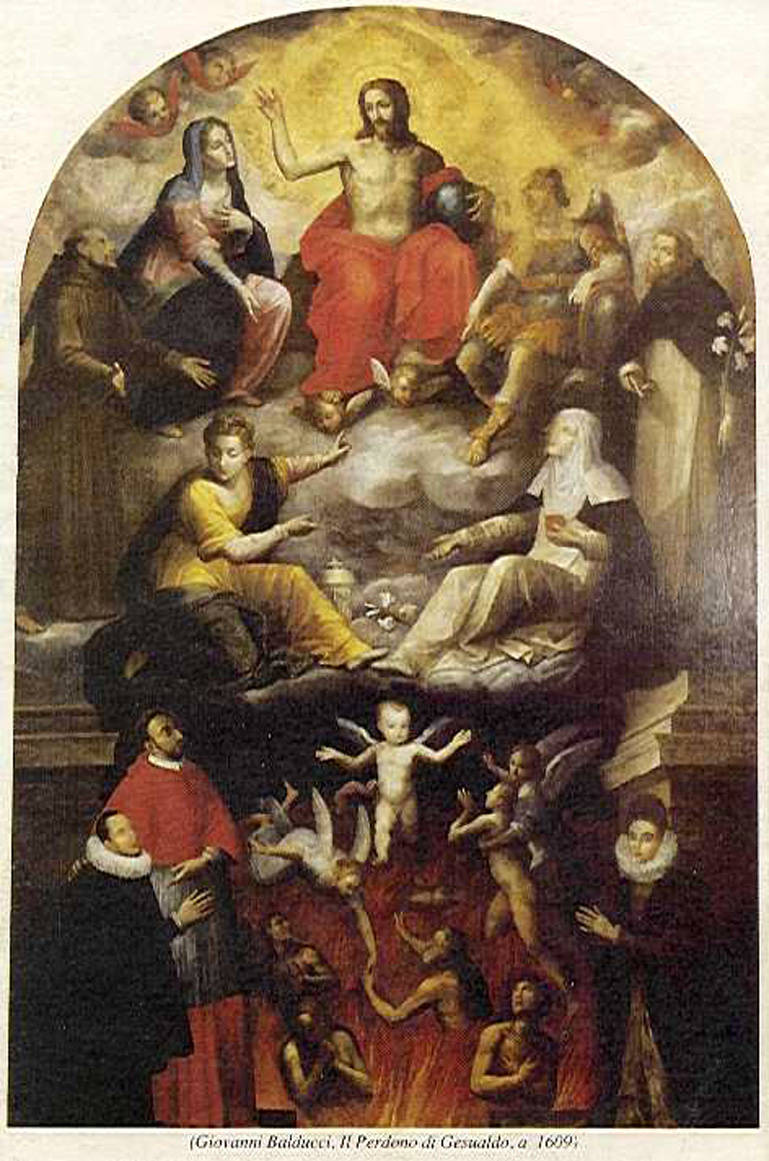
The Pardon of Carlo Gesualdo by Giovanni Balducci (Church of Santa maria delle Grazie in Gesualdo), showing Eleonora bottom right.

Eleonora d'Este (1561–1637) was a Ferrarese noblewoman.

== Life ==
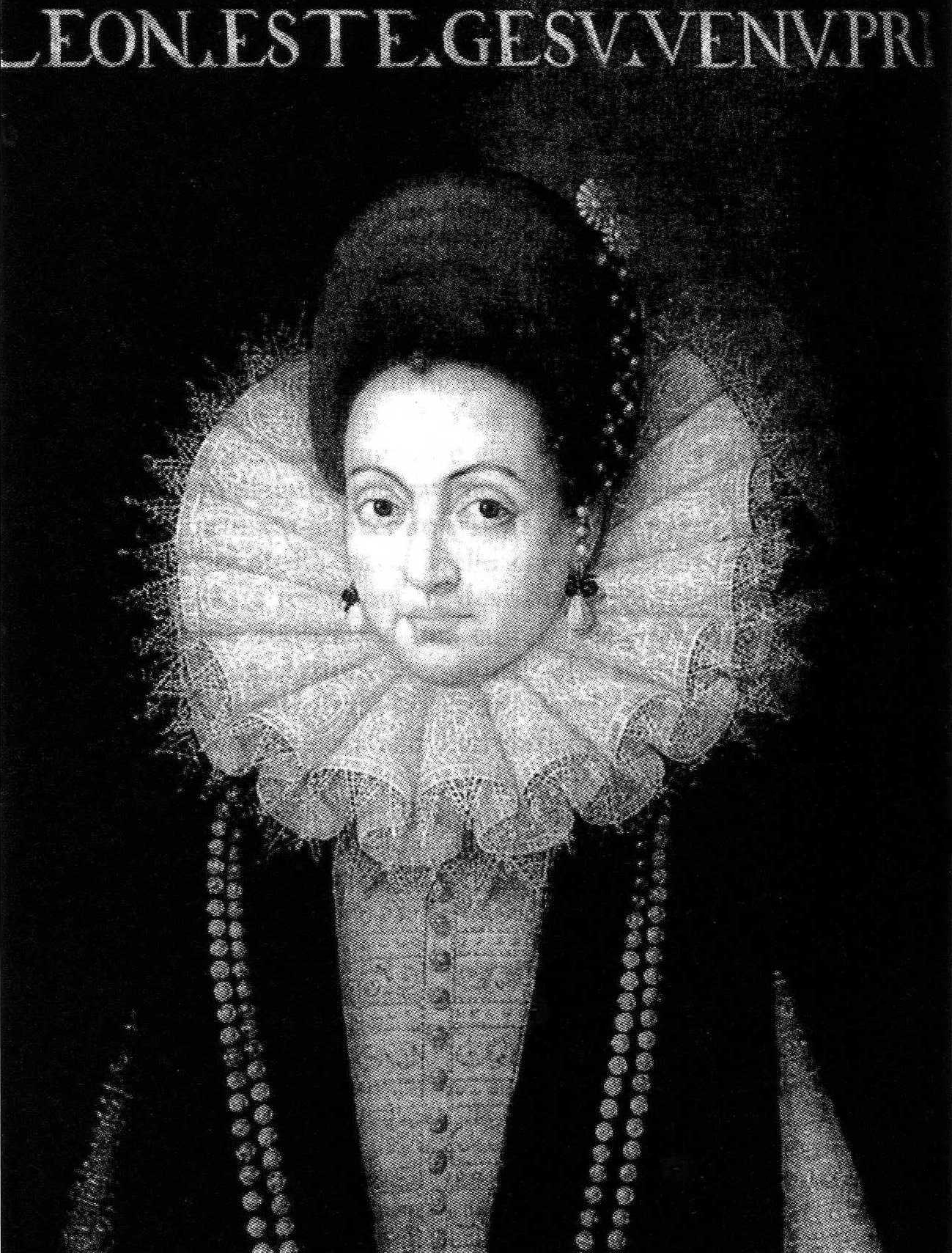
Eleonora d'Este – an anonymous portrait from the ducal palace in Modena.

She was the daughter of Alfonso d'Este (an illegitimate son of Alfonso I d'Este, Duke of Ferrara) and his first wife Giulia della Rovere (daughter of Francesco Maria I della Rovere).

On 21 February 1594 she married the composer Carlo Gesualdo in Ferrara, four years after he murdered his first wife and her lover. Eleonora and Gesualdo's only child was the short-lived don Alfonsino (1595, Ferrara – October 1600, Gesualdo) and the marriage proved unhappy due to Gesualdo's greed and maltreatment.

He died on 10 September 1613 and – although his will stated she would only keep his titles and her annuity if she stayed in Gesualdo – she moved to Modena, where she later died.
