= Yumi Karasumaru =

Japanese artist

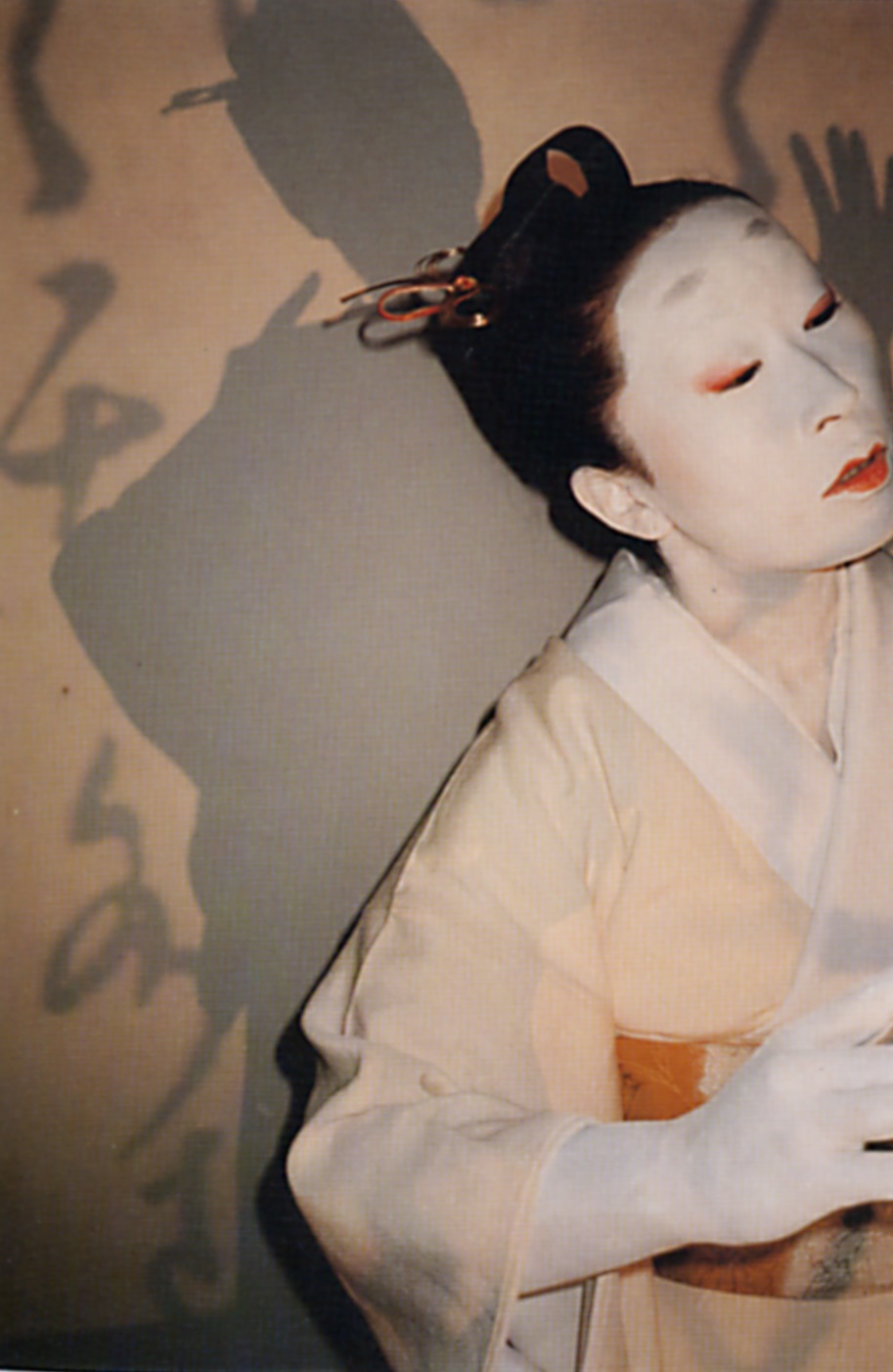
- Website: www.karasumaru.net

Yumi Karasumaru (烏丸 由美, Karasumaru Yumi; born in Osaka) is a Japanese artist. She lives and works in Bologna, Italy, and Kawanishi, Japan.

== Early life and education ==
Karasumaru was born in Osaka. She graduated from the Department of Sculpture at Kyoto City University of Arts and later completed a painting course at the Academy of Fine Arts in Bologna. Since the early 1990s, she has relocated her artistic base to Italy and currently works between Bologna (Italy) and Kawanishi, in Hyōgo Prefecture (Japan).

Her artistic practice reflects an external gaze on contemporary Japan and deals with feelings of love, unease, and ambivalence toward her country of origin. Through painting and performance, she seeks to represent an "other Japan," filtered through a perspective that lies between the inside and the outside.

Since 1995, she has been working on the Atomic Series, and in 1999, she held a solo exhibition in Hiroshima to mark the anniversary of the atomic bombing. Among her major series are also the Family Series (begun in the early 1990s), the Teenager Series (since 2000), and the Tokyo Landscapes Series.

A recurring and central theme in her work is Facing Histories, which explores the relationship between personal and collective memory through a critical and poetic lens.

During the COVID-19 pandemic, she began the Shin Design + Plus Series, inspired by traditional Japanese textile motifs and Woven with a pop sensibility and the influence of European Renaissance painting. This series merges Eastern and Western aesthetics, painting and design, past and present.

The subsequent Onko Chishin Series (温故知新–"learning from the past") focuses on the art of the Edo period, with particular attention to motifs of flowers, birds, and natural landscapes. It seeks a balance between graphic rhythm and color, while experimenting with new details and contemporary sensibilities.

== Selected solo exhibitions ==
- 2025 "Cha-cha-cha con i giocattoli!", 25th anniversary of 24 FRAME Future Film Festival

"at DumBo, Bologna, Italy
https://www.futurefilmfestival.it/en/cha-cha-cha-con-i-giocattoli-yumi-karasumarus-solo-
"exhibition/
https://www.futurefilmfestival.it/it/svelata-limmagine-che-celebra-ledizione-2025/
https://www.artribune.com/arti-performative/cinema/2025/04/intervista-artista-yumi-
karasumaro/

- 2024 "Cha-cha-cha with Toys, Oh, Baby! Cha-cha-cha!", MANIFESTO GALLERY, Osaka, Japan

http://www.14thmoon.com/blog/m/manifesto.cgi?date=2024.10.30
"温故知新 - Forming new art from classics", ESPACE KYOTO, DAIMARU, Kyoto, Japan
"Yumi’s New School - ユミの新しい学校", Alchemilla - Palazzo Vizzani, Bologna, Italy
https://www.alchemilla43.it/2024/04/12/yumis-new-
"Learning from the past - 温故知新", L’Ariete artecontemporanea, Bologna, Italy
https://www.galleriaariete.it/2024/01/21/yumi-karasumaru/

- 2023 "Facing Histories 2023", La Galleria Paola Verrengia, Salerno, Italy

https://www.galleriaverrengia.it/facing-histories-2023-yumi-karasumaru/
"Woven つむぐ- vol.2 ", GALLERIE CENTENNIAL, Osaka, Japan
http://www.14thmoon.com/blog/c/centennial.cgi?date=2023.07.26
Facing Histories 2023」、La Galleria Paola Verrengia, Salerno, Italy
https://www.galleriaverrengia.it/facing-histories-2023-yumi-karasumaru/
「つむぐ - vol.2」GALLERIE CENTENNIAL、Osaka, Japan
「温故知新 - Forming new art from classics」KATSUYA SUSUKI GALLERY、Tokyo, Japan
https://www.katsuya-susuki-gallery.com/exhibition/yumikarasumaru-2/

- 2021 「Woven - つむぐ」、KATSUYA SUSUKI GALLERY、Tokyo, Japan

https://www.katsuya-susuki-gallery.com/exhibition/yumikarasumaru/

- 2018 "Facing Histories ", Galleria I VOLPINI, Bologna, Italy
- 2016 "Facing Histories", Bologna Museum of Modern Art (MAMbo),Bologna, Italy
- 2015 "Facing Histories", Roppongi Hills A/D gallery, Tokyo, Japan

"Facing Histories", @Kcua Kyoto City University Arts Art Gallery, Kyoto Japan
"Facing Histories in Hiroshima", Prefectural Gallery, Hiroshima Prefectural Art Museum, Hiroshima, Japan

- 2014 "Spriti evanescenti - Dal Giappone al Marfisa d'Este", Palazzina di Marfisa d'Este, Ferrara, Italy

"Facing Histories", Galerie Houg, Lyon, France

- 2013 "Tokyo – Monogatari", Studio Carlotta Pesce, Bologna, Italy
- 2011 "Tokyo Stories – Vol. 3", Galerie Houg, Lyon, France
- 2010 "It's Our Tokyo Stories", Mizuma Action (Mizuma Art Gallery), Tokyo, Japan
- 2009 "Tokyo Stories", fabioparisartgallery, Brescia, Italy
- 2006 "Bunshin – Everyday Life", Mizuma Action (Mizuma Art Gallery), Tokyo, Japan
- 2005 "Tokyo AGERS", fabioparisartgallery, Brescia, Italy
- 2004 "Facing Histories", Teatro Nuovo Giovanni da Udine, Udine, Italy
- 2002 "Facing Histories", Marcel Scheiner Gallery, Hilton Head Island, United States
- 1999 "Hino Izuru Kuni Yori", Galleria Luigi Franco Arte Contemporanea, Turin, Italy

"Toki No Fuin", Prefectural Gallery, Hiroshima Prefectural Art Museum, Hiroshima, Japan
"Modern Crimes", Viafarini, Milan, Italy

- 1998 "Spazioaperto", Galleria d'Arte Moderna Bologna, Bologna, Italy
- 1996 "Toki No Fuin", Art Forum Gallery, Merano, Italy
- 1995 "Banzai", Galleria Guido Carbone, Turin, Italy

== Selected group exhibitions ==
- 2024 "Padiglione Bologna", Galleria Civica d’Arte Contemporanea MuVi, Viadana (MN), Italy
- 2023 "IMAGE", Link Studio Arte, Bologna, Italy
- 2021 "+Divenire. Dove inizia il numero di esodo", Corciano Festival, Corciano, Italy
- 2019 "Turn over #1", Galleria Paola Verrengia, Salerno, Italy
- 2018 "Lari- gli spiriti protettori della casa", Triennale di Milano, Superstudio, Milan, Italy

"EX-NOVO", Fondazione Plart, Naples, Italy

- 2017 "Roberto Daolio – vita e incontri un criticod’arte attraverso le opere di una collezione non intenzionale"

Museo d’Arte Moderna di Bologna (MAMbo), Bologna, Italy

- 2016 "Tam Tam: Normali Meraviglie, la Mano", Triennale di Milano

"La Casa do ut do – Art for Hospice – i valori dell’abitare", Pinacoteca Nazionale di Bologna, Bologna, Italy

- 2015 "Silent @Kcua" – @Kcua Kyoto City University Arts Art Gallery, Kyoto, Japan
- 2014 "Shown Or To Be Shown", Galerie Houg, Lyon France
- 2012 "Do ut do – Art for Hospice", Spazio Carbonesi, Bologna, Italy
- 2009 "Run, Jump and Throw – Athletics in international Contemporary Art", the Berlin City Hall, Berlin, Germany

"Second Skin" Spazio Paraggi, Treviso, Italy

- 2007 "Red Hot – Asian Art Today from the Chaney Family Collection", The Museum of Fine Arts, Houston, U.S.A.
- 2006 "La Donna Oggetto – Miti e metamorfosi al femminile 1900-2005", Castello di Vigevano, Vigevano, Italy
- 2005 "Chronos – il tempo nell'arte dall'epoca barocca all'eta contemporanea", Il Filatoio, Caraglio, Italy

"Altre Lilith – Le Vestali dell’Arte – Terzo Millennio"Scuderie Aldobrandini per l’Arte, Frascati, Italy
"Bologna COntemporanea", Galleria d'Arte Moderna di Bologna, Bologna, Italy
"XIV Quadriennale di Roma", Galleria Nazionale d'Arte Moderna di Roma, Rome, Italy

- 2004 "Far East – Volume 1, Yu Hirai + Yumi Karasumaru", Agenzia04, Bologna, Italy

"Comunita – Community", Premio Internazionale d'Arte "Ermanno Casoli settima edizione" Cartoteca Storica Regionale, Serra San Quirico, Italy
"Female Dignity – Inszenierung der Weiblichkeit in der modernen Kunst", Schloss Ulmerfeld, Ulmerfeld, Austria
"Officina Asia", Galleria d'arte Ex-Pescheria, Cesena, Italy

- 2003 "Muta. Menti & Mut. Azioni", D406 Galleria d'arte contemporanea, Modena, Italy
- 2002 "Small Works", Marcel Scheiner Gallery, Hilton Head Island, U.S.A.

"Lavori Domestici", Via Magenta,14, Varese, Italy
"Mountain Way – I sentieri dell'arte per la montagna", Palazzo Frisacco, Tolmezzo

- 2001 "Tutto l'odio del Mondo", Palazzo dell' Arengario, Milan

"Auguri d'Artista 2001", Mart Palazzo delle Albere, Trento, Italy
"Groupshow", Marcel Scheiner Gallery, Hilton Head Island, U.S.A.
"Figure del Novecento 2. Oltre l'Accademia", Accademia di Belle Arti di Bologna, Bologna, Italy
"My Opinion", Palazzo Lanfranchi, Pisa, Italy

- 2000 "Insights", Fondazione Adriano Olivetti, Rome, Italy

== Selected performances ==
- 2024 "The Storyteller, Il narratore - Pro-memoria di Onoda, Last samurai",

on May 10 at Alchemilla Palazzo Vizzani, Bologna, Italy
"The Storyteller, Il narratore - The Double Pop Songs",
on May 19, 22 at Alchemilla Palazzo Vizzani, Bologna, Italy
https://www.youtube.com/watch?v=4VljCD50tcI&t=1s
"The Storyteller, Il narratore - Brave Storie del Giappone in tre quadri e 93 parole",
on February 1 and 3 at L’Ariete artecontemporanea, Bologna, Italy
https://www.galleriaariete.it/2024/01/21/yumi-karasumaru/

- 2023 “The Storyteller, Il narratore - The Double Pop Songs for Salerno 2023",

on 18 November at Galleria Paola Verrengia, Salerno, Italy
https://www.youtube.com/watch?v=7gaN1xrqNo4

- 2020 "The Storyteller, il narratore 2020 - Kodanshi per la Galleria de’foscherari",

Museo d’Arte Moderna di Bologna (MAMbo), 20 September, Bologna, Italy
https://www.youtube.com/watch?v=uvGoK_gFtyY
"Yumi-transformer, Life changing program 2020-2021"
on 24 and 25 June at Galleria de’ foscherari, Bologna, Italy
https://www.youtube.com/watch?v=2JWwCyBl26c
https://www.youtube.com/watch?v=mD5UIW7ltHw
"The Story-teller, il narratore 2020 – Il nome di quell’uomo è Pasquale " ,
at Galleria de Foscherari, Bologna, Italy
"Yumi-transformer, Life changing program 2020-2021" on 24 and 25 June at Galleria de’ foscherari, Bologna, Italy
"The Story-teller, il narratore 2020 – Il nome di quell’uomo è Pasquale",
on 24 January at Galleria de’ foscherari, Bologna, Italy

- 2019 "The Bumper Car Kodanshi - Circolare", at the amusement park, Baggio, Milano, Italy

"The Story-teller, Kataribe 2019 – Make yourself at home", from 1 to 3 February, at artist’s home studio, in the program of ART CITY – Arte Fiera 2019, Bologna, Italy

- 2018 "The Story-teller, Il narratore 2018 – The Four Pop Songs" at I VOLPINI for ArtCity

Bologna, 31 January, Bologna, Italy

- 2017 "Facing Histories in Hiroshima- versione speciale per Torino 2017", Museo Ettore Fico,

4 November, Turin, Italy
"Story-teller, il narratore-special version for Naples 2017", at Palazzo Caracciolo di San Teodoro in Naples, 15 June, Naples, Italy

- 2016 "Facing Histories in Hiroshima", Museo d’Arte Moderna di Bologna(MAMbo), 6 August,

Bologna, Italy

- 2015 "Facing Histories in Hiroshima", @Kcua Kyoto City University Arts Art Gallery, 6, 9

August, Kyoto Japan
"Facing Histories in Hiroshima", at Ateliersi, Bologna, Italy

- 2014 "Korosù-to Kill – Special version for, Marfisa 2014",

at Palazzina Marfisa d'Este in Ferrara, Italy
"The Story-Teller, Kataribe 2014", at Galerie Houg, Lyon, France

- 2013 "The Story-Teller, il narratore", at Studio Carlotta Pesce, Bologna, Italy

"The Story-Teller, il narratore", "KOROSù-to Kill" at Ex-chiesa di San Mattia, Bologna
( the event of Arte Fiera – ArtcCity Bologna)

- 2011 "The Story-Teller", at Gallerie Houg, Lyon, France
- 2010 "The Story-Teller", at Mizuma Action (Mizuma Art Gallery), Tokyo
- 2009 "The Story-Teller", at Coin department store, Treviso

"The Story-Teller", at fabioparisartgallery, Brescia

- 2006 "Koros-Aikiru (I Kill)", at Mizuma Action (Mizuma Art Gallery), Tokyo
- 2002 "Facing Histories", Marcel Scheiner Gallery, Hilton Head Island, USA
- 2001 "Kataribe – the narater" ( Domestic Art ), at Dt. G. Masini & Dr. M. Paoletti,

16 September, Pisa

- 2000 "Insights – glimpses and actions between public and private spaces",

Fondazione Adriano Olivetti, Rome
"Bunshin", Galleria Civicadi Arte Contemporanea Trento, Trento
"Serata Fluxus", Chiostri di S. Domenico - ex Stalloni, Reggio Emilia

- 1999 "Bunshin", Galleria Luigi Franco Arte Contemporanea, Turin

"Domestic Art on Tour", at Dr. M. De Michelis & Dr.A Kohlmayer, 18 May, Venice
"Domestic Art on Tour", at Dr. Gemma De Angelis Testa, 2Oth of April, Turin
"Domestic Art on Tour", at Dr. Ruben Levi, 24 February, Turin
"Domestic Art on Tour", at Dr. Claudio Guenzani, 11 February, Milan

- 1998 "Domestic Art on Tour", at Dr. Patrizia Brusarosco (Via Farini), 16 December, Milan

"Short Story of Japan", Sancarlino Theater – Brescia Music Art Festival – Brescia
Television program "Le Notti dell'Angelo", Italia 1

== Books ==
- 2016 "Korosu – Io Uccido – コロス- I Kill" Kappa Edizioni
- 2015 "Facing Histories – フェーシング・ヒストリーズ 烏丸由美 "Pubblicato da Facing Histories Committee
