= Giulia della Rovere =

Italian noblewoman (1531–1563)

Giulia della Rovere (1531, Casteldurante – 4 April 1563, Ferrara) was an Italian noblewoman.

== Life ==
Guilia was the daughter of Francesco Maria I della Rovere, Duke of Urbino and Eleonora Gonzaga. On 3 January 1549 she married Alfonso d'Este, an illegitimate son of Alfonso I d'Este, Duke of Ferrara, and of Laura Dianti. They had:

- Cesare, Duke of Modena (8 October 1552 – 11 December 1628); married Virginia de' Medici
- Alfonsino (14 November 1560 – 4 September 1578), married his cousin Marfisa d'Este
- Eleonora (Ferrara, 1561–Naples, 1637); married the composer Carlo Gesualdo.

== Sources ==
- Piperno, Franco (2024). "Negotiating Identity and Status: Musicalia in the Relational Strategies of Duke Guidubaldo II della Rovere". In Hatzikiriakos, Alexandros Maria; Borghetti, Vincenzo (eds.). The Media of Secular Music in the Medieval and Early Modern Period (1100–1650). Taylor & Francis. ISBN 9781040021064.
- Stras, Laurie (2012). "The Ricreationi per monache of Suor Annalena Aldobrandini". Renaissance Studies. 26 (1): 34–59. doi:10.1111/j.1477-4658.2011.00789.x. ISSN 0269-1213.
- Varese, Ranieri, ed. (2009). Immagine dell'invisibile spiritualità e iconografia devozionale nella chiesa di Ferrara-Comacchio (in Italian). Diabasis.
- Verstegen, Ian, ed. (2007). Patronage and Dynasty: The Rise of the Della Rovere in Renaissance Italy. Truman State University Press. ISBN 978-1-931112-60-4.
