= Alderano Cybo-Malaspina =

Alderano Cybo-Malaspina may refer to:

- Alderano Cybo-Malaspina (1552–1606), Crown prince of Massa and Carrara
- Alderano Cybo-Malaspina (1613–1700), Italian Cardinal
