= Eleonora Gonzaga, Duchess of Urbino =

Duchess of Urbino

- Duchess of Urbino
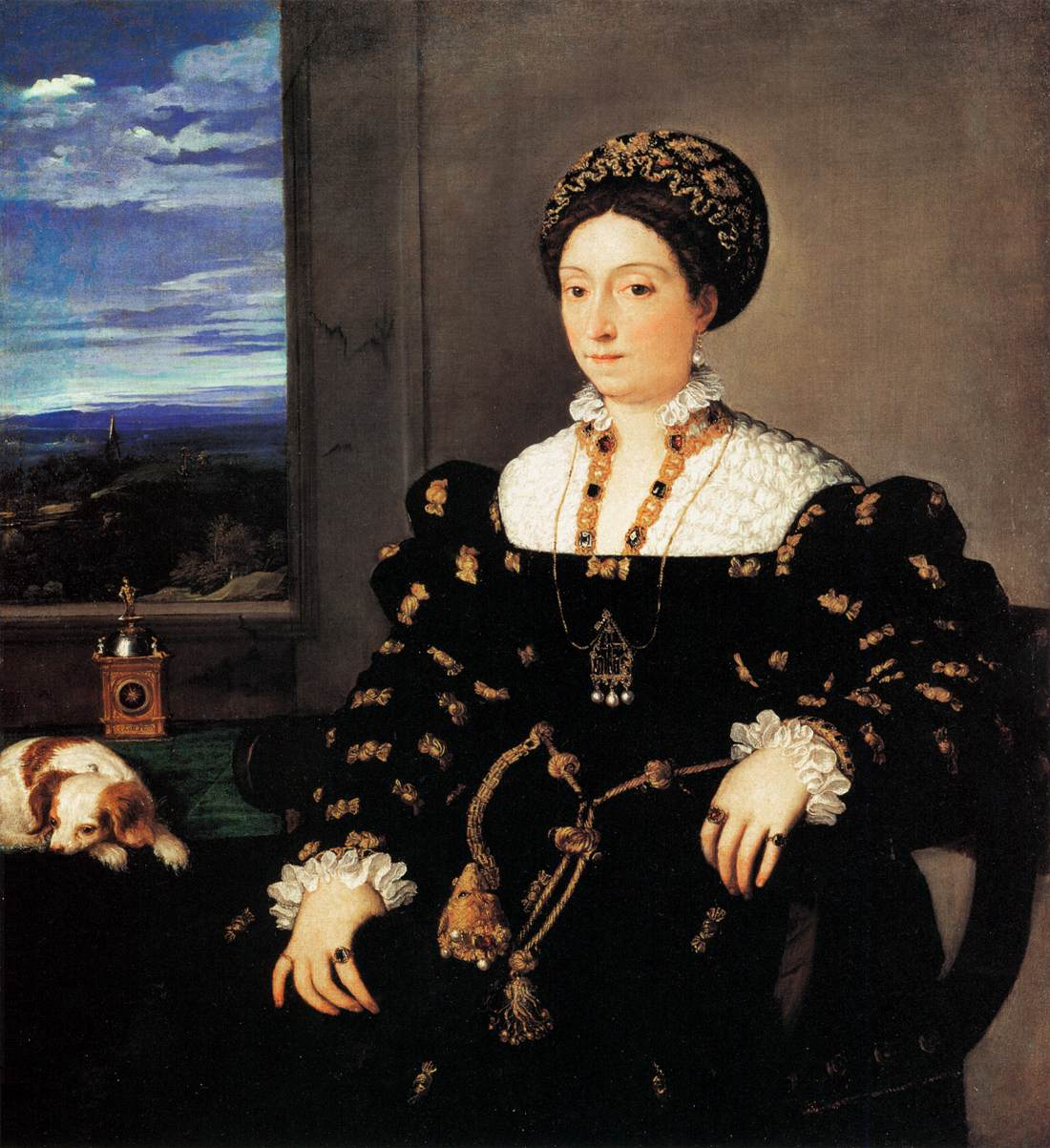
- Portrait of Eleonora della Rovere by Titian, c. 1538, currently at the Uffizi Gallery, Florence, a companion portrait to that of her husband.
- Born: 31 December 1493
- Died: 13 February 1570 (aged 76)
- Noble family: Gonzaga
- Spouse: Francesco Maria I della Rovere
- Issue among others...: Guidobaldo II della Rovere; Giulia, Lady of Montecchio; Giulio, Cardinal of the Catholic Church
- Father: Francesco II Gonzaga, Marquess of Mantua
- Mother: Isabella d'Este

Eleonora Gonzaga, Duchess of Urbino (31 December 1493 – 13 February 1570) was Duchess and for sometime regent of Urbino by marriage to Francesco Maria I della Rovere, duke of Urbino. She served as regent during the absence of her spouse in 1532.

== Life ==
Eleonora was the eldest of the seven children of Francesco II Gonzaga, Marquess of Mantua, and Isabella d'Este. Her father was a libertine, and her mother a patroness of the arts. On 25 September 1509 she married Francesco Maria I della Rovere, duke of Urbino, son of Giovanni della Rovere, duca di Sora e Senegaglia, and Giovanna da Montefeltro, and nephew of Pope Julius II. Their surviving children, two sons and three daughters, would all have progeny.

Eleonora, who was largely responsible for the internal government of Urbino during her husband's exile, was an important patron of the arts in her own right. A princess of the highest culture, she was the friend of Pietro Bembo, Sadolet and Baldassarre Castiglione, as well as Torquato Tasso. Titian painted her once formally, in 1537, a companion to his portrait of her husband Francesco from the same year, but her face appears to be recognisable in three other Titian paintings of about that time: La Bella, Girl in the Fur Cloak and possibly the Venus of Urbino commissioned by her son Guidobaldo.

== Issue ==
By her husband, she had 13 children:

- Federico della Rovere (1511 — died aged two months).
- Guidobaldo II della Rovere (2 April 1514 — 28 September 1574), married Giulia Varano and had issue; married Vittoria Farnese (daughter of Pier Luigi Farnese, Duke of Parma) had issue (ancestors of Maria Teresa Cybo-Malaspina).
- Ippolita della Rovere (1515 — 1561), reportedly married Antonio of Aragon, Duke of Montalto, son of Fernando de Aragón, 1st Duke of Montalto.
- Giovanna della Rovere (1515 — 1518).
- Giovanni della Rovere (1516 — 1518).
- Caterina della Rovere (1518 — 1520).
- Beatrice della Rovere (1521 — 1522).
- Francesco Maria della Rovere (1523 — 1525).
- Maria della Rovere (1527 — 1528).
- Elisabetta della Rovere (1529 — 6 June 1561), married Alberico I Cybo-Malaspina, Marquis of Massa and had issue (ancestors of Maria Teresa Cybo-Malaspina).
- Giulia Feltria della Rovere (1531 — 4 April 1563), married Alfonso d'Este, Lord of Montecchio and had issue (were parents of Cesare d'Este, Duke of Modena).
- Giulio Feltrio della Rovere (1533 — 1578), became a cardinal then later had issue (illegitimate): Ippolito and Giulio.
- Violante della Rovere (1535 — 1538).

== Sources ==
- Boltanski, Ariane (2006). Les Ducs de Nevers et L'etat Royal. Librairie Droz S.A. ISBN 978-2-600-01022-1.
