= Alfonsino d'Este =

Alfonsino d'Este (11 November 1560 – 4 September 1578, Ferrara) was a Ferrarese nobleman, heir apparent to Montecchio Emilia.

== Life ==
Alfonsino was the second son of Alfonso d'Este, marquess of Montecchio, from the Montecchio side-branch of the House of Este, and Giulia Della Rovere.

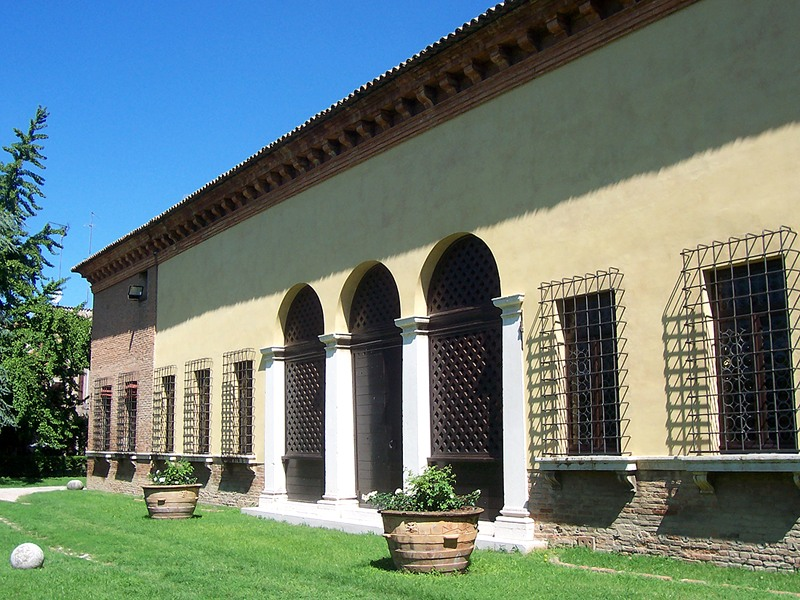
Ferrara, Palazzina di Marfisa d'Este.

Always in ill health, he married his cousin Marfisa d'Este (illegitimate daughter of Francesco d'Este and five years Alfonsino's senior) on 5 May 1578 - her father had died in February that year and the will had stated Alfonsino would only come into his inheritance if he married a member of the Este family. Torquato Tasso wrote his "Già il notturno sereno" (poem, book II, from October 1565 to 11 March 1579). in honour of the wedding. Alfonsino, however, died just under four months after the wedding but Marfisa continued to take part in the court festivities despite also being in mourning. On 3 January 1580 she remarried to Alderano Cybo-Malaspina, hereditary prince of Massa and Carrara.
