= Palazzo Bonacossi =

Coordinates: 44.8320°N 11.6288°E

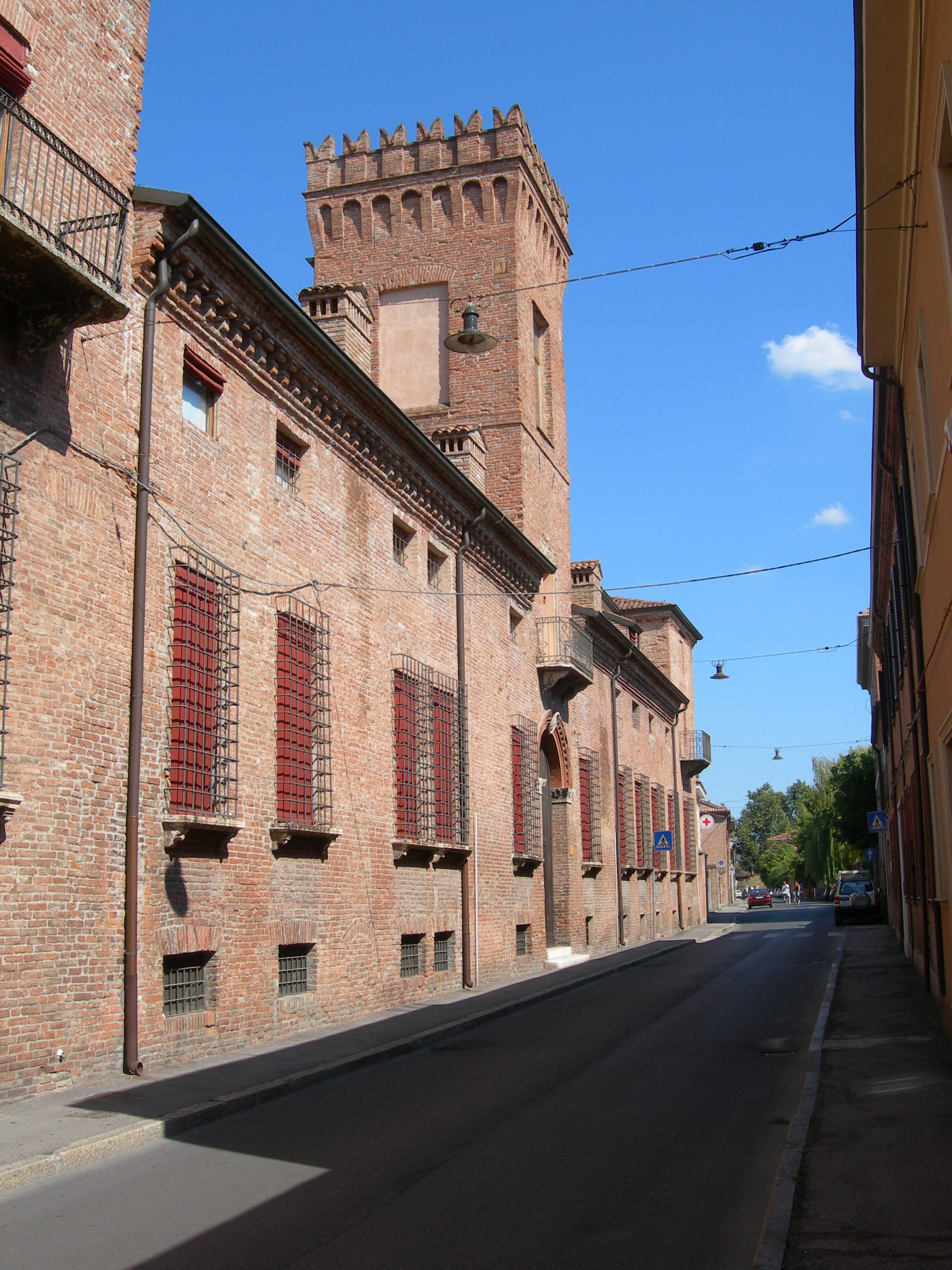
Bonacossi Palace

The Palazzo Bonacossi is a Renaissance architecture palace located on Via Cisterna del Follo #5 in Ferrara, Italy. The 15th-century palace is the home of the Musei Civici di Arte Antica e Museo Riminaldi.

== History ==
The palace was built in 1468 and was given by Borso d’Este to the Florentine exile, Diotisalvi Neroni. A second floor was added in the next century. The palace returned to the property of the Este, via Gurone d’Este, who commissioned the central courtyard from Girolamo da Carpi in 1535. In 1572, it was connected through the gardens with the Palazzina Marfisa d'Este and also with the Palazzo Schifanoia. In 1643 the palaces became property of the Count Bonacossi who refurbished the palace with late Baroque touches.

The palace now houses the art and photography library of the museum. The Museo Riminaldi displays a collection of sculptures, tapestries, and mosaics from the 17th and 18th-century, mostly derived from the collections of cardinal Gian Maria Riminaldi (1718-1789).
