= Carlo I Cybo-Malaspina =

Italian nobleman

- Prince of Massa and Marquis of Carrara
- Depiction of a coin with the effigy of Carlo I Cybo-Malaspina by Giorgio Viani, 1808
- Reign: 1623 - 13 February 1662
- Born: 18 November 1581; Ferrara, Duchy of Ferrara
- Died: 13 February 1662 (aged 80); Genoa
- Noble family: Cybo-Malaspina
- Spouse: Brigida Spinola
- Issue: Alberico II; Marfisa; Maria; Veronica; Alderano; Placidia; Giannettino; Francesco; Lorenzo; Odoardo; Diana; Ricciarda; Domenico; Giovanni
- Father: Alderano Cybo-Malaspina
- Mother: Marfisa d'Este

Carlo I Cybo-Malaspina (18 November 1581 - 13 February 1662) was an Italian nobleman, who was prince of Massa and marquis of Carrara from 1623 until his death.

== Biography ==
Born in Ferrara, he was the son of Alderano Cybo-Malaspina and Marfisa d'Este. He was also Duke of Ferentillo and held other patrician positions in several of the numerous Italian states of the time. In 1605, he married the Genoese noblewoman Brigida Spinola, from whom he had fourteen children:

- Alberico II (23 July 1607, Genoa - 2 February 1960, Massa), who succeeded him as prince in 1662
- Marfisa (17 November 1608, Genoa - 26 March 1612, Genoa)
- Maria (29 December 1609, Genoa - 13 December 1652, Padua), married Galeotto IV Pico della Mirandola, Hereditary Duke of Mirandola in 1626
- Veronica (10 December 1611, Genoa - 5 September 1691, Rome), married Jacopo Salviati, 1st Duke of Giuliano in 1627
- Alderano (16 July 1613, Genoa - 22 July 1700, Rome), a cardinal
- Placidia (15 August 1614, Genoa - 11 March 1683, Naples), married Don Carlo Antonio I de Guevara, fourth Duke of Bovino in 1635
- Giannettino (17 August 1615, Genoa - 30 July 1683, Madrid), Roman and Genoese Patrician
- Francesco (4 November 1616, Genoa - February 1705, Naples), Knight of the Order of Malta from 1625
- Lorenzo (23 April 1618, Genoa - 18 April 1680, Rome), Bishop of Jesi from 1671
- Odoardo (6 December 1619, Genoa - 6 February 1705, Massa), Prefect and Papal governor of Perugia, Ancona, Viterbo, Nocia, Orvieto, Camerino and Sabinabetween 1655 and 1670
- Diana (1 December 1620, Genoa - June 1688, Massa), Poor Clare nun in the Monastery of Sanata Chiara in Massa
- Ricciarda (20 March 1622, Genoa - 1683, Novellara) married Alfonso II Gonzaga sixth Count of Novellara in 1648
- Domenico ( 9 March 1623, Genoa - January 1678, Massa) Abbot of the Illustrious Collegiate Church of San Pietro in 1644
- Giovanni Battista (4 December 1624, Massa - 13 February 1625, Massa) Roman and Genoese Patrician

| Preceded by Alberico I | Prince of Massa and Marquis of Carrara; 1623–1662 | Succeeded by Alberico II |
