= Francesco d'Este (1516–1578) =

Italian nobleman

Francesco d'Este, Marchese di Massa Lombarda (1 November 1516, Ferrara – 12 February 1578, Ferrara) was an Italian nobleman from the House of Este. He was the eighth child and fifth son of Alfonso I d'Este and his second wife Lucrezia Borgia.

== Life ==
He grew up in Ferrara and lost his mother at age three when she died giving birth to Isabella Maria d'Este. As was customary for a younger son, he was given a military education. After spending time in France, his brother Ercole II d'Este invited him to help Charles V, Holy Roman Emperor in Lombardy in May 1536 as a captain of light cavalry. He also took part in the 1541 Algiers expedition.

He married Maria de Cardona, marchioness of Padula and countess of Avellino, who had been a widow since the death of her cousin and first husband Artale de Cardona in 1536. Charles V backed her marriage to Francesco in a letter to Maria. The couple had no children but Francesco had two illegitimate daughters by one mother, whose name is unknown - Marfisa (c.1554-16 August 1608) and Bradamante (1559–1624). Both Marfisa and Bradamante were made legitimate a few years after their birth by Pope Gregory XIII and by Alfonso II d'Este. Marfisa married her cousin Alfonsino in 1578, but he died only months after the marriage - in 1580 she remarried to Alderano Cybo-Malaspina. Bradamante married count Ercole Bevilacqua, Count of Maccastorna.

In 1544 Pope Paul III nominated Francesco marquess of Massa Lombarda (also known as Massa), with instructions to pass the title onto his male heirs and a faculty to mint coins. A mint has been found near the fortress at Massa, with intense activity that ended in 1573. In 1547 Francesco and his wife were given permission to open ironworks in the feudal lands of Avellino and Candida. They were also authorized to hold an annual fair in Avellino by Charles V. Francesco was later in the service of Henry II of France, who made him his lieutenant and ordered him to defend the republic of Montalcino, last bulwark of the Republic of Siena.

Francesco later returned to his birthplace, acquired a palace, remodelled its gardens and added several buildings, most notably the so-called Palazzina di Marfisa d'Este, built in 1559 and left to his eldest daughter in his will. He died on 12 February 1578 aged 62 and as stipulated in his will was buried in the church of San Paolo in Massa. He had no surviving male heir and so the marquisate was re-incorporated into the duchy of Ferrara.

== Bibliography ==
- Lorenzo Bellesia, Le monete di Francesco d'Este, Astarte, Lugano 1997.
- Luciano Chiappini, Gli Estensi, dall'Oglio, Milano 1967.
- Sarah Bradford, Lucrezia Borgia, Mondadori, Milano 2005 ISBN 88-04-55627-7.
- Mario Tabanelli, Questa è <<la Massa>>, Lega, Faenza 1972.
