= Portrait of Laura Dianti =

Painting by Titian

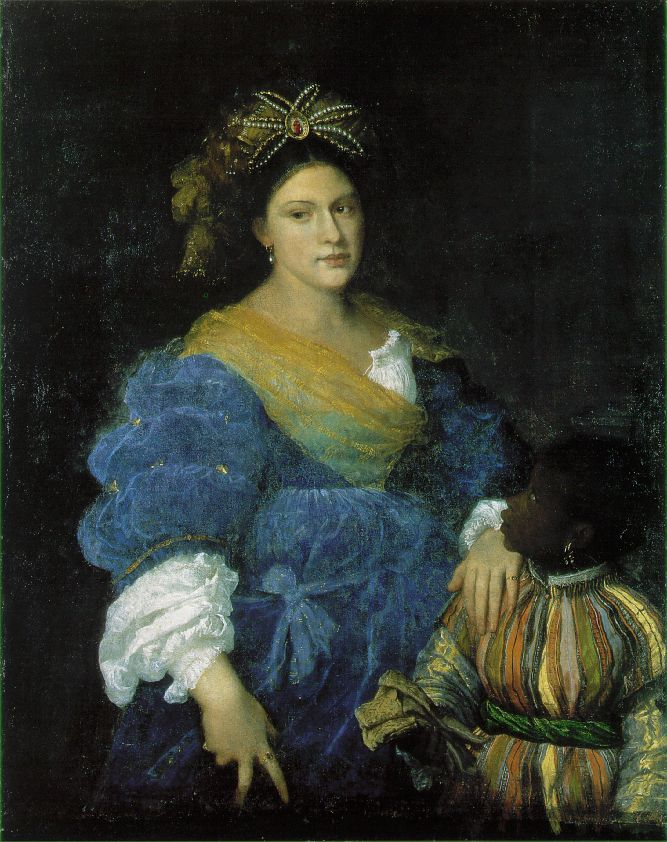
- Artist: Titian
- Year: c. 1520–25
- Medium: oil on canvas
- Dimensions: 119 cm × 93 cm (47 in × 37 in)
- Location: Collezione H. Kisters, Kreuzlingen

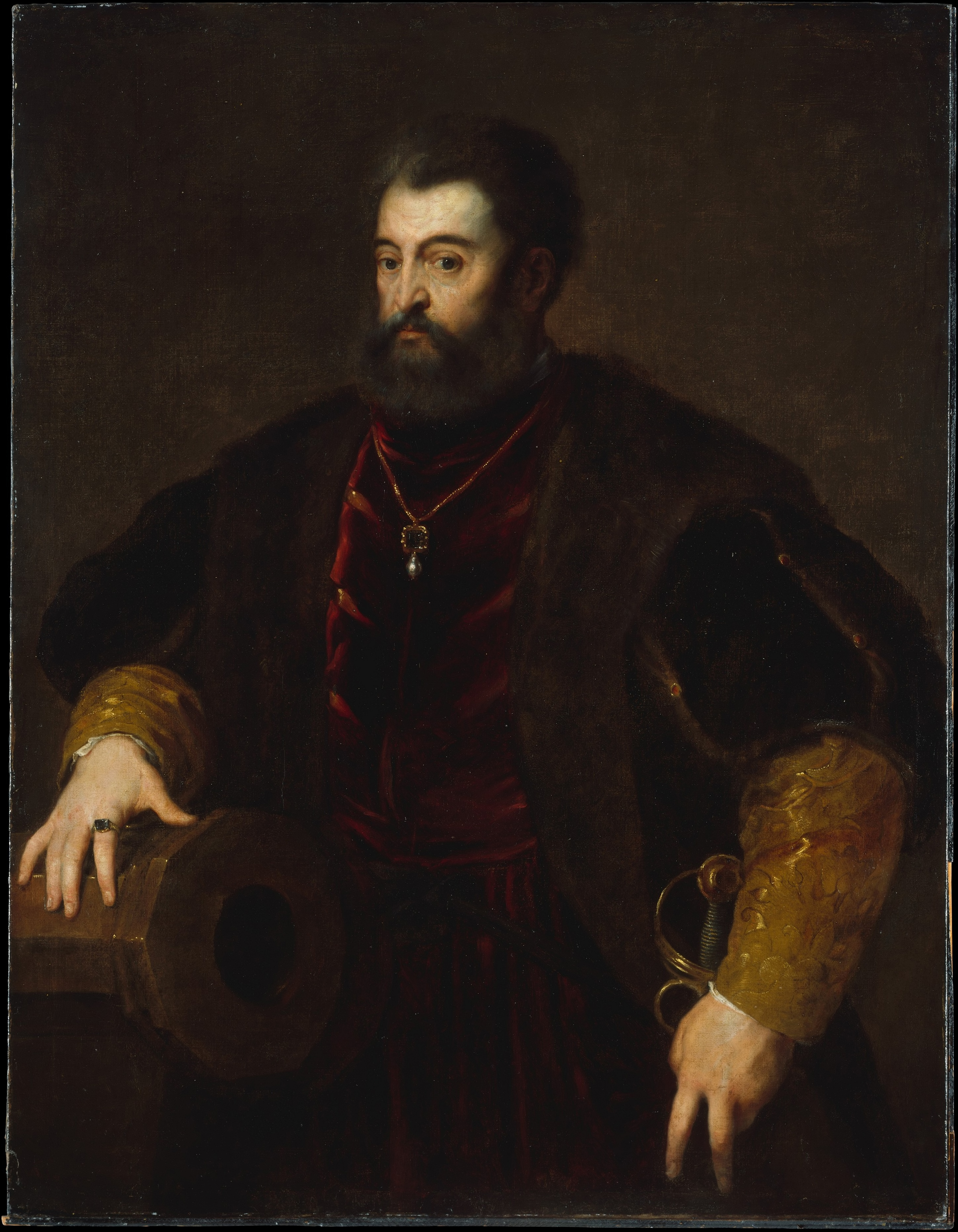
The Portrait of Alfonso I d'Este that is assumed to be a companion to the Portrait of Laura Dianti

Portrait of Laura Dianti is a c. 1520–25 painting by Titian, now held in the H. Kisters Collection at Kreuzlingen. It is signed "TICI/ANVS F." The portrait features Laura Dianti, who was first the mistress, and later became the wife of the Duke of Ferrara Alfonso I d'Este. In the portrait, she is wearing a blue dress and her hand rests upon the shoulder of an African page, who looks up at her. The painting is possibly associated with a portrait of Alfonso I d'Este. It is also controversial in that it was used to contest the legitimacy of the pair's marriage after the duke's death. It traveled through many locations and was initially thought to be one of many copies until a restoration uncovered a signature by Titian.

== Description ==
The painting depicts a woman with brown hair wearing an ornate headpiece made of cloth and jewels, while her earrings were in the shape of a teardrop pearl. Her gaze looks directly at the viewer. At the center of the headpiece lays a small brooch with the appearance of a figure draped in a red garb. Her dress is a sweeping satin-like blue adorned with delicate gold embellishments and white layered sleeves of a chemise that drapes through to her wrist. Across her chest lays a golden colored sash that goes around to her back. The woman's hand is placed on the shoulder of a small African child as he looks up towards her in response to her touch. The child is dressed in a colorful jacket of yellows, oranges and greens with a green sash tied at the waist. He is wearing a curled gold earring. In his hands, he holds a pair of gloves. The background of the painting is a warm darkness that has a soft illumination around the figures, but does not portray any specific location.

This piece is commonly thought to be a companion piece to the Portrait of Alfonso I d'Este, as evidenced by the similar composition. When displayed next to each other, both figures would face inward towards one another and they both portray a similar sense of balance. Laura leans on an African page boy while Alfonso leans into a piece of military artillery. This theory is contested, however, by the fact that the two portraits are differently sized with the Portrait of Laura Dianti being the larger canvas.

== History ==
=== Provenance ===
Vasari mentions a portrait of Dianti, which was engraved by E. Sadler. Ridolfi, in 1648. There are several copies and versions of the painting, one of which (generally thought to be the autograph version) was sent in 1599, from Cesare d'Este to Rudolph II, Holy Roman Emperor in Prague. In 1649, it was in the collection of Christina of Sweden, who brought it to Rome in 1654. It then passed into the collections of Decio Azzolino, then in 1686 of prince Odescalchi, then in 1721, Philip of Orleans. In 1800, it was in an English collection and in 1876, it was in the Cook collection before arriving in the Kisters collection in Kreuzlingen.

=== Authenticity and Restoration ===
It was thought that a total of 6 copies survived around the world and it was possible that the original could have been swapped out at any time during its many exchanges through hands. One duplicate is said to be produced by Ludovico Carracci. It was commonly thought that the Kreuzlingen painting was one of many copies painted after the original, but after a restoration in the United States, an authentic signature was discovered and it was determined that this was in fact the autograph work.

=== Marriage Authentication Controversy ===
The portrait was used as evidence to the courts in the 1640s, by Francesco I d'Este, the great-great grandchild of Alfonso I d'Este and Laura Dianti through their son, also named Alfonso. Although it would have been allowed by the Church, there was no written record at the time that Duke of Ferrara took Laura as his third wife after the death of his second, Lucrezia Borgia. This painting was used as a point of contention by the Este House who argued against the legitimacy of their relationship. Their argument was based on Issues pertaining to her manner of dress and the treatment of the portrait. The estate argued that Laura's clothes suggested lustful implications that were not compatible with other portraits of wives within the family. They also argued that the two were not wed because Laura's portrait was not displayed among the other portraits of wives of the family which were kept in Ferrara. Francesco's counter-argument was that because the painting was done before their marriage, it should not be counted as evidence against the event occurring and that it was the family's refusal to recognize the marriage that caused the portrait to be displayed elsewhere, not Alfonso I.

== Iconography ==
=== African Page ===
There are a few interpretations of the child in the Portrait of Laura Dianti. Art historian Mary Rogers argues that the figure can be seen as an interpretation of her high social status. It was not uncommon at this time for women of high status to be portrayed with African pages at their side. Other interpretations include Rona Goffen's assertion that the child represents a chaperone for the mistress. The intent of the chaperone image is to promote against the possible lustful gaze of men by attaching a child to the image. The child's gaze to Laura Dianti, however, invites the viewer to do the same but in a more appropriate adoring manner.

=== Badge ===
She wears a hat badge with a figure in red, which historian Paul Kaplan states is a color often associated with St. Jerome. This badge can be considered a reference to her other name, Eustochia. However, art historian Peter Humfrey argues that because of the lack of a cardinal hat on the figure, it could not be St. Jerome and that the figure is non-representative.

== Identity of Figures ==
=== Laura Dianti ===
It was previously thought that the woman figure in the portrait was the second wife of Alfonso I d'Este, Lucretia Borgia, however it was later determined by art historian, Carl Justi to be his third wife, Lof St. Jerome and addressee of a famed letter penned by him about virginity.

Laura Dianti first modeled for Titian in a painting titled, Girl with a Fur, and was known to be "the most gracious strumpet in art" for her depiction in Flora, also by Titian. According to Muriel Segal, the two met in Venice while he traveled with his family to his sister's house in the suburbs of the city. At the time of their meeting, she was the lover of the Duke of Ferrara, Alfonso I d'Este, and although considered lower-class, she gained the respect of the people around her and was a member of the Ferrarese court. After the Duke's second wife died in 1519, it is assumed that he and Laura married and she became the duchess of Ferrara. It is debated by art historians whether this portrait was painted before or after their marriage. Even though she had the air of respect, she was treated differently from the other wives of the Duke of Ferrara. She lived in a separate residence from the family palace and once he died in 1573, she was buried in Sant Augostino of Ferrara, separate from the other members of the d'Este family.

== See also ==
- List of works by Titian
