= Bradamante d'Este =

Italian noblewoman

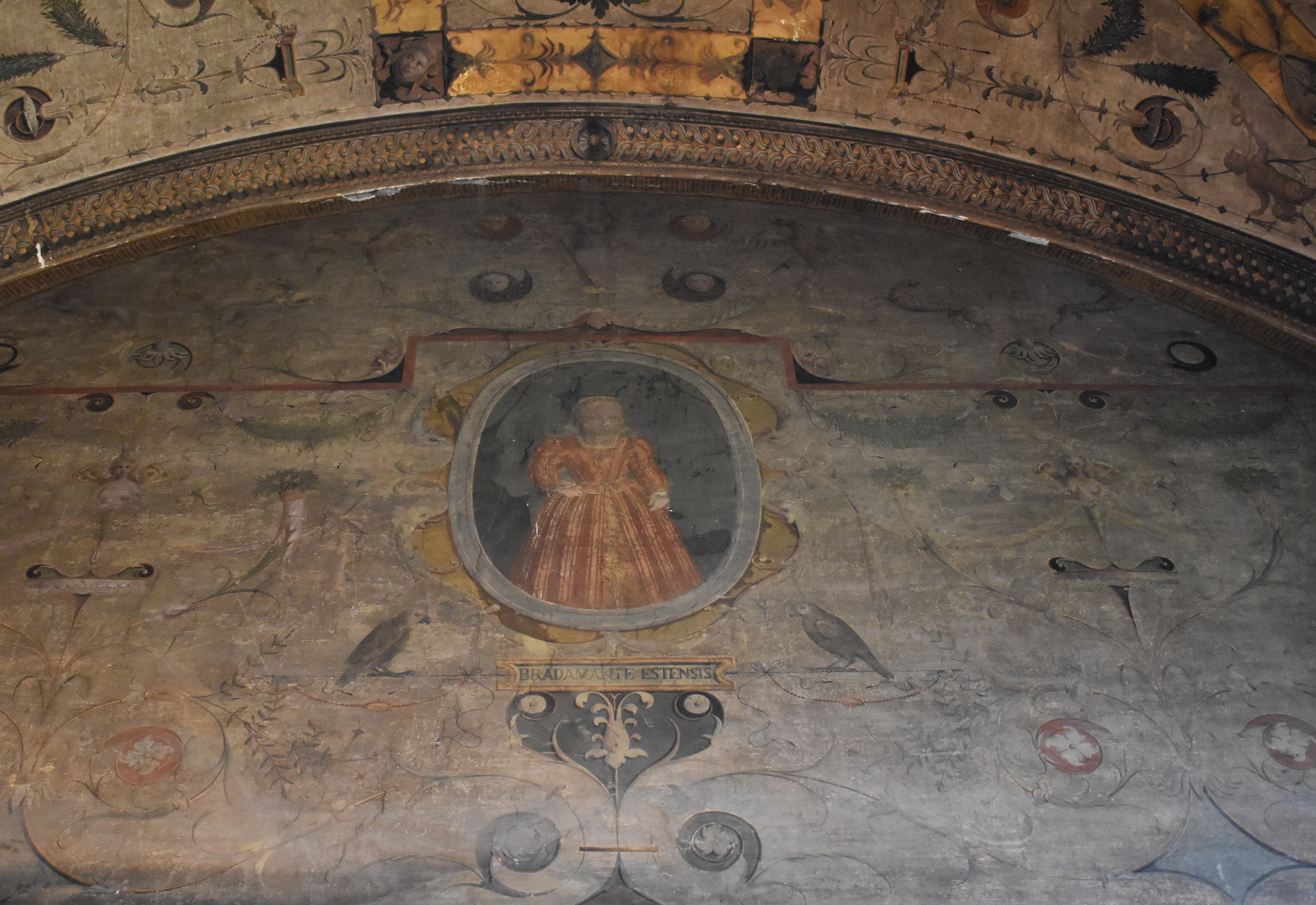
Portrait of Bradamante d'Este, Palazzina di Marfisa d'Este (1559)

Bradamante d'Este, Countess of Maccastorna (1550 - 1624, Ferrara) was an Italian noblewoman from the House of Este.

== Biography ==
She and her elder sister Marfisa were illegitimate daughters of Francesco d'Este, though were legitimated a few years after their birth by both pope Gregory XIII and by Alfonso II d'Este. In 1575 Bradamante married Ercole Bevilacqua, Count of Maccastorna, privy councillor and state and military advisor to Alfonso II d'Este, Duke of Ferrara. In 1590 her husband had to leave Ferrara after Ercole Trotti suspected Bevilacqua of having an affair with Trotti's wife Anna Guarini, a court singer. Bradamante remained in Ferrara while her husband settled in Sassuolo. He only returned to Ferrara in 1598 after Alfonso's death and Ferrara's incorporation into the Papal States, thanks to intercession from cardinal Bonifazio Bevilacqua Aldobrandini, a relation.

== Children ==
Bradamante and Ercole had twelve children:

- Ernesto (1578-1624), soldier in the service of the Este family, 1st Marquess of Bismantova and count of Maccastorna
- Carlo (1579-1640), monk
- Eleonora (1580-?)
- Francesco (1585-1629), soldier in the service of the Este family, 2nd Marquess of Bismantova and count of Maccastorna
- Lucrezia (1587-1607)
- Alessandro (1588-1606, count of Maccastorna
- Camillo (1590-1593), count of Maccastorna
- Sigismondo (1591-1607), Knight of Malta
- Eleonora (1593-?), nun
- Camilla (1595-?)
- Camillo (1597-1645), count of Maccastorna and soldier in the service of the Este family
- Margherita, nun

== Bibliography ==
- Pompeo Litta, Famiglie celebri d'Italia. D'Este, Torino, 1835.
- Luciano Chiappini, Gli Estensi, Varese, 1988.
- Luigi Ughi, Dizionario storico degli uomini illustri ferraresi, Ferrara, 1804.
