= Portrait of Francesco Maria della Rovere (Giorgione) =

Painting attributed to Giorgione

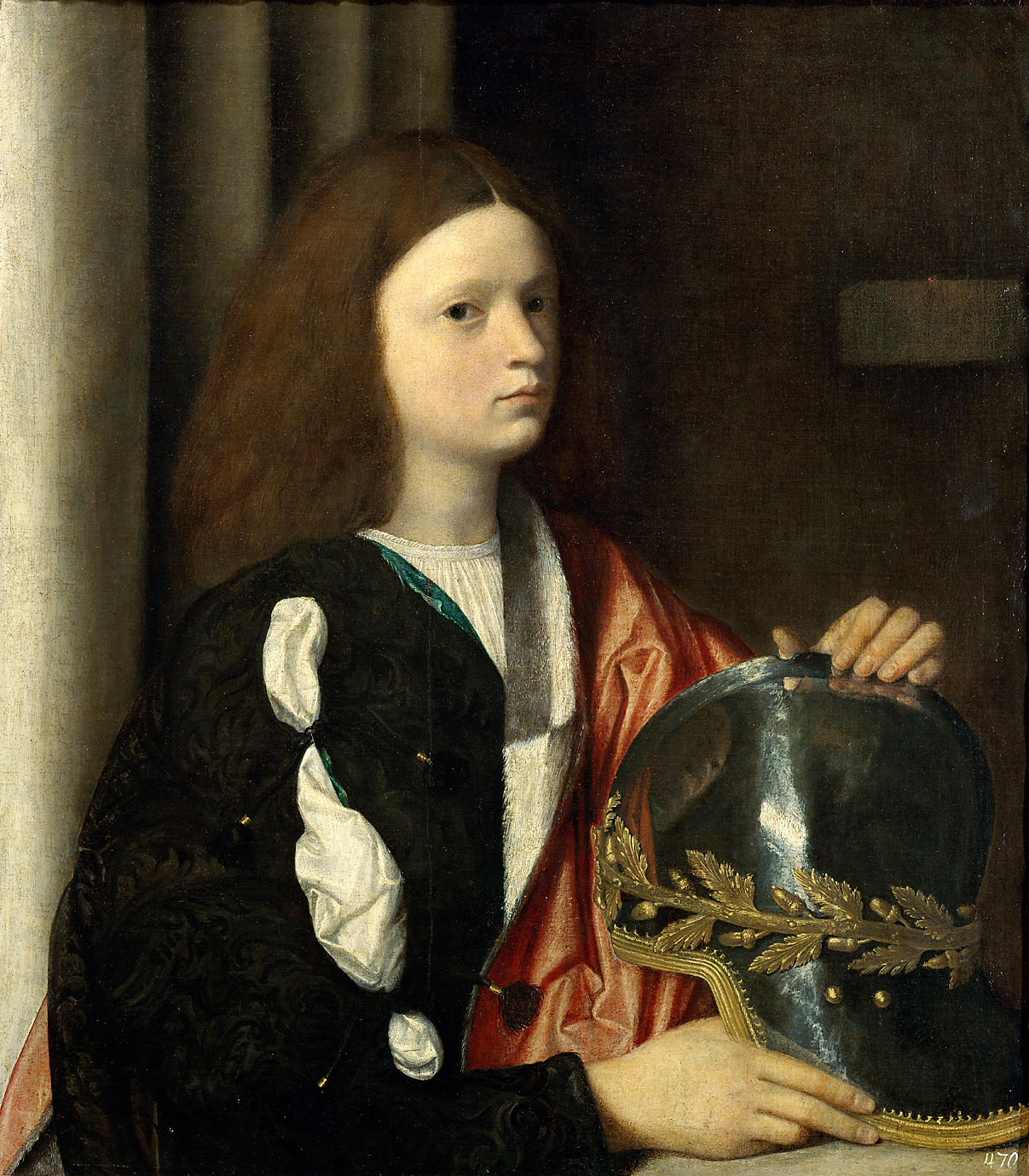
- Artist: Attributed to Giorgione
- Medium: oil on panel, later transferred to canvas
- Dimensions: 73 cm × 64 cm (29 in × 25 in)
- Location: Kunsthistorisches Museum, Vienna

Portrait of Francesco Maria della Rovere is an oil-on-panel, later transferred to canvas, painting attributed to the Italian Renaissance artist Giorgione, executed c. 1502. It is now housed in the Kunsthistorisches Museum in Vienna. It depicts Francesco Maria I della Rovere, Duke of Urbino aged about 13.
