= Ercole Bevilacqua =

Italian nobleman

Ercole Bevilacqua'
- Born: 1554
- Died: 13 December 1600 (aged 45–46); Ferrara
- Occupation: Nobleman

Ercole Bevilacqua, Count of Maccastorna (1554 – 13 December 1600 in Ferrara) was an Italian nobleman, soldier and statesman.

== Life ==
His parents were Ercole Bevilacqua (1528-1553), count of Maccastorna and Eleonora Pio of Savoy (?-1596). He grew up at the court of cardinal Luigi d'Este and in 1574 fought in Flanders for Charles IX of France. He held important positions for the Este family (including privy counsellor and military and political advisor to Alfonso II d'Este) and finally in 1575 married into the family via Francesco d'Este's illegitimate daughter Bradamante d'Este (1550-1624). This also brought a rich dowry into the Bevilacqua family.

In 1590 he had to leave Ferrara being suspected by Ercole Trotti of having an affair with Trotti's wife Anna Guarini, a court singer. Bradamante remained in Ferrara while her husband settled in Sassuolo. He only returned to Ferrara in 1598 after Alfonso's death and Ferrara's incorporation into the Papal States, thanks to intercession from cardinal Bonifazio Bevilacqua Aldobrandini, a relation.

== Children ==
Bradamante and Ercole had twelve children:

- Ernesto (1578-1624), soldier in the service of the Este family, 1st Marquess of Bismantova and count of Maccastorna
- Carlo (1579-1640), monk
- Eleonora (1580-?)
- Francesco (1585-1629), soldier in the service of the Este family, 2nd Marquess of Bismantova and count of Maccastorna
- Lucrezia (1587-1607)
- Alessandro (1588-1606, count of Maccastorna
- Camillo (1590-1593), count of Maccastorna
- Sigismondo (1591-1607), Knight of Malta
- Eleonora (1593-?), nun
- Camilla (1595-?)
- Camillo (1597-1645), count of Maccastorna and soldier in the service of the Este family
- Margherita, nun

== Bibliography ==
- Litta Biumi, Pompeo. Famiglie celebri italiane (in Italian). Milano: Luciano Basadonna Editore.
- Luciano Chiappini, Gli Estensi, Varese, 1988.
- Luigi Ughi, Dizionario storico degli uomini illustri ferraresi, Ferrara, 1804.
