= Giulio della Rovere =

Italian Cardinal

His Eminence Giulio della Rovere
- Metropolitan Archbishop of Ravenna
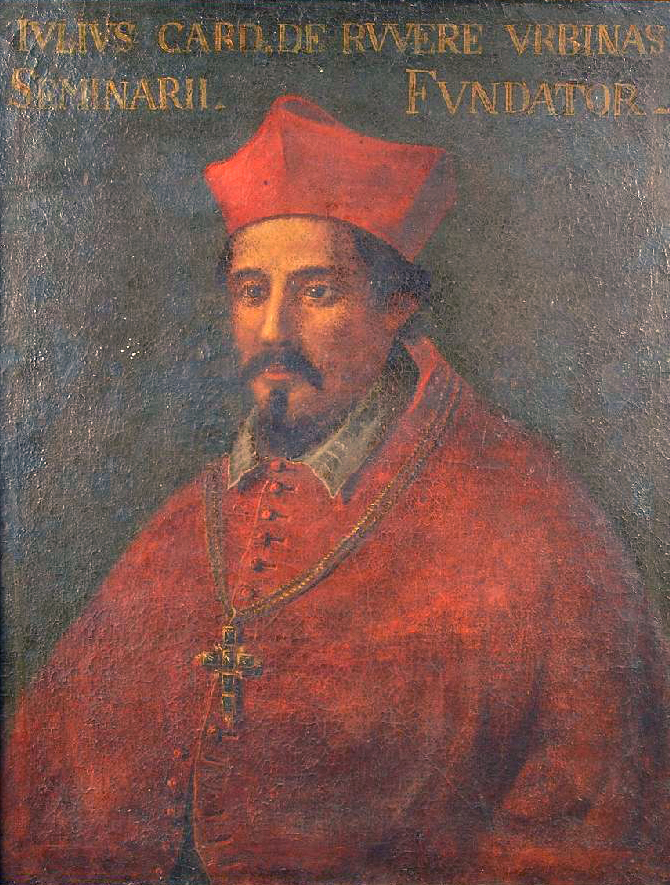
- Portrait of Cardinal Giulio della Rovere.
- Church: Catholic Church
- Archdiocese: Ravenna
- Elected: 6 March 1566
- Term ended: 3 September 1578
- Predecessor: Ranuccio Farnese
- Successor: Cristoforo Boncampagni

Orders
- Ordination: ?
- Consecration: 15 April 1566 by Alessandro Farnese
- Created cardinal: 27 July 1547 by Paul III
- Rank: Cardinal-Bishop

Personal details
- Born: April 5, 1533 Urbino, Papal States
- Died: September 3, 1578 (aged 45) Fossombrone, Papal States
- Buried: Monastery of Santa Chiara, Urbino
- Parents: Francesco Maria; Eleonora Gonzaga
- Children: Maria; Ippolito; Giuliano
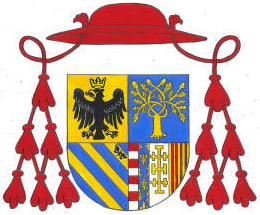
- Coat of arms: Giulio della Rovere's coat of arms

Ordination history of Giulio della Rovere
History
Episcopal consecration
- Consecrated by: Alessandro Farnese
Cardinalate
- Elevated by: Paul III
Episcopal succession
Bishops consecrated by Giulio della Rovere as principal consecrator
- Giovanni Oliva: 25 January 1568
- Alessandro Mazza: 1569

Giulio della Rovere, also known as Giulio Feltrio della Rovere (5 April 1533 – 3 September 1578), was an Italian Cardinal of the Catholic Church and a member of the della Rovere family.

Della Rovere was the second son of Francesco Maria I della Rovere and Eleonora Gonzaga and the younger brother of Guidobaldo II della Rovere, Duke of Urbino.

Della Rovere was elevated to cardinal in 1548 at the age of 13.

He had two illegitimate sons: Ippolito and Giuliano. Both were later legitimised, as were their children, by Pope Pius V in 1572. Ippolito was made Marchese di San Lorenzo.

== Episcopal succession ==
While bishop, he was the principal consecrator of Giovanni Oliva, Archbishop of Chieti (1568); and Alessandro Mazza, Bishop of Fossombrone (1569).

== Sources ==
- Dennistoun, James (1851). Memoirs of the Dukes of Urbino. Vol. III. London: Longman, Brown, Green & Longmans 1851, pp. 76-77.
- Sanfilippo, Matteo (1989). "Della Rovere, Giulio Feltrio." (in Italian). In: Dizionario Biografico degli Italiani Volume 37 (1989).
- Ligi, B. (1953). I vescovi e arcivescovi di Urbino. (in Italian). Urbino 1953, pp. 145-52.
- Miranda, Salvador. "DELLA ROVERE, Giulio (1533-1578)". The Cardinals of the Holy Roman Church. Florida International University. OCLC 53276621.
