= Laura Dianti =

16th-century Italian woman

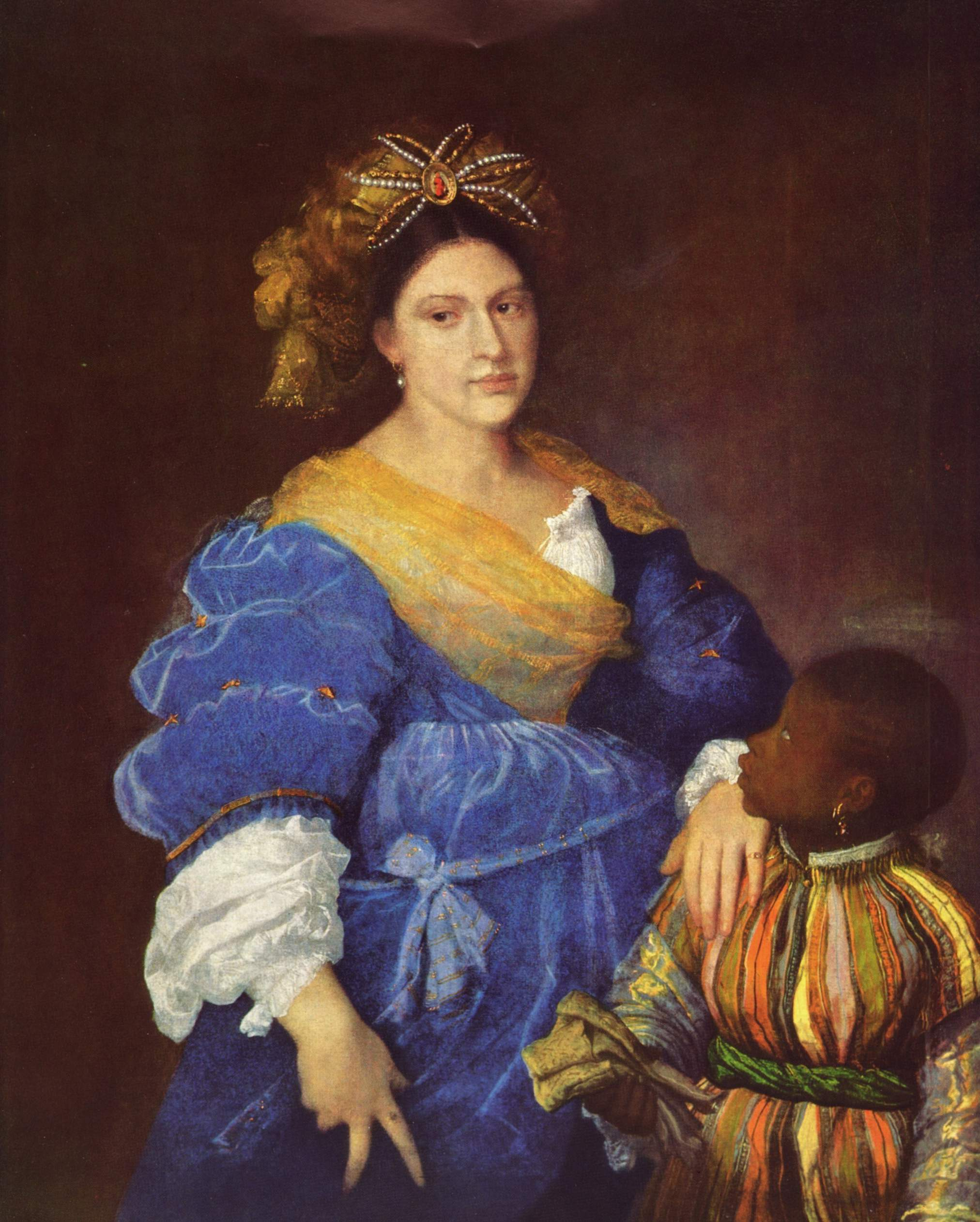
Titian: Portrait of Laura Dianti, 1523

Laura Dianti (Early sixteenth century in Ferrara – 25 June 1573 in Ferrara, Italy) was an Italian woman. She was a lover and possible third wife of Alfonso I d'Este, Duke of Ferrara.

== Biography ==
Laura Dianti was born the daughter of Francesco Boccacci Dianti (d. 1542). She became a mistress of Alfonso I d'Este, Duke of Ferrara (1476-1534) after the death of his second wife, Lucrezia Borgia, daughter of Pope Alexander VI. Laura was most probably his third wife. She was also known under the pseudonym Eustochia.

== Issue ==
The couple had two sons:

- Alfonso d'Este, Marquis of Montecchio (1527-1587), married firstly Giulia della Rovere and had issue (Dukes of Modena); married secondly in 1584 Violante Signa (1546-1609) and had issue.
- Alfonsino d'Este, Marchese di Castelnuovo (1530-1547)

== Source ==
- Bartlett, Kenneth R. (2013). A Short History of the Italian Renaissance. University of Toronto Press.
