= Alfonso d'Este, Marquis of Montecchio =

Alfonso d'Este
- Born: 10 March 1527; Ferrara
- Died: 1 November 1587 (aged 60); Ferrara
- Noble family: House of Este
- Spouses: Giulia della Rovere; Violante Signa
- Issue Detail: Alfonsino d'Este; Cesare d'Este; Eleonora d'Este (1561–1637)
- Father: Alfonso I d'Este, Duke of Ferrara
- Mother: Laura Dianti

Alfonso d'Este, Marquis of Montecchio (10 March 1527 – 1 November 1587) was an Italian nobleman from the House of Este.

== Biography ==
Born at Ferrara, Alfonso was the illegitimate son of Alfonso I d'Este, Duke of Ferrara by his lover Laura Dianti, who later got legitimized by their parents marriage. In 1523 his father gave him Montecchio Emilia and turned it into a feudal inheritance for cadet members of his family – in 1569 it was promoted to a marquessate by Maximilian II, Holy Roman Emperor.

Alfonso was legitimated in 1532 by cardinal Innocenzo Cybo. His first marriage followed on 3 January 1549, to Giulia della Rovere, daughter of Francesco Maria I della Rovere, Duke of Urbino and Eleonora Gonzaga. In 1584 he married Violante Signa (1546–1609), with whom he had one daughter and a son. He died at Ferrara in 1587.

== Issue ==
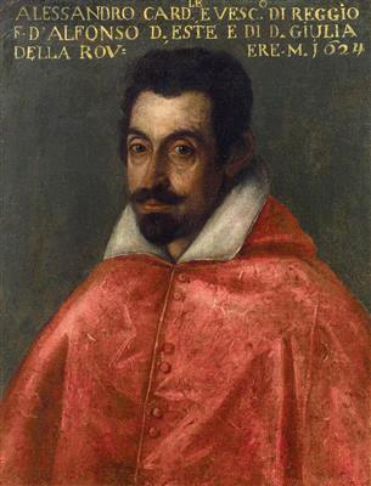
Cardinal Alessandro d’Este

Alfonso had by Giulia della Rovere (1527-1563) the following children:

- Alfonso d'Este (1560–1578), married Marfisa d'Este
- Cesare d'Este (1562–1628), married Virginia de' Medici. The legitimacy of the succession was recognized by the Emperor Rudolph II but not by Pope Clement VIII: thus, as Ferrara was nominally a Papal fief, the city was returned to the Papal States, despite the attempts of the young duke, who sought help from the Major Powers to no avail. The Este family thus lost the duchy of Ferrara.
- Eleonora d'Este (1561–1637), married Carlo Gesualdo di Venosa.

He also had by Violante Signa (1546-1609) the following children:

- Ippolita d'Este (1565–1602), married Federico Pico, Duke of Mirandola.
- Alessandro d'Este (1568–1624), made Cardinal in 1599 by Pope Clement VIII

== Sources ==
- Attwood, Philip (2003). Italian medals c.1530-1600 in British public collections. Vol. 1. British Museum Press. ISBN 9780714108612.
- Bentini, Jadranka, ed. (1998). Sovrane passioni le raccolte d'arte della Ducale galleria estense (in Italian). Federico Motta Editore. ISBN 978-88-7179-181-4.
- Rundle, David, ed. (1999). "Este dynasty". The Hutchinson Encyclopedia Of The Renaissance. Helicon Publishing. ISBN 9780813336701.
- Piperno, Franco (2024). "Negotiating Identity and Status: Musicalia in the Relational Strategies of Duke Guidubaldo II della Rovere". In Hatzikiriakos, Alexandros Maria; Borghetti, Vincenzo (eds.). The Media of Secular Music in the Medieval and Early Modern Period (1100–1650). Taylor & Francis. ISBN 9781040021064.
- Varese, Ranieri, ed. (2009). Immagine dell'invisibile spiritualità e iconografia devozionale nella chiesa di Ferrara-Comacchio (in Italian). Diabasis. ISBN 9788881035434.
- Verstegen, Ian, ed. (2007). Patronage and Dynasty: The Rise of the Della Rovere in Renaissance Italy. Truman State University Press. ISBN 978-1-931112-60-4.
