= Marfisa d'Este =

Ferrarese noblewoman

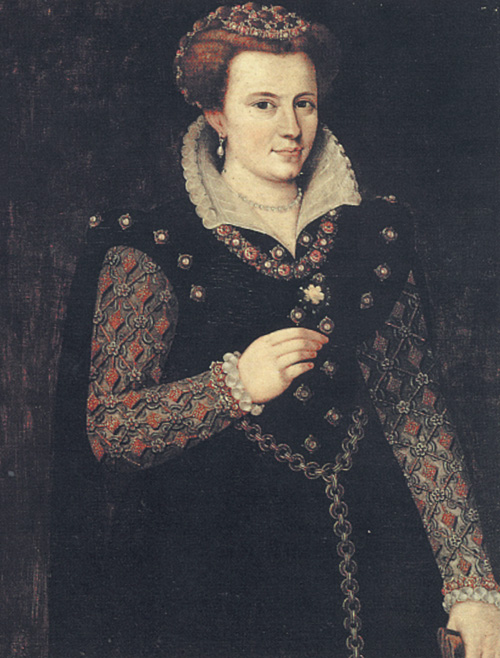
- Born: c. 1554; Ferrara, Duchy of Ferrara
- Died: 16 October 1608; Ferrara, Papal States
- Noble family: Este
- Spouses: Alfonsino di Montecchio; Alderano Cybo-Malaspina
- Issue: Carlo I Cybo-Malaspina; Francesco; Odoardo; Cesare; Vittoria; Ferdinando; Alessandro; Alfonso
- Father: Francesco d'Este
- Mother: Maria Folch de Cardona

Marfisa d'Este (c.1554 in Ferrara – 16 October 1608 in Ferrara) was a Ferrarese noblewoman. She was the illegitimate daughter of Francesco d'Este and Maria Folch de Cardona. She and her sister Bradamante (born 1559) were legitimised by both pope Gregory XIII and Alfonso II d'Este. She was also notable as a patron of the arts and the protector of Torquato Tasso.

On 5 May 1578 she married her cousin Alfonsino di Montecchio, son of Alfonso di Montecchio, who died just under four months after the wedding. She was also left a palace that year by her father, who began building it in 1559; it was called after her Palazzina Marfisa d'Este and was slowly abandoned after her death. She also inherited the San Silvestro building and Palazzo Schifanoia from him.

On 30 January 1580, she married Alderano Cybo-Malaspina, heir apparent of the Principality of Massa and Carrara. After the Duchy of Ferrara's devolution to the Papal States in 1598, due to the absence of legitimate male heirs of the House of Este, Marfisa refused to join her family in Modena, and remained in Ferrara with her husband in the palace she inherited from her father.

== Issue ==
Alderano and Marfisa had eight children:

- Carlo (1581-1662), his father's heir. Married Brigida Spinola, with issue;
- Francesco (1584-1616);
- Odoardo (1585-1612), colonel in the Spanish army;
- Cesare (1587-1588), died in infancy;
- Vittoria (1588-1635), married Ercole Pepoli, count of Castiglione;
- Ferdinando (1590-1623), canon of San Lorenzo in Genoa;
- Alessandro (1594-1639), knight of the Order of Malta;
- Alfonso (1596).
