= Portrait of Eleonora Gonzaga della Rovere =

1538 painting by Titian

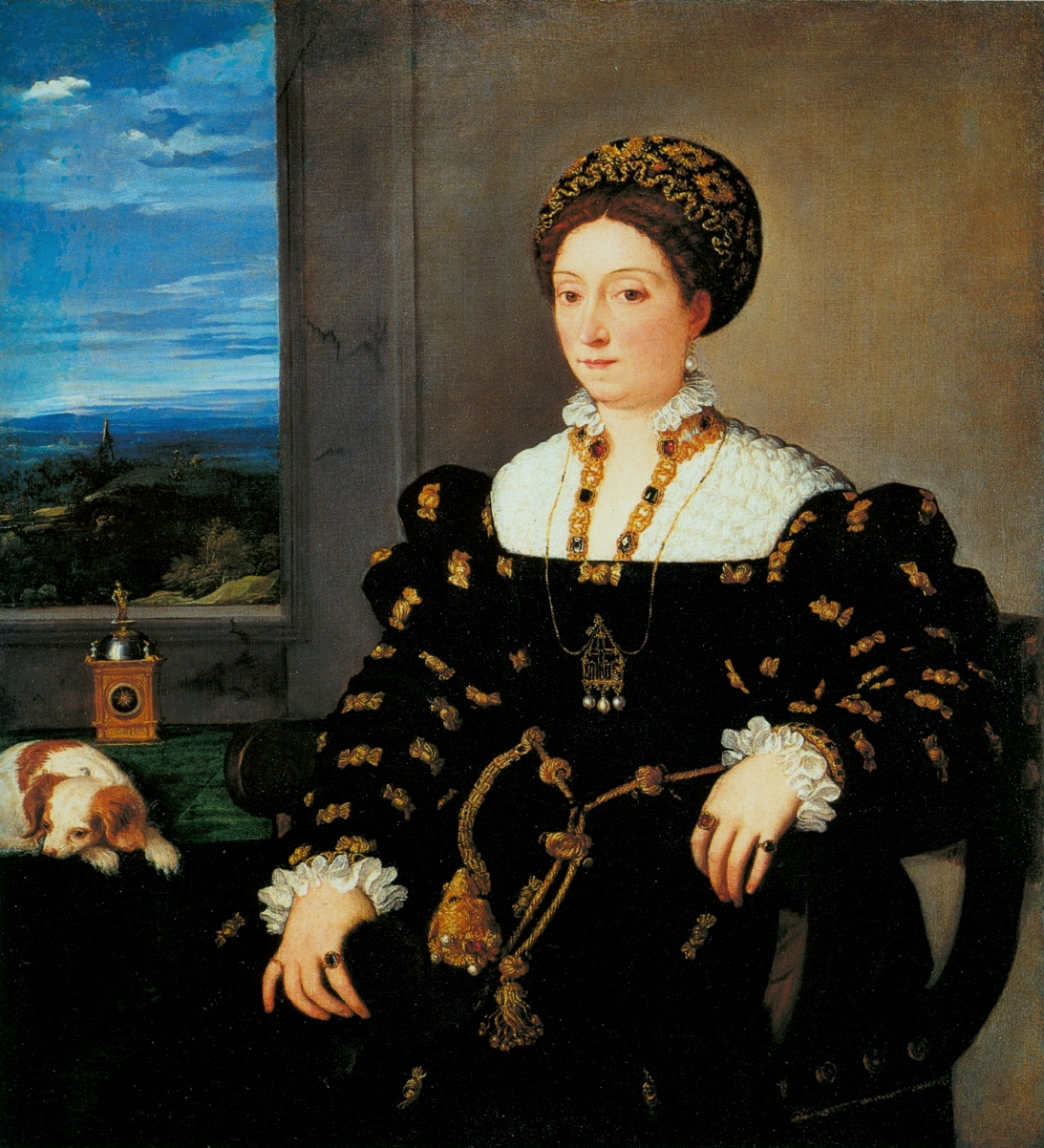
- Artist: Titian
- Year: 1538
- Medium: oil on canvas
- Dimensions: 114 cm × 102,2 cm (45 in × 402 in)
- Location: Uffizi, Florence

Portrait of Eleonora Gonzaga della Rovere is a 1538 painting by Titian, now in the Uffizi in Florence alongside its pair, Portrait of Francesco Maria della Rovere, showing Eleonora's husband. It formed the prototype for some of his later portraits, such as that of Isabella of Portugal.

== Description ==
Eleonora Gonzaga della Rovere is portrayed seated in a three-quarter length depiction, towards the left. She is richly dressed, according to her nobility condition. She wears a headdress with gold embroidery that recalls a fashion launched by Isabella d'Este, very popular among the Northern Italian noblewomen of the time.

The dress is in sumptuous dark velvet, with gold bows and a neckline covered in white silk and edged with gold inlays with precious stones. The colors recall those of the saddle of the Montefeltro family, from whom the della Rovere family had inherited the duchy. Puffs of silk come out of the sleeves, elegantly wavy. The belt is a gold cord with a tassel at the end, from which hangs a marten with a jewel-like head, in gold with pearls and rubies set in it; the Duchess caresses its dark fur with her right hand. The lady also wears other jewelry, including a chain around her neck with a pendant with drop-shaped pearls (a symbol of the bride's purity), pearl earrings, and rings.

The background of the portrait is a gray wall, where a window opens, showing a distant green landscape. Near the Duchess, under the window, there is a small table covered with a green cloth, on which are a sleeping spotted dog and a golden clock crowned by a statuette. These are symbolic elements, also present in other paintings by Titian. The dog, for example, is almost identical to the one in the Venus of Urbino and symbolizes fidelity. The clock appears in several portraits, like Gentleman with a Watch, at the Museo del Prado. It symbolizes eternity, perhaps in the sense of eternal fidelity in marriage, or temperance (for the regularity of the ticking) or it could even represent a memento mori, for the passage of time. It could also simply be a status symbol: after all, since the Dukes of Urbino collected such artefacts and Titian himself once acted as an intermediary in the purchase of a watch made by a master watchmaker from Augsburg.
