= Francesco Maria I della Rovere =

Italian condottiero (1490–1538)

Francesco Maria I
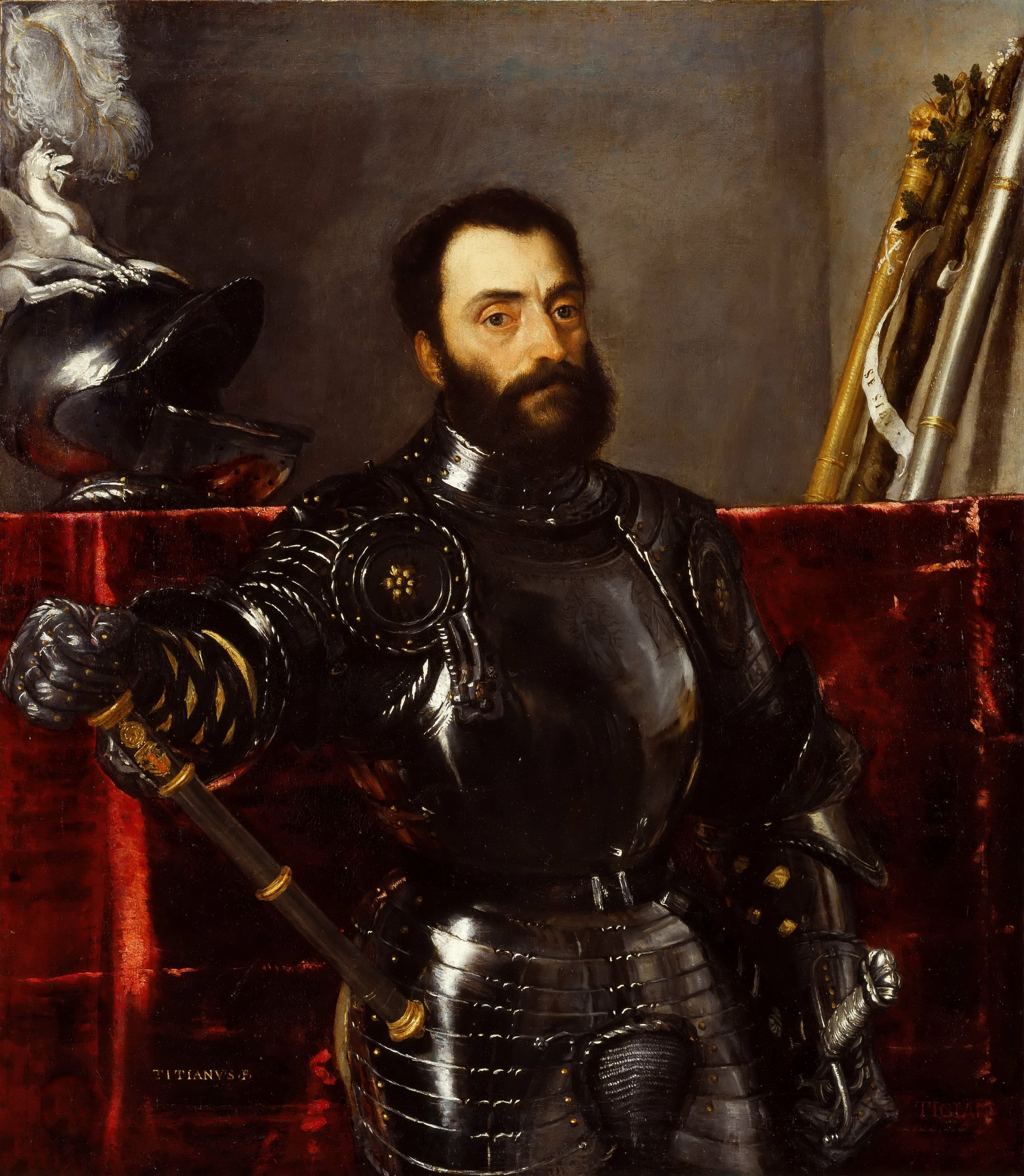
- Portrait of Francesco Maria della Rovere by Titian, c. 1536–38

Duke of Urbino
- Reign: 11 April 1508 – 1516
- Predecessor: Guidobaldo I
- Successor: Lorenzo II de' Medici
- Reign: December 1521 – 20 October 1538
- Predecessor: Lorenzo II de' Medici
- Successor: Guidobaldo II
- Born: 22 March 1490; Senigallia, Duchy of Urbino
- Died: 20 October 1538 (aged 48); Urbino, Duchy of Urbino
- Spouse: Eleonora Gonzaga
- Issue: Federico della Rovere; Guidobaldo II della Rovere; Ippolita della Rovere; Giovanna della Rovere; Giovanni della Rovere; Caterina della Rovere; Beatrice della Rovere; Francesco della Rovere; Maria della Rovere; Elisabetta della Rovere; Giulia della Rovere; Giulio della Rovere; Violante della Rovere
- House: Rovere
- Father: Giovanni della Rovere
- Mother: Giovanna da Montefeltro

Francesco Maria I della Rovere (25 March 1490 – 20 October 1538) was an Italian condottiero, who was Duke of Urbino from 1508 to 1516 and, after retaking the throne from Lorenzo II de' Medici, from 1521 to 1538.

== Biography ==
Francesco was born in Senigallia, the son of the Papal captain and lord of that city, Giovanni della Rovere, and Giovanna da Montefeltro, daughter of Federico III da Montefeltro. He was also the nephew of Giuliano della Rovere, Pope Julius II.

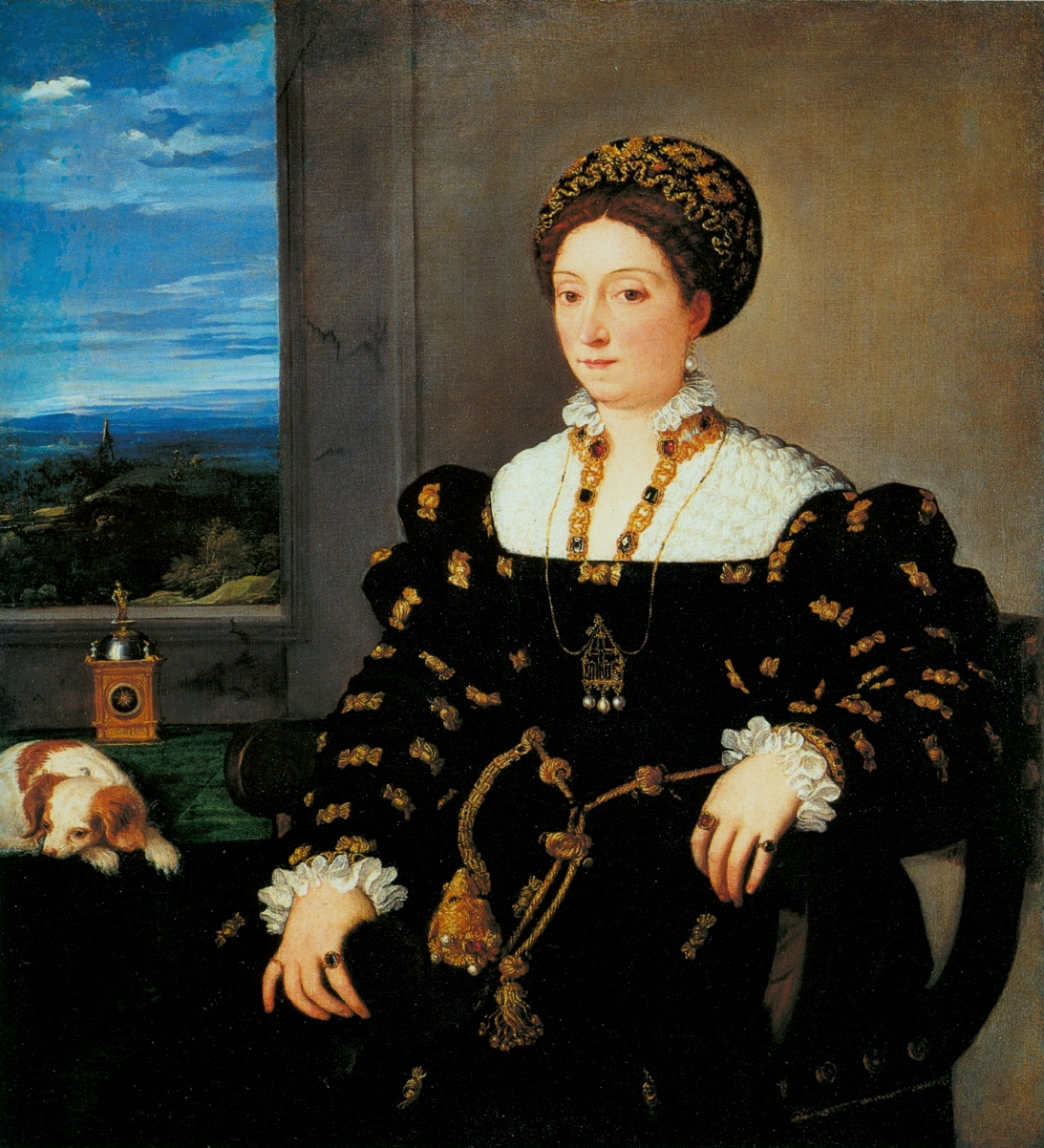
Portrait of Eleonora Gonzaga by Titian, 1538

His uncle Guidobaldo I of Urbino, who was without an heir, summoned him to his court and made him heir of that dukedom in 1504, through the intercession of Julius II. In 1502 the della Rovere had lost the seigniory of Senigallia, occupied by Cesare Borgia, then the most powerful figure in the Marche: Francesco Maria and his mother were saved from the slaughter perpetrated by Borgia's troops by the then-land soldier Andrea Doria. When in 1508 Guidobaldo died, Francesco Maria became duke of Urbino; thanks to the support of his uncle the pope he could also recover Senigallia after Borgia's death.

In 1508 he married Eleonora Gonzaga (1493–1570), daughter of Francesco II Gonzaga, Marquess of Mantua and Isabella d'Este.

In 1509 he was appointed as capitano generale (commander-in-chief) of the Papal States, and subsequently fought in the Italian Wars against Ferrara and Venice. In 1511, after he had failed to conquer Bologna, Francesco personally murdered the cardinal Francesco Alidosi, with whom he had a longstanding feud with. He then fled to Urbino. In 1513 he was created also lord of Pesaro.

However, the death of Julius II deprived him of his main political patron, and under the new pope, Leo X, Pesaro was given to the latter's nephew, Lorenzo II de' Medici. In 1516 he was excommunicated and ousted from Urbino, which he tried unsuccessfully to recover the following year. He could return in his duchy only after Leo's death in 1521.

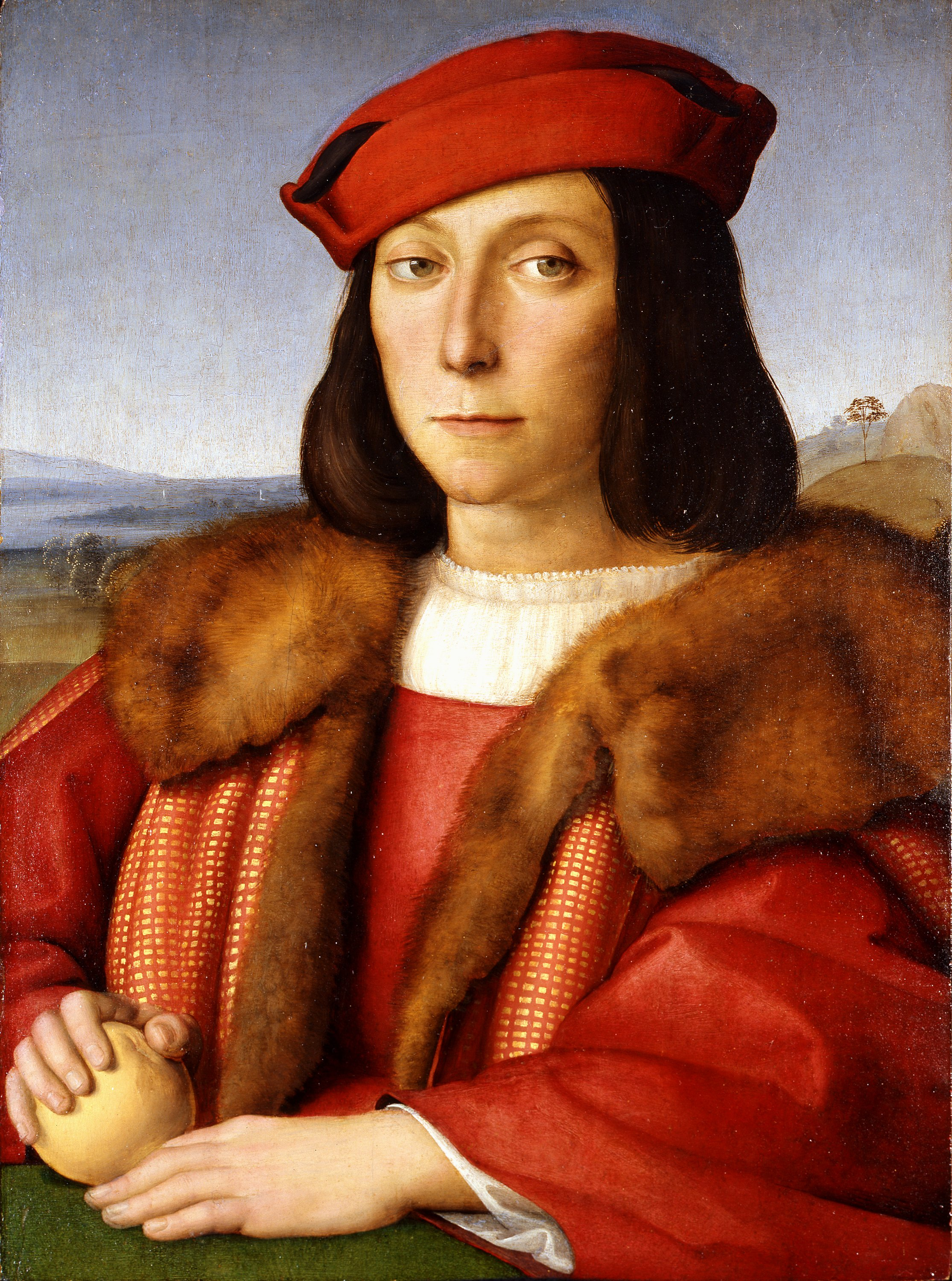
Young Man with an Apple, portrait of Francesco Maria as a teenager by Raphael, 1504.

Della Rovere fought as captain general of the Republic of Venice in Lombardy during the Italian Wars of 1521 (1523–1525), but with the new Medici Pope, Clement VII, the della Rovere were increasingly marginalized. As supreme commander of the Holy League, his inaction against the Imperial invasion troops is generally listed as one of the causes of the Sack of Rome (1527).

He was a protagonist of the capture of Pavia in the late 1520s, and later fought for the Republic of Venice. Later he arranged the marriage of son Guidobaldo to Giulia da Varano (belonging to another former seigniory family of the region) to counter the Papal power in the Marche. The marriage was arranged in 1527 through an agreement between Francesco Maria I della Rovere and Caterina Cybo, the regent of Camerino and mother of Giulia da Varano.

He died in Pesaro, with rumors that he was poisoned by Luigi Gonzaga. Some scholars suggest that The Murder of Gonzago, an unknown play referenced in William Shakespeare's Hamlet, Prince of Denmark, which is itself later reworked by Hamlet into The Mousetrap (the play within the play), may have been a popular theatrical reenactment of Della Rovere's death and may have been portrayed in England's early theaters during the Elizabethan Era.

== Issue ==
Francesco and Eleanora had:

- Federico della Rovere (1511 – died aged two months).
- Guidobaldo II della Rovere (2 April 1514 – 28 September 1574), married Giulia Varano and had issue; married Vittoria Farnese (daughter of Pier Luigi Farnese, Duke of Parma) had issue (ancestors of Maria Teresa Cybo-Malaspina).
- Ippolita della Rovere (1515–1561), married Antonio of Aragon, Duke of Montalto.
- Giovanna della Rovere (1515–1518).
- Giovanni della Rovere (1516–1518).
- Caterina della Rovere (1518–1520).
- Beatrice della Rovere (1521–1522).
- Francesco Maria della Rovere (1523–1525).
- Maria della Rovere (1527–1528).
- Elisabetta della Rovere (1529 – 6 June 1561), married Alberico I Cybo-Malaspina, Marquis of Massa and had issue (ancestors of Maria Teresa Cybo-Malaspina).
- Giulia Feltria della Rovere (1531 – 4 April 1563), married Alfonso d'Este, Lord of Montecchio and had issue (were parents of Cesare d'Este, Duke of Modena).
- Giulio Feltrio della Rovere (1533–1578), became a cardinal then later had issue (illegitimate):Ippolito and Giulio.
- Violante della Rovere (1535–1538).

== Sources ==
- Albury, W.R. (2016). Castiglione's Allegory: Veiled Policy in The Book of the Courtier (1528). Routledge.
- Bartlett, Kenneth R. (2013). A Short History of the Italian Renaissance. University of Toronto Press.
- Cole, Bruce (2018). Titian And Venetian Painting, 1450-1590. Routledge.
- Fletcher, Catherine (2020). The Beauty and the Terror: The Italian Renaissance and the Rise of the West. Oxford University Press.
- Rendina, Claudio (1994). I capitani di ventura. Rome: Newton Compton.

Italian nobility
Preceded by Giovanni della Rovere	Duke of Sora; 1501–1516	Succeeded by William de Croÿ
Preceded by Guidobaldo I	Duke of Urbino; 1508–1516 (1517)	Succeeded by Lorenzo II de' Medici
Preceded by Lorenzo II de' Medici	Duke of Urbino; 1521–1538	Succeeded by Guidobaldo II
Preceded by William de Croÿ	Duke of Sora; 1533–1538	Succeeded by Giulio della Rovere
