= Portrait of Francesco Maria della Rovere (Titian) =

Painting by Titian

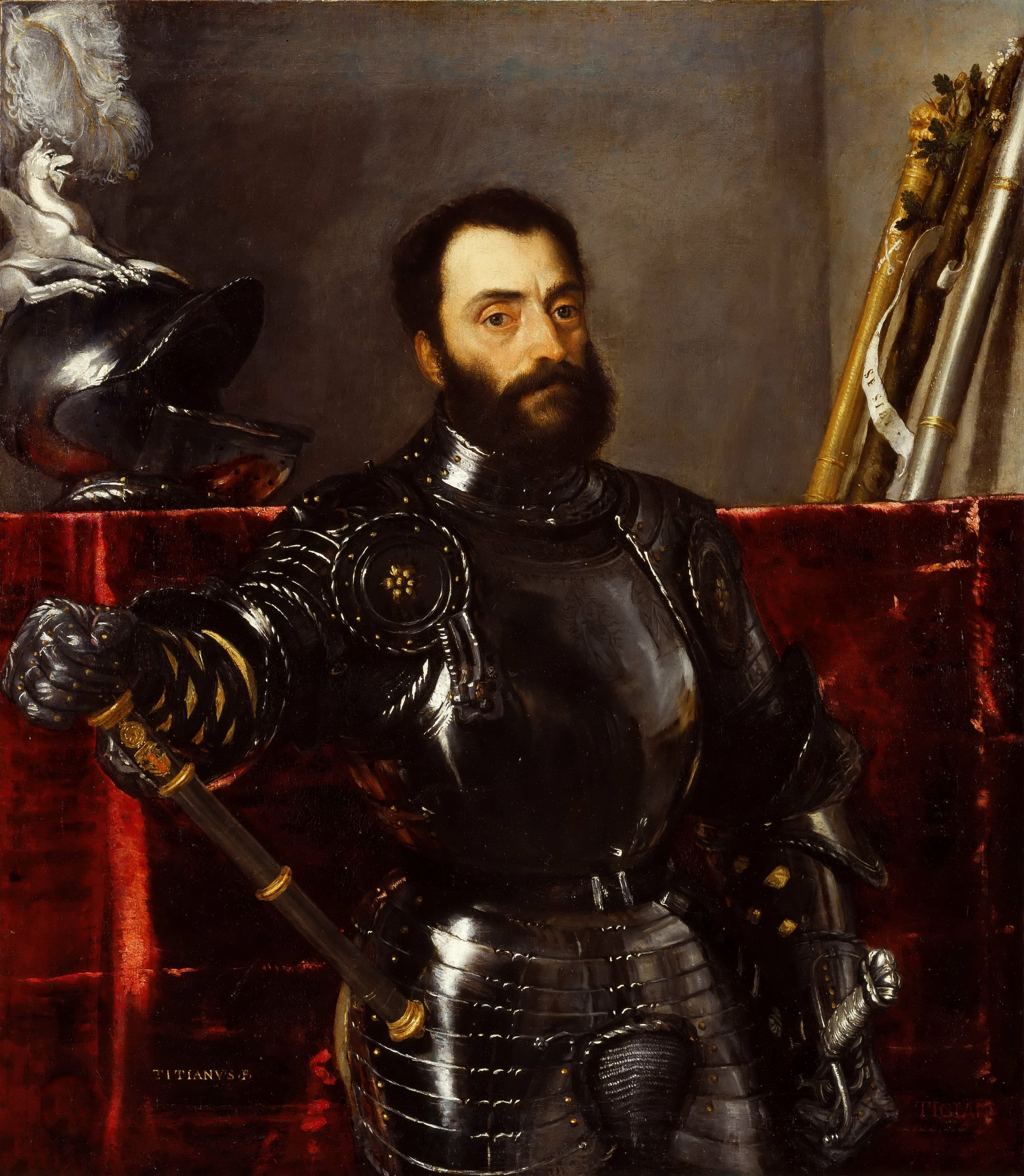
- Artist: Titian
- Year: 1536-1538
- Medium: oil on canvas
- Dimensions: 114 cm × 103 cm (45 in × 41 in)
- Location: Uffizi, Florence

Portrait of Francesco Maria della Rovere is an oil on canvas painting by Titian, from 1536-1538. It depicts Francesco Maria I della Rovere, Duke of Urbino. It is held now in the Uffizi, in Florence. Signed TITIANVS F.[ECIT], it forms a pair with the same artist's Portrait of Eleonora Gonzaga della Rovere, Francesco's wife, also in the Uffizi.

== Description ==
The pose chosen is meant to recall the portrait of Charles V, executed by Titian in the Ducal Palace of Mantua, within the series of the Twelve Caesars and now lost, only known from engravings. The duke is shown at nearly three-quarter length, he wears armor and, slightly rotating his torso, rests the commander's baton on his side (symbol of the generalship bestowed by the Venetian Republic), while stretching out his right arm near the hilt of his sword.

His gaze is fixed towards the viewer, highlighted by the compositional cut that places him against the dark background of the wall, while the rest of his body has a red velvet drape behind it that covers a shelf. Resting on it are his helmet, with a sumptuous figurative crest (a dragon, an allusion to his ties with the House of Aragon) and plumage, and other marshal's batons: one has the insignia of the Papal State, the other that of the Florentine Republic. Among these is an oak branch with buds, an object of the evident heraldic and dynastic meaning: the cut branch throws new leaves, alluding to the obtaining of the fief of Urbino after the extinction of the House of Montefeltro. In addition, there is a small scroll with one of the duke's mottos, "SE SIBI", which would allude to his will to fight for himself and for his family: therefore the four sticks represent his entire brilliant military career, at the head of the militias of Venice, Florence, the pope and his own, or the Duchy of Pesaro/Urbino.

Despite the ceremonial pose, the portrait of the duke is striking for its human intensity, according to a style pursued by Titian in those years, that also appears in the portraits of the pope and the emperor. The duke's skin shows the signs of the passage of time, but instead of making the protagonist unattractive, they seem to accentuate some of his qualities, such as his value, nobility of spirit, and courage. Framed by the beard and dark hair, his face shines with a beam of light that carefully peers its details.

Titian uses several brushstrokes for different effects, making it, for example, rapid for the feathers of the crest, rough and creamy for the red satin, dense and creamy for the complexion, smooth and brightened with touches of white to give the shining effect of the armor.
