= Alderano Cybo-Malaspina (1552–1606) =

Italian nobleman

- Born: 9 December 1552; Massa
- Died: 16 November 1606 (aged 53); Ferrara
- Occupation: Nobleman
- Spouse: Marfisa d'Este
- Children: 7

Alderano Cybo-Malaspina (9 December 1552 in Massa – 16 November 1606 in Ferrara) was an Italian nobleman. He was marquess of Carrara, count of Ferentillo, first Duke of Ferentillo from 1603, Roman Patrician and Genoese Patrician, Patrician of Pisa and Florence, Patrician of Naples and Noble of Viterbo.

== Early life and ancestry ==
He was the only son of Alberico I, member of the House of Cybo-Malaspina, sovereign prince of Massa and Carrara, by his first wife, Elisabetta della Rovere (d. 1561), but, despite being Alberico's heir, he never ascended the throne, having predeceased his father.

== Marriage and issue ==
His advisors decided he should marry into the House of Este and so in 1580 he married Marfisa d'Este in Ferrara. She was the illegitimate but legitimised daughter of Francesco d'Este. They had seven children:

- Carlo I (18 November 1581 in Ferrara – 13 February 1662 in Massa), Sovereign Prince of Massa and Sovereign Marquess of Carrara from 1623 to 1662
- Francesco (1584 in Ferrara – 1616 in Massa), Roman Patrician and Genoese Patrician, Patrician of Pisa and Florence, Patrician of Naples, Noble of Viterbo
- Odoardo (1585 in Ferrara – 1612 in Genoa), Roman Patrician and Genoese Patrician, Patrician of Pisa and Florence, Patrician of Naples, Noble of Viterbo, colonel of the armies of His Most Catholic Majesty
- Cesare (born and died 1587 in Ferrara);
- Vittoria (1588 in Ferrara – 1635 in Bologna); married in 1603 in Ferrara to Ercole Pepoli, Count of Castiglione, Count of the Holy Roman Empire, Patrician of Bologna and Senator of Bologna;
- Ferdinando (1590 in Ferrara – 1623 in Massa), priest, canon of Genoa Cathedral;
- Alessandro (1594 in Ferrara – 1639 in Rome), took vows as a Knight of Malta in 1597
- Alfonso (born and died 1596 in Ferrara), Roman Patrician and Genoese Patrician, Patrician of Pisa and Florence, Patrician of Naples, Noble of Viterbo
