= Palazzina Marfisa d'Este =

Coordinates: 44°49′59″N 11°37′47″E

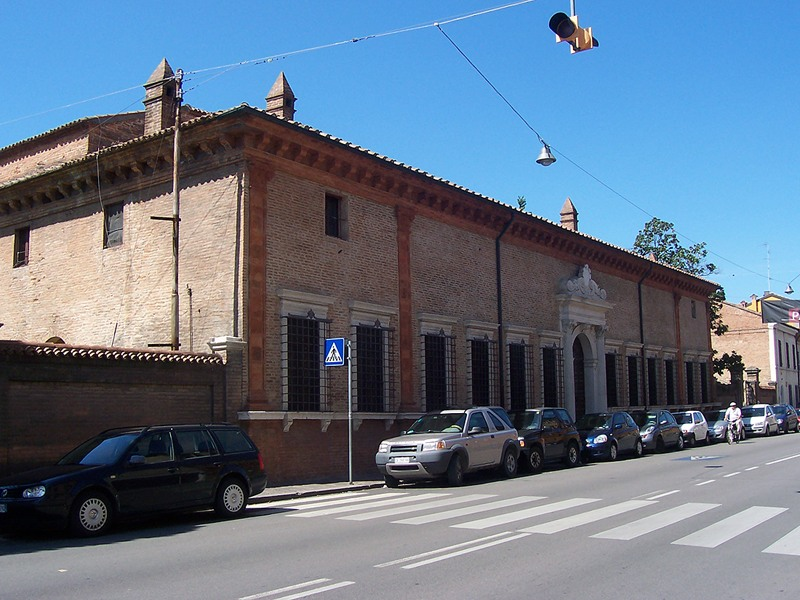
Palazzina Marfisa d'Este

The Palazzina Marfisa d'Este is a Renaissance-style small palace, once suburban, and sometimes referred to as a villa, located on Corso Giovecca #170, just east of Central Ferrara, region of Emilia-Romagna, Italy. It was constructed in 1559 by the peripatetic Francesco d'Este, and inherited by his daughter, Marfisa in 1578.

== History ==
The palace is best known for its former owner. Marfisa was one of two illegitimate daughters of the mercurial Francesco d'Este, Marquis of Massalombarda. Francesco was the second son to Alfonso d'Este, Duke of Ferrara, and Lucrezia Borgia. Marfisa, born circa 1554, was named after one of the characters of the epic Orlando Furioso; she was legitimized by Pope Gregory XIII in 1573. Her first, short-lived marriage was to Alfonsino d’Este, but her next marriage, to Alderano Cybo-Malaspina, lasted for over two decades.

Upon the death of both her father and uncle, Ercole II d'Este, who both died without producing male heirs, she was unable, by law, to take on the lordship of any of the Este properties. However, she escaped exile and remained as nearly the only Este descendant able to reside in Ferrara, and lived in this villa until her death in 1608.

After Marfisa's death, the palazzina passed on to the Cybo-Malaspina family until 1861, when it became the property of the city. The palace fell into disrepair and the movable artwork and furniture was sold.

In 1910, restoration began to make it a museum, which opened in 1938.

== Art and Architecture ==
The palace now presents a low, long brick facade on a busy street, and is not highly distinctive except for its prominent portal.

The interior rooms have ceilings frescoed with grottesche and mythologic scenes. The furniture, while befitting the epoch, is not original. The palazzina houses a 15th-century marble bust of Duke Ercole I d'Este. In the logetta are portraits putatively of Marfisa and her sister Bradamante, as young girls. La Palazzina has a number of rooms: Sala delle Imprese, Sala di Fetonte (Phaeton), Sala dei Banchetti, Sala Grande, Sala del Camino, Loggetta dei Ritratti and a Studiolo.

== Gardens ==
Originally, the gardens extended further, abutting the Palazzo Bonacossi. By 1938, much of the garden was occupied by the Tennis Club Marfisa. The remaining gardens and grounds were re-arranged. At the center was a bronze cherub fountain by sculptor Giuseppe Virgili.

Across from the garden and fountain is a loggia. Its frescoed ceiling depicts a vine arbor with grapes, from which peer animals such as birds, squirrels, and monkeys. It was restored in 1938 by the painter Augusto Pagliarini.

It is said that in this loggia was first represented l'Aminta by Torquato Tasso, a friend of Marfisa.

== Legends ==
Supernatural and salaciously macabre stories regarding Marfisa are circulated; they were, perhaps, concocted to titillate the visitors who were not satisfied with mere Renaissance decoration. There are fantastical stories that Marfisa enjoyed post-mortem rides through the city at midnight in a wolf-drawn carriage. Other stories implied that Marfisa would lure young men to this palace and then kill them. The reality was probably far more mundane, since Marfisa died but a few years after her husband of more than two decades.
