= Bartolomeo Campi =

Italian renaissance artist, goldsmith, armourer and military engineer

Bartolomeo Campi (died 1573), was an Italian renaissance artist, goldsmith, armourer, and military engineer from Pesaro, who worked at the courts of Urbino and France.

He is sometime confused with the Italian artist Bartolomeo Cesi (1556–1629).

== Career ==
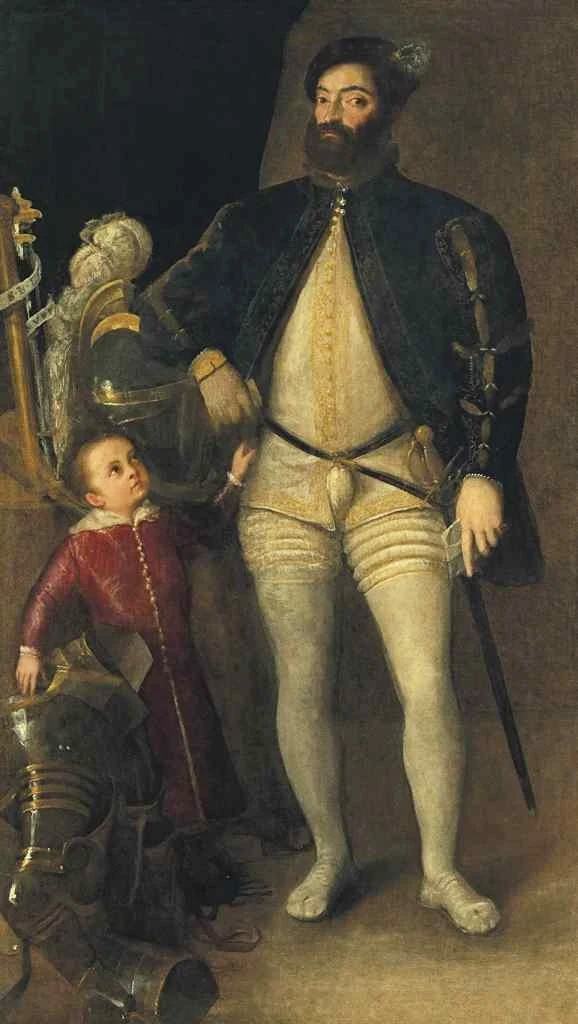
Campi's first patron, the Duke of Urbino and his son Francesco Maria, Titian

He was born in Pesaro, the son of a goldsmith of Modena, Bernardino Campi. Pietro Aretino commended his early works.

Bartolomeo Campi worked for Guidobaldo II della Rovere, Duke of Urbino. In 1546, he made the Duke a suit of armour in all'antica, ancient Roman style, now held by the Royal Collection in Madrid. He signed the cuirass "BARTOLOMEUS CAMPI", recording it as a year's worth of work made by continuous labour in two months. A pair of stirrups in the Victoria and Albert Museum including similar decoration of damascened vine leaf tendrils are thought to have been made by his workshop, although these are signed "ACF" rather than "BC Fecit".

Bartolomeo Campi designed costume for court festivals in Urbino and for Guidobaldo della Rovere's marriage to Vittoria Farnese in January 1548. According to Guidobaldo del Monte, Bartolomeo also designed an automaton for the Duke's dinner table, a silver tortoise with a shell that opened to deliver toothpicks to the guests.

=== An innovative cannon ===
In April 1554, the Duke of Urbino recommended Bartolomeo's skills to Ercole II d'Este, Duke of Ferrara and King Henry II of France for his innovations in artillery. After a short period in Siena, where he was wounded, and Venice, Bartolomeo worked at the French court from 1557 to 1562.

In January 1555, Bartolomeo, or his brother Giacomo di Bernardino Campi, demonstrated a novel cannon in Paris for Henry II that could be easily dismantled in sections for transport. Campi's gun was described by the English diplomat, Nicholas Wotton. Sent from the "duke of Urbin", it had a longer range and greater power than a conventional brass cannon of the same size. An Italian military engineer working in England in 1561, Giovanni Portinari, claimed to have the design of Bartholmew Campi's "portative cannon".

According to Julio Alvarotto, an envoy of Duke of Ferrara, an Italian artist "Bartho da Pesaro" who had worked for the Duke of Urbino designed pageant ships with sails of silver cloth to carry masque dancers in the hall of the Palais de la Cité following the wedding of Mary, Queen of Scots, and Francis, Dauphin of France on 24 April 1558. Alvarotto wrote that Charles III, Duke of Lorraine had paid six thousand ducats for the pageant of ships.

In the same year, Bartolomeo served François, Duke of Guise at Calais and the siege of Guînes. In 1558 Bartolomeo served the Duke of Guise at Calais and the siege of Guînes.

He made a will in Paris in December 1567. Fernando Álvarez de Toledo, 3rd Duke of Alba employed Bartolomeo Campi and his son Scipio from 1568. His proposals for improvements to the fortifications at Antwerp, designed by Francesco Paciotto, were not carried out. Bartolomeo Campi was killed by an arquebus shot on 3 March 1573 at the siege of Haarlem.
