= Sandown Castle =

Sandown Castle may refer to the following forts in England:

- Sandown Castle, Kent
- Sandown Castle, Isle of Wight
