= Isabella Feltria della Rovere =

Italian noblewoman (1552–1619)

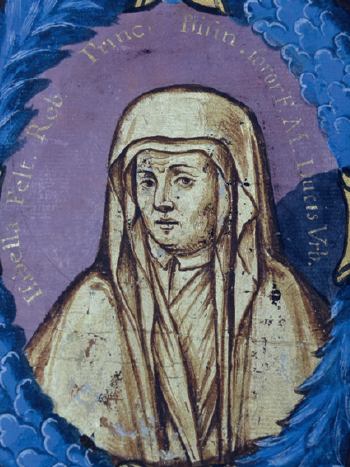
- Born: 1 August 1552
- Died: 6 July 1619 (aged 66)
- Spouse: Niccolò Bernardino Sanseverino (m. 1565; died 1606)
- Issue: Francesco Teodoro Sanseverino
- House: della Rovere
- Father: Guidobaldo II della Rovere
- Mother: Vittoria Farnese

Isabella Feltria della Rovere (1 August 1552 – 6 July 1619) was an Italian princess from the House of della Rovere. Through her marriage to Niccolò Bernardino Sanseverino, she became a princess of Bisignano. She is best known for her patronage of the Jesuits and of the Gesù Nuovo church in Naples.

== Early life ==
Isabella Feltria della Rovere was born on 1 August 1552 to Guidobaldo II della Rovere, Duke of Urbino and his second wife Vittoria Farnese, Princess of Parma. On her maternal side, Isabella was the niece of Ottavio Farnese, Duke of Parma and Cardinal Alessandro Farnese, and was a great-granddaughter of Pope Paul III.

Isabella was raised in a sophisticated Renaissance courts in Pesaro and Urbino, and exposed to various academics and artists including Federico Barocci, Federico Zuccari, Torquato Tasso and Bernardo Tasso, the later of whom mentioned referred to Isabella, her sister Lavinia and her mother in his epic poem Amadigi in 1560. She was likely taught mathematics and science by Vincenzo Bartoli and Ludovico Corrado, both of whom also tutored her brother Francesco Maria. Her mother also supplemented her education by informally teaching her about diplomacy, household management, negotiation, and patronage of the arts. Isabella would later inherit a large collection of religious relics from her mother.

== Marriage and issue ==
From the age of ten, Isabella had been betrothed to Niccolò Bernardino Sanseverino, prince of Bisignano, who was ten years older than her. The two were married in 1565, at the della Rovere court in Pesaro, where the couple stayed for some time after the wedding before moving to Calabria, bringing with her ladies-in-waiting from Urbino. Through the marriage, she became a princess of Bisignano. Although Bisignano was a large kingdom, it was heavily in debt. The marriage soon proved unhappy, with her husband away on long hunting trips and Isabella homesick for the refinement of the della Rovere courts and disapproved of the intrigue and indulgent nature of the Bisignano courtiers, finding their behaviour vulgar. She attempted to curb their behaviour and habits, her husband instead supported his courtiers. To escape the Bisignano court, Isabella began travelling without her husband. In 1567, she underwent pilgrimages with her mother and sisters to Assisi and Basilica della Santa Casa. Isabella also lived for a time with her cousin Clelia Farnese in Rome.

A growth appeared on her nose when she was around twenty. Attempts by physicians to treat it instead caused it to ulcerate, resulting in her nasal cartilage eroding. It also left a large hole in the cavity between her palette and nose, which caused her to have constant spasms and pain for the rest of her life. During a period of reconciliation with her husband in the early 1580s, she became pregnant. She gave birth to her only child, Francesco Teodoro in April 1581. After his birth, she again separated from her husband and decided to return home to Urbino. However, she was forced to return to Calabria after falling ill. Isabella eventually managed to move to Naples with her son, supposedly to find a cure for her condition. She ensured that her son was raised piously by having him educated by the Jesuits. However, he died suddenly aged fourteen and was buried at the Gesù Nuovo church in Naples. Her husband died in 1606.

== Patronages ==
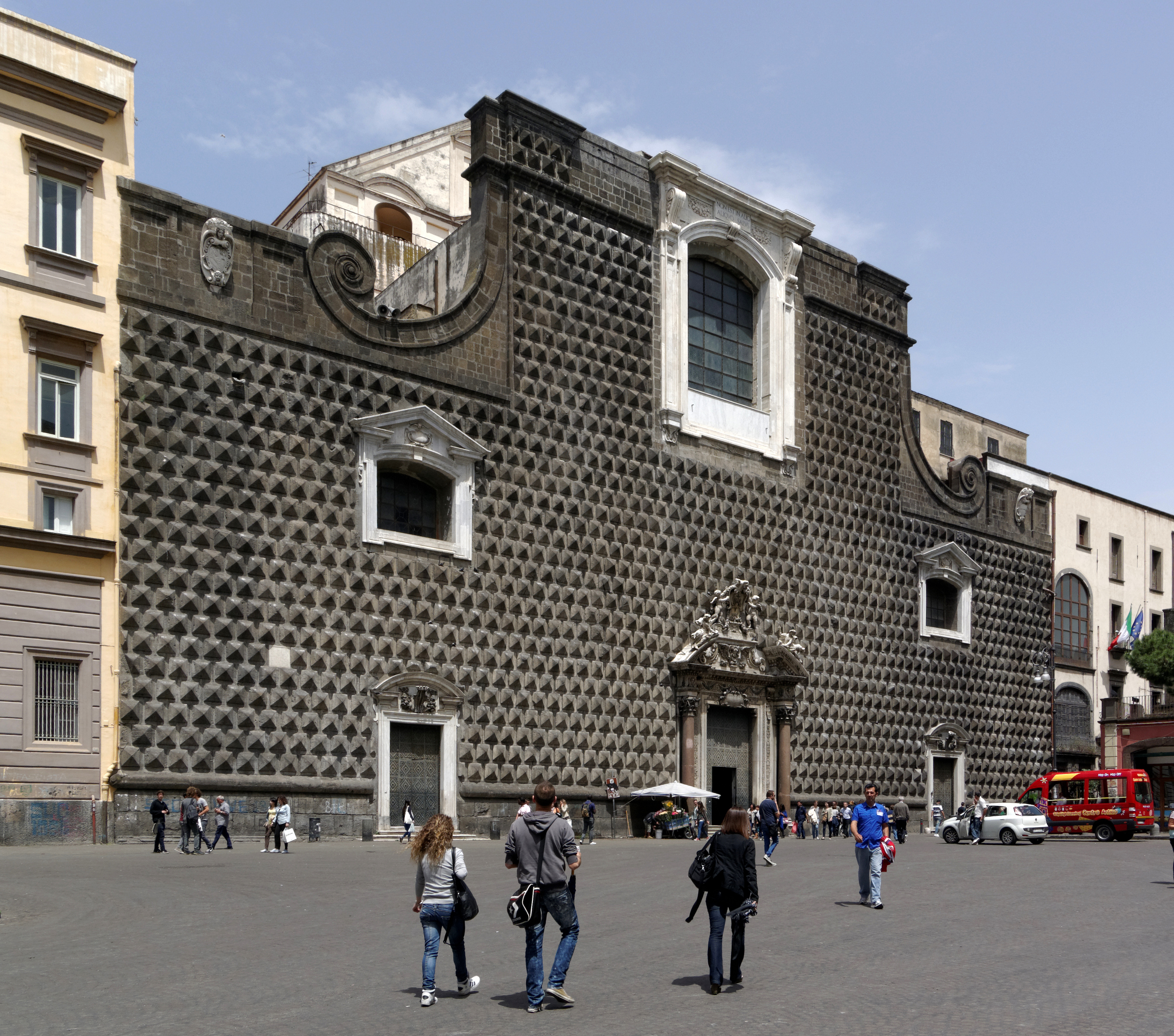
The Gesù Nuovo church in 2013

In the late 1560s, Isabella was visited by missionaries Lucio Croce and Juan Xavier from the recently founded Jesuit Order. From this visit, she became interested in their philosophy and began to support them financially. Her name first officially appears in the Jesuit records in 1577. She had offered to support the construction of the Gesù Nuovo church in 1598 in exchange for a tomb to be constructed for her late son. Due to her contributions, she was named founder of the edifice of the church, and her name was engraved in a stone of the tympanum above the main entrance. Isabella also gave relics to the Gesù Nuovo and to her Jesuit confessor Vicenzo Maggio, some of which she had inherited from her mother and uncle. In addition to her own donated relics, she also managed to acquire some for the church, including the head of S. Cornelio Papa, as well as having her cousin Odoardo Farnese look for more in the catacombs in Rome. Around the same time, she also paid 90,000 Roman scudi for the construction of the Jesuit novitiate of San Vitale, Rome, as well as paying for the Casa del Carmine church in Naples. She would contribute to financially support the Jesuits throughout the 1580s and 1590s.

In addition to her religious patronages, she collected various scientific items. Isabella also commissioned works by Federico Barocci.

== Death and legacy ==
Isabella died on 6 July 1619, at the age of 66. Despite her request of a simple funeral, the Jesuit Order arranged a grand ceremony and monument for her in Naples. Her tomb was designed by Giovanni Battista Mascolo, and decorated with gold and lapis lazuli. In her native Urbino, her brother Francesco Maria also held a funeral for her there, and had Julius Capaccio perform an elegy for her.

Her confessor Vincenzo Maggio wrote a biography of her life in 1637, although it was never published. It was separated into three sections covering her early life and marriage, her spirituality, and her charitable patronages and death.

== Sources ==
- Novi Chavarria, Elisa (2019). "Domestic Religion and Connected Spaces: Isabella della Rovere, Princess of Bisignano (1552–1619)". In Corry, Maya; Faini, Marco; Meneghin, Alessia (eds.). Domestic Devotions in Early Modern Italy. Brill. ISBN 9789004342569.
- Conelli, Maria Ann (2007). "The Ecclesiastical Patronage of Isabella Feltria della Rovere". In Verstegen, Ian F. (ed.). Patronage and Dynasty The Rise of the Della Rovere in Renaissance Italy. Penn State University Press. ISBN 9780271091105.
