= Giovanni Portinari =

Italian military engineer

Giovanni Portinari (flourished 1526 – 1572) was an Italian military engineer who served several Tudor monarchs of England. He is most famous for organising the demolition of Lewes Priory in 1538 on the orders of Thomas Cromwell, the chief minister of King Henry VIII.

== Biography ==
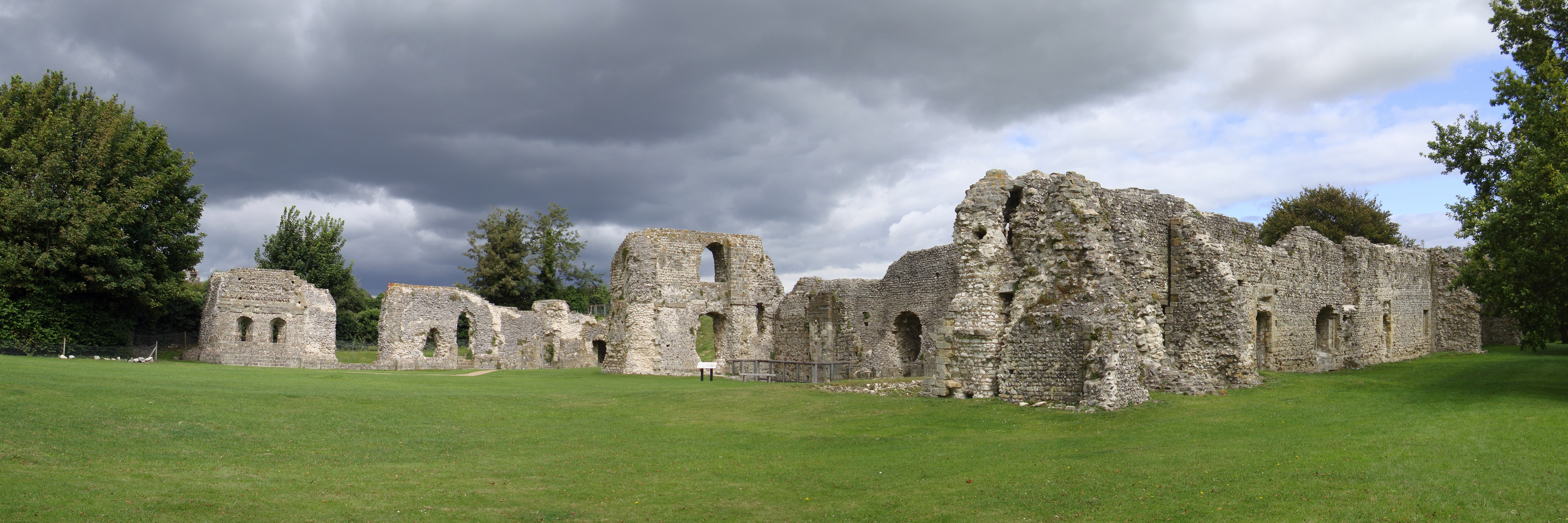
The ruins of Lewes Priory

Little is known about Portinari's early life, but he was probably born in Florence, which was home to a number of prominent individuals with this surname, such as Beatrice Portinari and Tommaso Portinari.

He was living in England by 1526, in which year he is recorded as one of the gentlemen pensioners of King Henry VIII (a position he retained until at least 1547), and in February 1537 he was formally naturalised as an English subject. Around the same time he further demonstrated his commitment to his new homeland by taking an English wife.

In the late 1530s the Dissolution of the Monasteries got under way, and Portinari was hired by Thomas Cromwell, the king's chief minister and principal architect of the anti-monastic policy, to undertake the demolition of the Cluniac Priory of St Pancras in Lewes. After completing the work, Portinari submitted a detailed report to Cromwell, and this together with physical evidence from the site enables the demolition process to be reconstructed to an unusually extensive degree. First, the lead roof tiles were removed and melted down on site in specially-built portable furnaces. Once this was done, Portinari and his men dug tunnels under the walls and then set fires within them. These burned away the wooden props, causing the tunnels to cave in and bringing down the walls on top of them. Much of the rubble was subsequently cannibalised for building materials on construction sites in the area, and stones from the priory are still visible in the walls of Southover Grange.

Portinari was involved in the construction of Sandown Castle, Isle of Wight, in 1545 as "captain of the labourers". The accounts suggest that he had a miltary role at the fort, with allowances for his standard bearer and soldiers with a fife and a drum.

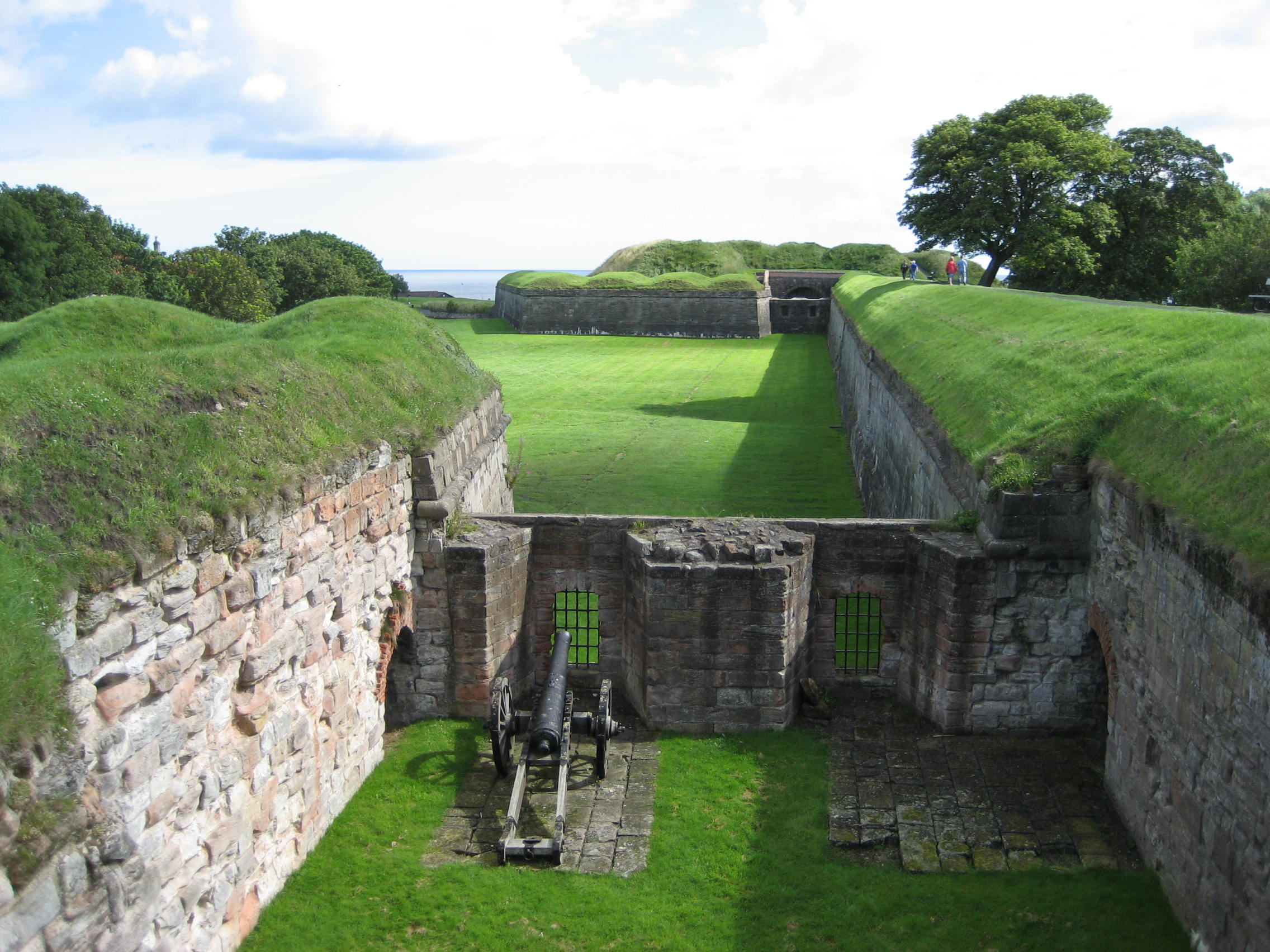
The trace italienne walls of Berwick-upon-Tweed

Portinari was willing to serve Henry's daughter, Elizabeth I, and was recommended by the diplomat Nicholas Throckmorton who met him in France. In 1560, he gave professional advice on the rebuilding of the town walls of Berwick-upon-Tweed, the vital border town between England and Scotland. The new fortifications were being constructed in the modern trace italienne style, so-called because it had originated in Italy during the Italian Wars, and Portinari's opinion was clearly highly valued on account of his Italian background. He proposed extending the walls east to the coast, which would bring the Magdalene Fields within the defensive perimeter and make the town considerably easier to defend against landward assault, but his scheme was rejected, apparently because it would have been too expensive.

There was some rivalry between Portinari and the English military engineer Richard Lee. In response, Portinari wrote to the Privy Council describing his visit to Berwick in October 1560 and the plans he had drawn. He mentioned that he had visited Edinburgh during the siege of Leith and made a plan of the French fortifications. He had also made plans for the defence of Portsmouth. Portinari had obtained designs for a portable cannon demonstrated in France by Bartolomeo Campi.

Portinari was retained as a consultant on the projects at Berwick for several years, along with his fellow-Italian Jacopo Aconcio, but there were frequent disagreements between them and the English chief engineer, Sir Richard Lee, continuing to at least 1564.

The date and circumstances of Portinari's death are not recorded, but it must have occurred after 1572, which is when he is last attested.

== Sources ==
- "Berwick-upon-Tweed: Northumberland Extensive Urban Survey" (PDF). Northumberland County Council. 2009.
- "Events in 1537-8". Lewes Priory Trust.
- Beverley, Tessa (2004). "Portinari, Sir Giovanni". Oxford Dictionary of National Biography (online ed.). Oxford University Press. doi:10.1093/ref:odnb/52154. (Subscription, Wikipedia Library access or UK public library membership required.)
- Herbert, Jim. "Berwick - A Garrison Town. Part 4: The Elizabethan Walls". Berwick Time Lines.
- MacIvor, Iain (1965). "The Elizabethan Fortifications of Berwick-upon-Tweed". The Antiquaries Journal. 45 (1): 64–96. doi:10.1017/S0003581500051568. S2CID 162430677.
