= Francesco Paciotto =

Italian sculptor

Pietro Francesco Tagliapietra known as Francesco Paciotto (1521 - 1591) was an Italian military and civil architect, born and died in Urbino.

== Biography ==
He was a pupil of Girolamo Genga at Urbino, before going to Rome to attend the Vitruvian Academy. He worked in Emilia for Farnese where Ottavio, second Duke of Parma and Piacenza, charged him for the first project, in 1558, of the Farnese palace in Piacenza. Following the wife of Duke Ottavio, Margaret of Austria who was appointed by Philip II of Spain governor of Flanders, he moved from Italy to Flanders where he built the citadel of Antwerp. Back to Italy he worked in Lucca where he contributed to design the fortified walls of the city.

The Duke of Alba commissioned Bartolomeo Campi to design improvements to Paciotto's work at Antwerp, but these were not carried out.
