= Palazzo Farnese, Piacenza =

Building in Emilia-Romagna, Italy

Coordinates: 45.0557°N 9.6961°E

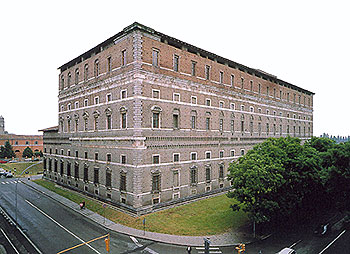
Palazzo Farnese.

The project for the façade of Palazzo Farnese, Piacenza, by Jacopo Barozzi da Vignola.

The court.

Palazzo Farnese is a palace in Piacenza, northern Italy.

== History ==
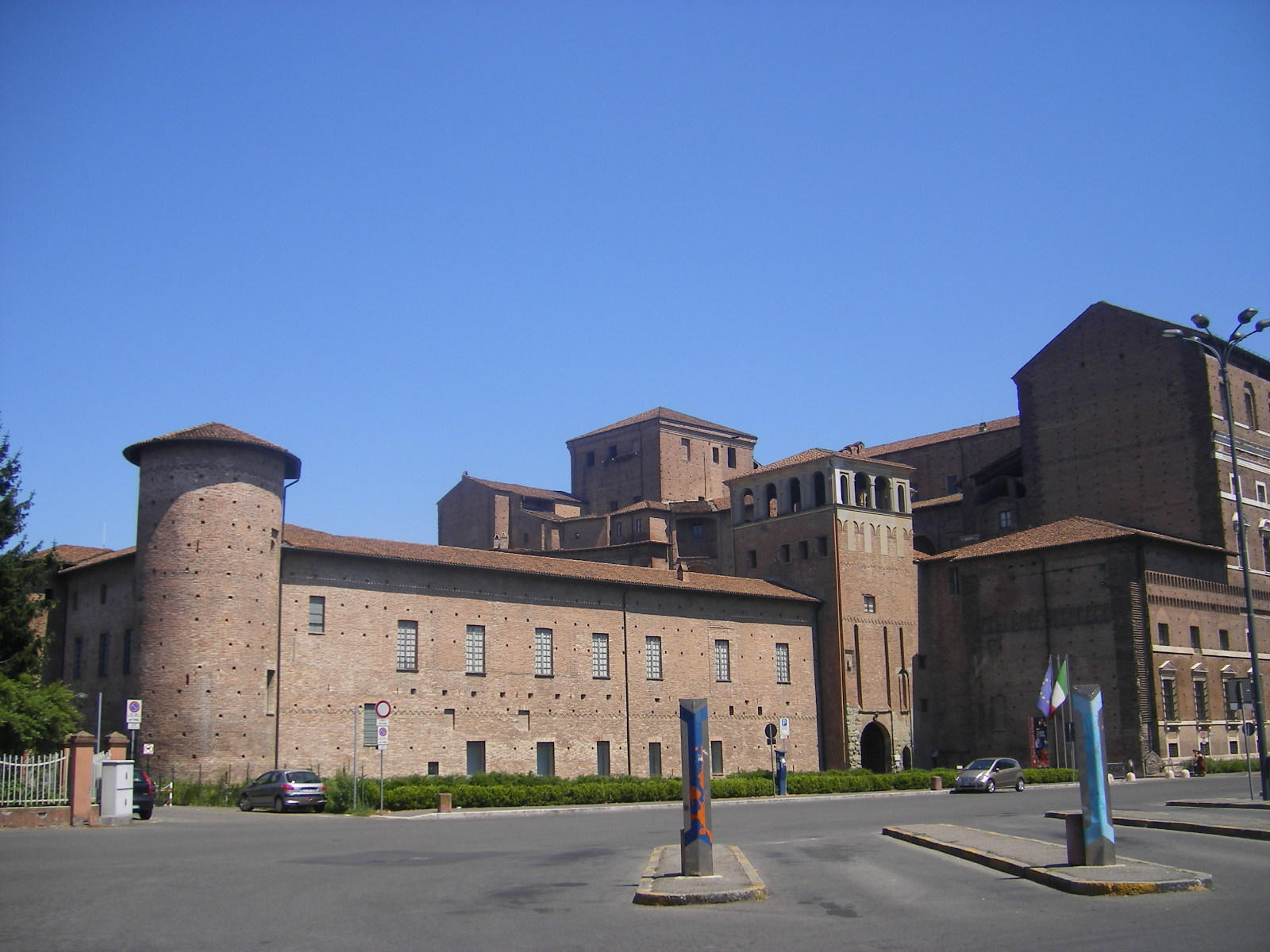
The older remaining part of the Visconti Citadel still shaped as fortress.

This large partly constructed palace is located on the banks of the River Po in the city of Piacenza in northern Italy. Ottavio Farnese inherited the Duchy of Parma and Piacenza from his father Pier Luigi Farnese, who was assassinated in a coup in 1547. In the aftermath of the assassination Spanish troops under the command of Ferrante Gonzaga occupied both Parma and Piacenza, but Ottavio refused to renounce his claim to the duchy. He retook Parma in 1551, with the help of King Henry II of France. Piacenza remained in Spanish hands until 1557 when, after the abdications of Charles V, Holy Roman Emperor, both Ottavio and his wife Margaret of Austria traveled to Brussels to negotiate with Philip II of Spain. It was agreed that the duchy should become a Spanish fief and that Piacenza should be returned to the Farnese family (with a garrison of Spanish soldiers remaining in its citadel).

The palace was commissioned by Ottavio's wife Margaret, daughter of Emperor Charles V. The new edifice was erected over a former fortress built by the Visconti in 1352, part of which can still be seen.

An initial design was made by Francesco Paciotto, from Urbino, and in 1558, the architect Giacomo Barozzi da Vignola, better known as Vignola, was brought in to revise the designs. Vignola had already been commissioned to design the Villa Farnese at Caprarola (Latium) for Cardinal Alessandro Farnese, the older brother of the duke. Vignola had to take Piacotto's design into account but significantly revised the design which was presented to the patrons in 1561. The drawings are for a vast palace on a scale paralleled only by the Vatican Palace in Italy; the rectangular plan is 113.25 metres by 88 metres and over 40 meters in height. The building works were entrusted to Giovanni Bernardo Della Valle, Giovanni Lavezzari and Bernardo Panizzari (Caramosino). The actual construction, however, made up only less than a half of Vignola's original project and lacked many of the planned architectural features.

The original plan called for a massive rectangular palace with three main floors, three towers, two ceremonial staircases and two spiral ones, each floor was to have two residential complexes (one for Ottavio, another for Margaret) which included an oratory, a chapel, three state rooms, service rooms and a private loggia; and on top of that it included two main loggias on the southern facade, an open theatre on the internal courtyard and Italian gardens that were to reach the main city walls opposite the Po river.

Ultimately the planned building far overestimated the financial capacities of the duchy and of the Farnese family itself, being a far larger palace than those built by other Italian families and even French and Spanish royalty, and even though subsequent Farnese dukes tried to continue the construction, it was finally declared finished in 1602.

Drawing of Giuseppe Garibaldi in the Museum of Risorgimento.

After the death of the last Farnese duke Antonio in 1731, the palace fell into disrepair. Restoration began only in the early 20th century and today the Palazzo Farnese at Piacenza houses an important series of museums and exhibitions.

== Ducal Chapel ==
The Ducal Chapel (Cappella Ducale or Cappella Grande) was used by the family for its religious rites. It is a hall on a square plan, turned into an octagon by the introduction of four apses at the corners. The sides have the same length as the chapel's height up to the hemispherical dome. The chapel is decorated with lilies from the Farnese coat of arms and Mannerist masks portraying angels. Other symbols referring to the Ducal family such as the unicorn, starfish, dolphins and turtles, appear in the large frieze.

== Museums and exhibitions ==
- In the Archaeological Museum is the famous 'Piacenza Liver', an Etruscan bronze of a liver with Etruscan writing that was possibly used for haruspicy or divination by the reading of animals entrails.
- The Gallery or Pinacoteca is housed in the so-called "Duchess Apartments", on the first floor. It contains paintings from the 16th-17th centuries once belonging to the Dukes' collections, as well as painting from former religious houses and churches. The most important artwork is the Madonna with the Young St John, by Sandro Botticelli. The museum was endowed in 2006 with the Collezione Rizzi-Vaccari. In consisted of 17 paintings and three sculptures from the 14th through 15th centuries, including works by Jacopo del Casentino, Andrea Bonaiuti, Simone de’ Crocifissi, and Giovanni da Milano.
- The Fasti Farnesiani ("Farnese's Splendours") Exhibitions
- Museum of the Italian Risorgimento
- Museum of Ancient Weapons, with 400 antique weapons and armours collected by the Piacentine nobleman Antonio Parma
- Museum of Coaches
- State Archives
- Collections of sculptures, frescoes, majolica ware, glassworks, and epigraphs, with works from the 12th to the 17th centuries.

== See also ==
- Palazzo Farnese, Rome
- Villa Farnese
