= Guidobaldo II della Rovere =

Guidobaldo II
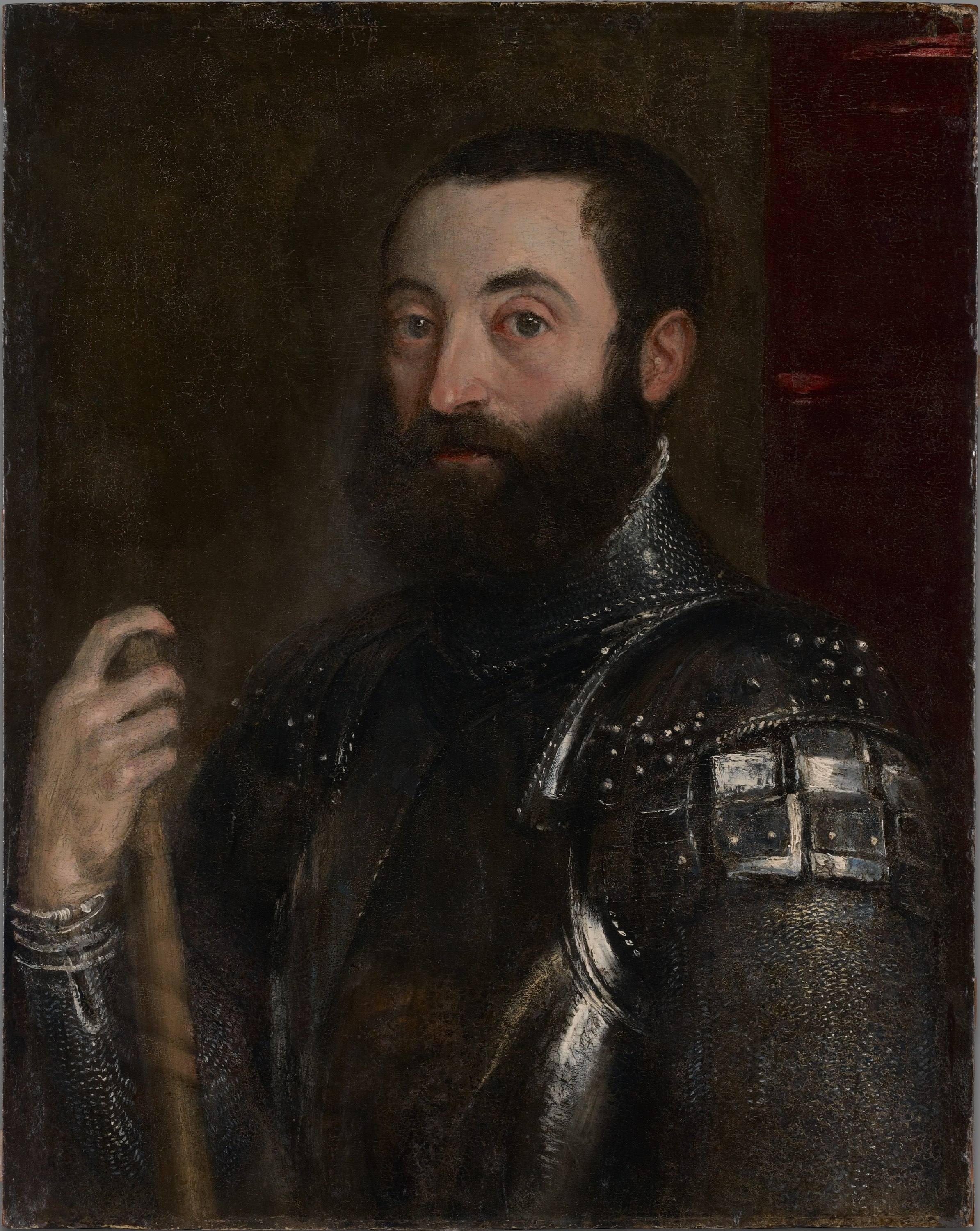
- Portrait by Titian, 1545

Duke of Urbino
- Reign: 20 October 1538 – 28 September 1574
- Predecessor: Francesco Maria I
- Successor: Francesco Maria II
- Born: 2 April 1514; Urbino, Duchy of Urbino
- Died: 28 September 1574 (aged 60); Pesaro, Duchy of Urbino
- Spouse: Giulia da Varano; Vittoria Farnese
- Issue: Virginia, Duchess of Gravina; Francesco Maria II, Duke of Urbino; Isabella, Princess of Bisignano; Lavinia, Princess of Francavilla
- House: Rovere
- Father: Francesco Maria I della Rovere
- Mother: Eleonora Gonzaga

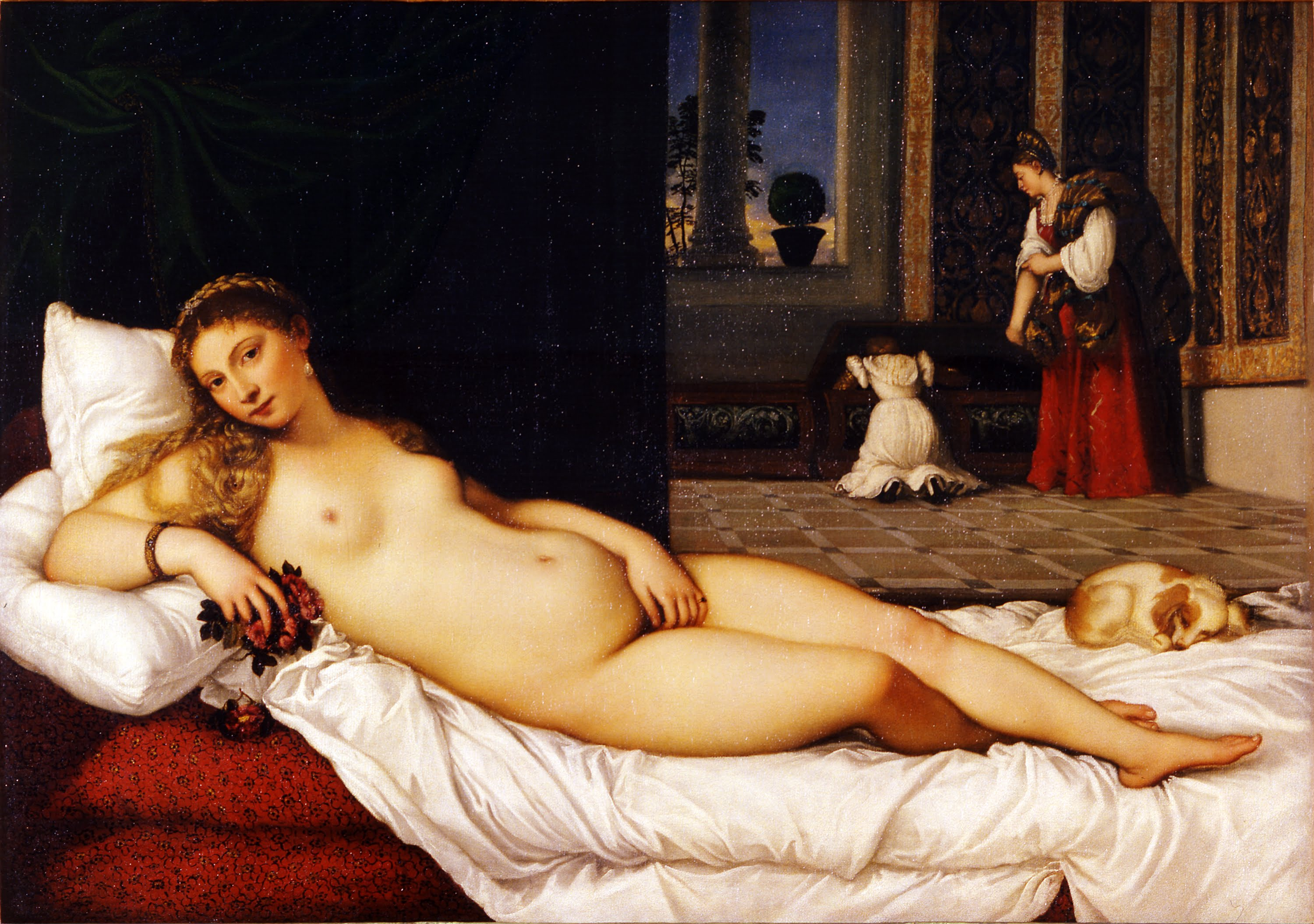
The portrait of Venus of Urbino has acquired its name from the Duchy of Urbino through Guidobaldo's title as the Duke of Urbino.

Guidobaldo II della Rovere (2 April 1514 – 28 September 1574) was an Italian condottiero, who succeeded his father Francesco Maria I della Rovere as Duke of Urbino from 1538 until his death in 1574. He was a member of the House of La Rovere. Guidobaldo was an important patron of the arts in general, and of Titian in particular, commissioning his own portrait, and buying Titian's Venus of Urbino.

== Early life ==
Guidobaldo was the son of Francesco Maria I della Rovere and Eleonora Gonzaga. In 1535, despite a papal ban, he married Giulia da Varano, daughter of the duke of Camerino and Caterina Cybo. In response to his marriage with Giulia, Pope Paul III excommunicated Guidobaldo, his bride, Giulia, his mother-in-law, Caterina Cybo, in 1535. Upon his installation as duke of Camerino, Paul III placed the duchy under interdict. Upon the assassination of his father, Guidobaldo became duke of Urbino in 1538.

Guidobaldo and Giulia had a child, Virginia Varana della Rovere, who married Frederico Borromeo.

== Career ==
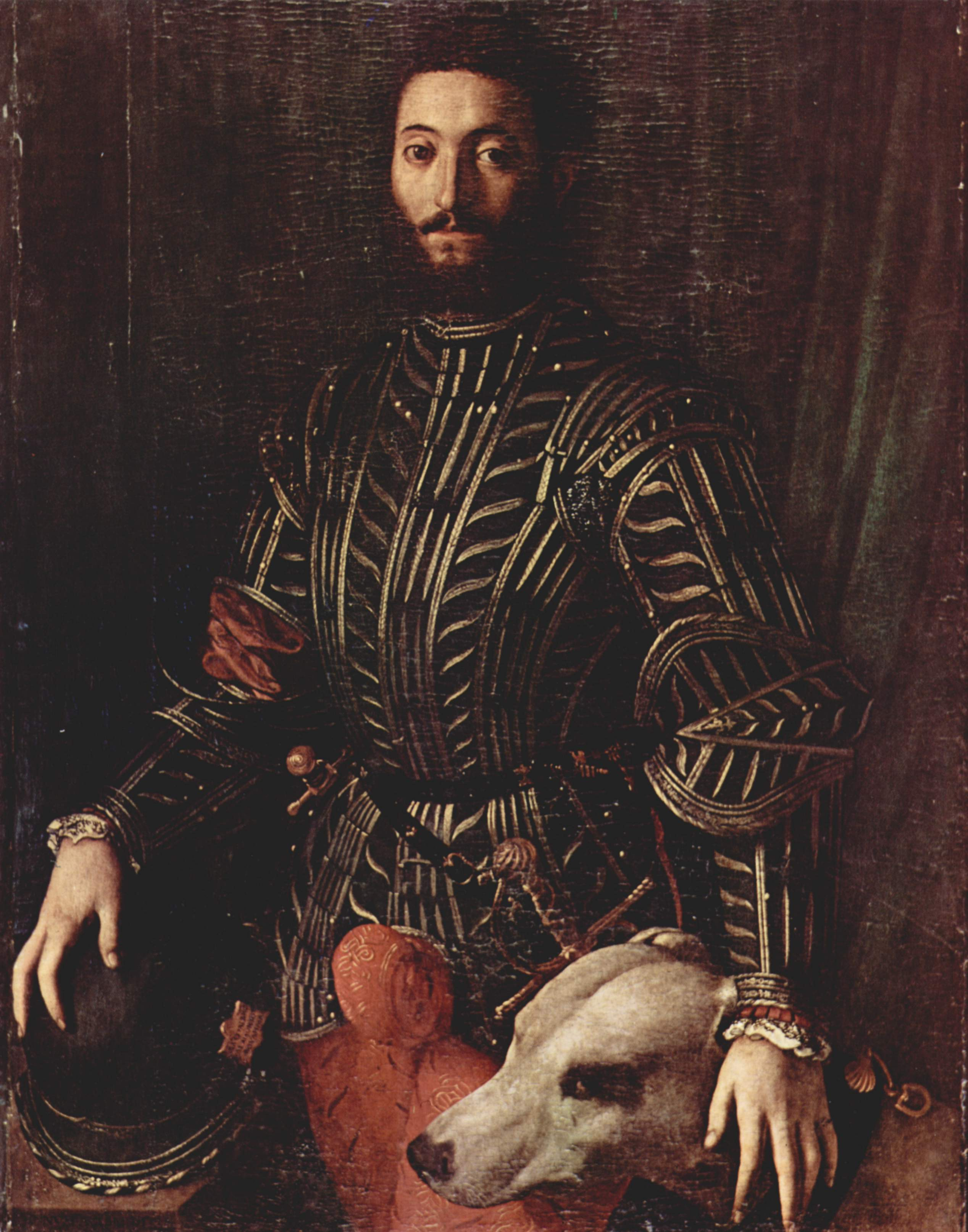
Portrait of the Duke of Urbino wearing an Armour by Bronzino, c. 1531–33, Uffizi

In 1546, he received a condotta as military leader (Governatore) by the Republic of Venice, for which his father had been a valiant commander during the Italian Wars. He employed the artist and armourer Bartolomeo Campi, who made him a suit of armour.

After the death of his first wife, Giulia, in 1548, he married Vittoria Farnese, the daughter of Pier Luigi Farnese, Duke of Parma and Gerolama Orsini. Later he was made Papal governor of Fano, receiving also the title of capitano generale (commander-in-chief) of the Papal States, as well as that of Prefect of Rome.

In 1559, he was hired by the King of Spain, helping Bernardo Sanseverino (who had married Isabella, one of Guidobaldo's daughters) in the war against the Ottoman Turks.

On 1 January 1573, a revolt rose against Guidobaldo in Urbino, due to the excessive tax burden that he was exerting over his state. He reacted by bloodily suppressing the riot.

== Personal life ==
Guidobaldo and Vittoria had:

- Francesco Maria II, who succeeded him as Duke of Urbino, married Lucrezia d'Este
- Isabella, wife of Niccolò Bernardino Sanseverino, 6° Prince of Bisignano.
- Lavinia, married Alfonso Félix de Ávalos Aquino y Gonzaga, Marquis del Vasto.

After falling ill during a voyage to Ferrara and Pesaro, he died in the latter town in 1574.

== Sources ==
- Ammannati, Laura Battiferra degli (2006). Laura Battiferra and Her Literary Circle: An Anthology: A Bilingual Edition. Translated by Kirkham, Victoria. University of Chicago Press.
- Brigden, Susan (2013). "Henry VIII and the Crusade against England". In Betteridge, Thomas; Lipscomb, Suzannah (eds.). Henry VIII and the Court: Art, Politics and Performance. Ashgate.
- Reiss, Sheryl E. (2013). "A Taxonomy of Art Patronage in Renaissance Italy". In Bohn, Babette; Saslow, James M. (eds.). A Companion to Renaissance and Baroque Art. Wiley-Blackwell.
- Robin, Diana (2007). Publishing Women: Salons, the Presses, and the Counter-Reformation in Sixteenth-Century Italy. The University of Chicago Press.
- Setton, Kenneth Meyer, ed. (1984). The Papacy and the Levant, 1204-1571. Vol. IV: The Sixteenth Century. American Philosophical Society.601

Preceded by Francesco Maria I della Rovere	Duke of Urbino 1538–1574	Succeeded by Francesco Maria II della Rovere
