= State Archives of Piacenza =

State archival institution in Piacenza, Italy

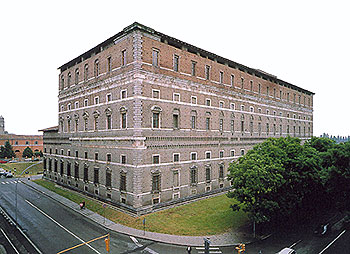
- Interactive map of State Archives of Piacenza
- 45°03′20″N 9°41′43″E
- Location: Piacenza, Emilia-Romagna, Italy
- Type: State archive
- Established: 16 October 1954

Building information
- Building: Palazzo Farnese
- Website: http://www.archiviodistatopiacenza.beniculturali.it

The State Archives of Piacenza (Italian: Archivio di Stato di Piacenza) is a public archival institution located in Piacenza, Italy. It preserves historical records produced by governmental and administrative institutions that operated in the province of Piacenza and forms part of the national archival network administered by the Italian Ministry of Culture.

The institution was established on 16 June 1954 as a Section of the State Archives and became an autonomous State Archives on 30 September 1963. Since 1976, it has been housed on the second floor of the Palazzo Farnese.

The archive preserves documentation relating to the historical institutions of the territory, including records from the administrations of the Duchy of Parma and Piacenza, as well as those produced by the local offices of the Kingdom of Italy and the Italian Republic. It also holds records from courts, state offices, and other public institutions active in the province.

== Sources ==
- Bulla, Gian Paolo, ed. (2020). Guida dell'Archivio di Stato di Piacenza (PDF). Ministero dei beni e delle attività culturali e del turismo. Archivio di Stato di Piacenza.
- "Archivio di Stato di Piacenza". Sistema archivistico nazionale (in Italian). Istituto centrale per gli archivi.
