= Visconti Citadel (Piacenza) =

Castle in northern Italy

- Cittadella Viscontea di Piacenza
- Piacenza, Emilia-Romagna, Northern Italy
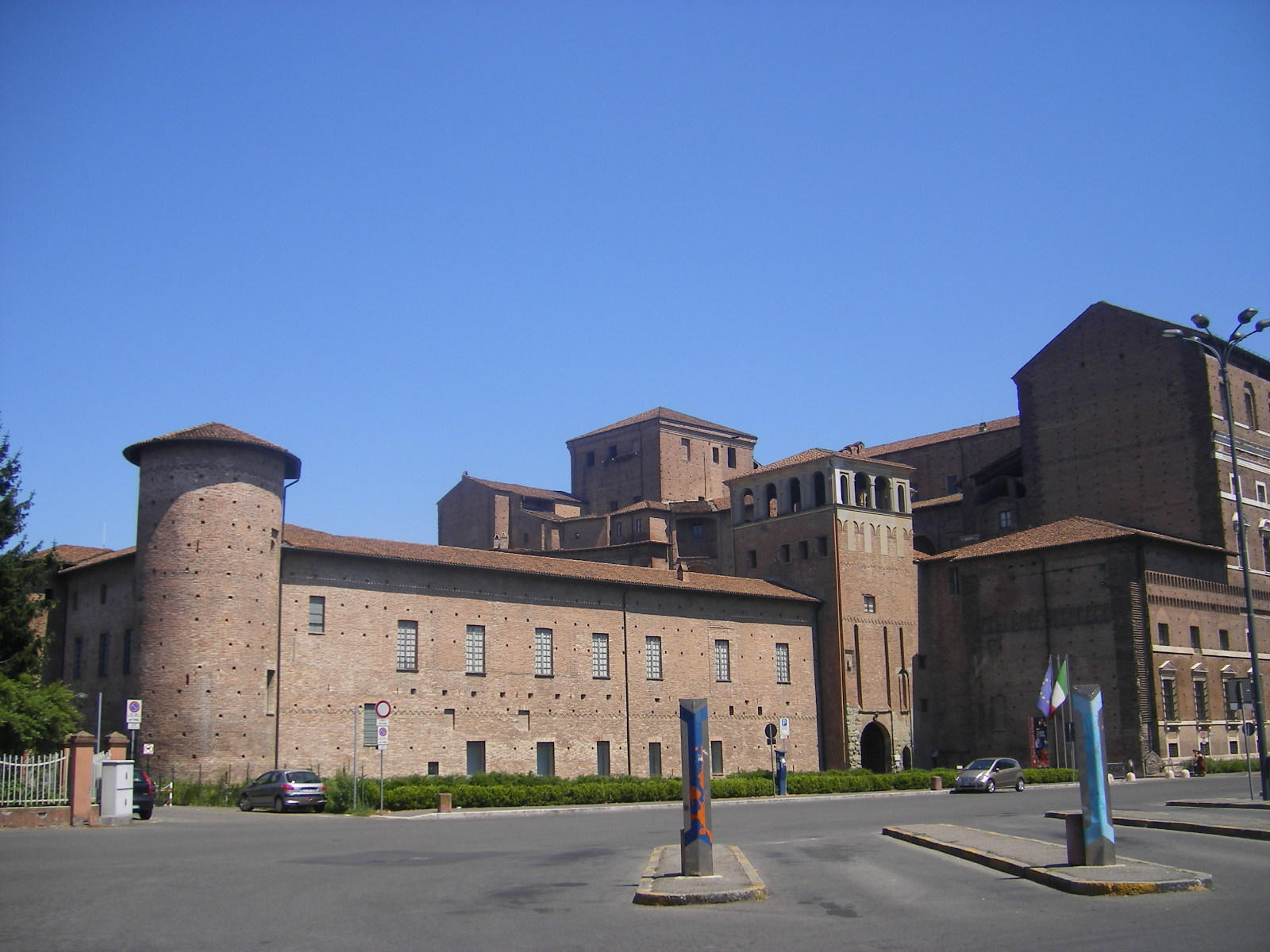
- The west corner; on the right, beyond the entrance tower, the uncompleted Palazzo Farnese

Site information
- Type: Citadel
- Owner: Municipality of Piacenza
- Open to the public: Yes
- Condition: Half preserved

Location
- Coordinates: 45°03′20″N 9°41′46″E
- Height: 20 metres (66 ft) (towers)
- Length: 90 metres (300 ft) (longer sides)

Site history
- Built: 14th century
- Built by: Galeazzo I Visconti, Galeazzo II Visconti
- Materials: Bricks

The Visconti Citadel of Piacenza is a fortification erected by the Visconti of Milan in the 14th century in Piacenza, Emilia-Romagna, northern Italy. In the 16th century, a new building (Palazzo Farnese) was planned and initiated on the Citadel's site but remained uncompleted. Therefore, about half of the Citadel was not destroyed and survived until today.

== History ==
=== Origins (14th century) ===
Galeazzo I Visconti initiated a fortification (Old Citadel) around 1315. Its construction was probably interrupted in 1322 when the Visconti abandoned Piacenza. Azzone Visconti retook Piacenza in 1337. The building was resumed only in 1373, at the behest of Galeazzo II. The new Citadel incorporated the old fortification.

The Citadel had a rectangular plan with four round towers at every corner. The entire rectangle measured approximately 90 metres (300 ft) by 70 metres (230 ft) m. The four towers were about 20 metres (66 ft) high. The four sides were interrupted by entrance towers with drawbridges. A deep moat ran around the new Citadel. It was filled in the early 1800s.

Its considerable size makes the Citadel comparable to the Pavia castle, the largest of the Visconti castles.

=== Partial demolition to make room for Palazzo Farnese (16th century) ===
In 1558, the Farnese family began the construction of the Farnese Palace after a project by the architect Vignola. The project included a new building on the perimeter of the Citadel that preserved the moat. From that year on, therefore, the demolitions began starting from the southeastern side.

The construction of Palazzo Farnese was interrupted in the 17th century and was never resumed. Therefore, on the initial perimeter of the Citadel, one half was occupied by Palazzo Farnese, while in the other half, the Citadel has survived until today.

== Today ==
The Visconti Citadel and Palazzo Farnese's complex today hosts the Piacenza Civic Museum.

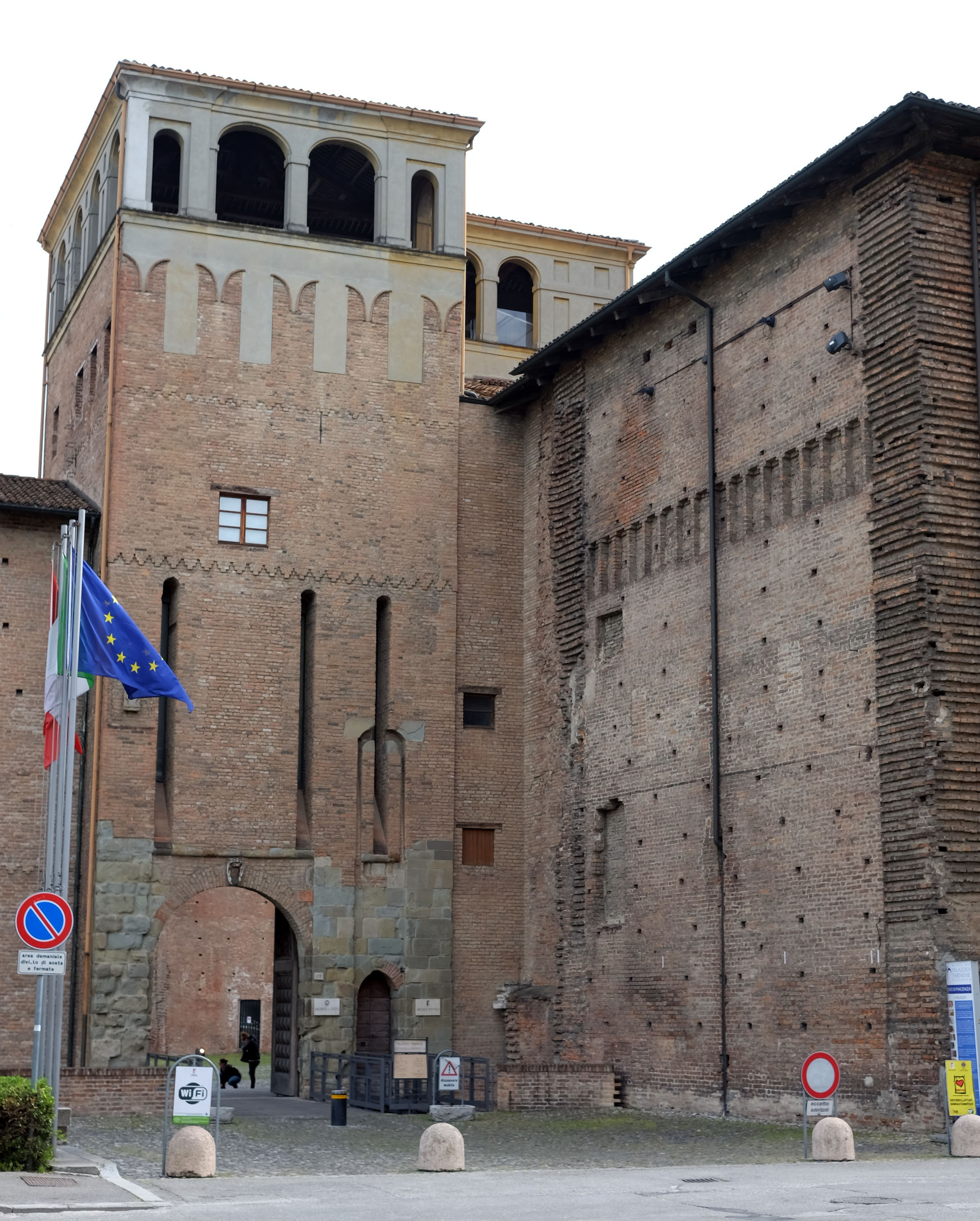
Main entrance; on the right, Palazzo Farnese

== See also ==
- Palazzo Farnese, Piacenza

== Sources ==
- Perogalli, Carlo (1972). Castelli e rocche di Emilia e Romagna (in Italian). Milano: Görlich Editore.
- Artocchini, Carmen (1983). Castelli piacentini (in Italian). Piacenza: Tipolitografia TEP.
