= Sandown Castle, Isle of Wight =

Device Fort built at Sandown on the Isle of Wight

Sandown Castle
- Sandown, Isle of Wight, England
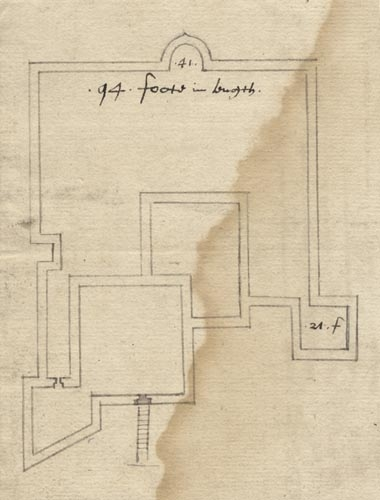
- 1559 plan of Sandown Castle

Site information
- Type: Device fort
- Condition: Destroyed

Location
- Location within Isle of Wight
- Coordinates: 50.65669°N 1.14691°W

Site history
- Built: 1545
- Demolished: 1631

Sandown Castle was a Device Fort built at Sandown on the Isle of Wight by Henry VIII in 1545 to protect against the threat of French attack. Constructed from stone with angular bastions, its design was a hybrid of Italian military architectural thinking with traditional English military design. The site was raided by a French force that summer while the fortification was still being constructed. The site suffered from coastal erosion and the castle was demolished in 1631.

== History ==
=== 16th century ===
==== Background ====
Sandown Castle was built as a consequence of international tensions between England, France and the Holy Roman Empire in the final years of the reign of King Henry VIII. Traditionally the Crown had left coastal defences to the local lords and communities, only taking a small role in building and maintaining fortifications, and while France and the Empire remained in conflict with one another, maritime raids were common but an actual invasion of England seemed unlikely. Modest defences, based around simple blockhouses and towers, existed in the south-west and along the Sussex coast, with a few more impressive works in the north of England, but in general the fortifications were very limited in scale.

In 1533, Henry then broke with Pope Paul III to annul the long-standing marriage to his wife, Catherine of Aragon and remarry. This resulted in France and the Empire declaring an alliance against Henry in 1538, and the Pope encouraging the two countries to attack England. Henry responded in 1539 by ordering, through an instruction called a "device", the construction of fortifications along the most vulnerable parts of the coast. The immediate threat passed, but resurfaced in 1544, with France threatening an invasion across the Channel, backed by her allies in Scotland. Henry therefore issued another device in 1544 to further improve the country's defences, particularly along the south coast.

==== Construction ====
Built between April and September 1545 to protect the south-east coast of the Isle of Wight, Sandown Castle overlooked Sandown Bay. It may have been designed by Richard Lee. The Castle was constructed by the Italian engineer Giovanni Portinari, called "captain of labourers" in the accounts, and the surveyor William Ridgeway at a cost of £2,400. (Note: Comparing early modern costs and prices with those of the modern period is challenging. £2,400 in 1545 could be equivalent to between £1.03 million and £474.3 million in 2014, depending on the price comparison used. For comparison, the total royal expenditure on all the Device Forts across England between 1539–47 came to £376,500, with St Mawes, for example, costing £5,018, and Sandgate £5,584.) Designed around a central courtyard, it had a square tower and two angular bastions on one side, and a circular bastion looking out to sea. The rear of the stone defences was protected by a moat, and the castle had a wooden pier for boats to dock at.

The angular bastions echoed contemporary Italian thinking on military architecture, and may have been influenced by Richard Lee, the King's Surveyor of Works, as well as by Portinari's own continental background. Despite being relatively advanced for an English fortification, the castle did not feature the more fashionable Italianate "arrow-head" bastion design used at nearby Yarmouth Castle and has been critiqued by historians: Andrew Saunders describes it as an imperfect "hybrid" of English and continental ideas, John Hale as a timid, confused flirtation with modern designs.

Before the castle could be completed, however, the French attacked. Admiral Claude d'Annebault crossed the Channel and arrived off the Solent with 200 ships on 19 July, where the local authorities feared Sandown Castle might be the target of a night attack. 2,000 French soldiers men landed on the Isle of Wight and attacked Sandown, where labourers were still present. Their advance soon stalled, however, and the French retreated back to their fleet, bringing the invasion threat to an end; the castle was finally completed after their departure.

=== 17th century ===
By the 17th century, coastal erosion had undermined the castle's walls. In 1627, Charles I announced that he would repair the fortification but instead the ruins were dismantled in 1631 by Sir John Oglander. A new fortification, Sandown Fort was built in its place, positioned further inland, but the possible remains of the foundations of the original castle are still visible along the shore at low tide.

== See also ==
- Castles in Great Britain and Ireland

== Bibliography ==
- Adams, W. H. Davenport (1884). Isle of Wight: Its History, Topography and Antiquities (new and revised ed.). London, UK: T. Nelson and Sons. OCLC 264864979.
- Biddle, Martin; Hiller, Jonathon; Scott, Ian; Streeten, Anthony (2001). Henry VIII's Coastal Artillery Fort at Camber Castle, Rye, East Sussex: An Archaeological Structural and Historical Investigation. Oxford, UK: Oxbow Books. ISBN 0904220230.
- Hale, J. R. (1983). Renaissance War Studies. London, UK: Hambledon Press. ISBN 0907628176.
- Harrington, Peter (2007). The Castles of Henry VIII. Oxford, UK: Osprey Publishing. ISBN 9781472803801.
- King, D. J. Cathcart (1991). The Castle in England and Wales: An Interpretative History. London, UK: Routledge Press. ISBN 9780415003506.
- Morley, B. M. (1976). Henry VIII and the Development of Coastal Defence. London, UK: Her Majesty's Stationery Office. ISBN 0116707771.
- Potter, Henry (2011). Henry VIII and Francis I: The Final Conflict, 1540–47. Leiden, the Netherlands: Koninklijke Brill NV. ISBN 9789004204317.
- Saunders, Andrew (1989). Fortress Britain: Artillery Fortifications in the British Isles and Ireland. Liphook, UK: Beaufort. ISBN 1855120003.
- Thompson, M. W. (1987). The Decline of the Castle. Cambridge, UK: Cambridge University Press. ISBN 1854226088.
