= Vittoria Farnese, Duchess of Urbino =

Vittoria Farnese
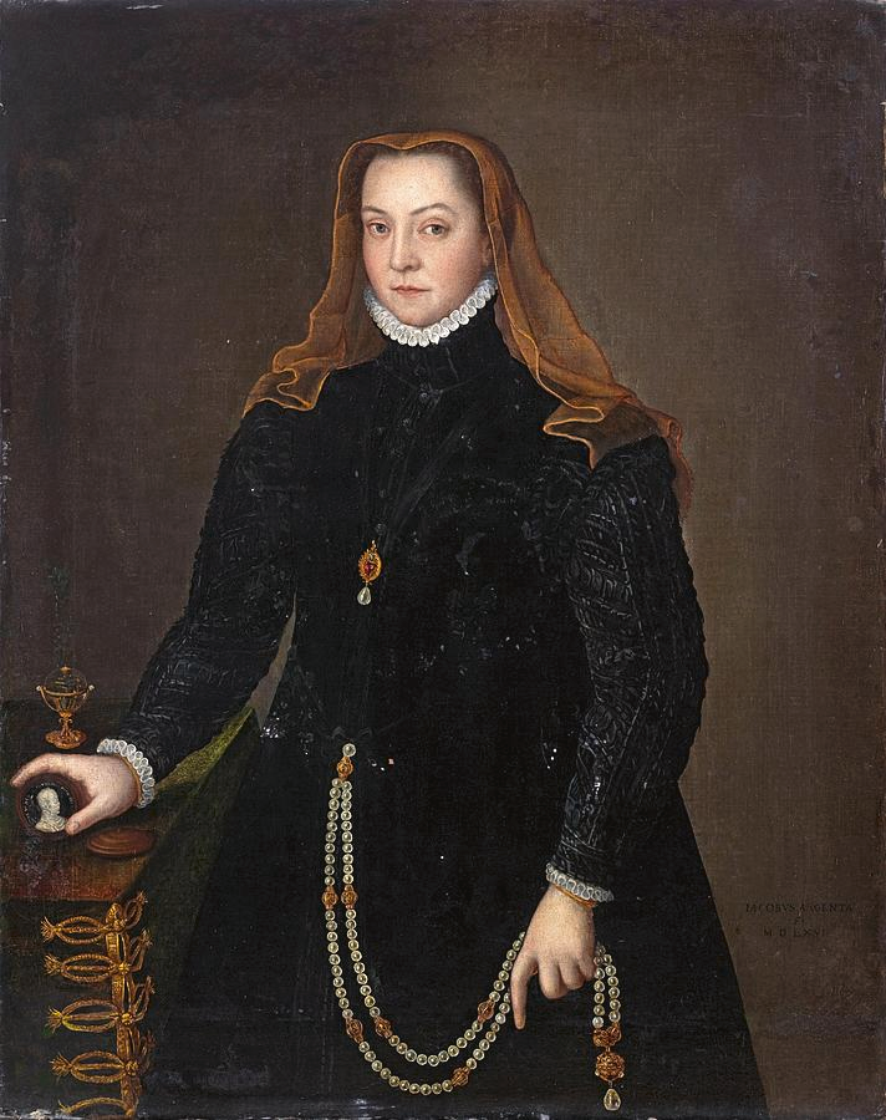
- Portrait by Giacomo Vighi, 1566

Duchess consort of Urbino
- Tenure: 26 January 1548 – 28 September 1574
- Born: 10 August 1519; Valentano, Macerata, Lazio, Italy
- Died: 13 December 1602 (aged 83); Pesaro, Pesaro e Urbino, Marche, Italy
- Burial: Church of the Convent of the Sisters of Corpus Christi, Pesaro
- Spouse: Guidobaldo II della Rovere, Duke of Urbino (m. 1548–1574); his death
- Issue: Francesco Maria II della Rovere, Duke of Urbino; Isabella della Rovere, Princess of Bisignano; Lavinia della Rovere, Marchioness del Vasto; Others six
- House: Farnese (by birth) della Rovere (by marriage)
- Father: Pier Luigi Farnese
- Mother: Gerolama Orsini

Vittoria Farnese, also known as Vittoria, Princess of Parma (Italian: Vittoria, Principessa di Parma), and by her married name Vittoria Farnese della Rovere (10 August 1519 – 13 December 1602), was an Italian noblewoman, Duchess consort of Urbino from 1548 until 1574 by marriage to Guidobaldo II della Rovere, Duke of Urbino.

== Life ==
=== Family and early years ===
Born on 10 August 1519 at the family castle at Valentano in Tuscany (current province of Viterbo), Vittoria was the first child and only daughter of Pier Luigi Farnese, Duke of Castro, Parma and Piacenza, and Gerolama Orsini. Her paternal grandparents were Cardinal Alessandro Farnese (who in 1534 became in Pope Paul III) and his mistress Silvia Ruffini; and her maternal grandparents were the Condottiero Ludovico Orsini, Count of Pitigliano and Giulia Conti. Vittoria grew up in the castle of Gradoli and was mainly raised by her mother, almost not seeing her father, who was on military campaigns. She received a good education at home.

=== Matrimonial projects ===
The several marriage projects in which Vittoria was considered were handled by her paternal grandfather, Pope Paul III and her brother, Cardinal Alessandro Farnese. An attempt to give her in marriage to a member of the French Royal House of Valois were unsuccessful; in addition, negotiations for a marriage with either Cosimo I de' Medici, Duke of Florence, Fabrizio Colonna di Paliano and Emmanuel Philibert of Savoy, Prince of Piedmont never came into fruition. In 1539, after the death of Empress Isabella of Portugal, Vittoria was proposed by her family as a wife to Emperor Charles V, who rejected the offer.

Vittoria was about 30-years-old (a quite advanced aged for an unmarried noblewoman at that time) when the next matrimonial project of her family finally proved successful. In February 1547, Guidobaldo II della Rovere, Duke of Urbino, was widowed. His late wife Giulia da Varano bring as a dowry the Duchy of Camerino, but failed to provide a surviving male heir for her husband, thus the Duke of Urbino began preparations for a new marriage. Negotiations for the marriage of Vittoria and Guidobaldo II della Rovere were led by Cardinals Alessandro Farnese and Ercole Gonzaga. The representative of Guidobaldo II in Rome described Vittoria as a modest, pious and gracious girl. The bride's family gave her a dowry of 60,000 ducats as well as jewelry, gold and silver items worth 20,000 ducats. The marriage per procura was celebrated in Rome on 29 June 1547; at this time, the groom was in the service of the Republic of Venice.

=== Marriage and issue ===
In Urbino on 30 January 1548, the official wedding of Victoria Farnese and Guidobaldo II della Rovere took place. From his first marriage, the Duke of Urbino had a daughter, Virginia. During her marriage, Vittoria gave birth to nine children, of whom only three survived infancy:

- Francesco Maria (10 February 1549 – 23 April 1631), who in 1623 succeeded his father as Duke of Urbino under the name Francesco Maria II; married firstly in 1570 with Lucrezia d'Este and secondly in 1599 with Livia della Rovere. The last ruling Duke, upon his death without surviving male issue the Duchy of Urbino was merged to the Papal States.
- Giovanni Pietro (1551–1554).
- Eleonora (1552–1553).
- Isabella (1 August 1552 – 6 July 1619), married in 1565 with Niccolò Bernardino Sanseverino, Prince of Bisignano.
- Costanza (born and died 1553).
- Alessandro (born and died 1556).
- Federico (1557–1560).
- Lavinia Feltria (16 January 1558 – 7 June 1632), married in 1583 with Alfonso Felice II d'Ávalos, Marquis del Vasto.
- Vittoria (1561–1566).

In addition to her children, Vittoria raised her nieces Clelia (illegitimate daughter of her brother Cardinal Alessandro Farnese) and Lavinia (illegitimate daughter of her other brother, Ottavio Farnese, Duke of Parma). She also took care of the upbringing and education of Ippolito and Giuliano, the illegitimate sons of her brother-in-law, Cardinal Giulio della Rovere.

=== Duchess of Urbino ===
Soon after the wedding, Vittoria received from her husband Gradara Castle, which she held as her personal property until her Guidobaldo II's death in 1574. In 1552 she tried to reform the municipal charter given to the town as early as 1363 by the Malatesta family, the former owners of Gradara. According to contemporary sources, the Duchess was well aware of all matters in the possessions of her husband and used this in favor of her grandfather-pontiff to strengthen the position of the Duchy of Urbino. She acted as a mediator in resolving disputes between family members. In 1569 she managed to convince her brother-in-law, Cardinal Giulio della Rovere, to cede the Duchy of Sora to his nephew Francesco Maria, Vittoria's son. In 1579, Francesco Maria sold this feud to the Boncompagni family to pay off part of the debts he inherited from his late father.

The Duchess's religious views differed somewhat from those of the current church views; so, she gave great importance to the Holy Scriptures and was of the opinion that marriage is higher than celibacy. In foreign policy, Vittoria held a pro-imperial orientation and was a strong supporter of the House of Habsburg. She managed to secure partial self-government for Gradara and received a number of tax privileges. Under her, silk began to be produced in the Duchy. In 1562 she was able to negotiate with the rebels in Gubbio, but an attempt to negotiate with the rebels in Urbino in 1572–1573 ended in failure. A the end, the uprising was brutally suppressed by her husband.

As a widow, Vittoria lived for some time at the court of her son. But due to disagreements that arose between them, in July 1582 she left for her homeland Parma, where she supported her niece Margherita Farnese after her unsuccessful marriage with Vincenzo Gonzaga, Hereditary Prince of Mantua. The following year, Vittoria returned to Urbino to arranged the marriage of her youngest daughter Lavinia Feltria, giving her a dowry in the amount of 80,000 scudi. Disagreements between her and her son intensified, and the Dowager Duchess left Urbino again in June 1584, returning only in March 1588. She suffered from her son's unsuccessful marriage: Vittoria's daughter-in-law, Lucrezia d'Este was fifteen years older than Francesco Maria II and was found to be sterile; only in August 1578 the Holy See allowed the couple to live separately, but their marriage wasn't annulled. Lucrezia returned to Ferrara but continued to be the Duchess consort of Urbino until her death in 1598, when Francesco Maria II was finally free to remarry —the bride was the Duke's second cousin, 14-year-old Livia della Rovere, who was chosen by Vittoria herself. The Duke of Urbino wasn't happy in this second union, too, but managed to produce the long-hoped heir, Federico Ubaldo della Rovere, born in 1605, three years after Vittoria's death.

Isabella, the eldest and favorite daughter of the Dowager Duchess also had marital problems. Reportedly ugly and deformed, she suffered the abuse of her husband the Prince of Bisgnano, and often sought refuge with her mother. Victoria's relationship with her other youngest daughter, Lavinia Feltria, also remained tense. The Dowager Duchess was supported by her brother, Cardinal Alessandro Farnese and her nieces Clelia and Lavinia, whom she raised.

The later years of the Dowager Duchess were spent in Pesaro. Shortly before her death, her health was completely damaged and stopped interfering in the reign of her son, and the relationship between them became calm. Vittoria Farnese died in Pesaro on 13 December 1602 aged 83 and remains were buried in the local Church of the Convent of the Sisters of Corpus Christi at Pesaro.

== In culture ==
Numerous poetic and prose works have been dedicated to Vittoria Farnese. Laura Battiferri dedicated The Seven Penitential Psalms to her. The humanist Antonio Brucioli, who was persecuted by the Inquisition, dedicated several spiritual poems to her. There are three known portraits of Vittoria Farnese: one made by an unknown author from the circle of Titian and currently at the Museum of Fine Arts in Budapest, another made by Giacomo Vighi (currently in a private European collection) and the other a copy of this one made by Camilla Guerierri who is currently at the Civic Museum of Palazzo Mosca in Pesaro.
