= Clelia Farnese =

Italian noblewoman

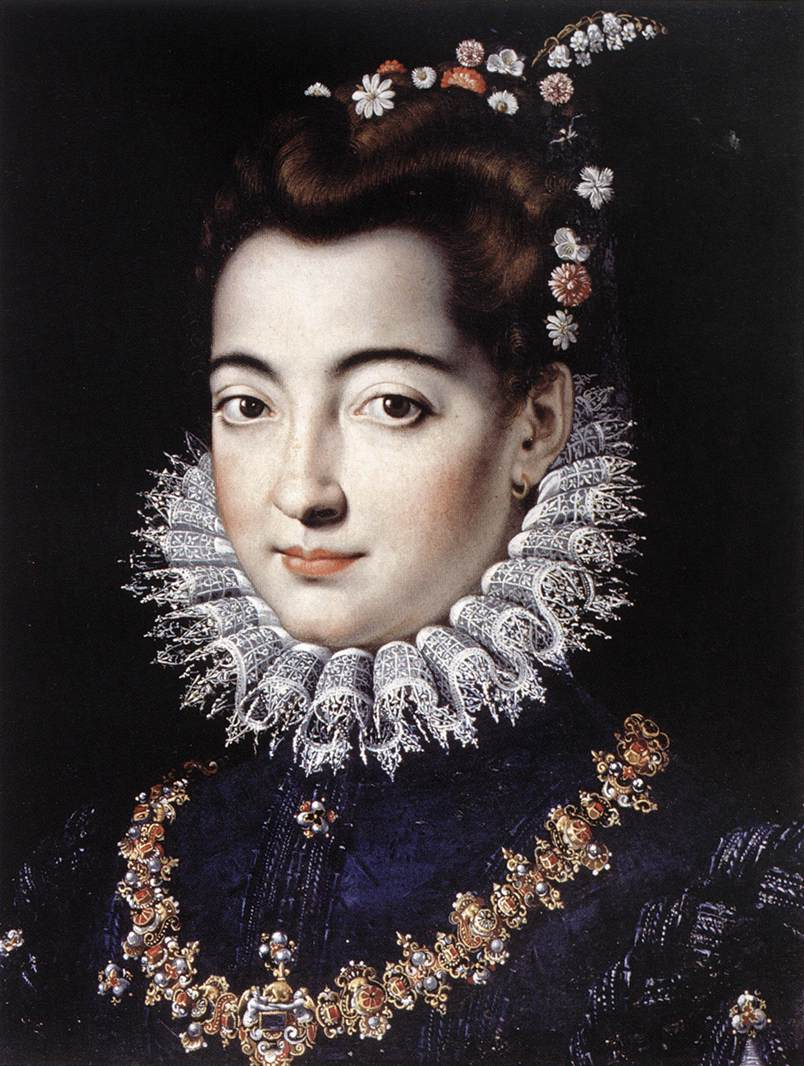
- Portrait of a Lady, by Jacopo Zucchi, ca. 1570. Currently displayed at the Galleria Nazionale d'Arte Antica, Palazzo Barberini and Palazzo Corsini, Rome. Art historians identified as a presumed portrait of Clelia.
- Full name: Clelia Farnese
- Born: 1552/1556; Paris, Parma or Rome
- Died: 11 September 1613 (aged 61-57); Rome
- Spouses: Giovan Giorgio Cesarini, Marquis of Civitanova (m. 1571–1585); his death Marco III Pio di Savoia, Lord of Sassuolo (m. 1587–1599); his death
- Issue: Giuliano Cesarini, Marquis of Civitanova
- Father: Cardinal Alessandro Farnese

Clelia Farnese (1552/1556 – 11 September 1613), was an Italian noblewoman, member of the House of Farnese, and by her two marriages Marchioness of Civitanova and Lady of Sassuolo. According to contemporaries, she was one of the most beautiful women of her time. She ruled as regent of the Lordship of Sassuolo during the absence of her second spouse Marco III Pio di Savoia, Lord of Sassuolo, in 1590-1594 and 1595-1599.

== Life ==
=== Birth and early years ===
Clelia Farnese was the great-granddaughter of Pope Paul III Clelia's exact place and date of birth are unknown. According to written sources, she was 61-years-old at the time of her death; consequently, she must be born in or around 1552, presumably in Paris, where her father, Cardinal Alessandro Farnese was at that time, from one of his many mistresses. Previously, the date of her birth was considered to be before 1556, that is, until the year in which Cardinal Alessandro Farnese returned from Paris to Parma. However, other sources, which contain Clelia's horoscope, say that she was born on 22 October 1557, and the cities of Parma or Rome are called the place of her birth. In favor of the year 1552 as the time of her birth was the day of the celebration of her betrothal with Giovan Giorgio Cesarini, who took place on 23 April 1566 and where Clelia is first mentioned in a contemporary written source. According to church canons, an engagement could not be concluded with a girl younger than 12-years-old.

The identity of Clelia's mother is also unknown and "shrouded in the most impenetrable silence". According to historian Patrizia Rosini, she could be the French noblewoman Claude de Beaune de Semblançay (d. 1568), Dame de Châteaubrun, a lady-in-waiting and confidant of Catherine de' Medici. According to Giovanni Battista Spaccini, a chronicler from Modena, Clelia's mother was a Roman washerwoman. According to the historian Gigliola Fragnito, she was one of the court ladies that Cardinal Farnese had brought with him.

Expecting to become Pope, Cardinal Alessandro Farnese concealed the existence of his illegitimate daughter. For this reason, Clelia's first seven years are shrouded in mystery, but the few remaining testimonies lead one to believe that she was entrusted to her paternal grandmother Gerolama Orsini, Dowager Duchess of Parma. It is known that she attended the official betrothal ceremony of her granddaughter at the Cesarini Palace in Rome. A letter from the Dowager Duchess from 16 February 1567 sent to her son the Cardinal, in which informs him about how his daughter lives, which could proved that Gerolama Orsini closely monitored Clelia's upbringing; in addition, the Duchy of Castro, where Gerolama made her residence, was in fact more isolated and "less conspicuous". Only after the death of her grandmother in 1569, Clelia was undoubtedly placed under the care of her paternal aunt, Vittoria Farnese, Duchess of Urbino, and arrived at the court in Pesaro, where she was brought up for some time with her cousin Lavinia Feltria della Rovere.

=== First marriage ===
Already in November 1564, Cardinal Alessandro Farnese began searching for a worthy candidate for the hand of his daughter. The choice of the cardinal fell on the Giovan Giorgio Cesarini, heir of the Marquisate of Civitanova. The candidate's father, Marquis Giuliano Cesarini, had large debts, and hoped to solve these problems by arranging the marriage of his only son and heir to the illegitimate daughter of a wealthy prelate. Through the mediation of Duchess Vittoria Farnese of Urbino and the groom's mother, Giulia Colonna, Clelia and Giovan Giorgio were officially betrothed in early 1566 on a date not earlier than 23 April in a ceremony held at the Cesarini Palace in the Largo di Torre Argentina. The parties entered into a marriage contract and an imminent wedding celebration was expected; however, due to the death on 18 June of the same year of Marquis Giuliano Cesarini and the financial difficulties that arose from his widow and heir, the wedding celebrations had to be postponed for almost five years. Finally, on 3 February 1571, Clelia leave the court of Pesaro for the possession of the Cesarini family in Rocca Sinibalda, where on 13 February, in the presence of the vicar general, Bishop of Rieti and representatives of the Roman patrician families, the wedding ceremony took place. The groom's mother wanted to arrange big celebrations, but the bride's father convinced her not to. The Cardinal Farnese did not attend his daughter's wedding, as he did not want to publicly confirm his paternity. Clelia's dowry was settled in the amount of 30,000 gold scudi, paid in installments during the first three years of her marriage, which made it possible to improve the financial situation of the Cesarini family.

For the first three months, the young couple lived in the Cesarini estate in Rocca Sinibalda and Civita Lavinia, after which Cardinal Farnese allowed them to return to Rome. Already pregnant with her first child, in May 1571, Clelia, together with her husband, quietly arrived at the Eternal City at night. The couple settled in the Palazzetto del Burcardo. Cardinal Farnese controlled their behavior from a distance; his influence over his son-in-law became even greater when Clelia's mother-in-law died in July of that year. Representatives of the Roman patrician families associated with the Cardinal Farnese often visited the young couple for the purpose of "affectionate surveillance", and the reports sent to the Cardinal constitute to posterity an important, albeit not impartial, document of Clelia's biographical events. It was said that Clelia, despite the advice of relatives and priests, thought only of entertainment. During the night of 9–10 November 1571, she gave birth a daughter, but a few days after her baptism who took place on 19 November, the child died.

For a while Clelia gave up entertainment, and soon became pregnant again. On 14 September 1572, she gave birth a son. Three days later, the father of the newborn reported his "satisfaction" to his wife's uncle Duke Ottavio Farnese. Clelia was happy to have given birth to an heir: visiting her, in accordance with tradition, local aristocrats noticed that she looked "much better than if she was alone". The child was baptized on 28 September 1572 with the name Giuliano, in honor of his late paternal grandfather. The boy was the only surviving child in the family: Clelia had no other children. Many times it was believed that she could be pregnant again, and all kind of remedies were tried, from special diets to spa treatments, but nothing proved fruitful.

Clelia happily led a social life, took part in the festive events of the aristocracy. When Pope Gregory XIII was enthroned, the Roman patricians got rid of the restrictions imposed by his predecessor. The Marquis and Marchioness of Civitanova began to often receive guests at dinners, balls with theatrical performances that lasted until dawn.

At the same time, Clelia was greatly concerned about her son's frequent illnesses in the first years of his life. The state of the infant at one point was so critical that the couple had to seek the help of a personal physician of Cardinal Michelangelo Rodino. To the problems of the child must be added the behavior of Clelia's husband, who was often absent and not at all willing to review the libertine life to which he had always been accustomed. Concern for the "desordini continoi" of Giovan Giorgio constantly emerges in the letters to the Cardinal, sent by the people who most watched over the couple, in particular Ascanio Celsi and Aurelio Coperchio. Her husband's conduct caused in Clelia much displeasure which gradually increased, with a circle of repeated quarrels followed as many reconciliations.

That the quarrels were frequent is evident from the tone of the correspondence, aimed at reassuring the Cardinal the marital cohabitation between the couple, obviously a cause for concern, nor should it be surprising, given Clelia's rebellious and not at all meek character. As for the reasons, the letter from Bishop Ascanio Cesarini (a relative of the husband) already cited, in which the "desordini continoi" complained, certainly turns out to be interesting. The letter also said that it was necessary to "reform and clean up the house and the women" — this passage allows to imagine a "very intimate" relationships between Giovan Giorgio and the numerous female servants from the Cesarini household. The Marquis of Civitanova also contracted several gambling debts and was linked to disreputable environments.

The sense of abandonment had repercussions on the health of Clelia, who in the following years went through many moments of depression. Her discontent became evident starting from 1579, when the tones of the letters (among the recipients of them was her famous cousin Alessandro Farnese) left more and more room for exasperation. On 8 July of that year, the Avvisi reported this news:

"The rumor published in Rome that Lady Clelia Farnese has, out of jealousy of Lord Giovan Giorgio her husband, killed or beaten to death the Bella Barbara [presumably a courtesan] was not only unfounded but completely false".

Despite the denial, for such a rumor to be published it had to belong to that category of "information which, however fragmentary, was in the public domain". Probably, therefore, that the rumor corresponds to the truth, even if to what extent it is impossible to say today.

=== First widowhood ===
Already on her first visit to Rome in 1570, Clelia was recognized by the local society as the first beauty. Cardinal Farnese was proud of his daughter's beauty; according to the historian Giacinto Gigli, the Cardinal said that during his life he created three great works: the Palazzo Farnese, the Church of the Gesù and “his daughter Clelia”. The philosopher Michel de Montaigne wrote about Clelia's beauty in his "Travel Journal" (French: Journal du voyage) and the poet Torquato Tasso, who first saw her as a child at the court of the Duke of Urbino, met again Clelia in Rome and dedicated a sonnet to her "Sacred Rhymes" (Italian: Rime sacre). Another poet and playwright Cristoforo Castelletti has dedicated Clelia his comedy "The amorous wrongs" (Italian: I torti amorosi).

Finally, in 1585 Clelia was widowed. After burying her husband, the now Dowager Marchioness of Civitanova began to show great favor to her admirers. Clelia's lover was Cardinal Ferdinando de' Medici, the future Grand Duke of Tuscany; their relationship did not last long but was scandalous. Firstly, according to the unwritten rules of the time, the daughter of one Cardinal could not be the mistress of another Cardinal, and secondly, Cardinal de' Medici was the main rival of Cardinal Farnese, Clelia's father, in the struggle for the Papacy. On the orders of Alexander, Duke of Parma and the new head of the House of Farnese, the Dowager Marchioness should marry again and to leave Rome.

=== Second marriage and regency ===
As the new husband was chosen a member of a prominent family, Marco III Pio di Savoia, Lord of Sassuolo; Clelia was completely against this new marriage. Representatives of other Roman patrician families, such as Vitelli and Caetani, also pursued the Dowager Margravine's hand: with any of them, she would not have to leave the Eternal City; however, Cardinal Farnese, having received permission from Pope Sixtus V for the marriage of his daughter and already signed a marriage contract with the Lord of Sassuolo, which provides Clelia with a rich dowry, placed her under house arrest in the fortress of Ronciglione. After some time, Clelia surrendered, and in November 1587 at the Villa Farnese in Caprarola the wedding ceremony took place.

Clelia had to leave her son and move into the possession of her new husband in Sassuolo. The marriage was completely unhappy: Marco III had a jealous and violent character and, at the same time, neglected his marital duties, which suited his wife quite well. Very soon Clelia got bored. Scandals began between her and her husband, turning into fights. Marco III often left her alone; during his absences, Clelia ruled over the Lordship of Sassuolo. So, on 2 December 1590, she issued a decree according to which all foreigners living in the territory of the fief for less than four years had to leave it within eight days with their families under the threat of public beating, both men and women. In addition, no one was required to provide food, lodging, or service to foreigners of any gender, age or condition, even if they had a family or work relationship with these people, unless the foreigners had a special license to stay in Sassuolo before 1591. The penalty for the violation was established by a fine of 25 gold scudi.

Clelia also introduced harsh penalties for blasphemy. For a crime committed for the first time, the person must be fined with 10 gold scudi. The blasphemer was also chained for an hour to a column outside the Palace of Justice in Sassuolo with a stick in his mouth or with a vice on his tongue. For recidivist blasphemers, the fine was increased to 20 gold scudi with the tip of the tongue pierced. Clelia's decrees encouraged denunciations. It was enough to write the name of the blasphemer on a piece of paper and toss it into a special box in the Church of San Giuseppe for the person to be tortured and punished. Clelia has banned a number of games in the Lordship and set the upper limit of rates at 48 bolognino for the entire game.

In 1594, the couple returned briefly to Rome. In 1595, on duty, Marco III went to the Kingdom of Hungary, and Clelia returned to Sassuolo. Their relationship was so terrible that according to the chronicler Giovanni Battista Spaccini, having fallen ill in Modena in October 1598, the Lord of Sassuolo refused to go home, fearing that instead of medicine, his wife would slip poison on him. On 27 November 1599 in Modena, he was stabbed to death during a fight by assassins sent to him by enemies.

=== Last years ===
Now widow for the second time, Clelia left Sassuolo and moved to Parma and then to Rome, where she settled with her son and his family. In the last years of her life, she preferred solitude to fun. Having survived her son by eight months, she died of "malignant fever" in Rome on 11 September 1613 in the palace where had decided to live, in the street of Santa Maria in Via, which she acquired by the amount of 7,000 scudi.

== Bibliography ==
- Fragnito, Gigliola (2013). Storia di Clelia Farnese. Amori, potere, violenza nella Roma della Controriforma (in Italian). Milan: il Mulino. ISBN 978-8-81-524661-5.
- Rosini, Patrizia (2010). Clelia Farnese. La figlia del gran cardinale (in Italian). Viterbo: Settecittà. ISBN 978-88-7853-172-7.
- Spaccini, Giovanni Battista (1993). Cronaca di Modena anni 1588-1602 (in Italian). Vol. I. Modena: Ranieri Prosperi. ISBN 978-8-87-686250-2.
