= Antonio Brianti =

Italian architect

Antonio Brianti (15 April 1739 – 8 May 1787) was an Italian architect, active mainly in his native Parma.

He was a pupil of the decorative architect Gaetano Ghidetti. His early years were involved in decorative work, but in 1762, he tied with Filippo Castelli for a first prize in architecture award from the Accademia Parmense di Belle Arti. His winning submission was for a model of a rustic casino on a hillside.

He was then rewarded a position for the next decade designing the alterations to the interior of the church of the Steccata, including the monument to Duke Ottavio Farnese. He also helped, with Ghidetti, in the decorations of the nave of the church of San Antonio Abate. He also helped design the decoration (1777) of the chapel of the Beato Giovanni Buralli (1777) in the Piacenza Cathedral. Later he worked on the Parmesan Benedictine Convent of San Giovanni, the church of San Sepolcro, and the facade of the church of San Giuseppe (completed 1782). He died in his home city of Parma, aged 48.

== Sources ==
- Dizionario-Biografico)/| Entry in Treccani Dizionario Biografico degli Italiani - Volume 14 (1972)
