= San Giuseppe, Parma =

Church in Parma, Italy

Coordinates: 44°47′59.61″N 10°19′9.01″E

San Giuseppe is a Baroque church in Parma.

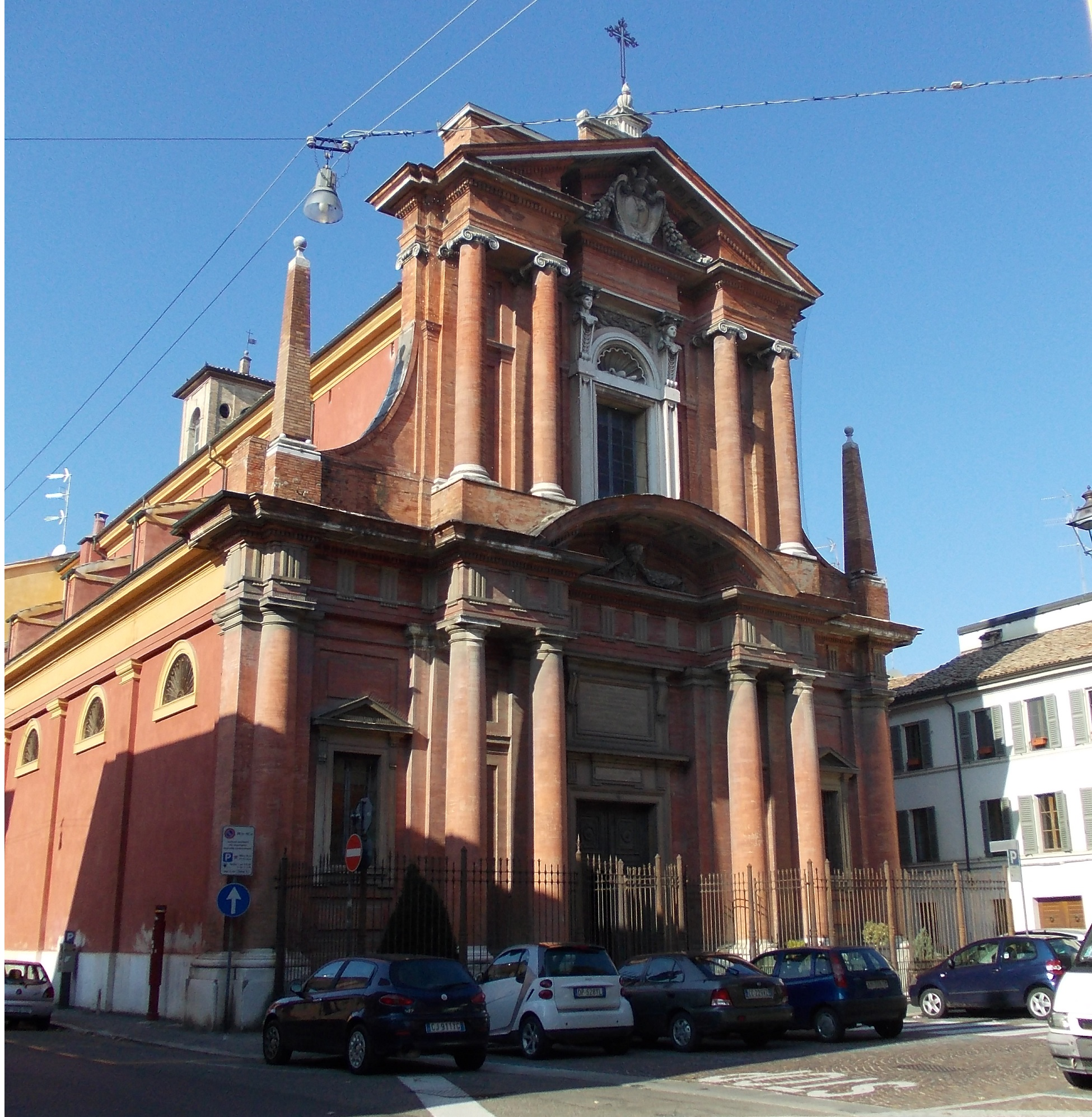
Chiesa di San Giuseppe

The church was built from 1626 to 1666 under the designs of Girolamo Rainaldi. Work was interrupted by the plague affecting the city. The façade was completed in 1782 from a design by Antonio Brianti.

The interior has canvases featuring St Cecilia by Paolo Ferrari and John the Baptist and S. Francesco di Sales by Giuseppe Peroni, paintings acquired after the suppression of the parochial church of Santa Cecilia.
