= Portrait of a Man in a Red Beret =

Painting attributed to Parmigianino

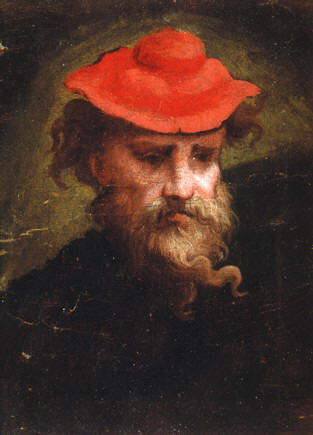
Portrait of a Man in a Red Beret (c. 1540), attributed to Parmigianino

Portrait of a Man in a Red Beret or Self-Portrait in a Red Beret is an oil on paper painting attributed to Parmigianino or Michelangelo Anselmi, executed c. 1540. It is held in the collection of the National Gallery of Parma.

In 1968 the painting was exhibited in the Tesori nascosti della Galleria di Parma exhibition, for which it was detached from its canvas mount, revealing a studies for a Saint Catherine and a Madonna and Child on the reverse.

The art historian Ghidiglia Quintavalle theorised that the work was a late Parmigianino self-portrait, identifying it with "a coloured painting finished di lapis showing a self-portrait of the Parmesanino, 0.5 high by 4 tall", a work mentioned in a posthumous inventory of his studio. However, this identification remains in doubt, since the Parma work does not have Parmigianino's usual lead graphite "di lapis" finish.

The work has been compared to the description of the artist's appearance in old age in Vasari's Lives of the Artists as "delicate and gentle, with long and battered beard and hair, almost a saviour, different from what had been". Its attribution to Parmigianino is almost unanimous among art historians and is upheld by Fagiolo dell'Arco (1970), Rossi (1980), Freedberg (1987), Di Giampaolo (1991), Gould (1994), Coliva (1998) and Chiusa (2001). Only Cirillo and Godi (1982) dissented, attributing it instead to Anselmi, with Cirillo switching it to the Parmigianino attribution in 1999.

Although it has been exhibited as Self-Portrait of Parmiganino, the attribution to Anselmi has recently been re-advanced due to stylistic details such as the ruffled hair, the soft serpentine beard and the study of the saint on the reverse, which may correspond with Anselmi's Saint Jerome and Saint Catherine (Pinacoteca di Brera).

== Bibliography ==
- (in Italian) Pierluigi Leone de Castris, Parmigianino e il manierismo europeo [exhibition catalogue, Parma, Galleria Nazionale, 8 febbraio - 15 maggio 2003, Vienna, Kunsthistorisches Museum, 4 June - 14 September 2003], Cinisello Balsamo, Silvana editoriale, 2003, 431 p. (ISBN 978-88-8215-481-3), p. 236–237
- (in Italian) Luisa Viola, Parmigianino, Parme, Grafiche Step editrice, 2007.
- (in Italian) Mario Di Giampaolo and Elisabetta Fadda, Parmigianino, Keybook-lieu=Sant'Arcangelo di Romagna, 2002 (ISBN 978-88-18-02236-0)
