= Oratorio di Sant'Ilario, Parma =

Building in Parma, Italy

Coordinates: 44.80334°N 10.31909°E

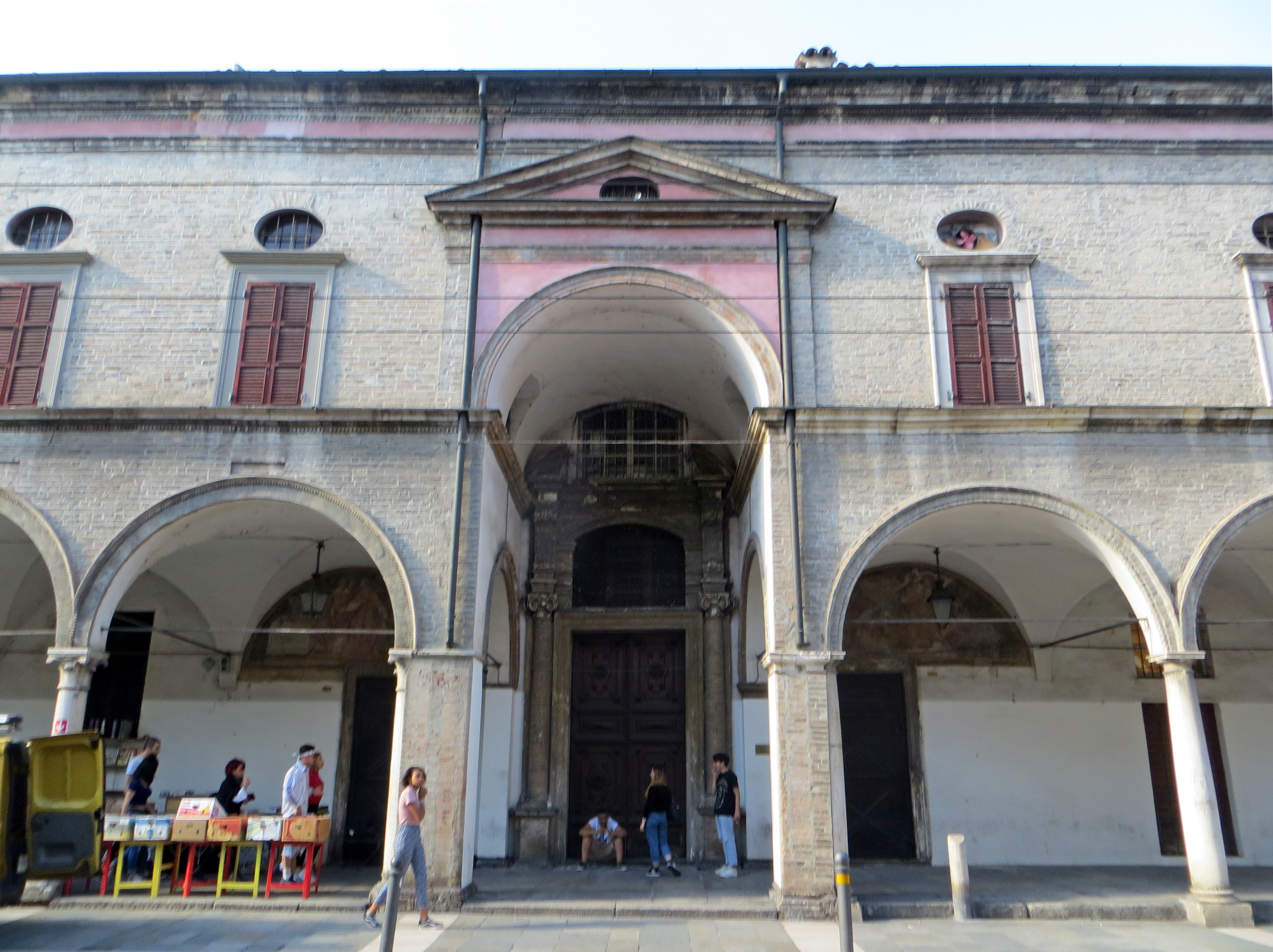

The Oratorio di Sant'Ilrico (Oratory of Saint Hilarius) is a Baroque style, former-Roman Catholic oratory, that can be also described as a small church or independent-standing chapel, located at strada Massimo d'Azeglio #43, in the Oltretorrente quarter of Parma, Italy. The oratory is dedicated to the 4th-century anti-Arian Saint Hilary of Poitiers, one of the patrons of the city. The oratory is located within the Ospedale Vecchio (old civic hospital) with the entrance sandwiched among the porticoes of facing the strada. This hospital was initially founded in the 13th century by Rodolfo Tanzi.

== History ==
A church, located outside the medieval walls near Porta Croce on the road to Piacenza, dedicated to Sant'Ilario was dedicated in the 13th century after Charles I of Anjou helped the local defeat the Ghibelline forces in town. Razed in 1546 by Pier Luigi Farnese as he expanded the walls. The oratory was moved to a hospital here, dedicated to aiding the poor and infant orphans (Ospedale della Misericordia e delle Esposti). The Baroque interiors were completed by 1663 under the patronage of Francesco Roncalea. The vault of the same was painted by Giovanni Maria Conti della Camera aided by Francesco Reti and Antonio Lombardi Parmigiani between 1664 and 1666. The stucco work was completed by Domenico Reti. To the left of the main altar was incorporated the monument of the founder of the Ospedale della Misericordia, Rodolfo Tanzi.
