= San Marcellino, Parma =

Church building in Parma, Italy

Former church of San Marcellino
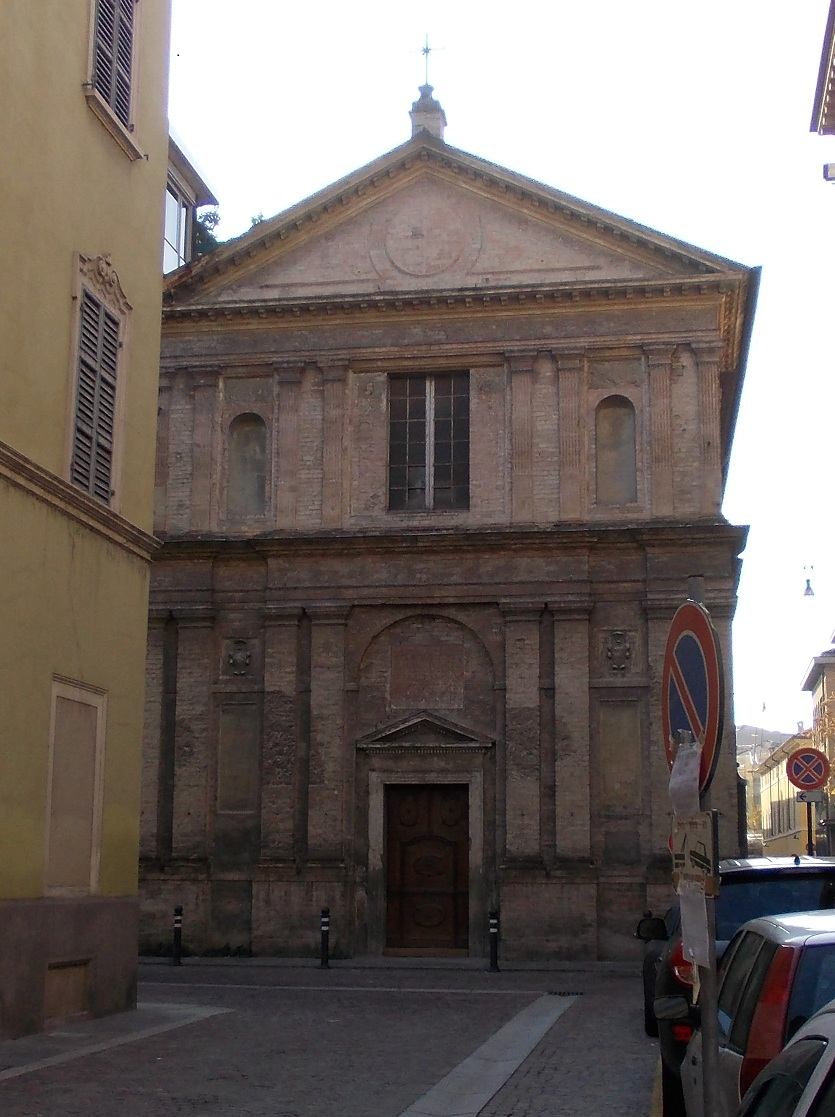
- The facade of the former church of San Marcellino, Parma

Religion
- Affiliation: Roman Catholic (deconsecrated)
- Province: Parma

Location
- Location: Parma, Emilia-Romagna, Italy
- Interactive map of Former church of San Marcellino

Architecture
- Type: Church
- Style: Renaissance

San Marcellino is a Renaissance-style, once Roman Catholic but now deconsecrated church located on Strada del Collegio dei Nobili in Parma, region of Emilia-Romagna, Italy.

== History ==
This parish church is first documented in 1074. It was rebuilt and then reconsecrated on 1543. The construction was led by the rector Gabrielle Lalatta, but the architectural designs are attributed to Giorgio da Erba (or perhaps Antonio da Sangallo il Giovane). In 1560, Pope Pius IV converted this into an abbey church. The parish was suppressed in 1928, and the church deconsecrated. The interior layout, with a single nave, was attributed to Giulio Romano. It once held a main altarpiece depicting the Madonna and Child with Saints Marcellinus and Jerome by Girolamo Bedoli.
