= Vision of St. John on Patmos =

Series of frescoes by Antonio da Correggio

Vision of St. John the Evangelist
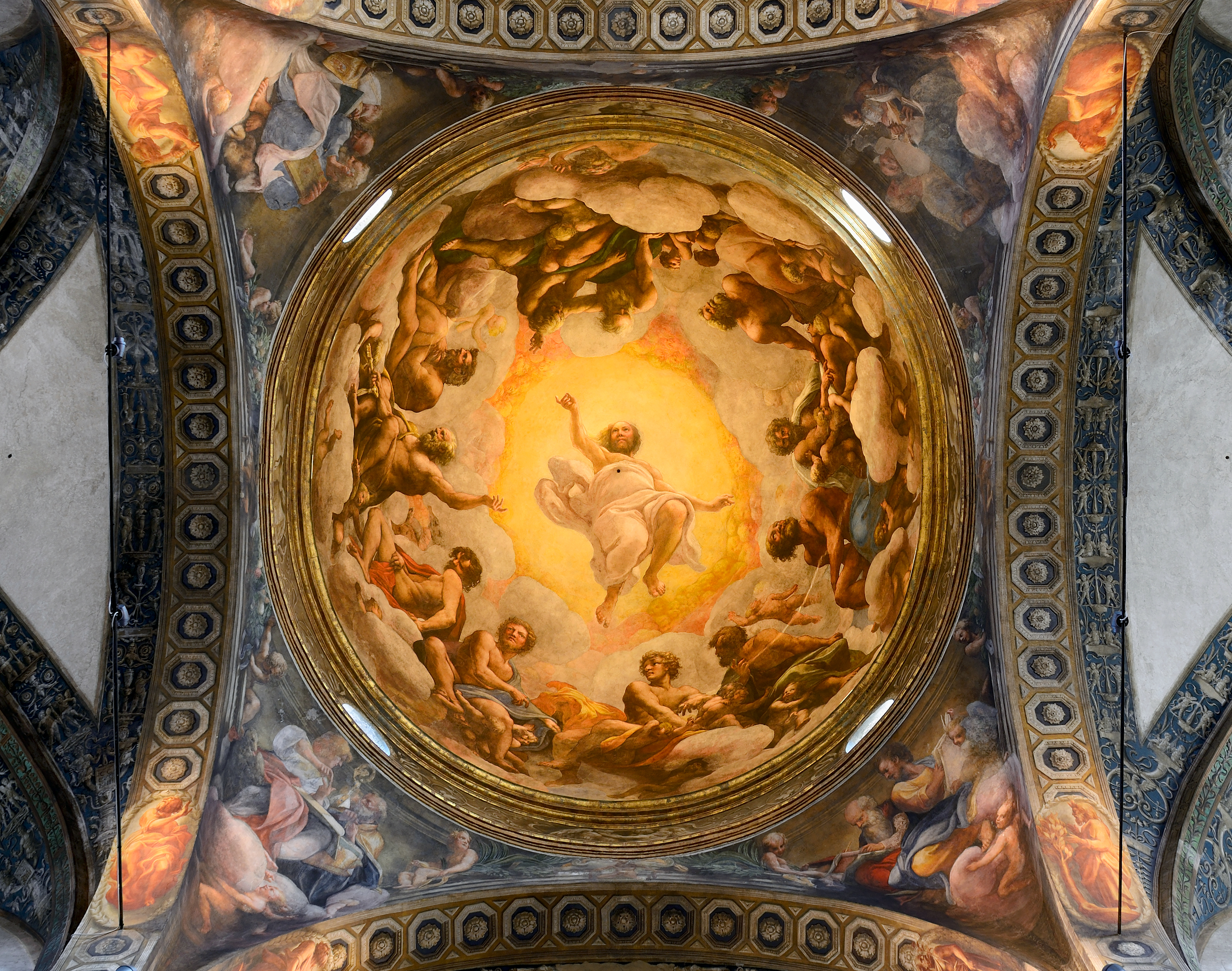
- Artist: Antonio da Correggio
- Year: 1520–1522
- Type: Fresco
- Dimensions: 969 cm × 889 cm (381 in × 350 in)
- Location: San Giovanni Evangelista, Parma

The Vision of St. John the Evangelist at Patmos (1520–1522) is a series of frescoes by the Italian late Renaissance artist Antonio Allegri da Correggio. It occupies the interior of the dome and the relative pendentives of the Benedictine church of San Giovanni Evangelista of Parma, Italy.

The centre of the cupola is occupied by an illusionistic space based on series of concentric planes indicated by the clouds, from which the apostles stretch out. Starting from the border of the dome, the clouds thin out and open to a bright luminosity through which Christ is descending toward the floor of the nave. The scene is a faithful rendering of John's Book of Revelation (I,7). The figure of St. John leans from the drum of the dome and this part of the fresco was hidden to the lay people present in the church, but was visible to the monks in the choir and under the dome.

In the four pendentives Correggio painted and coupled the Four Evangelists and the Four Doctors of the Church. These are:

- St. Matthew with an angel
- St. Mark with a winged lion
- St. Luke with an ox
- St. John with an eagle

and, respectively,

- St. Jerome with the white beard and red garments
- St. Ambrose with a staff
- St. Gregory with the Papal tiara
- St. Augustine portrayed counting together with St. John

== Gallery ==
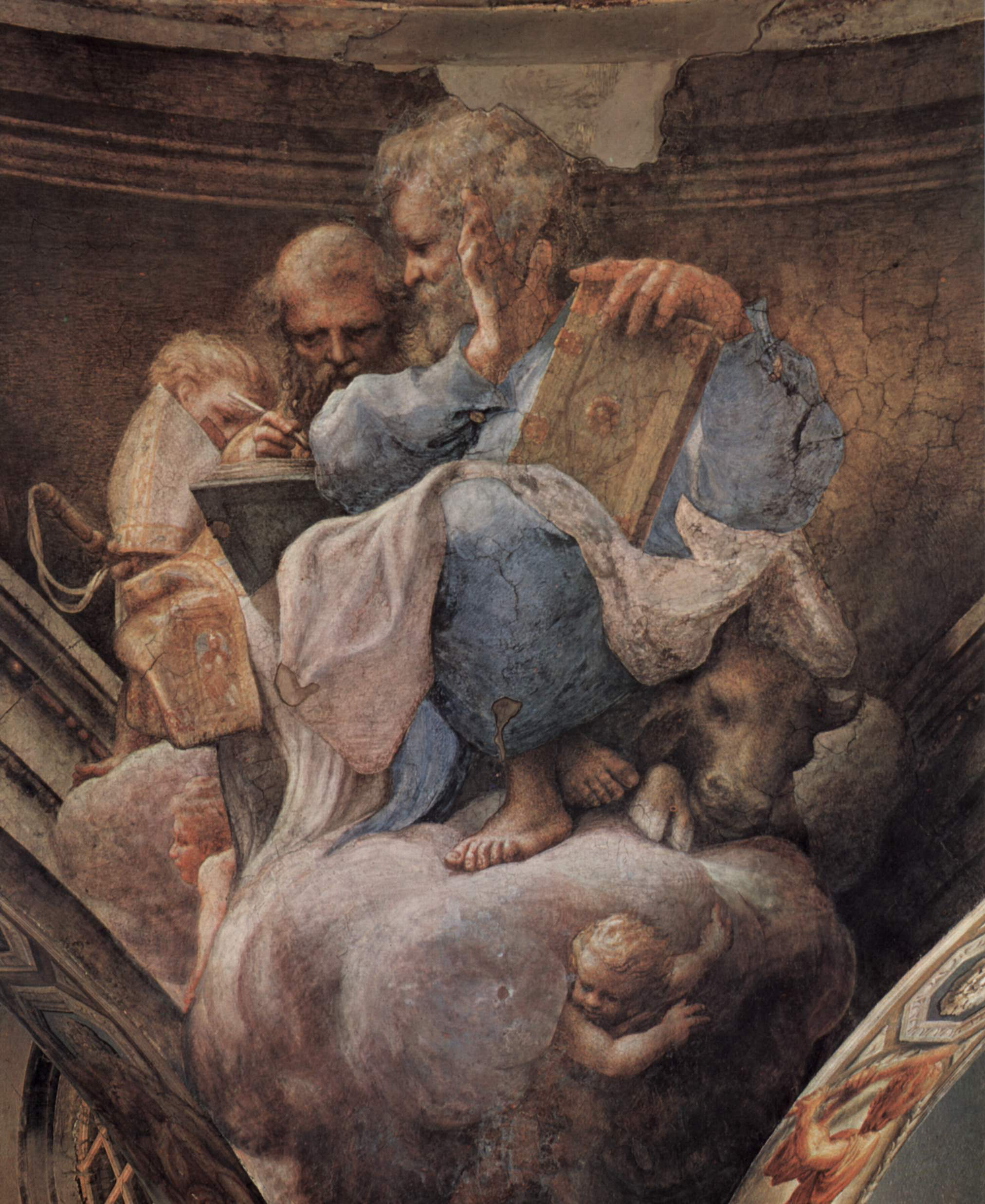
St. Luke and St. Gregory

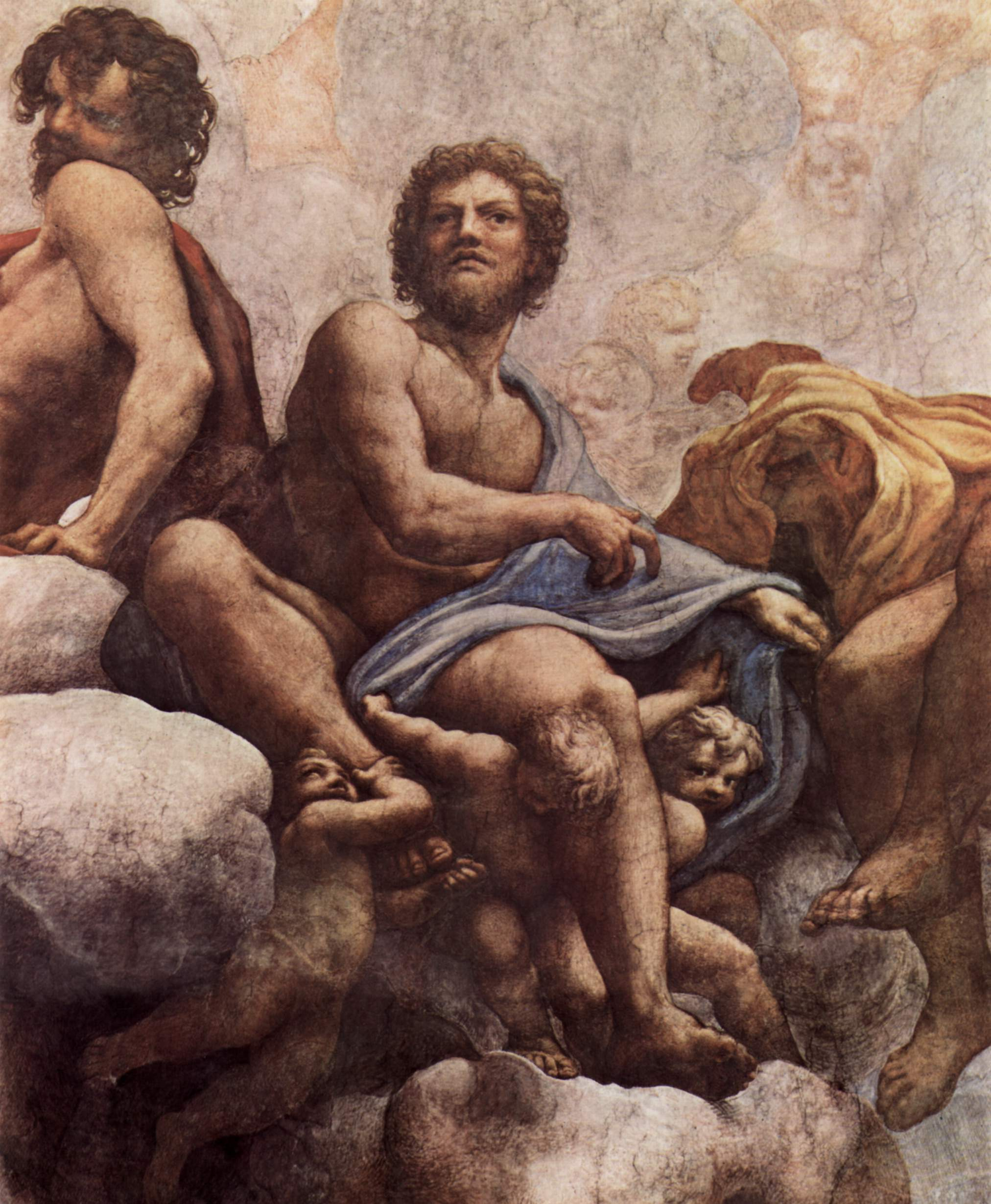
St. Philip and St. Taddaeus

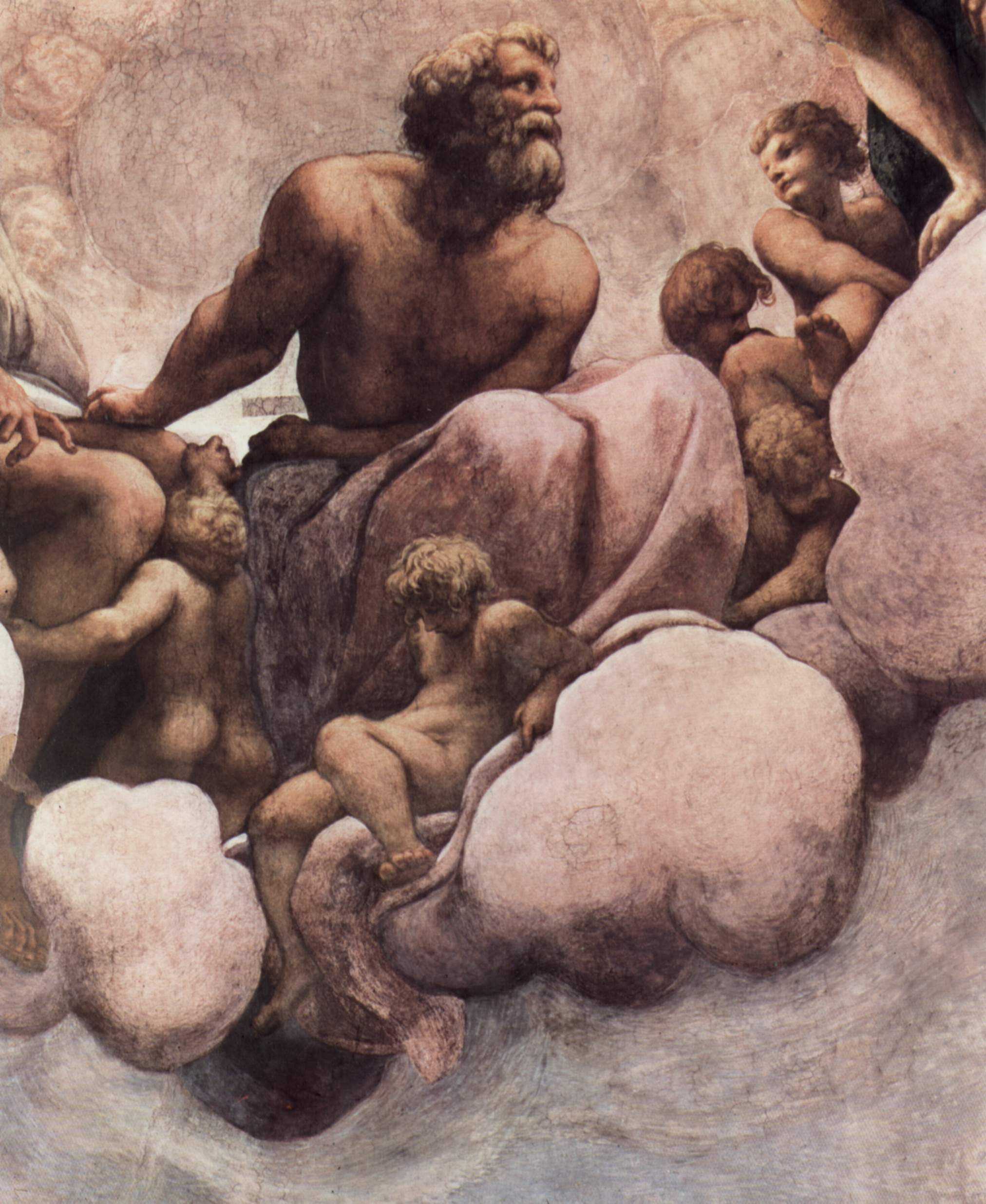
St. Simon

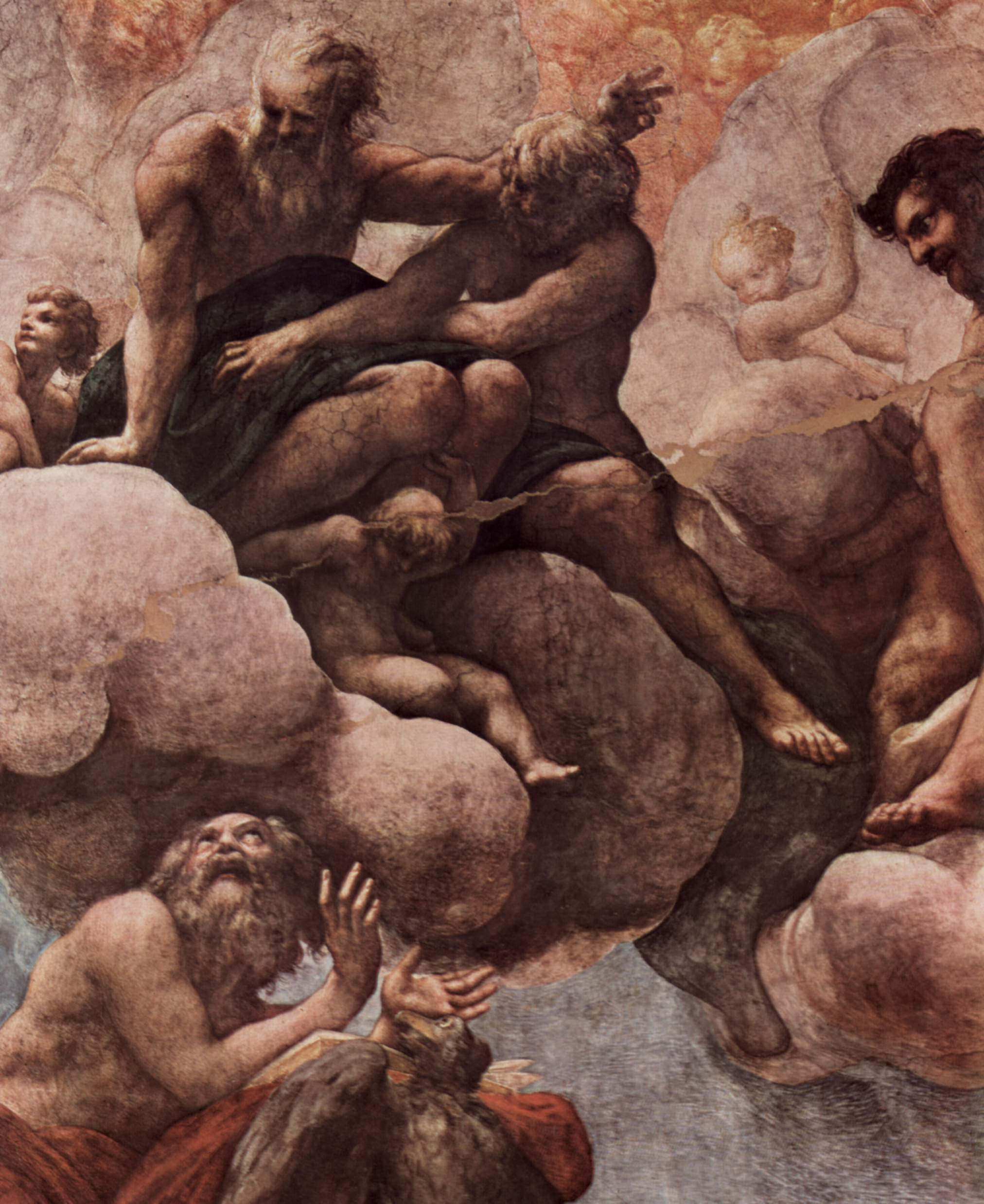
St. Bartholomew and St. Matthias

== See also ==
- Assumption of the Virgin (Correggio)
