= Artemio Motta =

Italian composer

Artemio Motta (c. 1661 - 18th century) was an Italian composer of the Baroque period.

Artemio Motta was a Catholic priest, born in Parma into a wealthy family. His musical output consists of 10 Concerti a cinque, Op.1 (published Modena: Fortuniano Rosati, 1701 and again Amsterdam: Estienne Roger, 1702) and a collection of Cantatas ''Cantate a voce sola'', Op.2, (published Bologna: Marino Silvani, 1704). There are also a small number of works which survive in manuscript form. Motta's Concerti conform stylistically to those of Giuseppe Torelli. They are typical for the time in that they contain two parts for the viola.

== Discography ==
- 10 Concerti à 5 performed by Ars Antiqua Austria directed by Gunar Letzbor, 2010 Challenge Classics CC 72336

This recording was published as works of Sigr. Mouthon (presumably the French lutenist Charles Mouton), whose name was found on a handwritten copy of the work which was used as the basis for the recording.
