= Santa Croce, Parma =

Romanesque church in Parma, Italy

Coordinates: 44°48′14.28″N 10°18′54.46″E

Church of Holy Cross; Chiesa di Santa Croce (Italian)
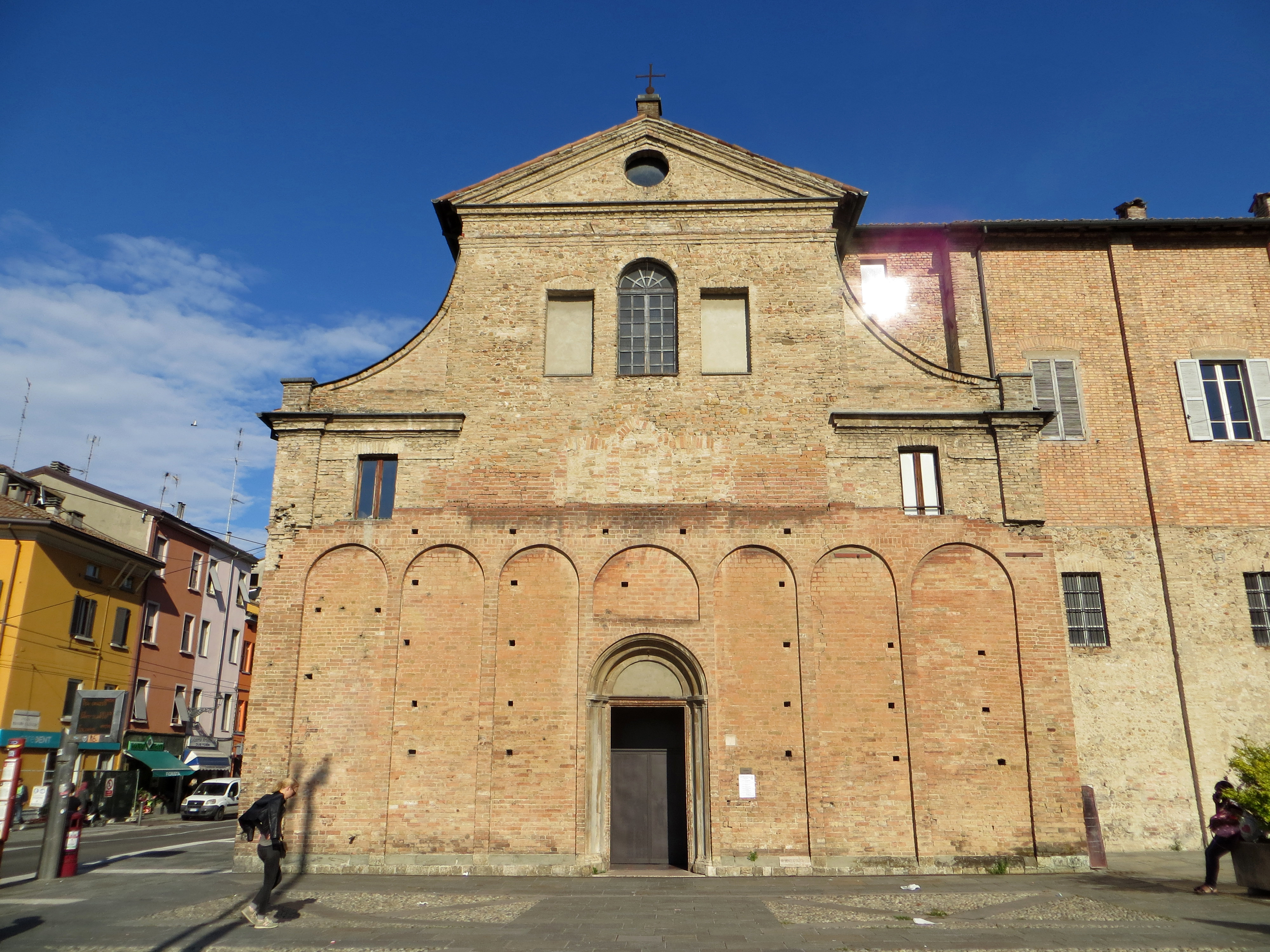
- Santa Croce

Religion
- Affiliation: Catholic

Location
- Location: Parma, Italy
- Interactive map of: Church of Holy Cross; Chiesa di Santa Croce (Italian)

Architecture
- Style: Romanesque
- Groundbreaking: 1222

Santa Croce is a Romanesque-style, Roman Catholic church, located on the piazza of the same name, along via Emilia in the quartiere of Oltretorrente of Parma, Region of Emilia-Romagna, Italy.

== History ==
First consecrated in 1222, the structure has undergone many modifications that obscure much of the original Romanesque structure. The main changes from 1635-1666 were commissioned by confraternity of St Joseph, and elevated the nave, and constructed a presbytery, dome, and chapel dedicated to the named saint. The nave ceiling is frescoed with episodes of the Infancy of Jesus and the Life of St. Joseph, painted by Giovanni Maria Conti, called della Camera, and his assistants Francesco Reti and Antonio Lombardi. The altar has wooden polychrome statues of the Holy Family carved by Angelo Fontana and of the saints Apollonia and Lucia, by Giovanni Battista Merano. In the 1900s, architect Edoardo Collamarini worked to revert the facade of the church to its original Romanesque style.
