= Pendentive =

Architectural element for supporting a dome atop square walls

Schematic representation of a dome on pendentives.

A pendentive is a constructional device permitting the placing of a circular dome over a square room or of an elliptical dome over a rectangular room. The pendentives, which are triangular segments of a sphere, taper to points at the bottom and spread at the top to establish the continuous circular or elliptical base needed for a dome. In masonry the pendentives thus receive the weight of the dome, concentrating it at the four corners where it can be received by the piers beneath.

Prior to the pendentive's development, builders used the device of corbelling or squinches in the corners of a room. Pendentives commonly occurred in Orthodox, Renaissance, and Baroque churches, with a drum with windows often inserted between the pendentives and the dome. The first experimentation with pendentives began with Roman dome construction in the 2nd–3rd century AD, while full development of the architectural form came in the 6th-century Eastern Roman cathedral, Hagia Sophia, in Constantinople (Istanbul).

== Gallery ==
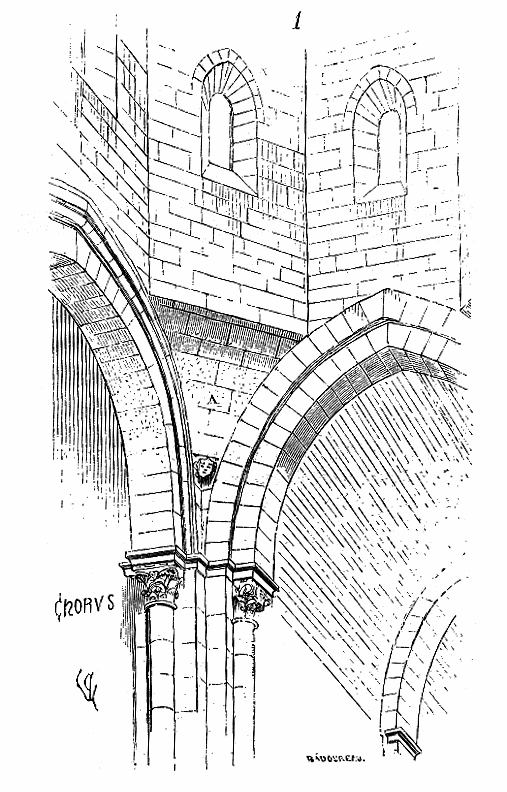
A pendentive, labelled A. Illustration of a church in Nantua

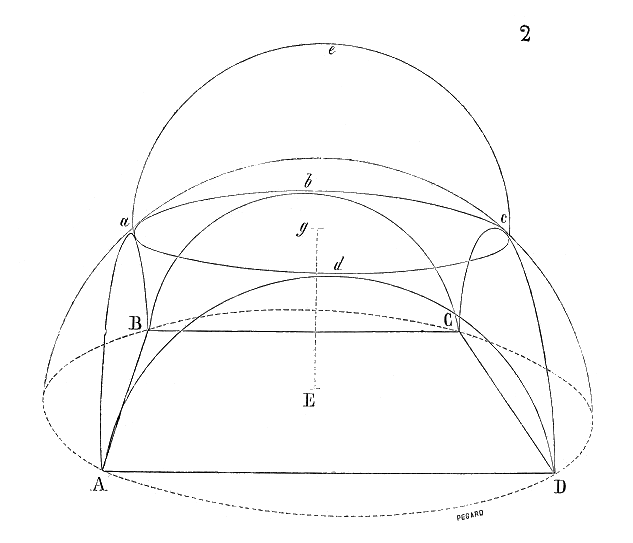
Formation of a pendentive by Eugène Viollet-le-Duc, 1856

Pendentive structure

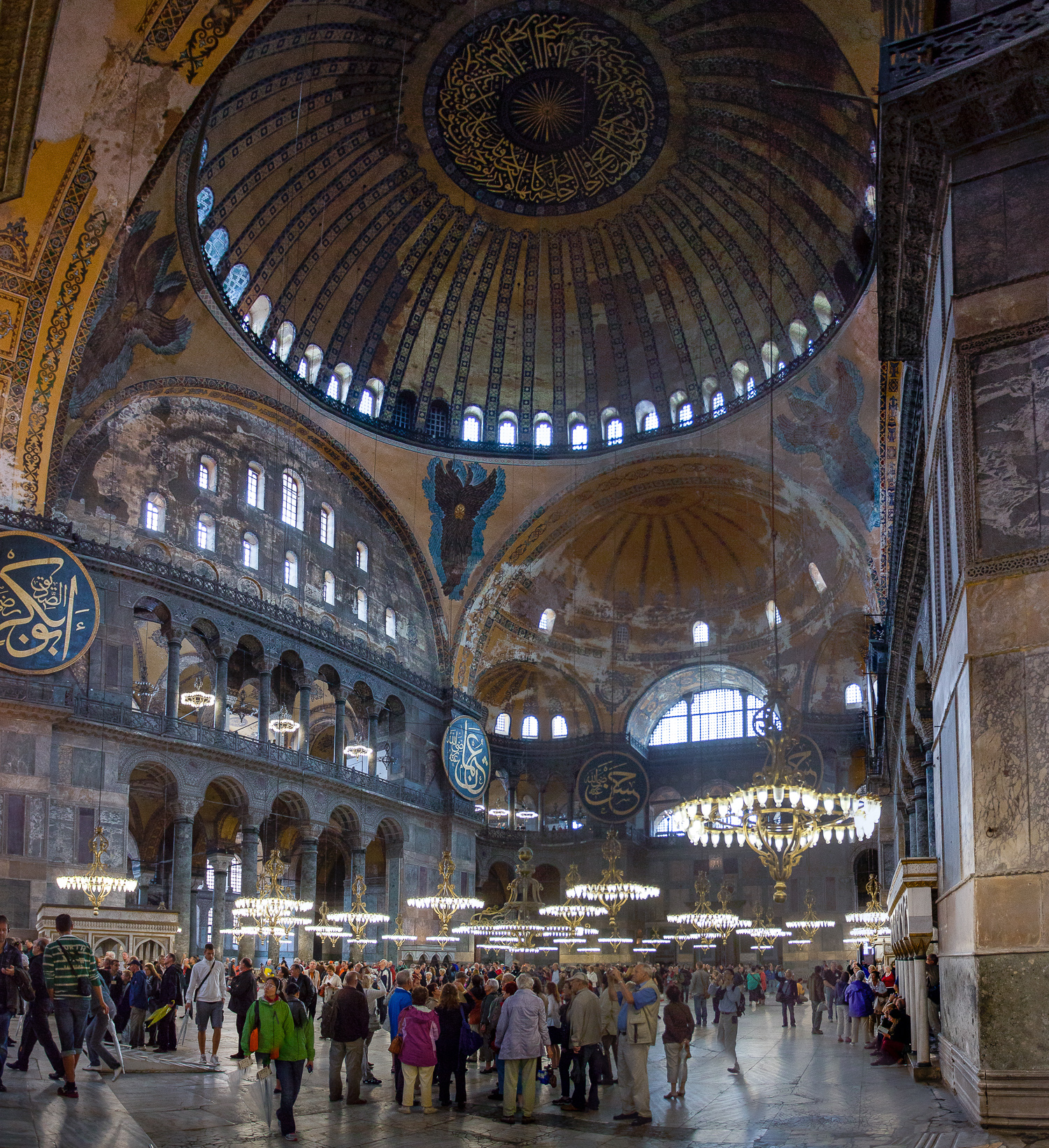
Dome of the Hagia Sophia, Constantinople/Istanbul

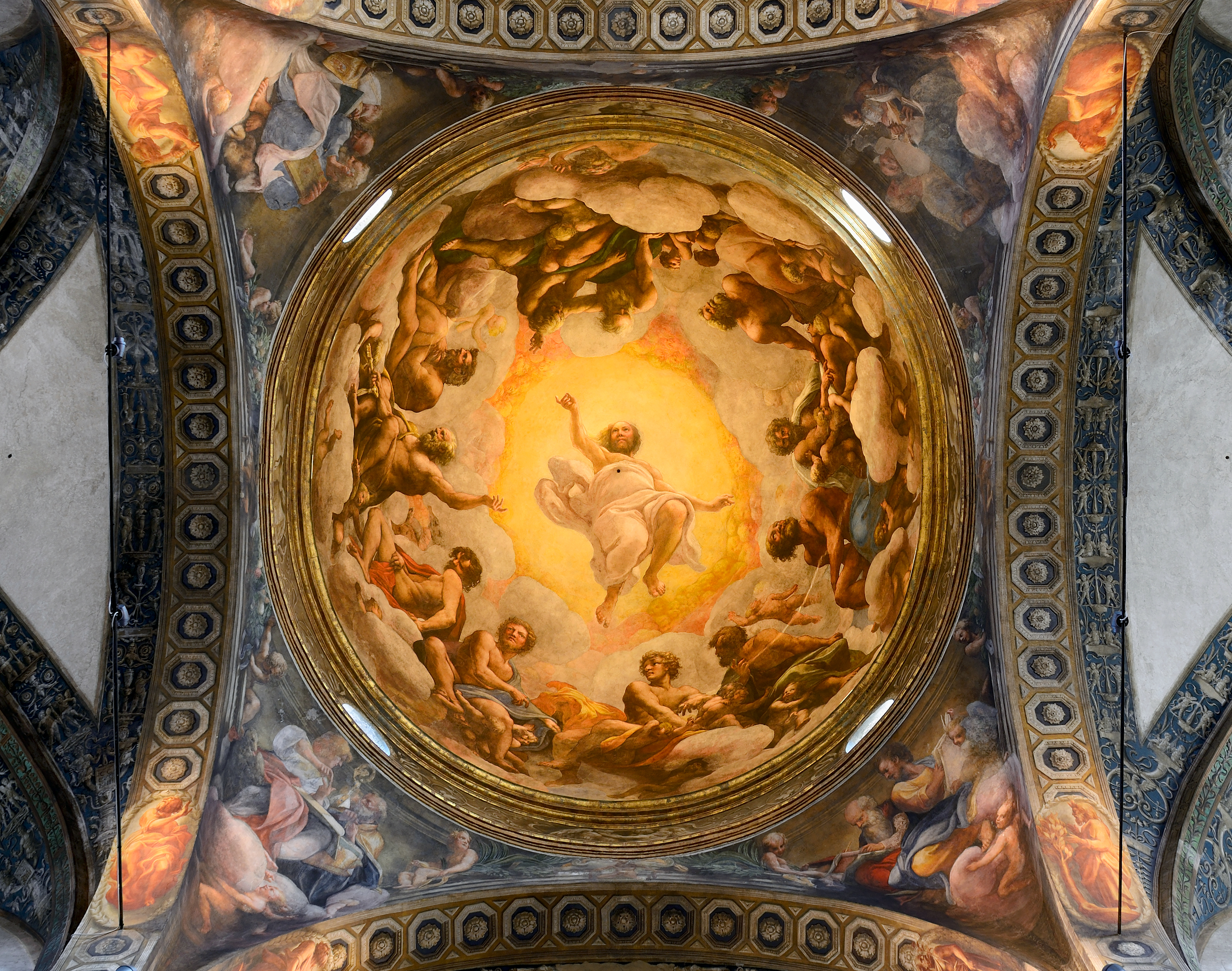
Vision of St. John on Patmos by Correggio (1520–1522), San Giovanni Evangelista, Parma

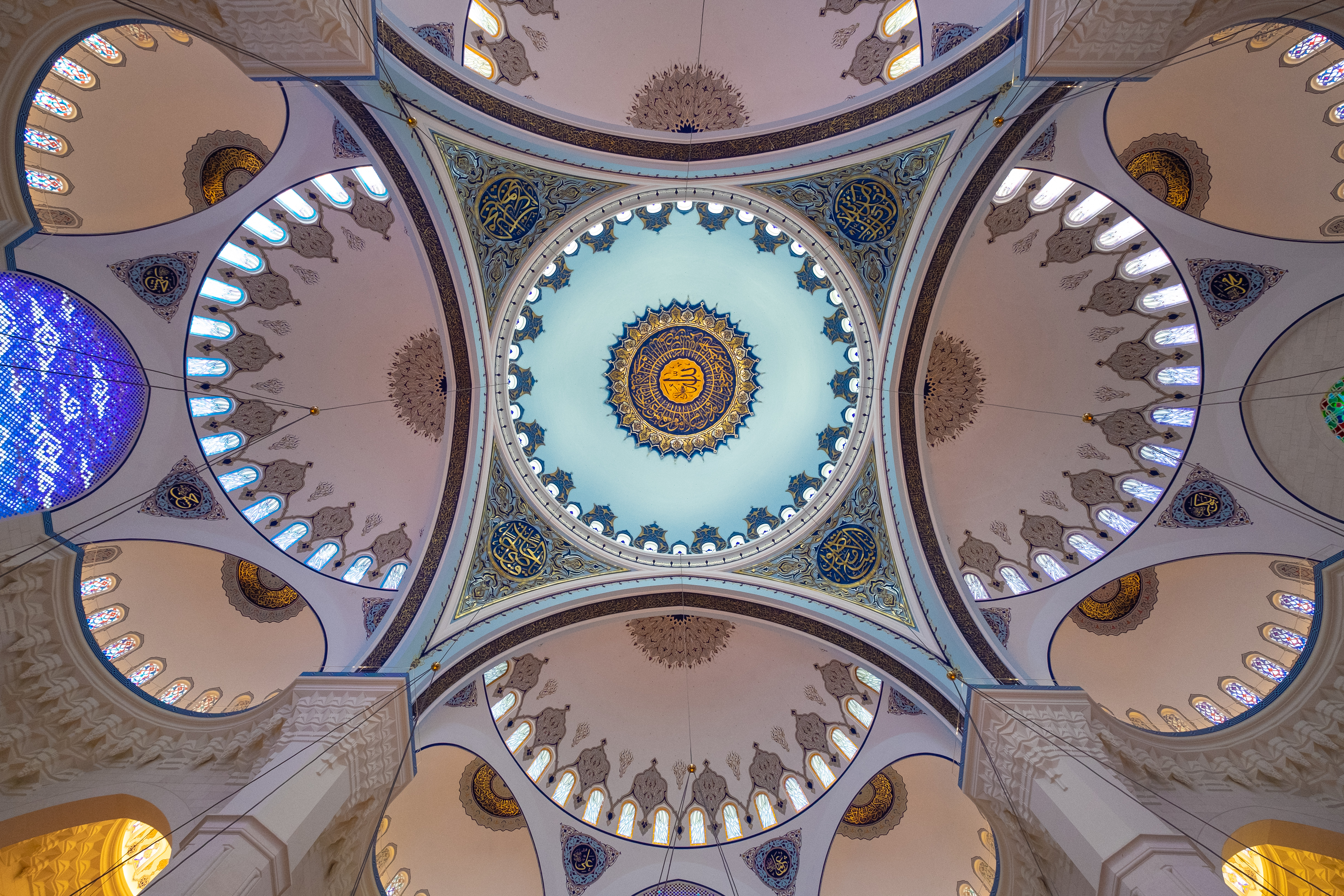
The attributes of Allah (God) in intrinsic Islamic calligraphy on the pendentives of Çamlıca Mosque, Istanbul, opened in 2019

== See also ==
- Italian Renaissance domes
- Spandrel – Space between a curved figure and a rectangular boundary

== Sources ==
- Heinle, Erwin; Schlaich, Jörg (1996), Kuppeln aller Zeiten, aller Kulturen, Stuttgart, ISBN 3-421-03062-6
- Rasch, Jürgen (1985), "Die Kuppel in der römischen Architektur. Entwicklung, Formgebung, Konstruktion", Architectura, vol. 15, pp. 117–139
