= Giovanni Maria Conti =

Italian painter

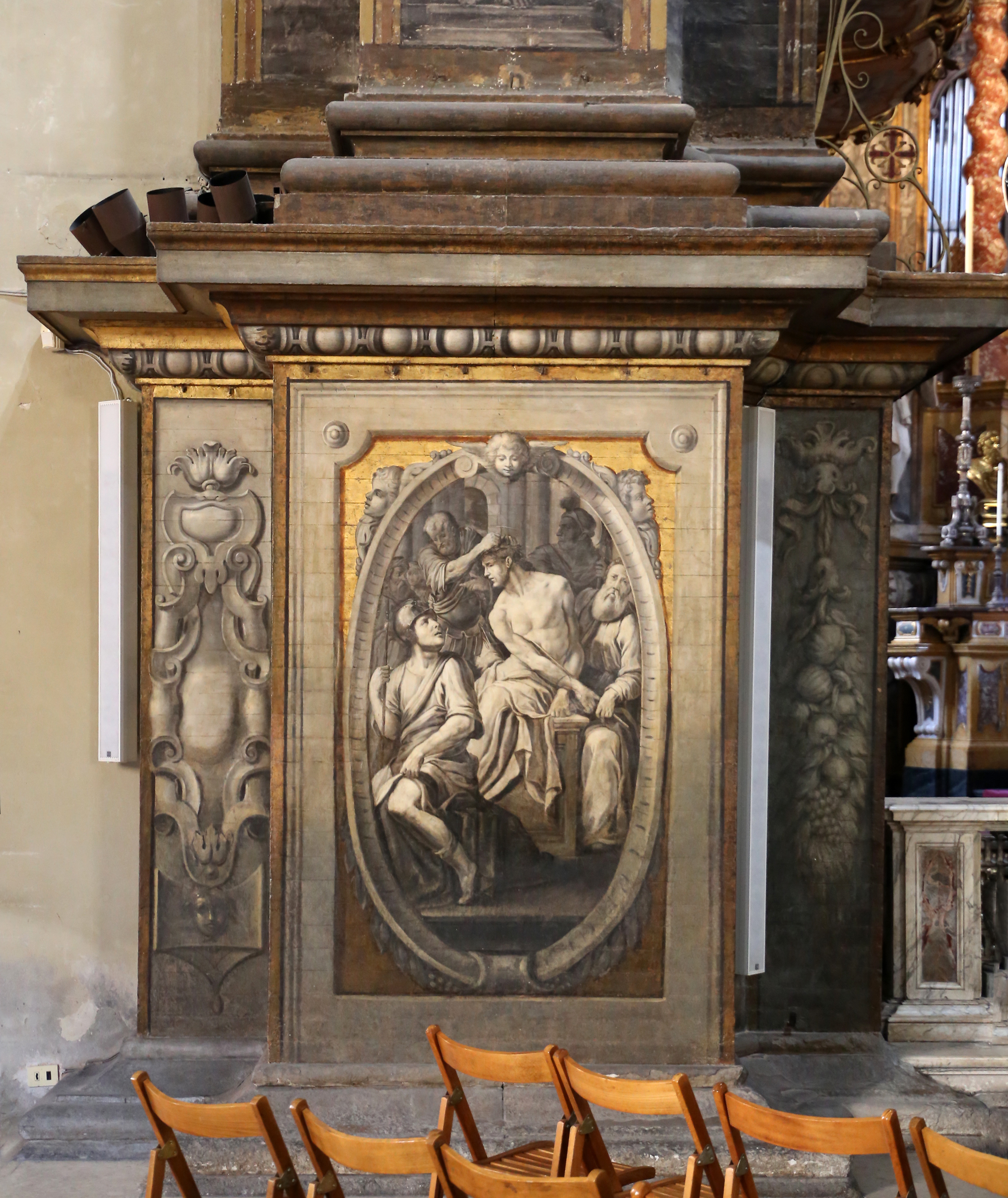
Paintings in the Steccata basilica of Parma

Giovanni Maria Conti, also called Giovanni dalla Camera (active 1617–1670) was an Italian painter active during the Baroque period in Parma.

== Biography ==
He painted the monochrome decoration on the pilasters of the Sanctuary of the Steccata; worked in the church of the Cappuccine; Santa Maria del Quartiere; and Santa Croce. In the latter church, his fresco work was aided by Francesco Reti and Antonio Lombardi. He painted for the church of Sant'Alessandro and the Oratory of Sant'Ilario.
