= Giovanni Maria Francesco Rondani =

Italian painter (1490–1550)

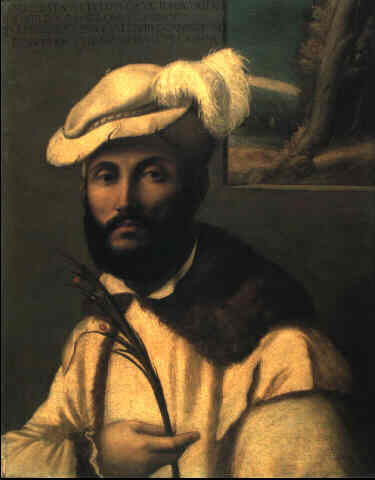
Portrait of bearded man with feathered hat by Giovanni Maria Francesco Rondani; private collection

Giovanni Maria Francesco Rondani (15 July 1490 – September 1550) was an Italian painter, active in a Renaissance style in Parma.

== Biography ==
He was a near contemporary of Michelangelo Anselmi, and is known to have worked on designs of Antonio da Correggio for the frescoes (1522) in the Cappella del Bono of the church of San Giovanni Evangelista in Parma. Rondani also worked with Anselmi in the Oratorio della Concezione of the church. He also painted scenes of Christ's Passion and of the Life of St Anthony Abbot in Capella Centoni in Parma.

== Partial Anthology ==
- Madonna in Glory with Saint Gregory and Saint Sebastian, (Pinacoteca, Parma)
- Assunta, (Museo di Capodimonte, Naples)
