= Santa Caterina d'Alessandria, Parma =

Church building in Parma, Italy

Coordinates: 44°47′57.39″N 10°19′17.82″E

Santa Caterina d'Alessandria ('Saint Catherine of Alexandria') is a Roman Catholic church located in the borgo Santa Caterina of the city of Parma, Italy

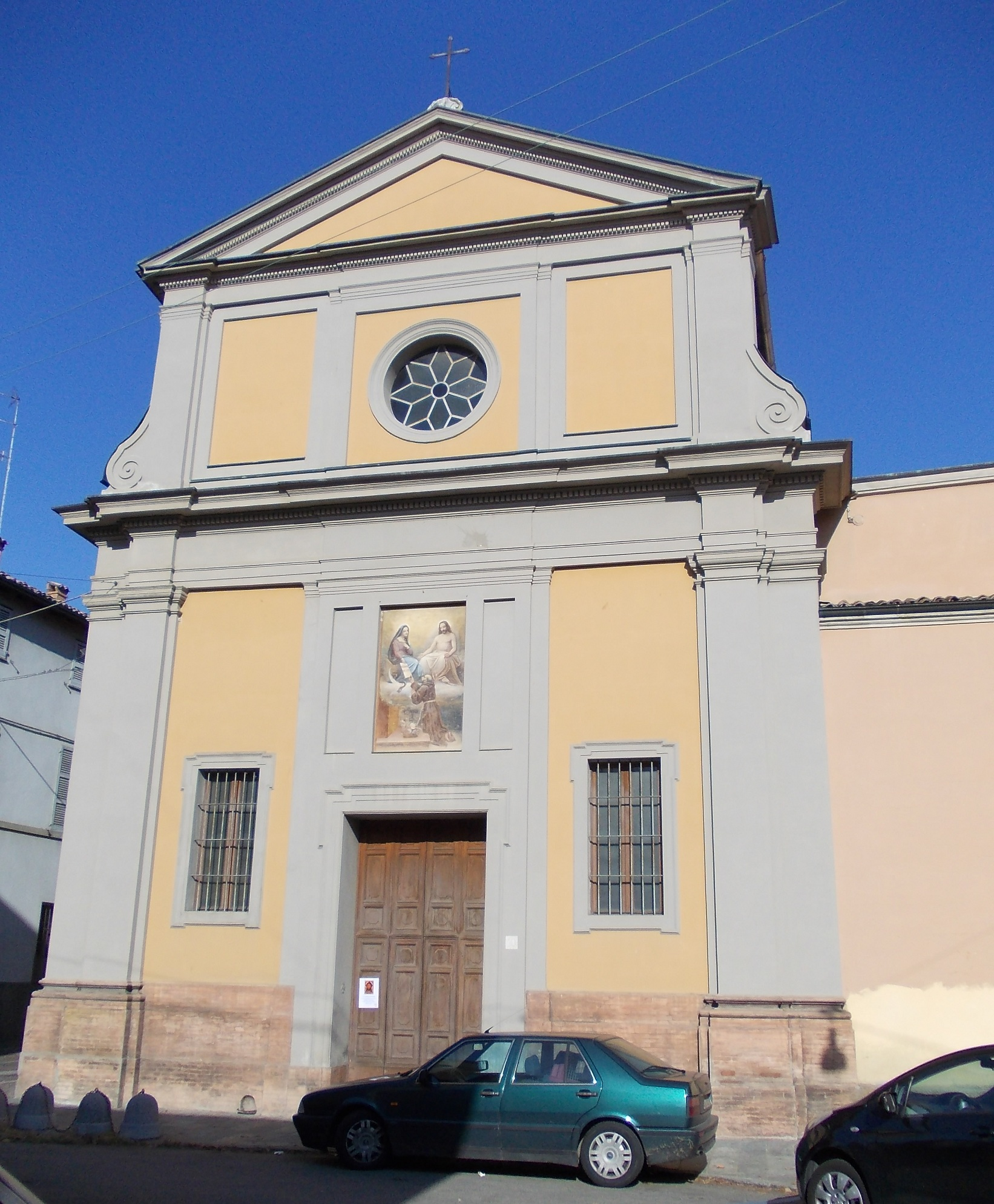
Santa Caterina façade

== History ==
The church, with the adjacent Augustinian Monastery is first mentioned in documents from 1313. The cult of St Catherine was boosted in 1332, when her intercession was credited with the victory of Charles IV, Holy Roman Emperor over the attacking armies of the Scaligeri and Gonzaga. In 1575, the monastery was passed on the capuchin monks, and so stayed till the 1810 suppression by Napoleon. In the late 1800s, the properties were re-acquired by the monks, but they have again ceded them to the bishop.

The interior has a St Francis receiving stigmata attributed to Guercino, a Deposition by Biagio Martini, a Martyrdom of San Fedele da Sigmaringen by Clemente Ruta, a San Felice da Cantalice by Fra Semplice da Verona.
