= Enzo Magnanini =

Italian footballer (1935-1968)

Personal information
- Full name: Enzo Magnanini
- Date of birth: 7 May 1935
- Place of birth: San Lazzaro Parmense, Parma, Italy
- Date of death: 4 March 1968 (aged 32)
- Place of death: Castelfranco Emilia, Italy
- Height: 1.76 m (5 ft 9 1/2 in)
- Position: Goalkeeper

Senior career*
Years	Team	Apps	(Gls)
1954–1957	Parma	36	(0)
1957–1962	Bari	85	(0)
1962–1964	Venezia	36	(0)
1964–1966	Parma	36	(2)
1966–1967	Carrarese	33	(0)
1967–1968	Perugia	4	(0)
Total		230	(2)
- * Club domestic league appearances and goals

Enzo Magnanini (7 May 1935 – 4 March 1968) was an Italian football goalkeeper who played in Serie A with A.S. Bari and F.B.C. Unione Venezia.

== Career ==
Born in San Lazzaro Parmense, Parma, Magnanini began playing professional football with local Serie B side Parma F.C. in 1954. He joined rivals A.S. Bari in 1957. Magnanini enjoyed the best spell of his career with Bari as he became the starting goalkeeper following promotion to Serie A. Later, he returned to Serie A with Venezia and had a second stint with Parma. In 1966, he joined Carrarese Calcio for one season. His last season was with A.C. Perugia Calcio.

On 16 December 1968, Magnanini was returning from Perugia's match in Potenza when he died in an auto accident at age 32.
