= San Sepolcro, Parma =

Church in Parma, Italy

Coordinates: 44°48′0.27″N 10°20′9.25″E

Church of the Holy Sepulchre; Chiesa di San Sepolcro (Italian)
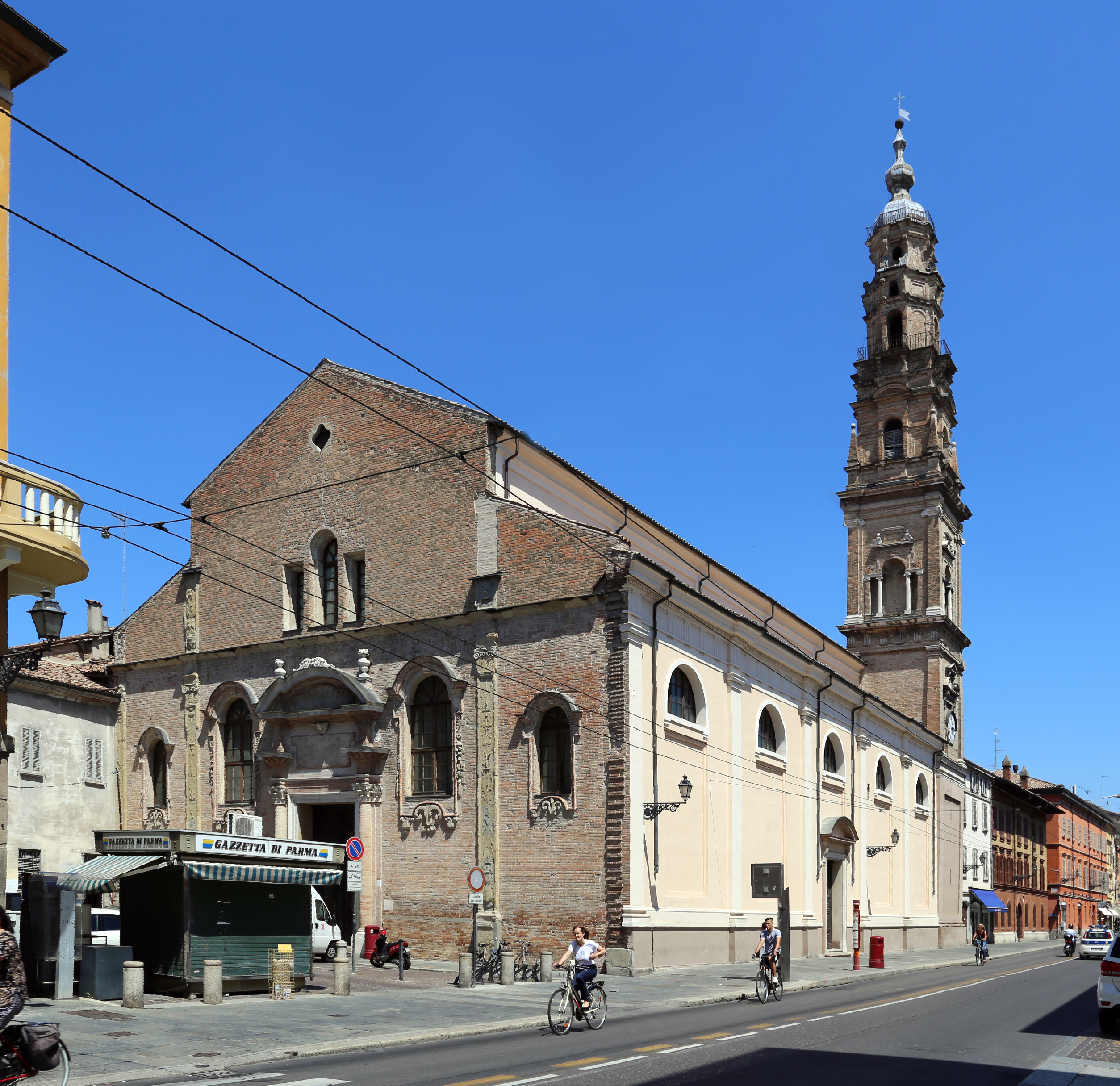

Religion
- Affiliation: Catholic

Location
- Location: Strada della Repubblica #76, Parma, Italy
- Interactive map of: Church of the Holy Sepulchre; Chiesa di San Sepolcro (Italian)

Architecture
- Architects: Bartolomeo Pradesoli and Jacopo di Modena
- Groundbreaking: 1506
- Completed: 1700s

San Sepolcro is a Roman Catholic church in central Parma, Italy.

== History ==
While a church at the site is documented from the 12th-century, the church on the present layout was built circa 1257 in a Gothic-style. It would have been located then outside of the medieval walls of Parma. The structure underwent various refurbishments, with the facade decoration in a more classical style was added during 1505-1506, work attributed to Bartolomeo Pradesoli and Jacopo di Modena. The nave and the flank facing Strada della Repubblica was not completed in its present Neoclassic style until the 1700s. The 1616 bell-tower is attributed to the architects Malosso or Simone Moschino. The top was not added till 1753. The wooden ceiling was carved between 1613 and 1617 by Lorenzo Zaniboni and Giacomo Trioli. The canvases of various saints in the interior are attributed to the studio of Lionello Spada. The stations of the Via Crucis were sculpted by Giuseppe Carra. The choir ceiling was frescoed by Cesare Baglioni. A guide from 1869, states the main altarpiece was a Resurrection of Christ by Francesco Monti, but more recent descriptions mention a Madonna and Child with young St John the Baptist and Angels by Girolamo Mazzola Bedoli.

Adjacent to the church is the former monastery of the Canons Regular of the Lateran, who officiated at the church from 1257 till 1798, when the order was suppressed. The monastery has a Renaissance cloister designed by Ziliolo da Reggio, the capitals of the columns were sculpted by Antonio Ferrari d'Agrate. In 1566, the monastery received the title of Abbey. The monastery now belongs to the Dominican order.
