= Michelangelo Anselmi =

Italian painter

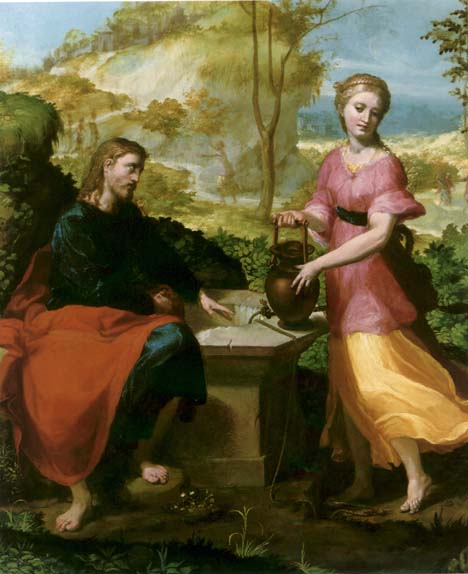
Christ and the Woman of Samaria

Michelangelo Anselmi (c. 1492 – c. 1554) was an Italian Renaissance-Mannerist painter active mostly in Parma.

== Biography ==
He was born, apparently in Tuscany, perhaps in Lucca, from a Parmesan family of ancient Langobard origin, known as Anselmi di Cardano. He moved to Siena around 1500, where he is mentioned as painter for the first time in 1511. He was a pupil of Il Sodoma and Domenico Beccafumi.

He arrived in Parma around 1515. There, he painted frescoes including several decorations in San Giovanni Evangelista, and an altarpiece for the Duomo. In about 1530, he painted Madonna with Saint Sebastian and Saint Roch (now in the National Gallery at Parma). He painted a Baptism of Christ for the Church of San Prospero in Reggio Emilia. Together with his contemporary Rondani he painted a narrative fresco series on the Life of the Virgin for the Oratorio della Concezione in Parma. Anselmi also painted Holy Family with Saint Barbara (c. 1540; now in the National Gallery of Parma). In 1541, he decorated the apse of the church of the Steccata in Parma according to a design, not of Parmigianino who had once been employed in this task, but of Giulio Romano. He also painted an Adoration of the Magi, which after Anselmi's death was completed by Bernardino Gatti.

== Selected works ==
- Apollo and Marysas (c. 1540, National Gallery of Art, Washington DC)
- Saints Jerome and Christine (Pinacoteca di Brera, Milan)
- Virgin and Saints John and Etienne (Louvre, Paris)
- Christ and the Woman of Samaria (Lakewiew Museum, USA)
- Frescoes in the apse and choir of Santa Maria della Steccata, Parma
- Frescoes in the church of San Giovanni Evangelista, Parma
