= Parma =

City in Emilia-Romagna, Italy

Parma Pärma (Emilian)
- Comune
- Comune di Parma
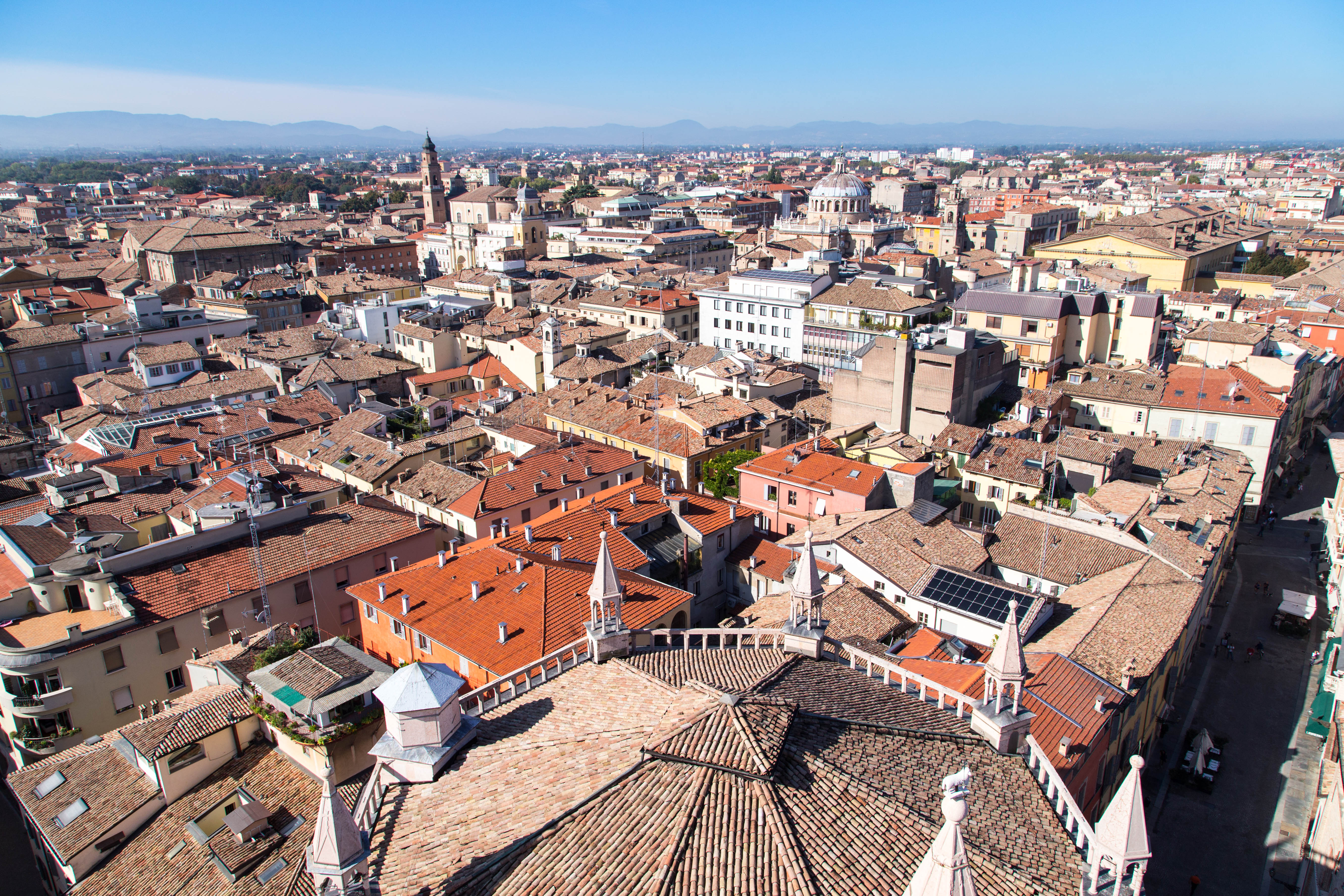
- Aerial view from the Baptistery

- Flag Coat of arms

- Location within Emilia-Romagna Location within Italy Location within Europe
- Coordinates: 44°48′05.3″N 10°19′40.8″E
- Country: Italy
- Region: Emilia-Romagna
- Province: Parma (PR)
- Frazioni: See list

Government
  - Mayor: Michele Guerra

Area
  - Total: 260.60 km^{2} (100.62 sq mi)
- Elevation: 55 m (180 ft)

Population (2026)
  - Total: 199,450
  - Density: 765.35/km^{2} (1,982.2/sq mi)
- Demonym(s): Parmesan, Parmigiano
- Time zone: UTC+1 (CET)
  - Summer (DST): UTC+2 (CEST)
- Postal code: 43121-43126
- Dialing code: 0521
- Patron saint: Sant'Ilario di Poitiers, Sant'Onorato, San Rocco
- Saint day: January 13
- Website: Official website

Parma (Italian: [ˈparma]; Parmigiano: Pärma [ˈpɛːʁmɐ]) is a city in the region of Emilia-Romagna in northern Italy, known for its architecture, music, art, prosciutto (ham), cheese and surrounding countryside. With a population of 199,450 as of 2026, Parma is the second most populous city in Emilia-Romagna after Bologna, the region's capital.

The city is home to the University of Parma, one of the oldest universities in the world. Parma is divided into two parts by the stream of the same name. The district on the west side of the river is Oltretorrente, meaning The other side of the stream. Parma's Etruscan name was adapted by Romans to describe the round shield called Parma.

== History ==
Historical affiliations

Roman Republic 183–27 BC
Roman Empire 27 BC–285 AD
Western Roman Empire 285–476
Kingdom of Odoacer 476–493
Ostrogothic Kingdom 493–553
Eastern Roman Empire 553–568
Lombard Kingdom 568–773
Carolingian Empire 773–781
Regnum Italiae 781–1014
Holy Roman Empire 1014–1114
Free Commune 1114–1341
Duchy of Milan 1341–1513
Papal States 1513–1554
Duchy of Parma 1554–1808
First French Empire 1808–1814
Duchy of Parma, Piacenza, and Guastalla 1814–1848
Duchy of Parma 1851–1859
United Provinces of Central Italy 1859–1860
Kingdom of Italy 1861–1943
Italian Social Republic 1943–1945
Italian Republic 1946–present

=== Prehistory ===
Parma was already a built-up area in the Bronze Age. In the current position of the city rose a terramare. The "terramare" (marl earth) were ancient villages built of wood on piles according to a defined scheme and squared form; constructed on dry land and generally in proximity to the rivers. During this age (between 1500 BC and 800 BC) the first necropoleis (on the sites of the present-day Piazza Duomo and Piazzale della Macina) were constructed.

=== Antiquity ===
The city was most probably founded and named by the Etruscans, for a parma or palma (circular shield) was a Latin borrowing, as were many Roman terms for particular arms, and the names Parmeal, Parmni and Parmnial appear in Etruscan inscriptions. Diodorus Siculus reported that the Romans had changed their rectangular shields for round ones, imitating the Etruscans. Whether the Etruscan encampment acquired its name from its round shape, like a shield, or from its metaphorical function as a shield against the Gauls to the north, remains uncertain.

The Roman colony was founded in 183 BC, together with Mutina (Modena); 2,000 families were settled. Parma had a certain importance as a road hub over the Via Aemilia and the Via Claudia. It had a forum, in what is today the central Garibaldi Square. In April 43 BC the city was destroyed. Subsequently Augustus rebuilt it. During the Roman Empire, it gained the title of Julia for its loyalty to the imperial house.

Attila sacked the city in 452, and the Germanic king Odoacer later gifted it to his followers. During the Gothic War, however, Totila destroyed it. It was then part of the Byzantine Exarchate of Ravenna (changing its name to Chrysopolis, "Golden City", probably due to the presence of the imperial treasury) and, from 569, of the Lombard Kingdom of Italy. During the Middle Ages, Parma became an important stage of the Via Francigena, the main road connecting Rome to Northern Europe; several castles, hospitals and inns were built in the following centuries to host the increasing number of pilgrims who passed by Parma and Fidenza, following the Apennines via Collecchio, Berceto and the Corchia ranges before descending the Passo della Cisa into Tuscany, heading finally south toward Rome.

The city had a medieval Jewish community. The Palatine Library houses the largest collection of Hebrew manuscripts in Italy, and the second-largest in the world after the Bodleian Library in Oxford.

=== Middle Ages ===
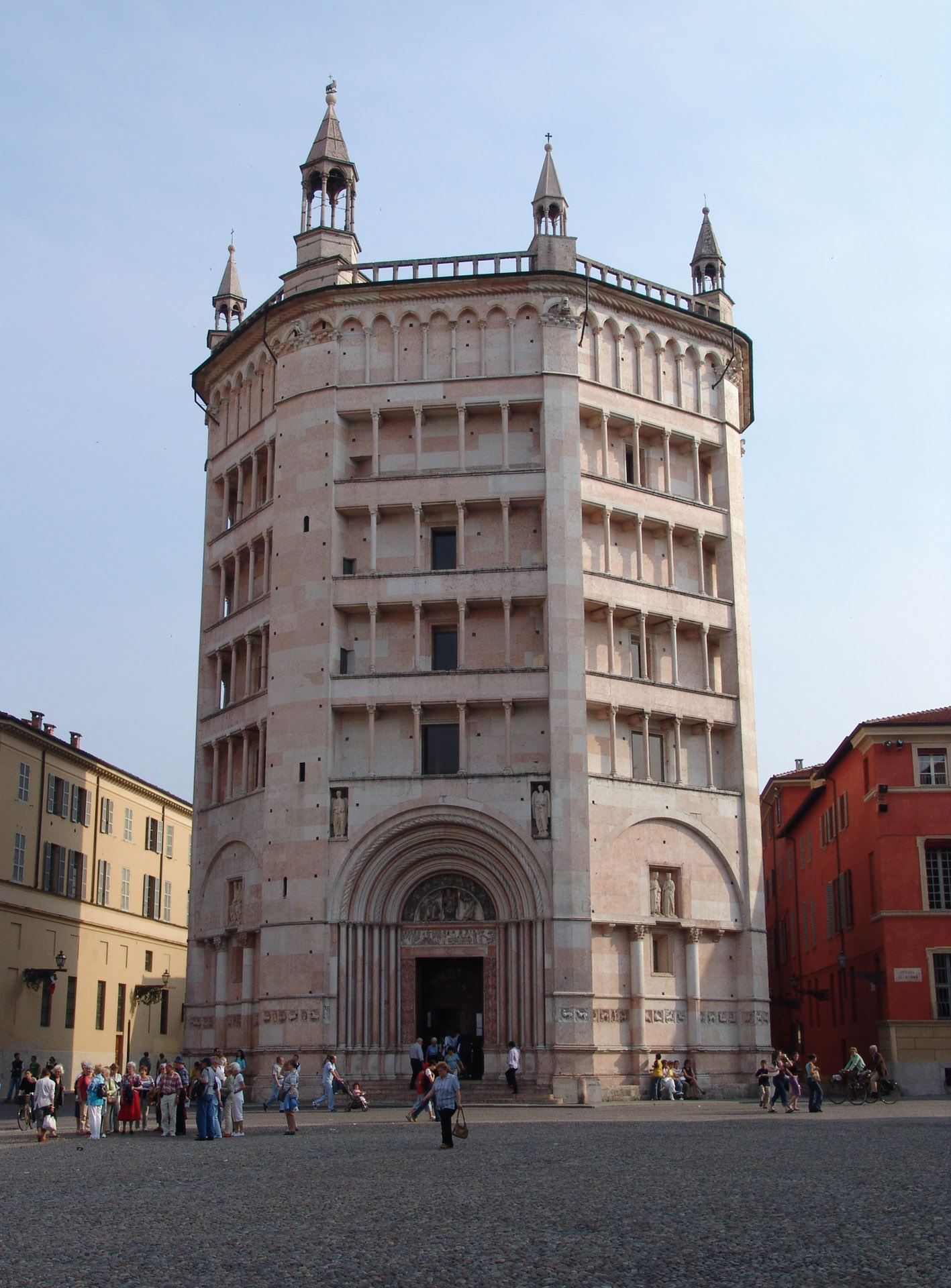
Baptistery of Parma, 1196–1270

Under Frankish rule, Parma became the capital of a county in 774. Like most northern Italian cities, it was nominally a part of the Holy Roman Empire created by Charlemagne, but locally ruled by its bishops, the first being Guibodus. In the subsequent struggles between the Papacy and the Empire, Parma was usually a member of the Imperial party. Two of its bishops became antipopes: Càdalo, founder of the cathedral, as Honorius II; and Guibert, as Clement III. An almost independent commune was created around 1140; a treaty between Parma and Piacenza of 1149 is the earliest document of a comune headed by consuls. After the Peace of Constance in 1183 confirmed the Italian communes' rights of self-governance, long-standing quarrels with the neighbouring communes of Reggio Emilia, Piacenza and Cremona became harsher, with the aim of controlling the vital trading line over the Po River.

The struggle between Guelphs and Ghibellines was a feature of Parma too. In 1213, her podestà was the Guelph Rambertino Buvalelli. Then, after a long stance alongside the emperors, the Papist families of the city gained control in 1248. The city was besieged in 1247–48 by Emperor Frederick II, who was however defeated in the battle that ensued but imperial forces revenged the loss soon afterwards and heavily defeated the Parmese. Frederick II recovered before his death in 1250, with Parma suing for peace.

By 1328, Rolando de' Rossi was made signore of Parma. In 1331, the city submitted to King John of Bohemia. Parma fell under the control of Milan in 1341. After a short-lived period of independence under the Terzi family (1404–1409), the Sforza imposed their rule (1440–1449) through their associated families of Pallavicino, Rossi, Sanvitale and Da Correggio. These created a kind of new feudalism, building towers and castles throughout the city and the land. These fiefs evolved into truly independent states: the Landi governed the higher Taro's valley from 1257 to 1682. The Pallavicino seignory extended over the eastern part of today's province, with the capital in Busseto. Parma's territories were an exception for Northern Italy, as its feudal subdivision frequently continued until more recent years. For example, Solignano was a Pallavicino family possession until 1805, and San Secondo belonged to the Rossi well into the 19th century.

=== Modern era ===
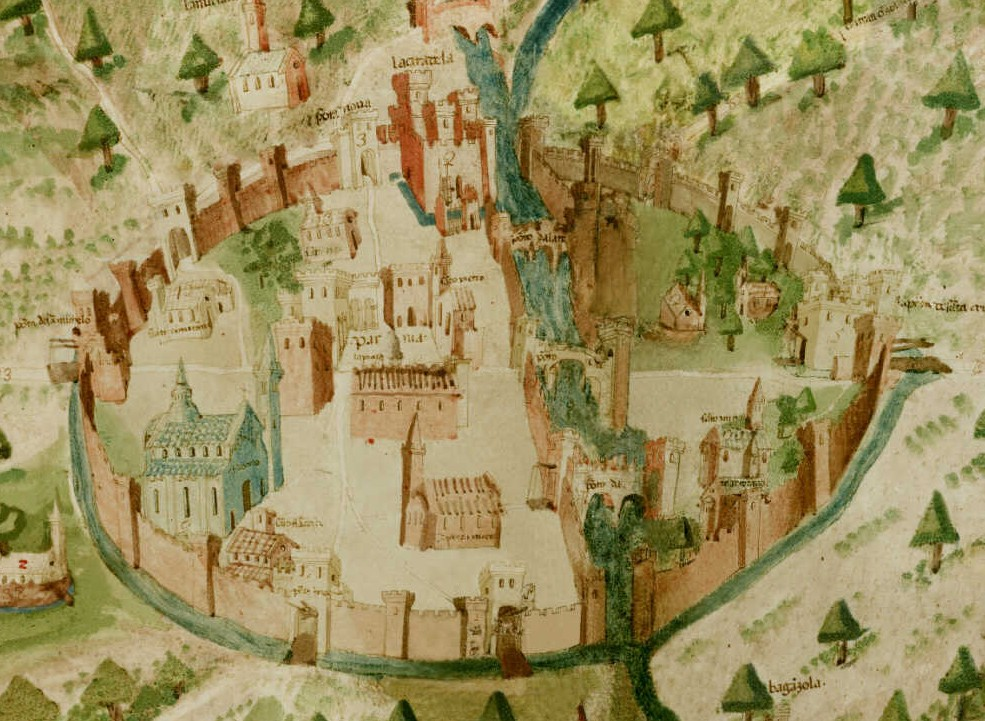
Parma in the 15th century

Between the 14th and the 15th centuries, Parma was at the centre of the Italian Wars. The Battle of Fornovo was fought in its territory. The French held the city in 1500–1521, with a short Papal parenthesis in 1512–1515. After the foreigners were expelled, Parma belonged to the Papal States until 1545.

In that year the Farnese pope, Paul III, detached Parma and Piacenza from the Papal States and gave them as a duchy to his illegitimate son, Pier Luigi Farnese, whose descendants ruled in Parma until 1731, when Antonio Farnese, last male of the Farnese line, died. In 1594 a constitution was promulgated, the University enhanced and the Nobles' College founded. There was also an important Jesuit college in Parma: it was the largest owned by the order in the entire region of Emilia-Romagna and it acquired a strong reputation in the scientific field, given that Fathers Giuseppe Biancani, Niccolò Cabeo and Mario Bettinus, all members of the order, taught there. The war to reduce the barons' power continued for several years: in 1612 Barbara Sanseverino was executed in the central square of Parma, together with six other nobles charged of plotting against the duke. At the end of the 17th century, after the defeat of Pallavicini (1588) and Landi (1682) the Farnese duke could finally hold with firm hand all Parmense territories. The castle of the Sanseverino in Colorno was turned into a luxurious summer palace by Ferdinando Bibiena.

In the Treaty of London (1718) it was promulgated that the heir to the combined Duchy of Parma and Piacenza would be Elisabeth Farnese's elder son with Philip V of Spain, Don Carlos. In 1731, the fifteen-year-old Don Carlos became Charles I Duke of Parma and Piacenza, at the death of his childless great uncle Antonio Farnese. In 1734, Charles I conquered the kingdoms of Naples and Sicily, and was crowned as the King of Naples and Sicily on 3 July 1735, leaving the Duchy of Parma to his brother Philip (Filippo I di Borbone-Parma). All the outstanding art collections of the duke's palaces of Parma, Colorno and Sala Baganza were moved to Naples.

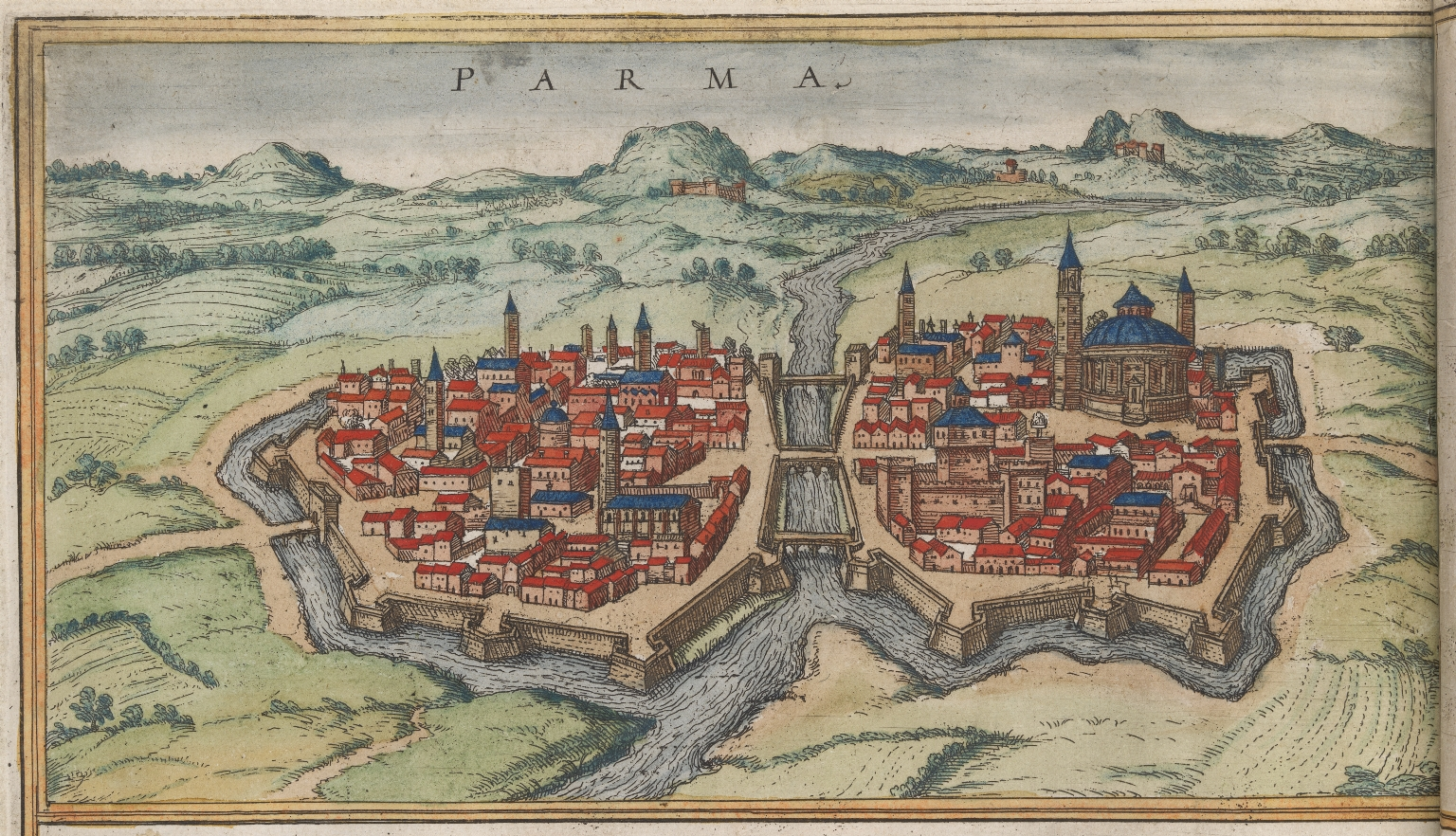
The city of Parma, divided by the river of the same name, with the imposing Romanesque Cathedral of the Ascension of the Virgin prominent on the right bank. 16th century.

Parma was under French influence after the Peace of Aachen (1748). Parma became a modern state with the energetic action of prime minister Guillaume du Tillot. He created the bases for a modern industry and fought strenuously against the church's privileges. The city lived a period of particular splendour: the Biblioteca Palatina (Palatine Library), the Archaeological Museum, the Picture Gallery and the Botanical Garden were founded, together with the Royal Printing Works directed by Giambattista Bodoni, aided by the Amoretti Brothers as skilled and inspired punchcutters.

=== Contemporary age ===
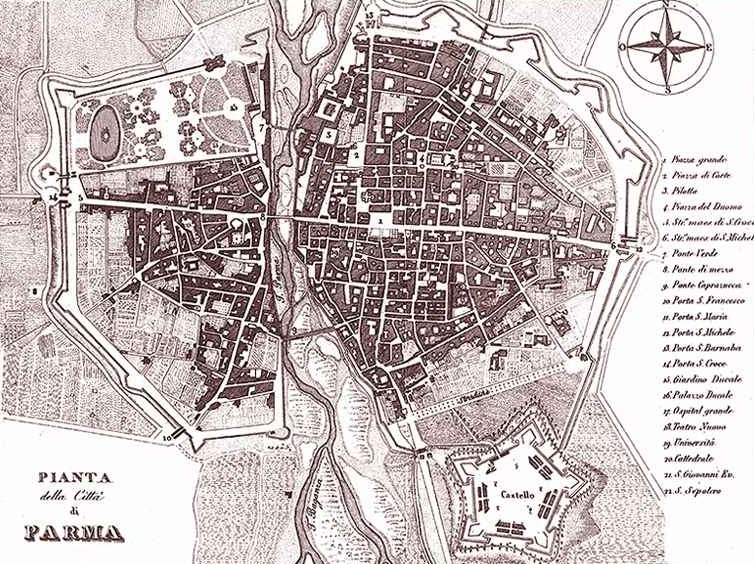
Parma in 1832

During the Napoleonic Wars (1802–1814), Parma was annexed to France and made capital of the Taro Department. Under its French name, Parme, it was also created a duché grand-fief de l'Empire for Charles-François Lebrun, duc de Plaisance, the Emperor's Arch-Treasurer, on 24 April 1808 (extinguished in 1926).

After the restoration of the Duchy of Parma by the 1814–15 Vienna Congress, the Risorgimento's upheavals had no fertile ground in the tranquil duchy. In 1847, after Marie Louise, Duchess of Parma's death, it passed again to the House of Bourbon, the last of whom was stabbed in the city and left it to his widow, Luisa Maria of Berry. On 15 September 1859 the dynasty was declared deposed, and Parma entered the newly formed province of Emilia under Luigi Carlo Farini. With the plebiscite of 1860 the former duchy became part of the unified Kingdom of Italy.

The loss of the capital role provoked an economic and social crisis in Parma. It started to recover its role of industrial prominence after the railway connection with Piacenza and Bologna of 1859, and with Fornovo and Suzzara in 1883. Trade unions were strong in the city, in which a notable General Strike was declared from 1 May to 6 June 1908. The struggle with Fascism had its most dramatic moment in August 1922, when the regime officer Italo Balbo attempted to enter the popular quarter of Oltretorrente. The citizens organized into the Arditi del Popolo ("The people's daring ones") and pushed back the squadristi. This episode is considered the first example of Resistance in Italy.

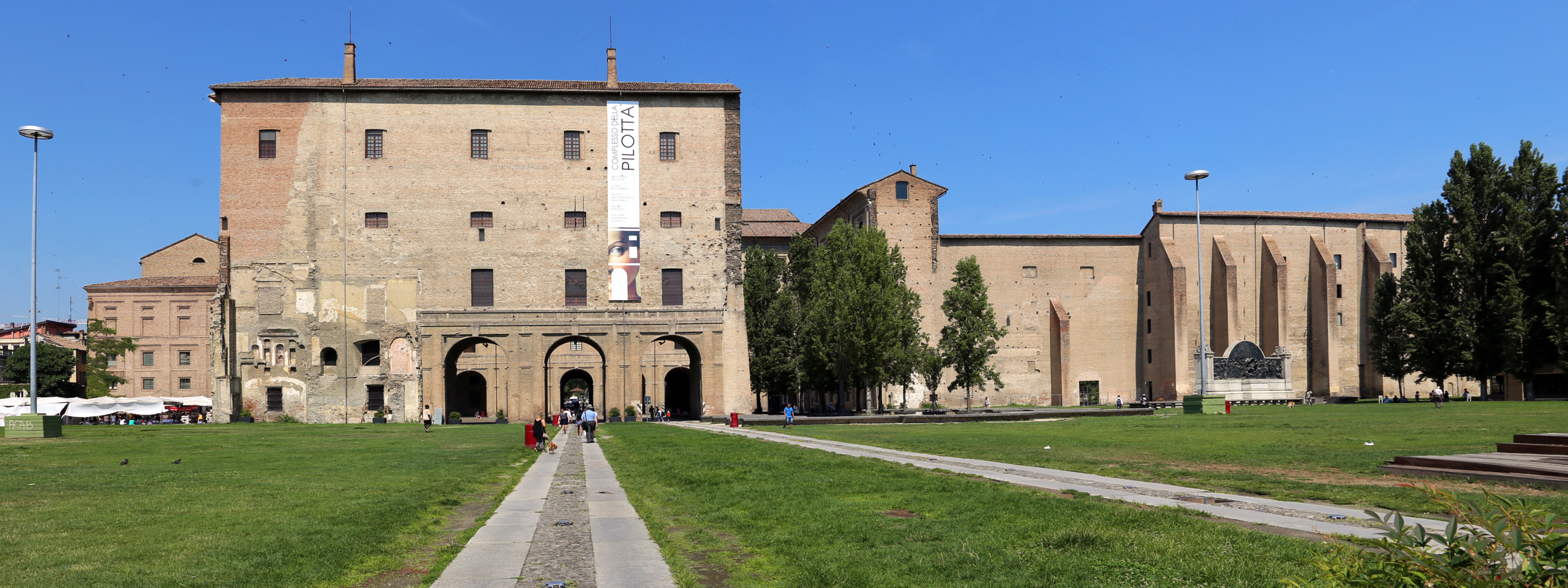
View of Palazzo della Pilotta in Piazza della Pace. The rebuilt part on the right is where once was the church of St. Peter.

During World War II, Parma was a strong centre of partisan resistance. The train station and marshalling yards were targets for high altitude bombing by the Allies in the spring of 1944. Much of the Palazzo della Pilotta, situated not far (half a mile) from the train station, was destroyed. Along with it the Teatro Farnese and part of the Biblioteca Palatina were destroyed by Allied bombs; some 21,000 volumes of the library's collection were lost. Several other monuments were also damaged: Palazzo del Giardino, Steccata and San Giovanni churches, Palazzo Ducale, Paganini theater and the monument to Verdi. However, Parma did not see widespread destruction during the war. Parma was liberated from the German occupation (1943–1945) on 26 April 1945 by the partisan resistance and the Brazilian Expeditionary Force.

While modern city politics has been dominated (as in much of Emilia-Romagna) by the left, in 1998 Parma elected centre-right candidate Elvio Ubaldi as mayor, again in 2002, and in 2007 elected the centre-right candidate Pietro Vignali. During their terms, Parma suffered from fiscal mismanagement, Vignali left office in 2011 with the city's debts amounting to over 600 million euros. In 2012, the city elected Federico Pizzarotti as mayor, making him the first mayor of a provincial capital to hail from Five Star Movement.

== Geography ==
=== Climate ===
In Parma, the average annual high temperature is 17 °C (63 °F), the annual low temperature is 9 °C (48 °F), and the annual precipitation is 777 millimetres (30.59 inches).

The following data comes from the weather station located at the university in the city center. It is affected by the urban heat island phenomenon. Parma has a mid-latitude, four-season humid subtropical climate (Köppen: Cfa) with heavy continental influences due to the city's inland position. Relatively nearby coastal areas like Genoa have far milder climates with cooler summers and milder winters, with the mountains separating Parma from the Mediterranean Sea acting as a barrier to the sea air. The city receives approximately 45 cm of snow each winter.

Climate data for Parma (1991–2020 normals, extremes 1878–present)
Month	Jan	Feb	Mar	Apr	May	Jun	Jul	Aug	Sep	Oct	Nov	Dec	Year
Record high °C (°F)	24.6 (76.3)	23.7 (74.7)	28.6 (83.5)	32.5 (90.5)	35.7 (96.3)	39.2 (102.6)	40.2 (104.4)	40.4 (104.7)	37.9 (100.2)	33.3 (91.9)	22.0 (71.6)	23.4 (74.1)	40.4 (104.7)
Mean daily maximum °C (°F)	6.8 (44.2)	9.8 (49.6)	15.4 (59.7)	19.3 (66.7)	24.4 (75.9)	29.0 (84.2)	31.6 (88.9)	31.1 (88.0)	25.4 (77.7)	18.6 (65.5)	11.9 (53.4)	7.2 (45.0)	19.2 (66.6)
Daily mean °C (°F)	3.2 (37.8)	5.1 (41.2)	9.8 (49.6)	13.9 (57.0)	18.7 (65.7)	23.0 (73.4)	25.4 (77.7)	25.1 (77.2)	20.3 (68.5)	14.4 (57.9)	11.0 (51.8)	5.1 (41.2)	14.6 (58.3)
Mean daily minimum °C (°F)	−0.4 (31.3)	0.5 (32.9)	4.3 (39.7)	8.5 (47.3)	13.0 (55.4)	17.0 (62.6)	19.1 (66.4)	19.0 (66.2)	14.9 (58.8)	10.5 (50.9)	5.4 (41.7)	0.7 (33.3)	9.4 (48.9)
Record low °C (°F)	−18.0 (−0.4)	−15.0 (5.0)	−7.5 (18.5)	−2.0 (28.4)	1.0 (33.8)	6.5 (43.7)	11.0 (51.8)	9.6 (49.3)	6.3 (43.3)	−1.8 (28.8)	−9.1 (15.6)	−14.8 (5.4)	−18.0 (−0.4)
Average precipitation mm (inches)	43.7 (1.72)	50.2 (1.98)	52.9 (2.08)	80.1 (3.15)	73.6 (2.90)	61.0 (2.40)	28.1 (1.11)	51.1 (2.01)	70.3 (2.77)	104.1 (4.10)	98.3 (3.87)	60.5 (2.38)	773.9 (30.47)
Average precipitation days (≥ 1.0 mm)	7	7	8	9	9	7	4	5	6	9	9	8	88
Source 1: Arpae Emilia-Romagna
Source 2: Temperature estreme in Toscana (extremes) Climi e viaggi (precipitation days)

== Demographics ==
Historical population
Year	Pop.	±%
1861	68,284	—
1871	68,889	+0.9%
1881	68,382	−0.7%
1901	77,004	+12.6%
1911	84,140	+9.3%
1921	96,347	+14.5%
1931	106,400	+10.4%
1936	109,365	+2.8%
1951	122,978	+12.4%
1961	147,368	+19.8%
1971	175,228	+18.9%
1981	179,019	+2.2%
1991	170,520	−4.7%
2001	163,457	−4.1%
2011	175,895	+7.6%
2021	195,436	+11.1%
Source: ISTAT

As of 2026, the population is 199,450, of which 48.8% are males, and 51.2% are females. Minors make up 15.0% of the population, and seniors make up 22.9%.

=== Immigration ===
As of 2025, immigrants make up 19.9% of the population. The 5 largest foreign countries of birth are Moldova, Albania, Philippines, Tunisia, and Romania.

Foreign-born population (2025)
Country of birth	Population
Moldova	6,322
Albania	3,450
Philippines	2,505
Tunisia	2,149
Romania	1,702
Nigeria	1,659
Ukraine	1,538
Morocco	1,487
Ghana	1,202
Ivory Coast	1,078
Pakistan	1,016
India	995
Senegal	901
China	759
Cameroon	634

== Sights ==
=== Religious buildings ===
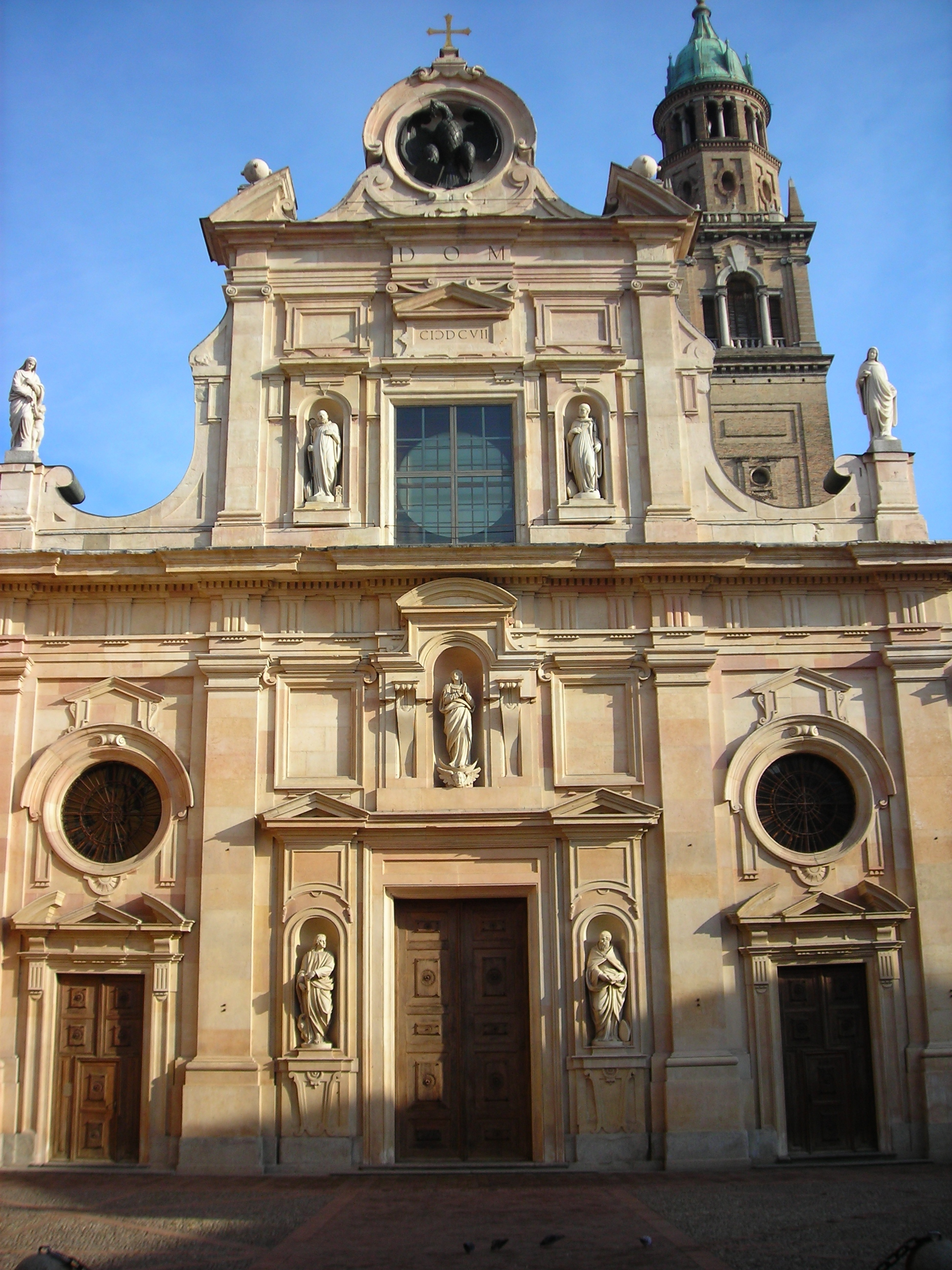
Late Mannerist façade of the church of San Giovanni Evangelista, by Simone Moschino (1604), with sculpture by Giambattista Carra da Bissone

- Parma Cathedral (begun 1090) – Romanesque church housing a 12th-century sculpture by Benedetto Antelami and the dome fresco (1526–1530) by Antonio da Correggio.
- Baptistery (begun 1196) – pink Verona marble baptistery by Antelami, adjacent to the cathedral.
- San Giovanni Evangelista (10th century; rebuilt 1498 & 1510) – abbey church behind the cathedral's apse, with a late-Mannerist façade by Simone Moschino. The cupola is frescoed with Correggio's Vision of St. John the Evangelist (1520–22), a landmark in illusionistic perspective ceilings. Cloisters and library also notable.
- Sanctuary of Santa Maria della Steccata (begun 1521) – octagonal Renaissance church famous for Correggio's cupola frescoes.
- Sant'Uldarico, Parma (built 1411) – late-Gothic church originally part of a convent.
- San Paolo, Parma (11th century) – former Benedictine convent housing Correggio's frescoes in the Camera di San Paolo (1519–20) and paintings by Alessandro Araldi.
- San Francesco del Prato (13th century) – Gothic church used as a jail from the Napoleonic era until the 1990s, when its 16 façade windows were reopened. The Oratory of the Concezione contains frescoes by Michelangelo Anselmi and Francesco Rondani.
- Santa Croce (12th century) – Romanesque church with a nave and two aisles ending in a semicircular apse. Rebuilt in 1415 and again in 1635–66. Nave frescoes by Giovanni Maria Conti, Francesco Reti and Antonio Lombardi date from these periods.
- San Marcellino, Parma (16th century) former church, first documented in 1074; church was rebuilt and reconsecrated in 1543, Deconsecrated in 1928.
- San Sepolcro (1275) – church erected over an earlier building; interiors renovated in 1506, 1603 and 1701. The Baroque bell tower dates to 1616 and its bells to 1753. Adjacent stands the former monastery (1493–95) of the Lateran Canons.
- Santa Caterina d'Alessandria (14th century) – Gothic church noted for its lancet windows and simple brick façade.
- Santa Maria del Quartiere (1604–19) – unusual hexagonal-plan church; cupola frescoes by Pier Antonio Bernabei and pupils.
- San Rocco (rebuilt 1754) – late-Baroque church dedicated to one of Parma's patron saints.
- Santa Cristina (begun 1610) – Baroque church renowned for its elaborate stucco decoration.

=== Secular buildings ===
- Palazzo Ducale (begun 1622) – former residence of the Farnese dukes, featuring Baroque interiors and the Theatre of the Ducal Palace.
- Palazzo della Pilotta (1583) – houses the Academy of Fine Arts (School of Parma), the Palatine Library, the National Gallery, the Archaeological Museum, the Bodoni Museum, and the Farnese Theatre. Partially destroyed during World War II.
- Palazzo del Giardino (1561) – designed by Jacopo Barozzi da Vignola for Duke Ottavio Farnese on the former Sforza castle site; enlarged in the 17th–18th centuries. Includes the Palazzo Eucherio Sanvitale with 16th-century decorations attributed to Gianfrancesco d'Agrate and a fresco by Parmigianino. The annexed Ducal Park was laid out in French style in 1749.
- Palazzo del Comune (1627) – municipal offices.
- Palazzo del Governatore (13th century) – Governor's Palace.
- Bishop's Palace (1055) – episcopal residence adjacent to the cathedral.
- Ospedale Vecchio (1250) – old hospital later renovated in Renaissance style.
- Palazzo Tarasconi (19th century) – historic urban palace now used as an exhibition space.

=== Other sites of interest ===
- The Cittadella (16th century) – fortress erected by Duke Alessandro Farnese, adjacent to the old city walls.
- Pons Lapidis (reign of Augustus, 1st century AD) – ruins of an ancient Roman stone bridge also known as the Roman Bridge or Theoderic's Bridge.
- Orto Botanico di Parma (est. 1773) – botanical garden maintained by the University of Parma.
- Teatro Farnese (1618–19) – all-wood theatre designed by Giovan Battista Aleotti; commissioned by Duke Ranuccio I Farnese for the visit of Cosimo I de' Medici.
- Teatro Regio (1821–29) – city opera house by Nicola Bettoli, featuring a Neoclassical façade and a porch with a double window order.
- Auditorium Niccolò Paganini – concert hall designed by Renzo Piano.
- Museum House of Arturo Toscanini – birthplace of conductor Arturo Toscanini, now a museum.
- Museo Lombardi – exhibits art and historical items related to Maria Luigia of Habsburg and Napoleon Bonaparte, as well as documents of the Duchy of Parma in the 18th–19th centuries.

== Culture ==
=== Food and cuisine ===
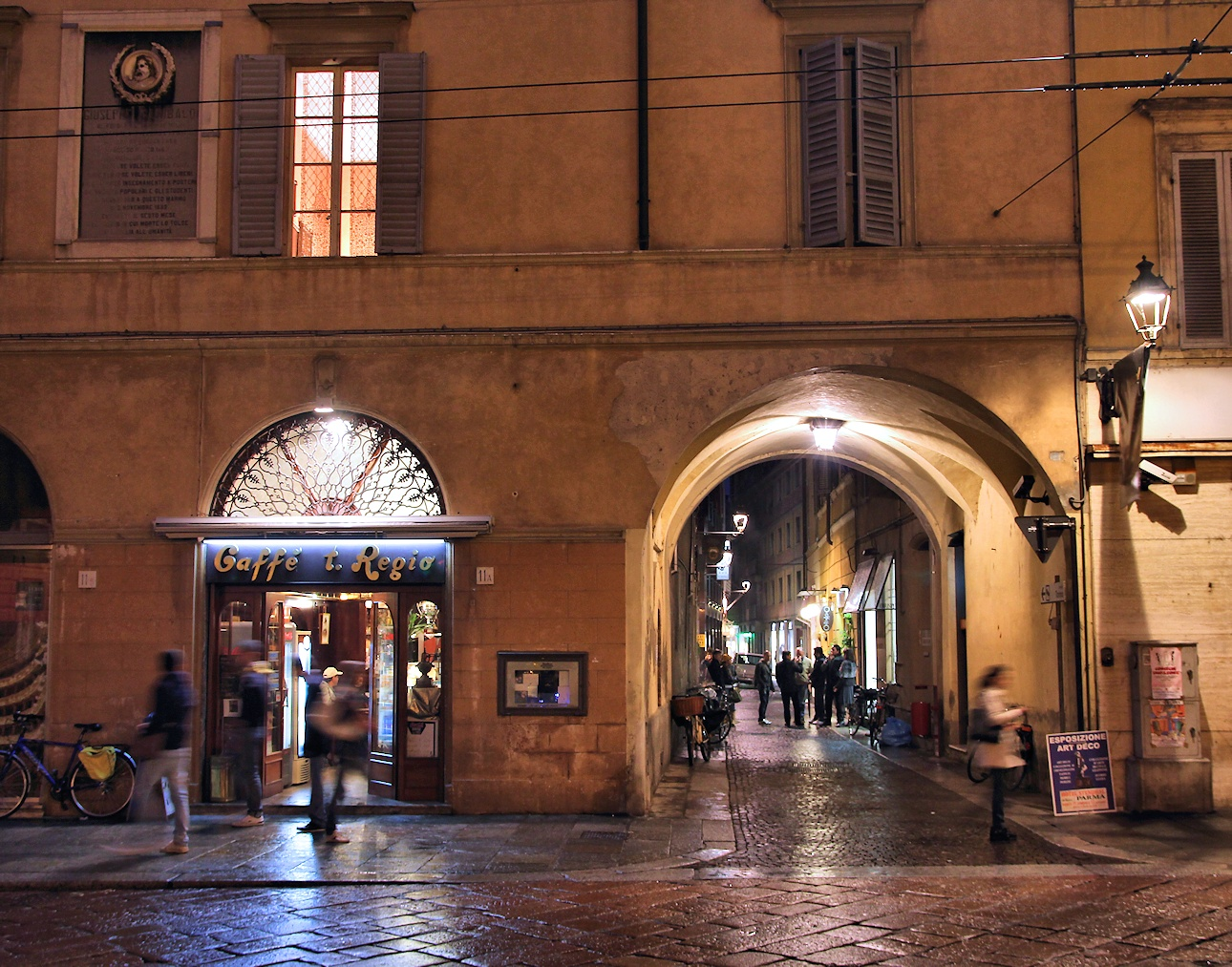
Caffè Teatro Regio in front of the theatre

Parma is famous for its food and rich gastronomical tradition: two of its specialties are Parmigiano Reggiano cheese (also produced in Reggio Emilia) and Prosciutto di Parma ("Parma ham"), both given Protected designation of origin status. Parma also claims several stuffed pasta dishes, such as tortelli d'erbetta and anolini in brodo.

In 2004, Parma was appointed the seat of the European Food Safety Authority (EFSA) and was appointed to the Creative Cities Network as UNESCO City of Gastronomy. Parma also has two food multinationals, Barilla and Parmalat, and a medium-large food tourism sector, represented by Parma Golosa and Food Valley companies.

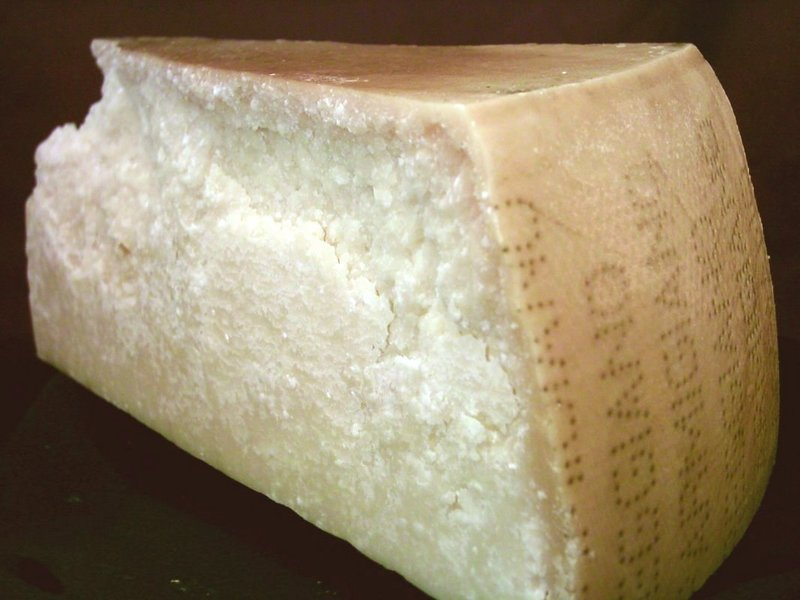
Parmigiano Reggiano cheese, the true "Parmesan"

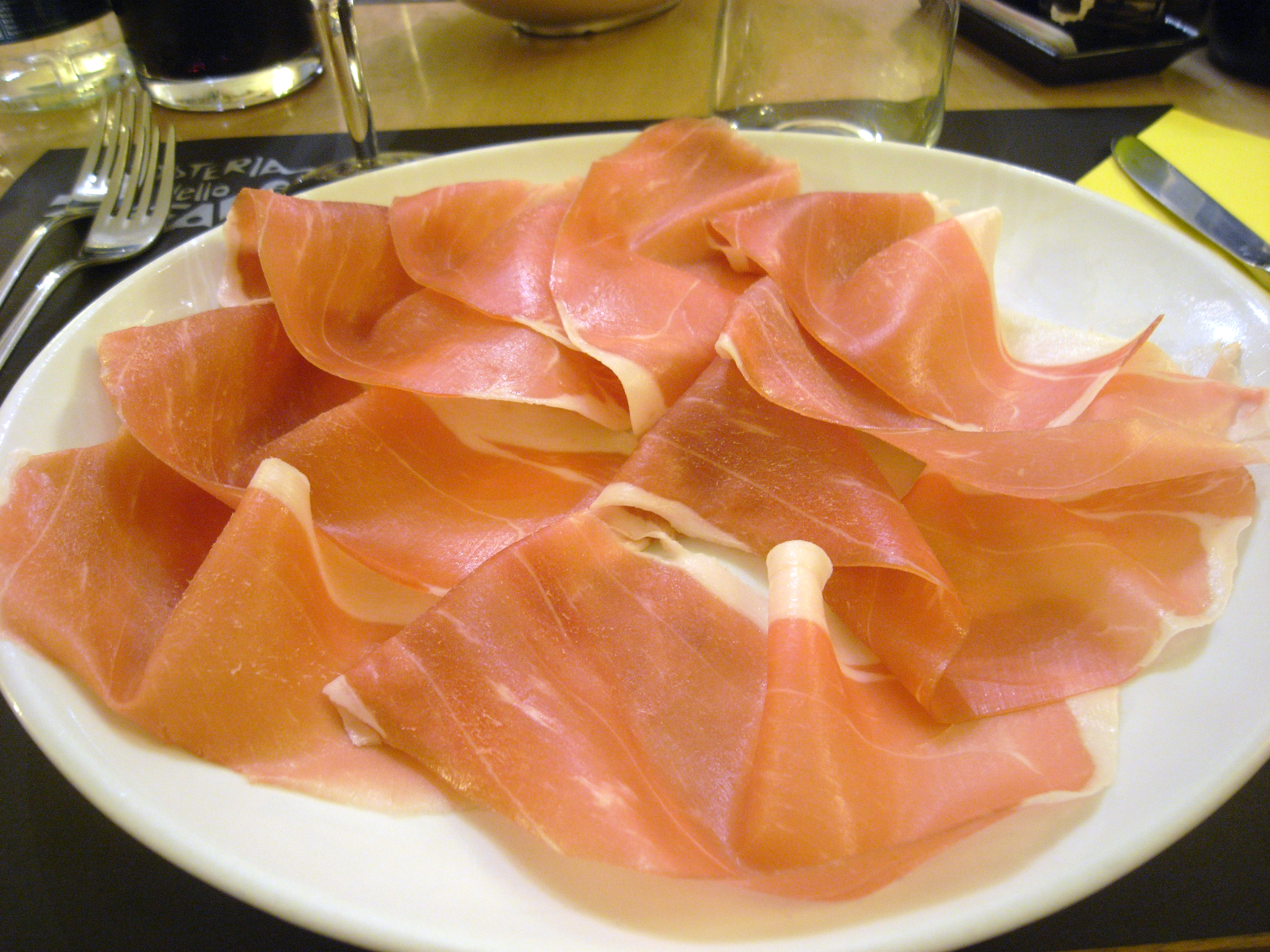
Prosciutto di Parma (cured ham)

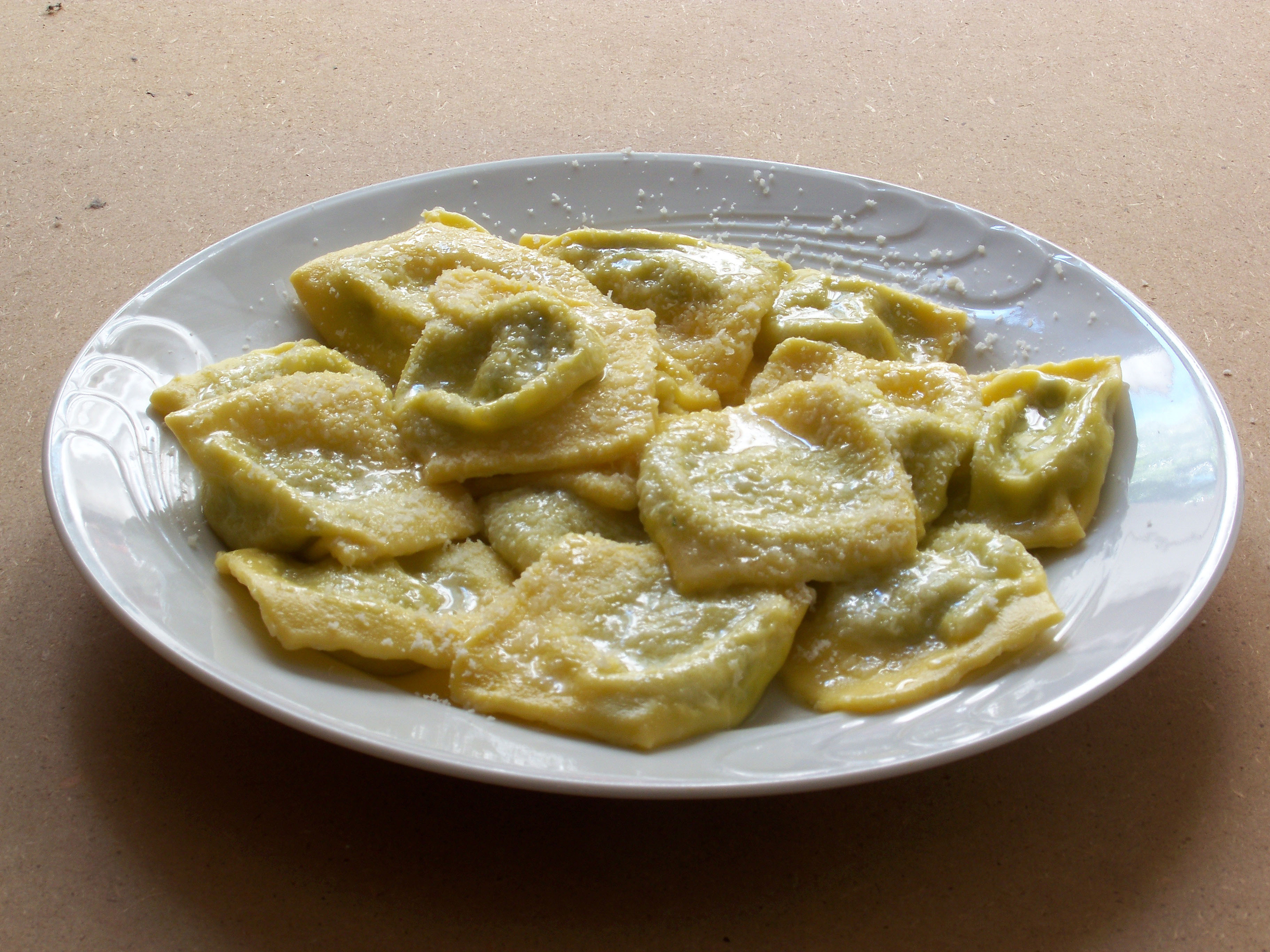
Tortelli d'erbetta

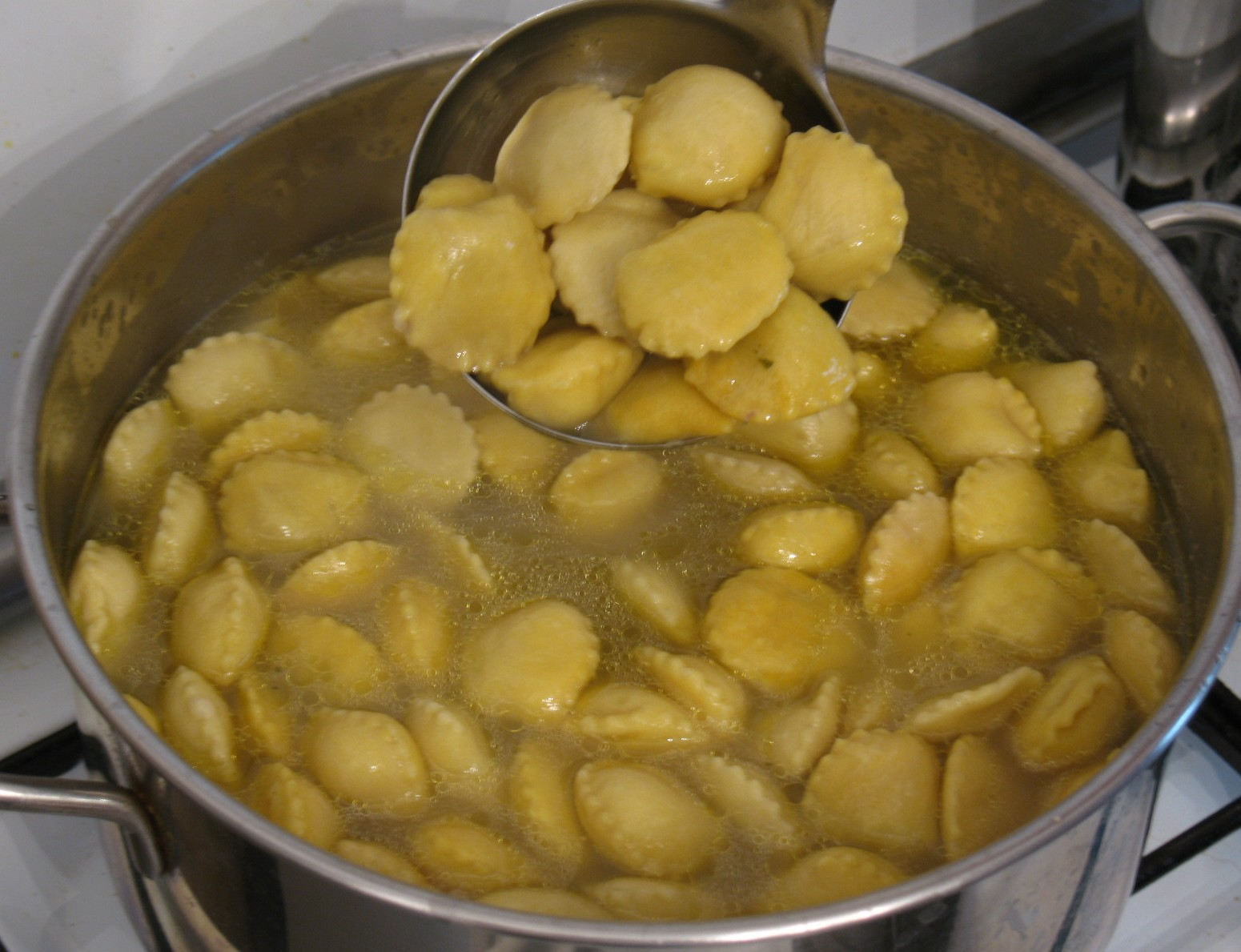
Anolini in brodo

== Frazioni ==
The comune (municipality) of Parma is subdivided into a number of frazioni (villages and hamlets): Alberi, Baganzola, Beneceto, Botteghino, Ca'Terzi, Calestano, Carignano, Carpaneto, Cartiera, Casalbaroncolo, Casalora di Ravadese, Casaltone, Case Capelli, Case Cocconi, Case Crostolo, Case Nuove, Case Rosse, Case Vecchie, Casino dalla Rosa, Casagnola, Castelletto, Castelnovo, Cervara, Chiozzola, Coloreto, Colorno, Corcagnano, Eia, Fontanini, Fontanellato, Fontevivo, Gaione, Ghiaiata Nuova, Il Moro, La Catena, La Palazzina, Malandriano, Marano, Marore, Martorano, Molino di Malandriano, Osteria San Martino, Panocchia, Paradigna, Pedrignano, Pilastrello, Pizzolese, Ponte, Porporano, Pozzetto Piccolo, Quercioli, Ravadese, Ronco Pascolo, Rosa, San Pancrazio, San Prospero, San Ruffino, San Secondo, Sissa, Soragna, Terenzo, Tizzano Val Parma, Traversetolo, Trecasali, Valera, Viarolo, Viazza, Vicofertile, Vicomero, Vigatto, Vigheffio, Vigolante.

== Economy ==
Parma has a thriving economy, and the local food industry is highly specialized. Some of the largest companies in this sector include Barilla, which is based in the city. Chiesi Farmaceutici, in the pharma industry, is headquartered in Parma. The European Food Safety Authority is also based in Parma.

== Transport ==
Parma railway station is on the Milan–Bologna railway system.

The Parma trolleybus system has been in operation since 1953. It replaced an earlier tramway network, and presently comprises four trolleybus routes.

The city is served by Aeroporto Internazionale di Parma. However, the airport only provides commercial flights to limited European destinations. The nearest international airport is Bologna Guglielmo Marconi Airport, which is located 94 km (58 mi) east of Parma.

== Sport ==
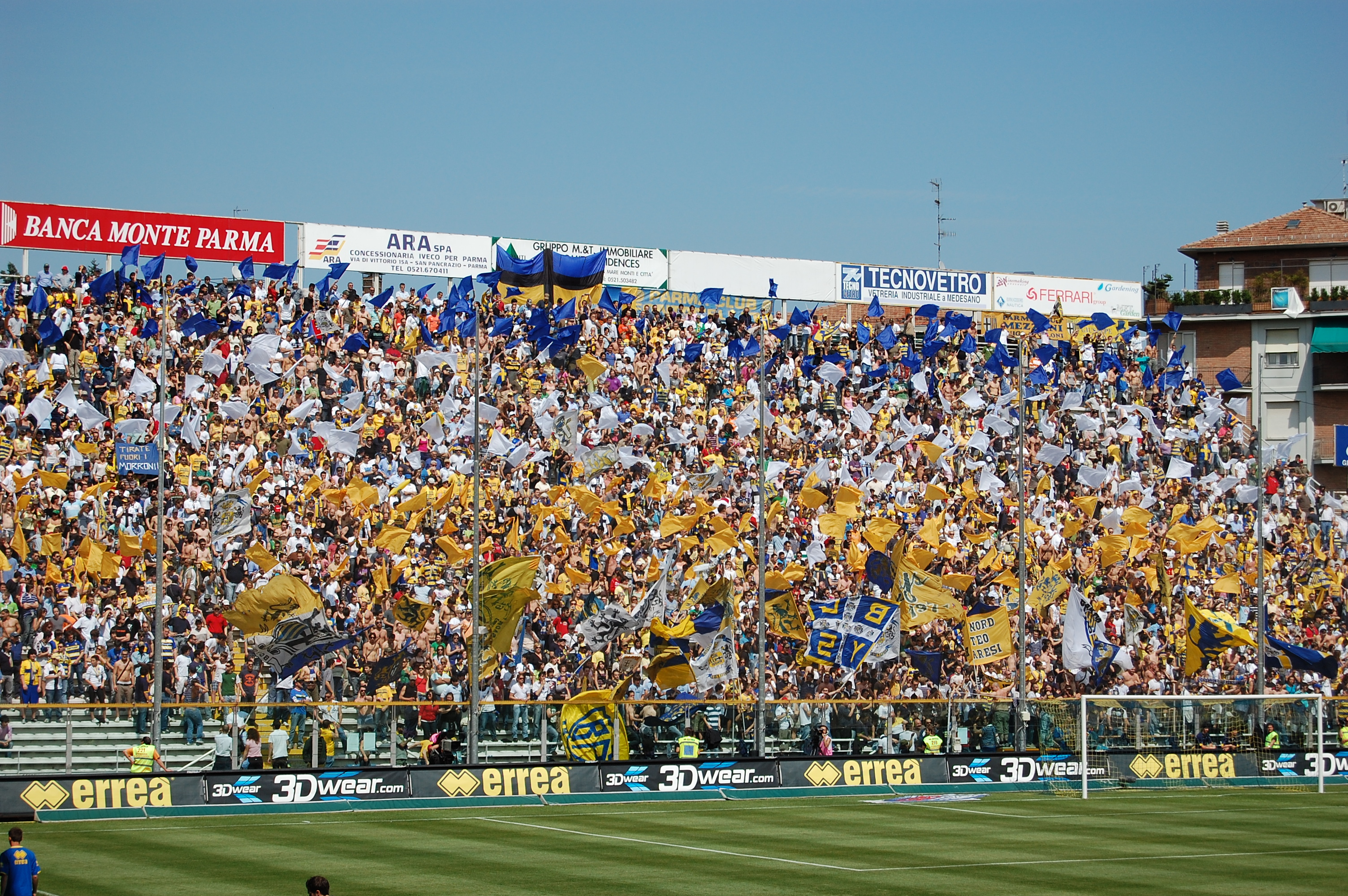
Parma F.C. fans at the Stadio Ennio Tardini, one of the oldest stadiums in Italy

Parma Calcio 1913, founded in 2015, is a Serie A (first division) football club. It replaced Parma F.C., which went bankrupt in 2015. It plays in the city's Stadio Ennio Tardini, which opened in 1923 and seats up to 23,000.

Parma's other sport team is the rugby union club Zebre which competes in Pro14, one of the top rugby competitions in the world. Parma also is home to two rugby union teams in the top national division, Overmach Rugby Parma and SKG Gran Rugby.

Parma Panthers is the Parma American football team which provided the basis for John Grisham's book Playing for Pizza. Stadio Sergio Lanfranchi is the ground of rugby and American football teams.

Pallavolo Parma and Parma Baseball are other sports teams in the city. Nino Cavalli Stadium is a baseball stadium located in Parma. It is the home stadium of Parma Baseball of the Italian Baseball League.

== International relations ==
=== Twin towns – sister cities ===
Parma is twinned with:

- Bourg-en-Bresse, France
- Ljubljana, Slovenia
- Shijiazhuang, China
- Szeged, Hungary
- Tours, France
- Worms, Germany
- Stockton, United States

== Notable people ==
=== Painters and sculptors ===
- Michelangelo Anselmi, painter born in Tuscany
- Benedetto Antelami, architect and sculptor
- Alessandro Araldi, painter
- Sisto Badalocchio, painter
- Jacopo Bertoia (Giacomo Zanguidi or Jacopo Zanguidi or Bertoja), painter
- Amedeo Bocchi, painter
- Giulio Carmignani, painter
- Antonio da Correggio (Antonio Allegri), born in Correggio (Reggio Emilia), painter

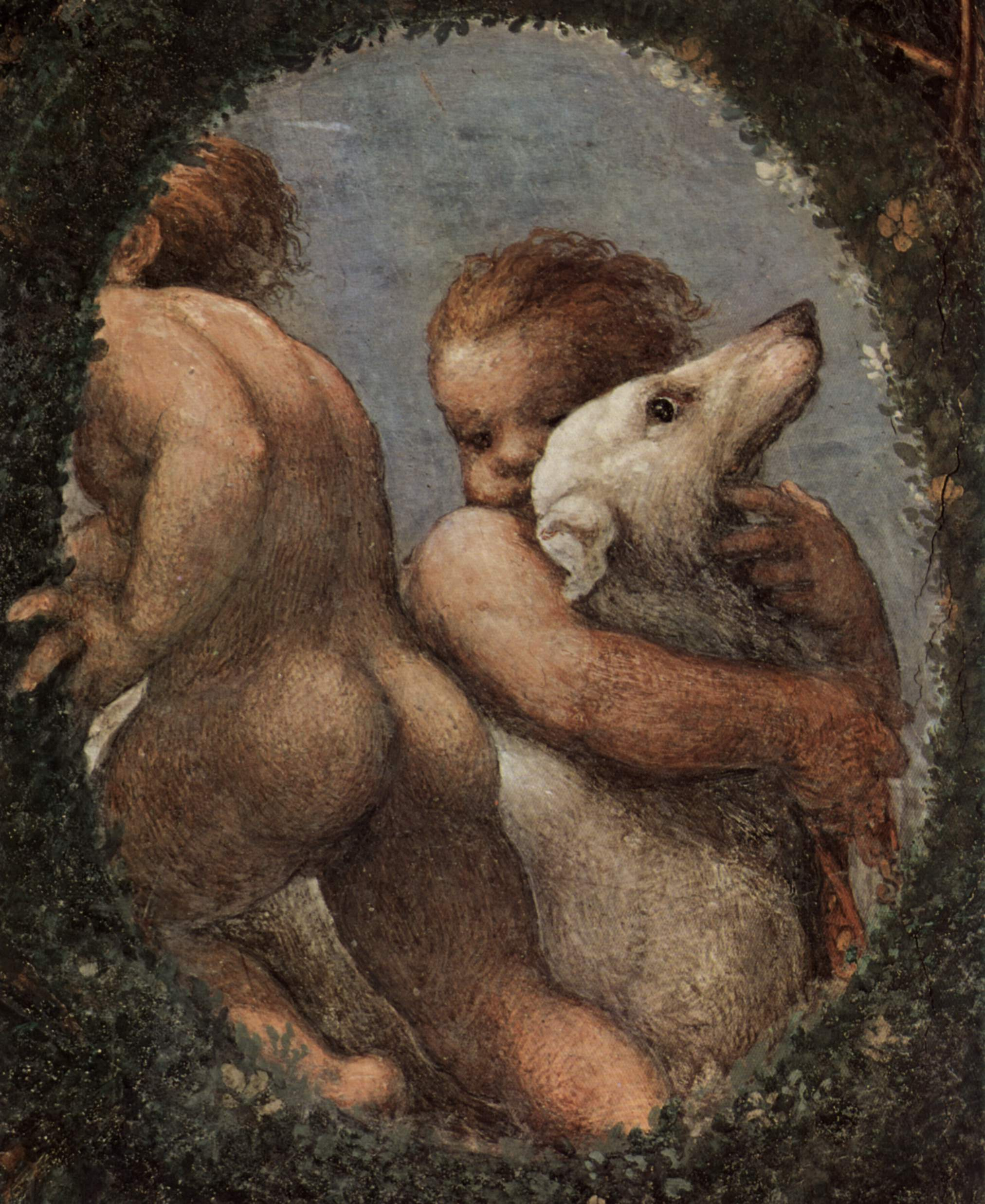
Detail of Correggio's frescoes in the Camera di San Paolo

- Francesco Marmitta, painter
- Filippo Mazzola, painter
- Francesco Mazzola, best known as Il Parmigianino, painter
- Girolamo Mazzola Bedoli, painter
- Giovanni Maria Francesco Rondani, painter
- Bartolomeo Schedoni, painter

=== Others ===
- Vittorio Adorni, cyclist
- Giovanni Amighetti, composer and musician
- Amoretti Brothers, typographers and typefounders, Bodoni's opponents
- Andrea Belicchi, racing driver
- Attilio Bertolucci, poet
- Bernardo Bertolucci, director
- Giuseppe Bertolucci, director
- Giambattista Bodoni, typographer
- Vittorio Bottego, explorer
- Cleofonte Campanini, conductor
- Girolamo Cantelli, politician
- Francesco Cura, actor, singer and model
- Elizabeth Farnese, Queen of Spain
- Odoardo Farnese, duke of Parma
- Alexander Farnese, Duke of Parma, military commander
- Adalgisa Gabbi (1857–1933), opera singer
- Francesco Gabriele Frola, ballet dancer
- Vittorio Gallese, physiologist
- Pietro Gandolfi, racing driver
- Fiorello Giraud, opera singer
- Giovannino Guareschi, writer
- Enzo Magnanini, footballer
- Adriano Malori, cyclist
- Artemio Motta, composer
- Franco Nero, actor
- Antonio Brianti, architect
- Ferdinando Paer, composer
- Niccolò Paganini, composer and musician, buried in Parma
- Renzo Pezzani, poet
- Andrea Rizzoli, racing driver
- Gio Scotti, influencer and model
- Alex Szilasi, pianist
- Arturo Toscanini, conductor
- Paul Yeboah (Bello FiGo), singer
- Giuseppe Verdi, opera composer
- Marcus Thuram, footballer
- Simone Feroci, bassist
- Jerry Torre, footballer
- Sergio Costa, businessman, founder of Costa Coffee

== See also ==
- European College of Parma
- University of Parma
- History of the Duchy of Parma and Piacenza#
