= List of artists in the Metropolitan Museum of Art Guide =

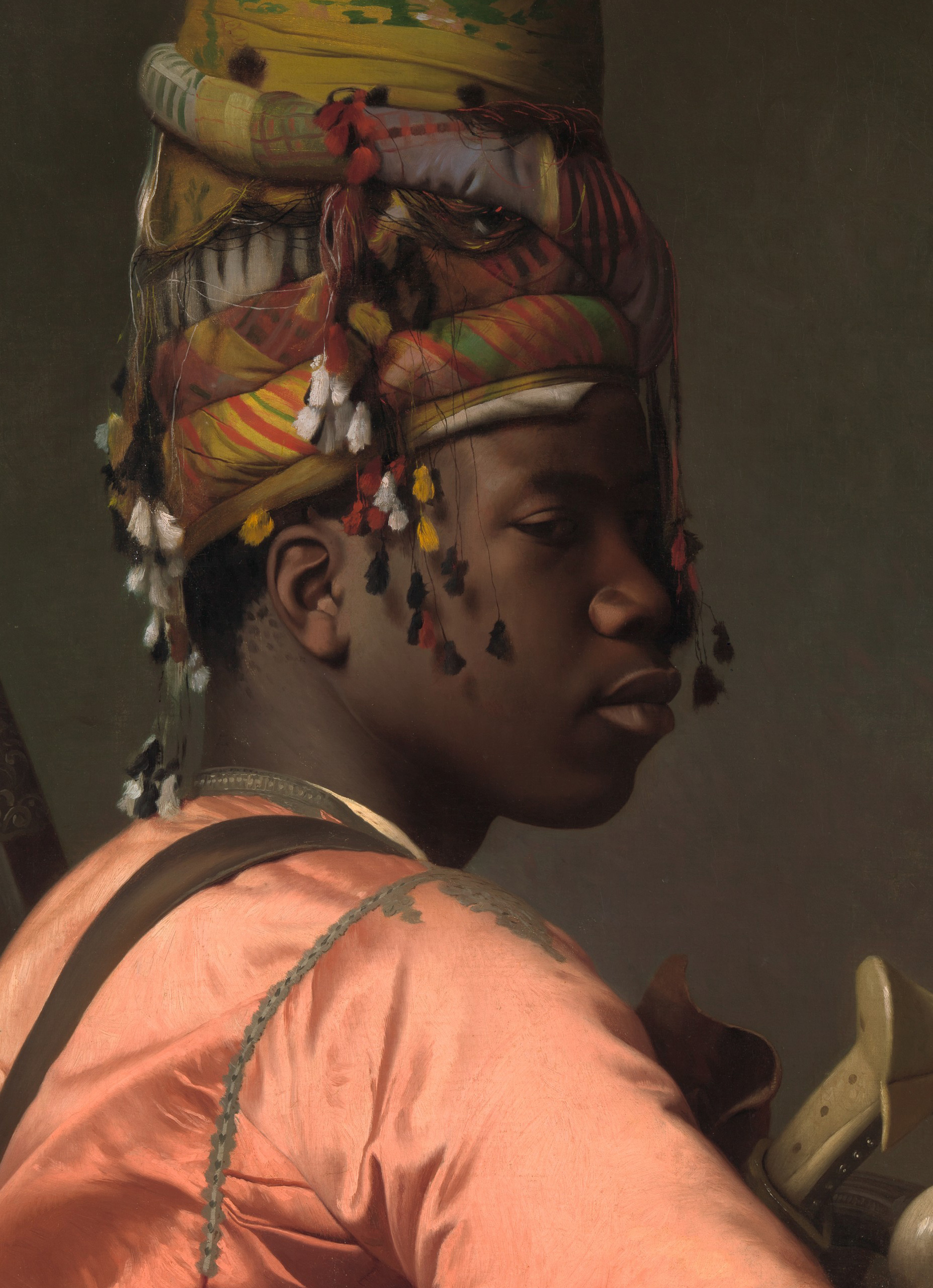
Painting detail for cover of current edition from 2012

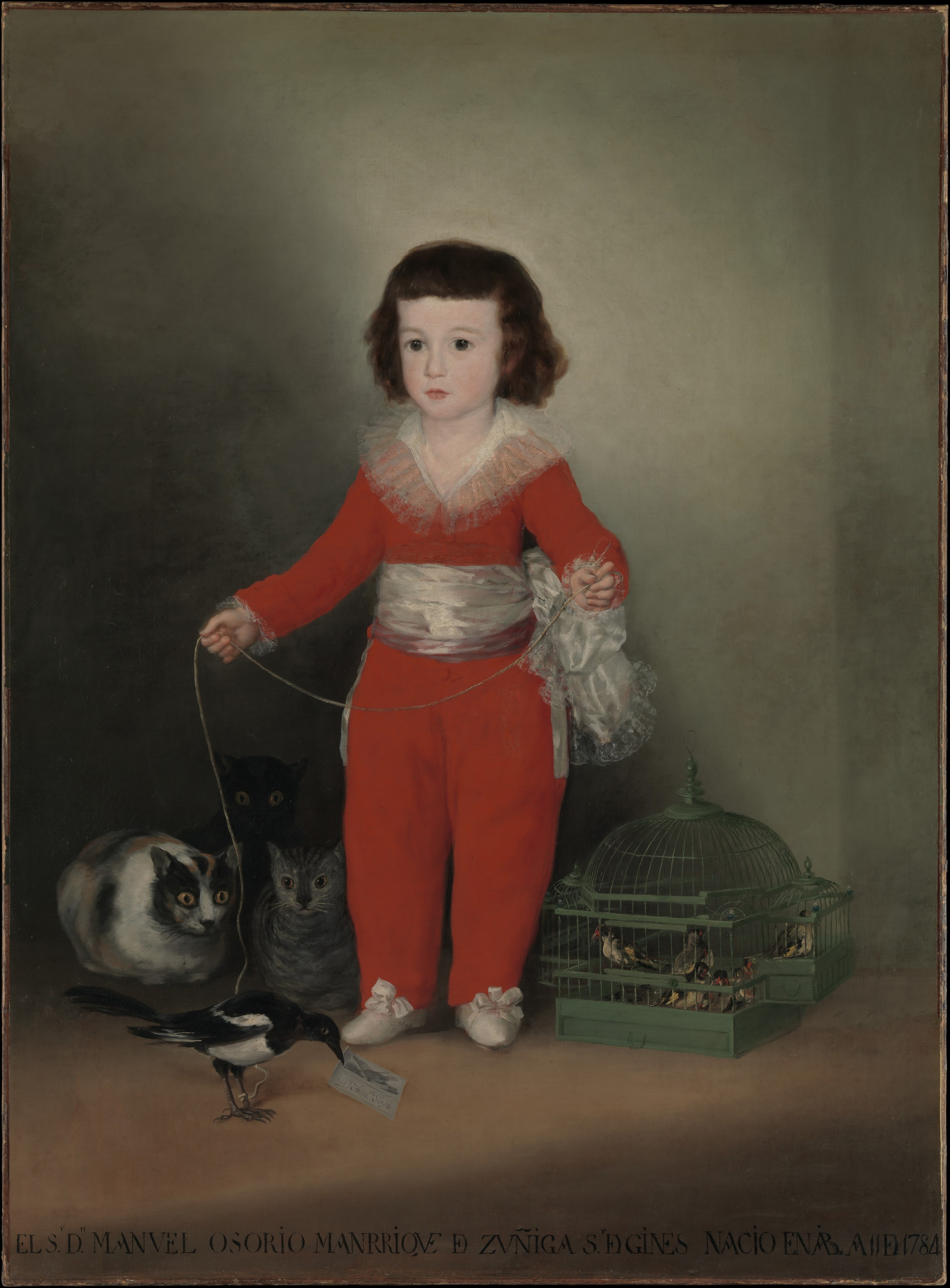
Painting used for the cover of the 1983 paperback edition

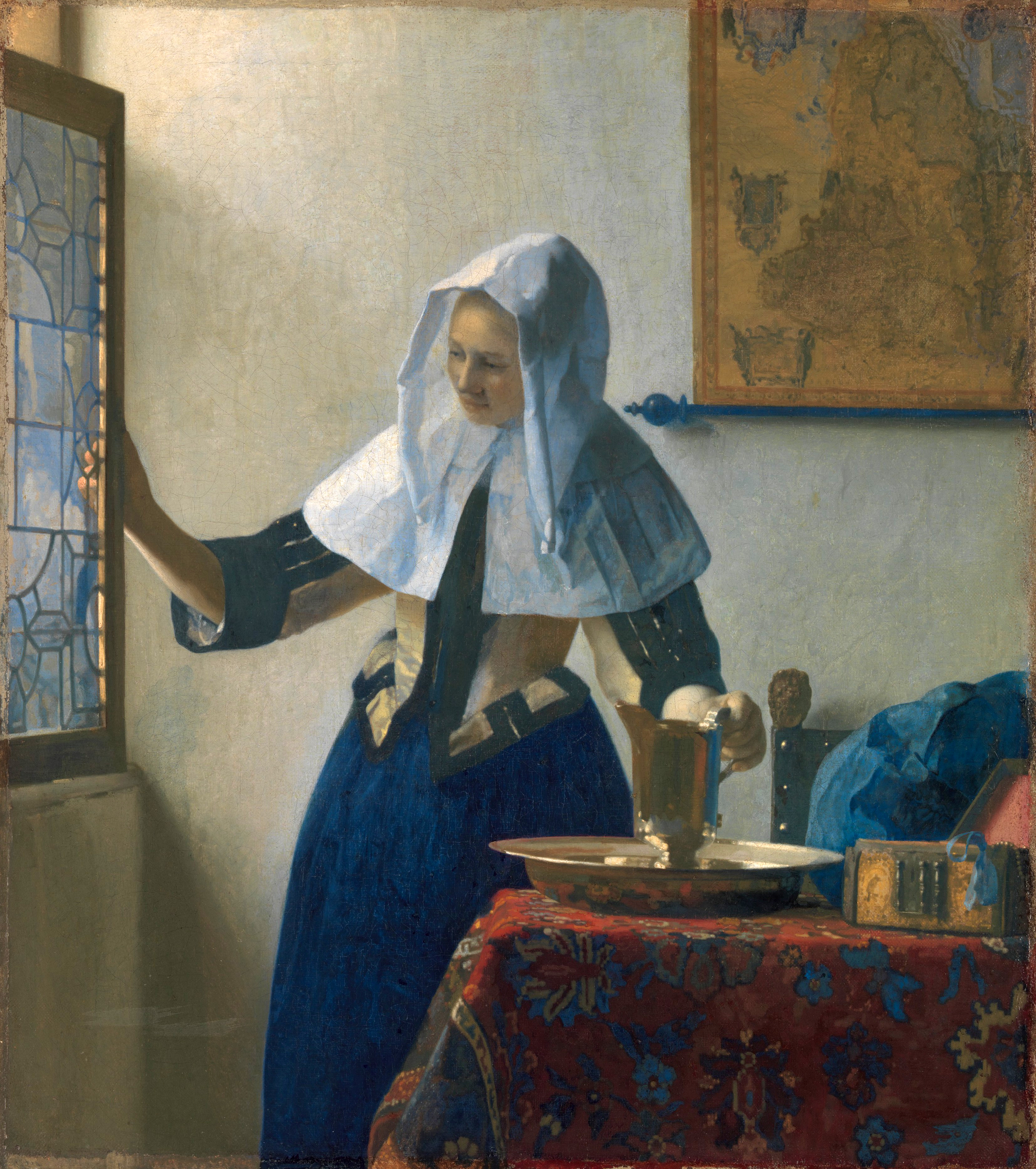
Painting used for the 1983 hardcover edition, and also for the paperback edition of the 1987 "fourth printing" of the 1983 edition

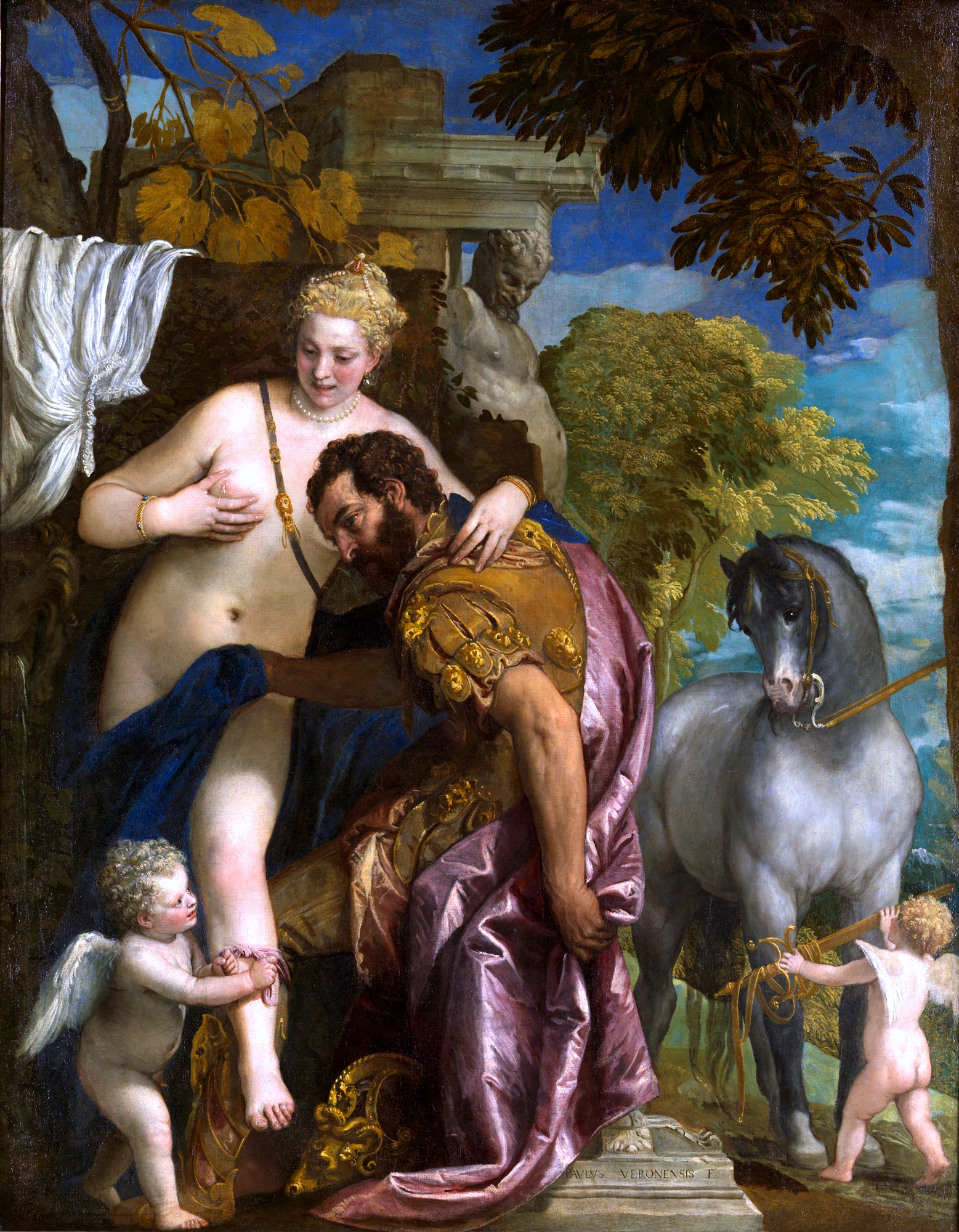
Painting used for the cover of the 2000 third impression of the second edition from 1994

The List of artists in the Metropolitan Museum of Art Guide is a list of the artists indexed in the Metropolitan Museum of Art museum guide. The guide, with a foreword by the museum director Philippe de Montebello, was first produced in 1983 and the edition from 1994 has been digitized.

This guide was a new pocketbook version of the magazine-format guidebook published in 1972 as Guide to The Metropolitan Museum of Art, edited by Nora Beeson during Thomas Hoving's tenure. That guidebook was the first to include fold-out museum maps of the collection wings. This guide, with color illustrations followed by concise descriptions, was updated in 1983 and 1994 as The Metropolitan Museum of Art Guide (edited by Kathleen Howard during Philippe de Montebello tenure), and under the same name in 2012 (edited by Harriet Whelchel, Margaret Aspinwall and Elisa Urbanelli during Thomas P. Campbell tenure).

== Background ==
Montebello claimed that the idea for the guide "to present a profile of the Met in terms of its strengths and weaknesses", came from the museum's senior editor Kathleen Howard in 1978 and took 5 years to make, based on a pocket-sized format inspired by the guidebook from the Germanisches Nationalmuseum of Nuremberg. Montebello drew up a list of 1,200 highlights and these were reconciled with the lists of the curators of the various collection to create 800 objects to be photographed and included. The museum's collections are spread throughout several wings in the Fifth Avenue location in addition to The Cloisters museum and gardens in northern Manhattan. The entire collection houses over two million objects, tens of thousands of which are on view at any given time. The museum guide has been designed to highlight the various major sections based on the importance of their holdings in the "over-all hierarchy of the arts and public response". This explains why European paintings are represented by 87 pages, as opposed to 23 for Egyptian works of art.

In the following list from the index, the artist's name is followed by the location of one of their works and its page number in the guide. For artists with more than one work in the guide, or for works by artists not listed here, see the online guidebook, the Metropolitan Museum of Art website or the corresponding Wikimedia Commons category. Of artists listed, there are only 7 women, including Rosalba Carriera, Mary Cassatt, Louise Bourgeois, Adélaïde Labille-Guiard, Georgia O'Keeffe, Élisabeth Louise Vigée-LeBrun, and Susan Rothenberg. For the complete list of artists and their artworks in the collection, see the website.

- Robert Adam (1728–1792), European sculpture and decorative arts : page 272
- Aert van Tricht (active 1492–1501), The Cloisters : page 411
- Ahmad ibn al–Suhrawardi (1290–1320), Islamic art : page 336
- Leon Battista Alberti (1404–1472), European paintings : page 178
- Albrecht Altdorfer (1480–1538), Drawings and Prints : page 132
- Amasis Painter (549-509 B.C.), Greek & Roman art : page 317
- John Frederick Amelung (1741–1798), American Wing : page 38
- American Chair Company, American Wing : page 40
- Rafael and Gaspar Amezúa, European sculpture and decorative arts : page 301
- Andokides Painter (ca. 530–515/10 B.C.), Greek and Roman art : page 318
- Andrea del Sarto (1486–1530), European paintings : page 174
- Fra Angelico (1387–1455), European paintings : page 177
- Pier Jacopo Alari Bonacolsi (ca. 1460–1528), European sculpture and decorative arts : page 260
- Antonio da Sangallo the Younger (1483–1546), European sculpture and decorative arts : page 261
- Arkesilas Painter (active around 560 BCE), Greek and Roman art : page 316
- Tiziano Aspetti (ca. 1559–1606), European sculpture and decorative arts : page 264
- Milton Avery (1885–1965), 20th-century art : page 445
- Hans Baldung (1484–1545), European paintings : page 190
- Edouard Baldus (1813–1889), Photographs : page 423
- Balthus (1908–2001), Robert Lehman collection : page 362
- Baccio Bandinelli (1493–1560), European sculpture and decorative arts : page 262
- Angelo Barovieri (died 1480), European sculpture and decorative arts : page 298
- Joseph B. Barry and Son, American Wing : page 39
- Antoine-Louis Barye (1796–1875), European sculpture and decorative arts : page 269
- Georg Baselitz (b.1938), 20th-century art : page 453
- Jules Bastien-Lepage (1848–1884), European paintings : page 241
- Pompeo Batoni (1708–1787), European paintings : page 181
- Max Beckmann (1884–1950), 20th-century art : page 443
- Bartolomeo Bellano (1437–1496), European sculpture and decorative arts : page 259
- Giovanni Bellini (1435–1516), European paintings : page 183
- John Henry Belter (1804–1863), American Wing : page 40
- Massimiliano Soldani Benzi (1656–1740), European sculpture and decorative arts : page 293
- Berlin Painter (ca. 500–475 B.C.), Greek and Roman art : page 320
- Berlinghiero Berlinghieri (1175–1236), European paintings : page 170
- Émile Bernard (1868–1941), European paintings : page 253
- Gian Lorenzo Bernini (1598–1680), European sculpture and decorative arts : page 264
- Martin Guillaume Biennais (1764–1843), European sculpture and decorative arts : page 278
- Albert Bierstadt (1830–1902), American Wing : page 22
- George Caleb Bingham (1811–1879), American Wing : page 20
- Etienne Bobillet (active in Bourges, 1453), Medieval art : page 389
- Umberto Boccioni (1882–1916), 20th-century art : page 454
- Arnold Böcklin (1827–1901), European paintings : page 219
- Giambologna (ca. 1524–1608), European sculpture and decorative arts : page 262
- Rosa Bonheur (1822–1899), European paintings : page 239
- Pierre Bonnard (1867–1947), Robert Lehman collection : page 361
- Gerard ter Borch (1617–1681), European paintings : page 211
- Sandro Botticelli (1444–1510), European paintings : page 172
- François Boucher (1703–1770), European paintings : page 230
- Andre–Charles Boulle (1642–1732), European sculpture and decorative arts : page 273
- Louise Bourgeois (1911–2010), 20th-century art : page 458
- Nicolas Noël Boutet (1761–1833), Arms and Armour : page 67
- Dieric Bouts (1415–1475), European paintings : page 200
- Jean Brandely (active 1855–67), European sculpture and decorative arts : page 274
- Edgar Brandt (1880–1960), 20th-century art : page 462
- Georges Braque (1882–1963), 20th-century art : page 438
- Bartholomeus Breenbergh (1598–1657), European paintings : page 208
- Marcel Breuer (1902–1981), 20th-century art : page 465
- Bronzino (1503–1572), European paintings : page 175
- Pieter Bruegel the Elder (1526–1569), European paintings : page 204
- Hendrick ter Brugghen (1588–1629), European paintings : page 208
- Gaspero Bruschi (1710–1780), European sculpture and decorative arts : page 293
- Buli Master, Oceania and Americas : page 79
- Franz Anton Bustelli (1723–1763), European sculpture and decorative arts : page 297
- Alexander Milne Calder (1846–1923), 20th-century art : page 456
- Jean de Cambrai (died 1438), Medieval art : page 389
- Robert Campin (1375–1444), The Cloisters : page 405
- Canaletto (1697–1768), European paintings : page 188
- Antonio Canova (1757–1822), European sculpture and decorative arts : page 265
- Martin Carlin (ca. 1730–1785), European sculpture and decorative arts : page 276
- Fra Carnevale (ca. 1425–1484), European paintings : page 178
- Anthony Caro (1920–1939), 20th-century art : page 459
- Vittore Carpaccio (1465–1527), European paintings : page 183
- Jean-Baptiste Carpeaux (1827–1875), European sculpture and decorative arts : page 269
- Annibale Carracci (1560–1609), Drawings and Prints : page 135
- Mary Cassatt (1844–1926), Drawings and Prints : page 143
- Paul Cézanne (1839–1906), European paintings : page 246
- Charles-Michel-Ange Challe (1718–1778), Drawings and Prints : page 139
- Chantilly porcelain, European sculpture and decorative arts : page 294
- Chao Meng-fu, Asian art : page 113
- Jean-Baptiste-Siméon Chardin (1699–1779), European paintings : page 197
- William Merritt Chase (1849–1916), American Wing : page 29
- Ch'ien Tsuen, Asian art : page 112
- Petrus Christus (1415–1476), European paintings : page 199
- Frederic Edwin Church (1826–1900), American Wing : page 22
- Claude Lorrain (1604–1682), Drawings and Prints : page 134
- Claus de Werve (ca. 1380–1439), Medieval art : page 390
- Clodion (1738–1814), European sculpture and decorative arts : page 268
- Chuck Close (b.1940), 20th-century art : page 451
- Jean Clouet (1480–1541), European paintings : page 224
- John Cobb (ca. 1715-1778), European sculpture and decorative arts : page 271
- Thomas Cole (1801–1848), American Wing : page 21
- Samuel Colt (1814–1862), Arms and Armour : page 68
- John Constable (1776–1837), European paintings : page 223
- Hans Coper (1920–1981), 20th-century art : page 463
- John Singleton Copley (1738–1815), American Wing : page 18
- Jean-Baptiste-Camille Corot (1796–1875), European paintings : page 236
- Antonio da Correggio (1489–1534), European paintings : page 190
- Gustave Courbet (1819–1877), European paintings : page 238
- Jean Cousin the Elder (1490–1570), European sculpture and decorative arts : page 284
- James Cox (inventor) (1723–1800), European sculpture and decorative arts : page 287
- Lucas Cranach the Elder (1472–1553), European paintings : page 217
- Bartolomeo Cristofori (1655–1731), Musical instruments : page 417
- Carlo Crivelli (1430/35–1495), European paintings : page 182
- Aelbert Cuyp (1620–1691), European paintings : page 212
- Bernardo Daddi (ca. 1280–1348), Robert Lehman collection : page 348
- Louis Daguerre (1787–1851), Photographs : page 423
- Damiano da Bergamo (ca. 1480–1549), European sculpture and decorative arts : page 280
- Honoré Daumier (1808–1879), European paintings : page 237
- Gerard David (1460–1523), European paintings : page 202
- Jacques-Louis David (1748–1825), European paintings : page 232
- Stuart Davis (painter) (1894–1964), 20th-century art : page 444
- John Henry Dearle (1860–1932), European sculpture and decorative arts : page 286
- Joseph-Théodore Deck (1823–1891), European sculpture and decorative arts : page 292
- Edgar Degas (1834–1917), European paintings : page 244
- Willem de Kooning (1904–1997), 20th-century art : page 446
- Eugène Delacroix (1798–1863), European paintings : page 236
- Étienne Delaune (1518–1583), European sculpture and decorative arts : page 292
- Charles Demuth (1883–1935), 20th-century art : page 441
- Thomas Dennis (1638–1706), American Wing : page 34
- André Derain (1880–1954), Robert Lehman collection : page 360
- Richard Diebenkorn (1922–1993), 20th-century art : page 448
- Charles-Guillaume Diehl (active 1811–ca. 1885), European sculpture and decorative arts : page 274
- Otto Dix (1891–1969), 20th-century art : page 440
- Gaspare Diziani (1689–1767), European sculpture and decorative arts : page 281
- Domenichino (1581–1641), European paintings : page 193
- Christian Dorflinger (1828–1915), American Wing : page 40
- Jean-Claude Chambellan Duplessis (1699–1774), European sculpture and decorative arts : page 294
- Albrecht Dürer (1471–1528), European paintings : page 217
- Anthony van Dyck (1599–1641), European paintings : page 207
- Thomas Eakins (1844–1916), Photographs : page 424
- Ralph Earl (1751–1801), American Wing : page 18
- Gerhard Emmoser (died 1584), European sculpture and decorative arts : page 288
- Epiktetos (ca. 520–490 B.C.), Greek and Roman art : page 319
- Euthymides (active 515-500 B.C.), Greek and Roman art : page 320
- Euxitheos (6th century B.C.), Greek and Roman art : page 319
- William Evans (landscape painter) (1798–1877), Photographs : page 426
- Exekias (active 540–520 B.C.), Greek and Roman art : page 318
- Jan van Eyck (1370–1441), European paintings : page 198
- Henri Fantin-Latour (1836–1904), European paintings : page 242
- John Flannagan (sculptor) (1895–1942), 20th-century art : page 454
- Fletcher & Gardiner, American Wing : page 39
- Giambattista Foggini (1652–1725), European sculpture and decorative arts : page 265
- Jean Fouquet (ca. 1420–ca. 1480), Robert Lehman collection : page 354
- Alexandre-Évariste Fragonard (1780–1850), European sculpture and decorative arts : page 295
- Jean-Honoré Fragonard (1732–1806), European paintings : page 231
- Francesco di Giorgio (1439–1502), European sculpture and decorative arts : page 280
- Francesco Marmitta (ca. 1460–ca. 1504), Robert Lehman collection : page 352
- Emmanuel Frémiet (1824–1910), European sculpture and decorative arts : page 274
- Jean Frémin (1738–1786), European sculpture and decorative arts : page 287
- Daniel Chester French (1850–1931), American Wing : page 32
- Lucian Freud (1922–2011), 20th-century art : page 453
- Joachim Fries (1579–1620), European sculpture and decorative arts : page 290
- Antonello Gagini (1477–1535), European sculpture and decorative arts : page 260
- Eugène Gaillard (1862–1933), 20th-century art : page 462
- Thomas Gainsborough (1727–1788), European paintings : page 221
- Paul Gauguin (1848–1903), European paintings : page 251
- François-Thomas Germain (1726–1791), European sculpture and decorative arts : page 288
- Domenico Ghirlandaio (1449–1494), European paintings : page 173
- Michele Giambono (ca. 1400–ca. 1462), European paintings : page 182
- Carlo Ginori (1702–1757), European sculpture and decorative arts : page 293
- Giotto (1266–1337), European paintings : page 170
- Giovanni di Paolo (1403–1482), European paintings : page 177
- William Glasby (1863–1941), European sculpture and decorative arts : page 301
- Hugo van der Goes (1440–1482), European paintings : page 201
- Vincent van Gogh (1853–1890), European paintings : page 251
- Hendrik Goltzius (1558–1617), Drawings and Prints : page 136
- Julio González (sculptor) (1876–1942), 20th-century art : page 458
- Gorham Manufacturing Co., American Wing : page 42
- Arshile Gorky (1904–1948), 20th-century art : page 445
- Francisco Goya (1746–1828), European paintings : page 197
- El Greco (1541–1614), European paintings : page 194
- Greenpoint Flint Glassworks, American Wing : page 40
- Jean-Baptiste Greuze (1725–1805), European paintings : page 230
- Grueby Faience Company, American Wing : page 42
- Francesco Guardi (1712–1793), European paintings : page 188
- Guercino (1591–1666), European paintings : page 193
- Johann Wilhelm Haas (1698–1764), Musical instruments : page 415
- Habib Allah, Islamic art : page 341
- Jakob Halder (active 1576–1608), Arms and Armour : page 66
- Frans Hals (1582–1666), European paintings : page 208
- Han Kan, Asian art : page 110
- William Harnett (1848–1892), American Wing : page 25
- Marsden Hartley (1877–1943), 20th-century art : page 437
- Rufus Hathaway (1770–1822), American Wing : page 18
- Josiah Johnson Hawes (1808–1901), Photographs : page 423
- Martin Johnson Heade (1819–1904), American Wing : page 23
- Albert Herter (1871–1950), American Wing : page 41
- Hishikawa Morunobu (1618–1694), Asian art : page 99
- Meindert Hobbema (1638–1709), European paintings : page 216
- Hochst, European sculpture and decorative arts : page 297
- David Hockney (b.1937), 20th-century art : page 452
- Franz Caspar Hofer, Musical instruments : page 415
- Josef Hoffmann (1870–1956), 20th-century art : page 464
- William Hogarth (1697–1764), European paintings : page 220
- Hans Holbein the Younger (1497–1543), European paintings : page 218
- Winslow Homer (1836–1910), American Wing : page 23
- Pieter de Hooch (1629–1683), European paintings : page 214
- Edward Hopper (1882–1967), 20th-century art : page 444
- Jean Antoine Houdon (1741–1828), European sculpture and decorative arts : page 267
- Emperor Huizong of Song (1082–1135), Asian art : page 111
- Hung-jen (601-674 A.D.), Asian art : page 115
- Imperial Porcelain Factory, European sculpture and decorative arts : page 297
- Jean Auguste Dominique Ingres (1780–1867), European paintings : page 235
- Ishiguro Msayoshi, Arms & Armour : page 71
- François–Honoré–George Jacob–Desmalter (1770–1841), European sculpture and decorative arts : page 278
- Georges Jacob (1739–1814), European sculpture and decorative arts : page 277
- Jacometto Veneziano (active 1472–1497), Robert Lehman collection : page 352
- Maurice Jacques, European sculpture and decorative arts : page 272
- Wenzel Jamnitzer (ca. 1507–1585), European sculpture and decorative arts : page 289
- Justus van Gent (1430–1490), European paintings : page 201
- Jacob Jordaens (1593–1678), European paintings : page 206
- Gilles Joubert (1689–1775), European sculpture and decorative arts : page 275
- Juan de Flandes (1465–1519), European paintings : page 203
- Wassily Kandinsky (1866–1944), 20th-century art : page 434
- Johann Joachim Kändler (1706–1785), European sculpture and decorative arts : page 296
- Kano Sansetsu (1589–1651), Asian art : page 96
- Ellsworth Kelly (1923–2015), 20th-century art : page 449
- Cornelius Kierstede (1674–1757), American Wing : page 34
- Paul Klee (1879–1940), 20th-century art : page 461
- Johann Köhler (1684–1755), European sculpture and decorative arts : page 278
- Oskar Kokoschka (1886–1980), 20th-century art : page 461
- Philips Koninck (1619–1688), European paintings : page 212
- Johann Joachim Kretzschmar (1677–1740), European sculpture and decorative arts : page 296
- Jakob Kuntz, Arms & Armour : page 68
- Kuo Hsi (c. 1020 - c. 1090), Asian art : page 111
- Roger de La Fresnaye (1885–1925), 20th-century art : page 436
- Adélaïde Labille-Guiard (1749–1803), European paintings : page 234
- Dominick Labino (1910–1987), 20th-century art : page 463
- Gaston Lachaise (1882–1935), 20th-century art : page 455
- Charles-Honoré Lannuier (1779–1819), American Wing : page 38
- Georges de La Tour (1593–1652), European paintings : page 224
- Thomas Lawrence (1769–1830), European paintings : page 222
- Pierre Le Bourgeois (died 1627), Arms and Armour : page 67
- Charles Le Brun (1619–1690), European sculpture and decorative arts : page 284
- Henri le Secq (1818–1882), Photographs : page 422
- Fernand Léger (1881–1955), 20th-century art : page 450
- Jean-Baptiste Lemoyne (1704–1778), European sculpture and decorative arts : page 266
- Jean-Louis Lemoyne (1665–1755), European sculpture and decorative arts : page 267
- Leonardo da Vinci (1452–1519), European paintings : page 215
- Louis Alphonse Letellier (1780–1830), European sculpture and decorative arts : page 275
- Emanuel Leutze (1816–1868), American Wing : page 24
- Roy Lichtenstein (1923–1997), 20th-century art : page 450
- Limbourg brothers (1385–1416), The Cloisters : page 405
- Léonard Limosin (ca. 1505–ca. 1575), European sculpture and decorative arts : page 290
- Filippo Lippi (1406–1469), European paintings : page 171
- Kunz Lochner (1510–1567), Arms and Armour : page 64
- Tullio Lombardo (ca. 1460–1532), European sculpture and decorative arts : page 260
- Battista di Domenico Lorenzi (ca. 1527–1592), European sculpture and decorative arts : page 263
- Lorenzo De Ferrari (1680–1744), European sculpture and decorative arts : page 282
- Lorenzo Monaco (1370–1423), Robert Lehman collection : page 349
- Lydos (ca. 565–535 B.C.), Greek and Roman art : page 317
- Corneille de Lyon (1505–1575), European sculpture and decorative arts : page 290
- Charles Rennie Mackintosh (1868–1928), 20th-century art : page 464
- Frederick William MacMonnies (1863–1937), American Wing : page 33
- Nicolaes Maes (1634–1693), European paintings : page 216
- Aristide Maillol (1861–1944), European sculpture and decorative arts : page 270
- Édouard Manet (1832–1883), European paintings : page 239
- Andrea Mantegna (1430–1506), Drawings and Prints : page 130
- Master Biduinus, The Cloisters : page 396
- Jean Hey (1471–1500), Robert Lehman collection : page 354
- Master of the Codex of Saint George (active first half of the 14th century–), The Cloisters : page 403
- Master of the Life of Saint John the Baptist (1325–1350), Robert Lehman collection : page 349
- Henri Matisse (1869–1954), Robert Lehman collection : page 360
- Carpoforo Mazetti (1685–1743), European sculpture and decorative arts : page 281
- Meissen porcelain, European sculpture and decorative arts : page 296
- Johann Peter Melchior (1747–1825), European sculpture and decorative arts : page 297
- Luis Egidio Meléndez (1716–1780), European paintings : page 197
- Hans Memling (1430–1494), European paintings : page 201
- Michelangelo (1475–1564), European sculpture and decorative arts : page 261
- Michelino da Besozzo (ca. 1400–1450), European paintings : page 189
- Nicola Michetti (1675–1759), European sculpture and decorative arts : page 281
- Jean-François Millet (1814–1875), European paintings : page 238
- Ferdinand Miseroni (1639–1684), European sculpture and decorative arts : page 300
- László Moholy-Nagy (1895–1946), Photographs : page 426
- Claude Monet (1840–1926), European paintings : page 248
- Pierre Etienne Monnot (1657–1733), European sculpture and decorative arts : page 266
- Juan Martínez Montañés (1568–1649), European sculpture and decorative arts : page 266
- Henry Moore (painter) (1831–1895), 20th-century art : page 456
- Gustave Moreau (1826–1898), European paintings : page 240
- Moretto da Brescia (ca. 1498–1554), European paintings : page 191
- James Morisset (1780–1852), Arms & Armour : page 67
- Giovanni Battista Moroni (1525–1578), European paintings : page 191
- Simone Mosca (1492–1553), European sculpture and decorative arts : page 261
- Kolomon Moser (1868–1918), 20th-century art : page 464
- Paul de Mosselman (active in Bourges, 1453), Medieval art : page 389
- Bartolomé Esteban Murillo (1617–1682), European paintings : page 196
- Naotane, Arms and Armour : page 71
- Filippo Negroli (1525–1551), Arms and Armour : page 63
- Jacques Neilson (1718–1788), European sculpture and decorative arts : page 272
- New Bremen Glass manufactory, American Wing : page 38
- Nikias (499-412 B.C.), Greek and Roman art : page 317
- Ni Tsan (1301–1374), Asian art : page 113
- Isamu Noguchi (1904–1988), 20th-century art : page 457
- Emil Nolde (1867–1956), 20th-century art : page 443
- Jean Baptiste Claude Odiot (1763–1850), European sculpture and decorative arts : page 289
- Jean Francois Oeben (1721–1763), European sculpture and decorative arts : page 274
- Korin Ogata (1658–1716), Asian art : page 96
- Georgia O'Keeffe (1887–1986), 20th-century art : page 441
- Giovanni Orello (1486–1572), European sculpture and decorative arts : page 277
- Bernard van Orley (1490–1541), Robert Lehman collection : page 365
- Master of the Osservanza Triptych (1430–1450), Robert Lehman collection : page 350
- Erastus Dow Palmer (1817–1904), American Wing : page 31
- Pieter de Pannemaker (fl. 1517–35), Robert Lehman collection : page 365
- Willem de Pannemaker (1512–1581), European sculpture and decorative arts : page 282
- Simon Pantin (1680–1728), European sculpture and decorative arts : page 291
- Paolo di Giovanni Fei (ca. 1345–ca. 1411), European paintings : page 176
- Claudius du Paquier (1679–1751), European sculpture and decorative arts : page 295
- Jean-Baptiste Pater (1695–1736), European paintings : page 229
- Joachim Patinir (1480–1524), European paintings : page 203
- James Peale (1749–1831), American Wing : page 21
- Peter Peck (1500/10–1596), Arms and Armour : page 64
- Nicola Pellipario (1480–1538), European sculpture and decorative arts : page 292
- Penthesilea Painter (active ca. 460–ca. 440 B.C.), Greek & Roman art : page 321
- Perchtold, The Cloisters : page 408
- Charles Percier (1764–1838), European sculpture and decorative arts : page 278
- Pietro Perugino (1446–1523), European paintings : page 178
- Francesco Pesellino (1422–1457), European paintings : page 172
- Duncan Phyfe (1770–1854), American Wing : page 38
- Giovanni Battista Piazzetta (1682–1754), Drawings & Prints : page 139
- Pablo Picasso (1881–1973), 20th-century art : page 430
- Piero della Francesca (ca. 1416/1417–1492), Robert Lehman collection : page 362
- Piero di Cosimo (1462–1521), European paintings : page 173
- Emile Pingat & Cie., Costume Institute : page 125
- Giovanni Battista Piranesi (1720–1778), Drawings & Prints : page 139
- Giovanni Pisano (1245–1314), Medieval art : page 384
- Camille Pissarro (1830–1903), European paintings : page 241
- Giambattista Pittoni (1687–1767), European paintings, 18th-century art
- Antonio del Pollaiuolo (1433–1498), Robert Lehman collection : page 364
- Jackson Pollock (1912–1956), 20th-century art : page 446
- Baccio Pontelli (c. 1450–1492), European sculpture and decorative arts : page 280
- Frans Post (1612–1680), European paintings : page 211
- Nicolas Poussin (1594–1665), European paintings : page 226
- Matthew Pratt (1734–1805), American Wing : page 19
- Maurice Prendergast (1859–1924), Robert Lehman collection : page 369
- Mattia Preti (1613–1699), European paintings : page 181
- Jean Pucelle (ca. 1300–1355), The Cloisters : page 402
- Paco Rabanne (b.1934), Costume Institute : page 127
- Jean Dominique Rachette (1744–1809), European sculpture and decorative arts : page 297
- Raphael (1483–1520), European paintings : page 222
- Odilon Redon (1840–1916), Robert Lehman collection : page 369
- Rembrandt (1606–1669), European paintings : page 216
- Frederic Remington (1861–1909), American Wing : page 33
- Guido Reni (1575–1642), European paintings : page 192
- Pierre-Auguste Renoir (1841–1919), European paintings : page 248
- Joshua Reynolds (1723–1792), European paintings : page 220
- Jusepe de Ribera (1590–1656), European paintings : page 196
- Il Riccio (ca. 1460–1532), European sculpture and decorative arts : page 261
- Tilman Riemenschneider (ca. 1460–1531), The Cloisters : page 409
- Léon Riesener (1767–1805), European sculpture and decorative arts : page 278
- Bernard II van Risamburgh (1700–1760), European sculpture and decorative arts : page 274
- Andrea della Robbia (1435–1525), European sculpture and decorative arts : page 258
- Luca della Robbia (1399–1482), European sculpture and decorative arts : page 258
- Auguste Rodin (1840–1917), European sculpture and decorative arts : page 270
- David Roentgen (1743–1807), European sculpture and decorative arts : page 279
- Rogier van der Weyden (1400–1464), European paintings : page 199
- Salvator Rosa (1615–1673), European paintings : page 181
- James Rosenquist (1933–2017), 20th-century art : page 450
- Antonio Rosselino (1427–1479), European sculpture and decorative arts : page 258
- Susan Rothenberg (1945–2020), 20th-century art : page 452
- Henri Rousseau (1844–1910), 20th-century art : page 432
- Théodore Rousseau (1812–1867), European paintings : page 237
- Pierre Noël Rousset (1715–1795), European sculpture and decorative arts : page 275
- Alexander Roux (1813–1886), American Wing : page 41
- Gobelins Manufactory, European sculpture and decorative arts : page 272
- Peter Paul Rubens (1577–1640), European paintings : page 204
- Hans Ruckers the Elder (1545–1598), Musical instruments : page 416
- Emile Jacques Ruhlmann (1879–1933), 20th-century art : page 465
- Jacob Isaacksz van Ruisdael (1628–1682), European paintings : page 213
- Andrea Sacchi (1599–1661), European paintings : page 180
- Augustus Saint-Gaudens (1848–1907), American Wing : page 32
- John Sanderson (died 1774), European sculpture and decorative arts : page 271
- John Singer Sargent (1856–1925), American Wing : page 27
- Stefano di Giovanni (1374–1451), European paintings : page 176
- Charles Joseph Sax (1791–1865), Musical instruments : page 415
- Martino Schedel, Drawings and Prints : page 139
- Israel Scheuch, Arms and Armour : page 65
- William Searle (1871–1944), American Wing : page 34
- Georges Seurat (1859–1891), European paintings : page 252
- Gino Severini (1883–1966), 20th-century art : page 460
- Manufacture nationale de Sèvres (1740–present), European sculpture and decorative arts : page 294
- Charles Sheeler (1883–1965), 20th-century art : page 440
- Antoine Sigalon (1524–1590), European sculpture and decorative arts : page 292
- Paul Signac (1863–1935), European paintings : page 252
- Luca Signorelli (1441–1523), European paintings : page 178
- Simone Martini (1284–1344), European paintings : page 176
- David Smith (sculptor) (1906–1965), 20th-century art : page 458
- William Smith of Warwick (1705–1747), European sculpture and decorative arts : page 271
- Joseph Smith Pottery, American Wing : page 37
- Albert Sands Southworth (1811–1894), Photographs : page 423
- Chaïm Soutine (1893–1943), 20th-century art : page 442
- Abondio Statio, European sculpture and decorative arts : page 281
- Jan Steen (1626–1679), European paintings : page 213
- Edward Steichen (1879–1973), Photographs : page 425
- Clyfford Still (1904–1980), 20th-century art : page 447
- Antonio Stradivari (1644–1737), Musical instruments : page 414
- Paul Strand (1890–1976), Photographs : page 425
- Gilbert Stuart (1755–1828), American Wing : page 20
- George Stubbs (1724–1806), European paintings : page 221
- Sultan-Muhammad (fl. ca. 1505–50) (16th century), Islamic art : page 339
- T'ang Yin (1470–1523), Asian art : page 114
- William Henry Fox Talbot (1800–1877), Photographs : page 422
- Giovanni Battista Tiepolo (1696–1770), European paintings : page 186
- Giovanni Domenico Tiepolo (1727–1804), European paintings : page 187
- Louis Comfort Tiffany (1848–1933), American Wing : page 42
- Tintoretto (1518–1594), European paintings : page 184
- Titian (1485–1576), European paintings : page 184
- Henri de Toulouse-Lautrec (1864–1901), European paintings : page 255
- John Trumbull (1756–1843), American Wing : page 19
- Cosimo Tura (ca. 1430–1495), European paintings : page 189
- J. M. W. Turner (1775–1851), European paintings : page 223
- John Henry Twachtman (1853–1902), American Wing : page 28
- Cy Twombly (1928–2011), 20th-century art : page 448
- Ugolino di Nerio (1295–1347), Robert Lehman collection : page 348
- Umbo (1902–1980), Photographs : page 426
- Giovanni Maria Vasaro, Robert Lehman collection : page 363
- Diego Velázquez (1599–1660), European paintings : page 196
- Johannes Vermeer (1632–1675), European paintings : page 214
- Paolo Veronese (1528–1588), European paintings : page 185
- Louise Élisabeth Vigée Le Brun (1755–1842), European paintings : page 234
- Giacomo da Vignola (1507–1573), European sculpture and decorative arts : page 262
- William Vile (c. 1700–1767), European sculpture and decorative arts : page 271
- Jacques Villon (1875–1963), 20th-century art : page 434
- Carl von Scheidt, European sculpture and decorative arts : page 298
- William Guy Wall (1792–1864), American Wing : page 29
- Wang Hui (Qing dynasty) (1632–1717), Asian art : page 116
- John Quincy Adams Ward (1830–1910), American Wing : page 31
- Thomas Warren (1727–1767), American Wing : page 40
- Waste Basket Boutique, Costume Institute : page 127
- Carleton Watkins (1829–1916), Photographs : page 424
- Jean-Antoine Watteau (1684–1721), European paintings : page 221
- Niclaus Weckmann (c. 1481–1526), Medieval art : page 391
- James McNeill Whistler (1834–1903), American Wing : page 28
- Joseph Willems (ca. 1715-1766), European sculpture and decorative arts : page 295
- Garry Winogrand (1928–1984), Photographs : page 427
- John Wootton (ca. 1682–1764), European sculpture and decorative arts : page 271
- Charles Frederick Worth (1825–1895), Costume Institute : page 126
- Frank Lloyd Wright (1867–1959), American Wing : page 43
- Peter Young (pewter) (1749–1813), American Wing : page 37
- Taddeo Zuccari (1529–1566), Robert Lehman collection : page 366
