= Mazzola (surname) =

Mazzola (pronounced [matˈtsɔːla]) is an Italian surname. Notable people with the surname include:

- Alessandro Mazzola (born 1969), Italian footballer
- Alessandro Mazzola (painter) (1533–1608), Italian painter
- Anna Mazzola (born 1978), British author
- Brianna Mazzola (born 2000), American singer, actress and dancer
- Caterino Mazzolà (1745–1806), Italian poet and librettist
- Denia Mazzola (born 1953), Italian operatic soprano
- Enrico Mazzola (born 1944), Italian footballer
- Enrique Mazzola, Spanish-Italian conductor
- Ferruccio Mazzola (1945–2013), Italian footballer
- Filippo Mazzola (1460–1505), Italian painter
- Francesco Mazzola (1503–1540), known as Parmigianino, Italian painter
- Frank Mazzola (1935–2015), American film actor and editor
- Girolamo Mazzola Bedoli (1500–1569), Italian painter
- Giuseppe Mazzola (1748–1838), Italian painter
- Guerino Mazzola (born 1947), Swiss mathematician
- Joey Mazzola (born 1961), American guitarist and songwriter
- José Altafini (born 1938), Brazilian footballer who played under the name Mazzola
- Mario Mazzola (born 1946), Italian-American engineer and technology executive
- Marissa Mazzola-McMahon (born 1970), American film producer
- Nicolás Mazzola (born 1990), Argentine footballer
- Rocco Mazzola (born 2005), Italian racing driver
- Rosario Mazzola (1924–2018), Italian Roman Catholic prelate
- Sandro Mazzola (1942–2026), Italian footballer
- Silvio Mazzola (born 1960), Swiss television writer
- Simone Mazzola (born 1996), Italian motorcycle racer
- Valentino Mazzola (1919–1949), Italian footballer
- Valerio Mazzola (born 1988), Italian basketball player
