= Holy Family with Angels =

Holy Family with Angels is the name of the following paintings:

- Holy Family with Angels (Parmigianino), a c. 1524 oil-on-panel painting by Parmigianino
- Holy Family with Angels (Rembrandt), a 1645 oil painting by Rembrandt
