= Portrait of Charles V =

Portrait of Charles V may refer to one of several works by Titian:

- Portrait of Charles V (Titian, Munich), Alte Pinakothek
- Portrait of Charles V (Titian, Naples), Museo di Capodimonte
- Portrait of Charles V with a Dog, Prado, Madrid
- Equestrian Portrait of Charles V, Prado, Madrid
