= Portrait of Charles V (Titian, Naples) =

Painting by Titian

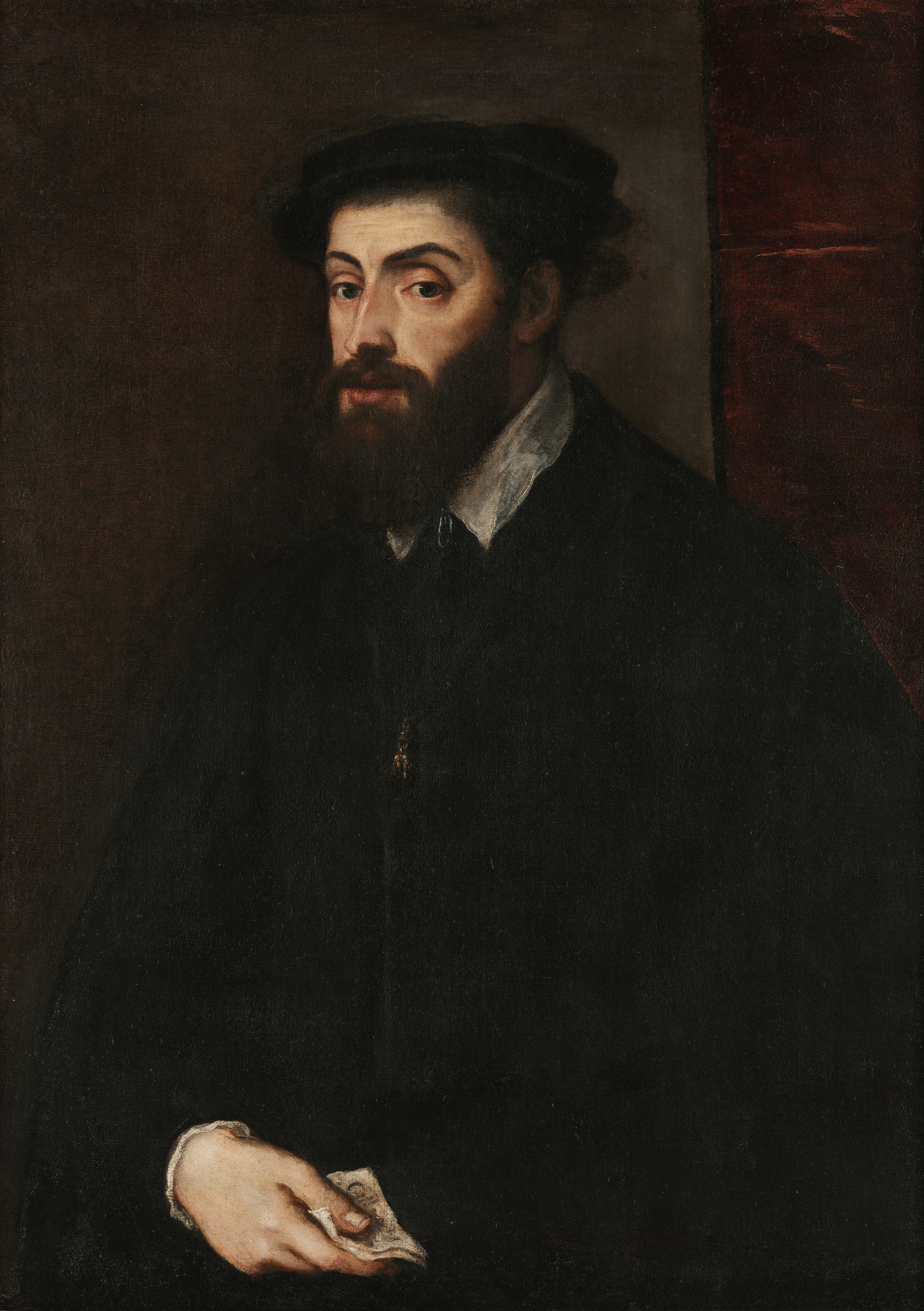
- Artist: Titian
- Year: c. 1549
- Medium: oil on canvas
- Dimensions: 98 cm × 71 cm (39 in × 28 in)
- Location: Museo di Capodimonte, Naples

Portrait of Charles V or Portrait of a Man Wearing the Order of the Golden Fleece is an oil on canvas painting by Titian, from c. 1549. It is held now in the Museo di Capodimonte, in Naples.

== History ==
It is one of many works the artists painted in that period showing Charles V, Holy Roman Emperor, with domains in Spain, Italy and the Americas. No sources definitively date the work, meaning that it is instead dated on the basis of research in various surviving archival documents. According to Vasari's Lives of the Artists, Titian's first painting of Charles was made in 1530, showing him in armour holding a commander's baton. This is confirmed by a letter dated 18 March 1530 from Giacomo Leonardi, ambassador of the Duke of Urbino to the Republic of Venice. All trace of that painting is now lost, though it appears in 17th century collection inventories. Other sources refer to a three-quarter-length portrait mentioned on 15 October 1542, when Alessandro Farnese the Younger wrote thanking the papal nuncio Fabio Mignanelli, then still in Venice, for sending him a portrait of Charles V.

On 20 August 1563 another letter from Alessandro tells Onofrio Panvinio, then working on the iconography for the Villa Farnese in Caprarola, the work of Taddeo Zuccari, to ask the ambassador in Venice to send him a portrait of Charles as the basis for Charles' portrayal in the frescoes. This may be the same work mentioned in 1534 letters between ambassador Lope de Soria and Charles' secretary Francisco de los Cobos, which mention two paintings of the king which Titian was producing simultaneously. Another theory argues the work originated in the Gonzaga collection after being sent to Ferrante by Titian himself in 1549, though this theory is now not widely supported since no documents survive to show how the work might have moved from the Gonzaga to the Farnese collection.

The earliest definitive sources on the work date to the mid 17th century when - now moved from Rome to Parma - the work's subject was lost and it was retitled Portrait of a Philosopher, Portrait of a Man in Black or Portrait of Ferdinand I (Charles's younger brother). In Parma it was also misattributed to Girolamo Mazzola. It moved to Naples in 1734 with the rest of the Farnese Collection when it was inherited by Charles III of Spain after the death of the last Farnese Elisabetta, upon which the original attribution was restored. A long restoration in the 20th century re-identified Charles as the work's subject.

== Description ==
The sovereign is portrayed at half-length with a dark suit and headdress, features that will also be found in later works dated to 1548 such as the Portrait of Charles V today at the Alte Pinakothek in Munich and the Portrait with his wife Isabella (now lost and known only through a copy by Rubens).

Charles V face, colored red as if he was portrayed during sunset, shows a clear resemblance to that of the Portrait of Charles V with a Dog, full-length, preserved at the Museo del Prado, in Madrid and dated of 1533, which therefore allows us to date the Neapolitan version to the same period. In his hand the emperor holds a sheet of paper, where it was believed that the name of Charles V could have been written, and around his neck is a necklace with the Golden Fleece, while his lips are parted due to the well-known physical defect of the king (the so-called "Habsburg chin").

== See also ==
- List of works by Titian

== Bibliography ==
- (in Italian) AA. VV., I Farnese. Arte e collezionismo, Milano, Editrice Electa, 1995, ISBN 978-8843551323.
- (in Italian) AA. VV., Tiziano e il ritratto di corte da Raffaello ai Carracci, Napoli, Editrice Electa, 2006, ISBN 978-8851003364.
