= Holy Family with Angels (Parmigianino) =

Painting by Parmigianino

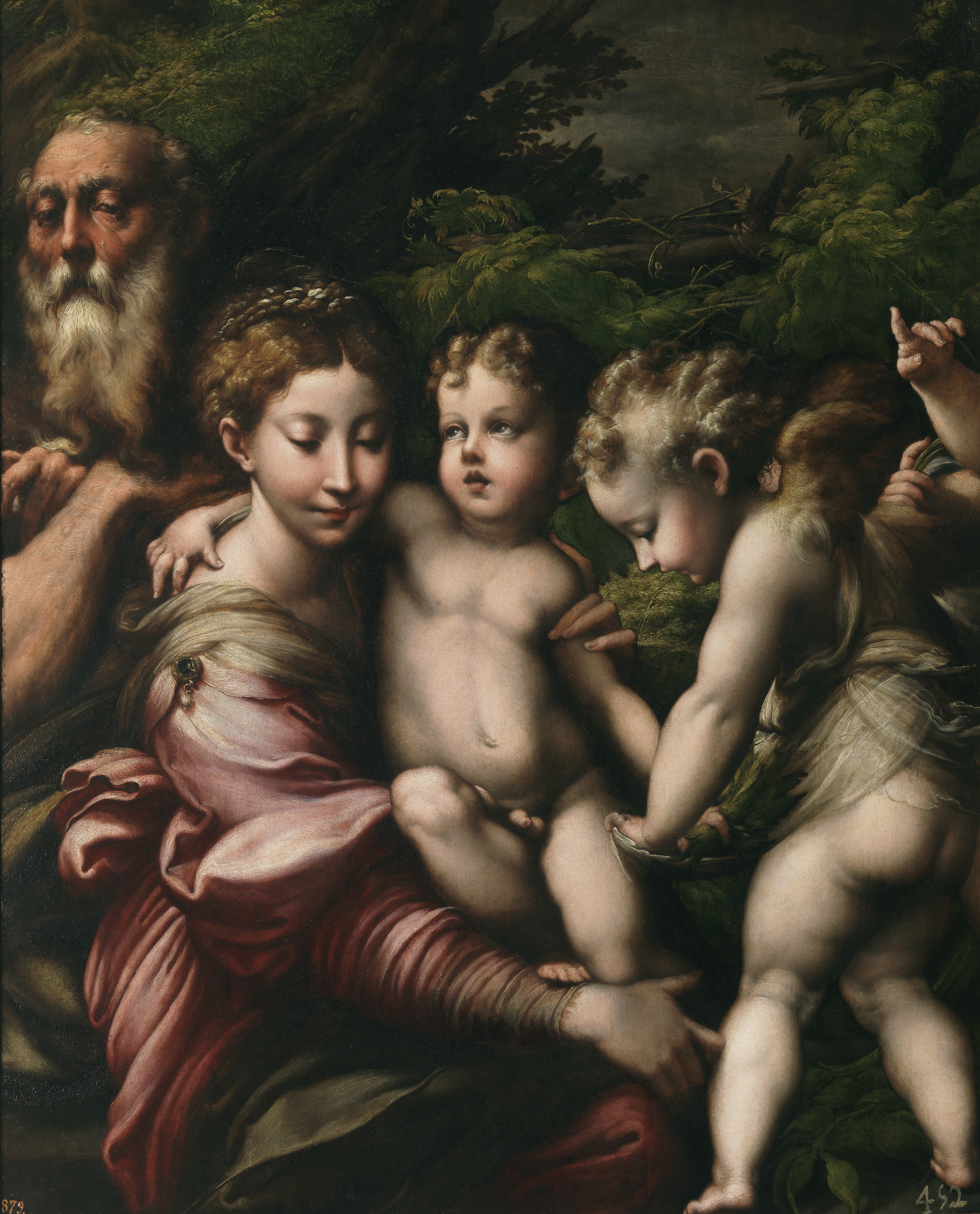
- Artist: Parmigianino
- Year: c. 1524
- Medium: Oil on panel
- Dimensions: 110 cm × 89 cm (43 in × 35 in)
- Location: Museo del Prado, Madrid

The Holy Family with Angels is an oil on panel painting by Parmigianino, from c. 1524. It is held in the Museo del Prado, in Madrid.

It is usually identified with the "large painting" showing "Our Lady with the Christ Child on her neck taking fruit from an angel's lap and an old man with hairy arms" which Giorgio Vasari states Parmigianino produced just before leaving for Rome, adding that it was "made with skill and judgement". The painting was given to Pope Clement VII, who gave it to Ippolito de' Medici. By the early 17th century it was in Madrid in Pompeo Leoni's collection, which was divided after his death in 1608.

An early copy previously in San Quintino, Parma, is now in Rocca di Fontanellato. A preparatory study with various differences to the main work is now in the Cabinet des Dessins at the Louvre.
