= Alessandro Bernabei =

Italian painter (1580–1630)

Alessandro Bernabei (1580–1630) was an Italian painter of the late-Renaissance or Mannerist period, active in his native Parma. Two of his brothers were painters: his twin, Francesco, and his elder brother Pier Antonio Bernabei, also called Della Casa or Maccabeo.

He painted a Dying St Joseph for the church of San Pietro, Parma.
