= Giovanni Bolla =

Italian painter

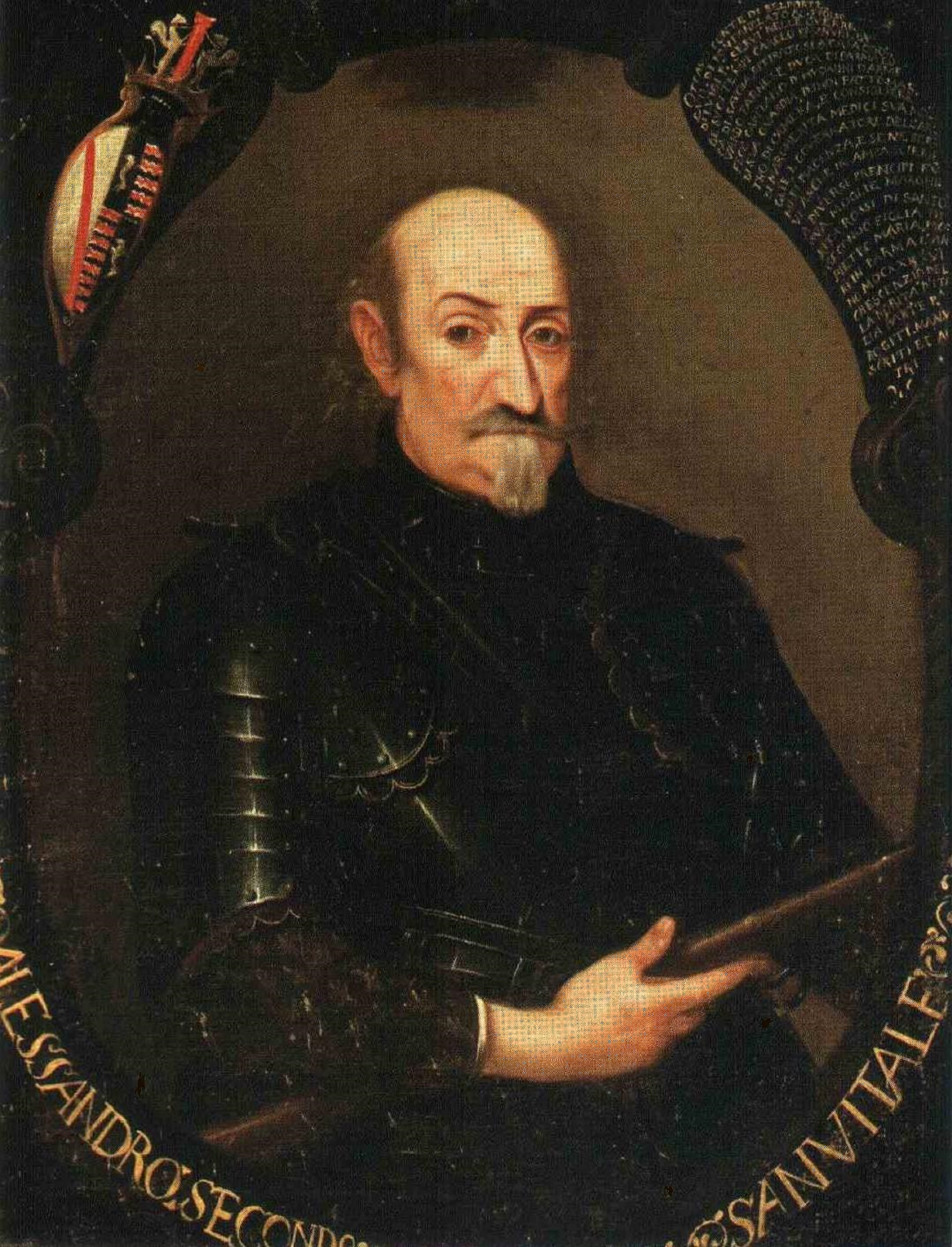
Portrait by Bolla of Alessandro II Sanvitale, a nobleman of Parma

Giovanni Bolla (1650 – September 15, 1735) was an Italian painter, active in the Duchy of Parma.

He was born and died in Parma, and seem to have developed a style from Carlo Cignani. Among his works are an Assumption in San Pietro, a San Carlo for the oratory of San Cristoforo, and frescoes in the Palazzo Arcivescovile of Parma.
