= San Pietro, Parma =

Church building in Parma, Italy

Coordinates: 44°48′5.03″N 10°19′38.56″E

Church of San Pietro in Parma
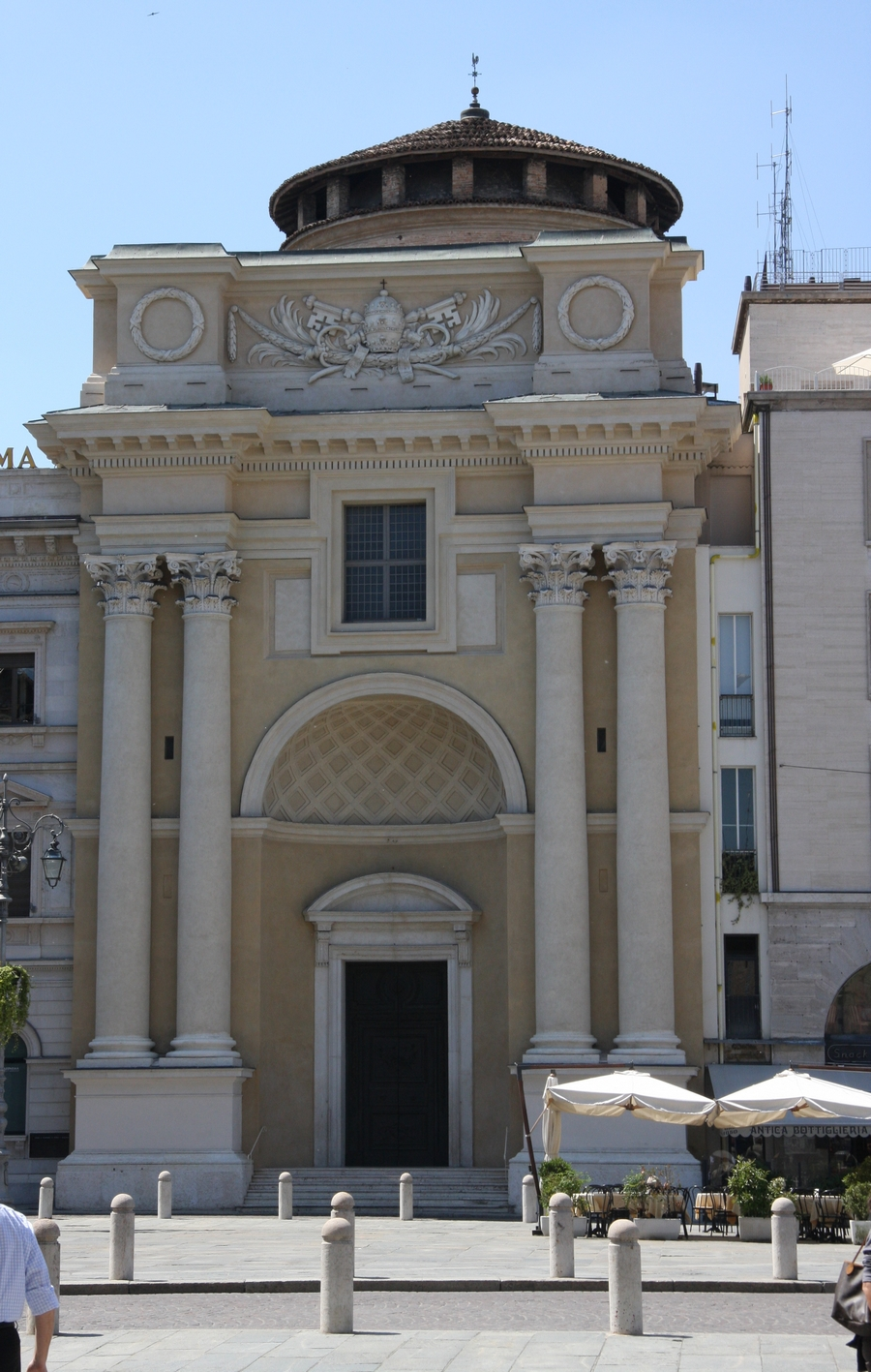

Religion
- Affiliation: Roman Catholic
- Province: Parma

Location
- Location: Parma, Emilia-Romagna, Italy
- Interactive map of Church of San Pietro in Parma

Architecture
- Architect: Ennemond Alexandre Petitot
- Type: Church
- Style: Neoclassic
- Groundbreaking: 1707
- Completed: 1762

San Pietro or San Pietro Apostolo is a Neoclassic-style, Roman Catholic church located on Piazza Garibaldi in Parma.

== History ==
A church of San Pietro in Parma is first mentioned in the year 955. Tradition holds that it was erected atop the remains of an Ancient Roman temple dedicated to Jove. It was rebuilt during the 15th century in Gothic-style by Cristoforo Zaneschi. In the early 16th-century papal bull by Pope Leo X describes it as a collegiate church, Collegio di San Girolamo, with 12 priests. The present church was designed by Ennemond Alexandre Petitot, who replaced the prior facade, construction started in 1707 but was not completed till 1762.

The façade is decorated with the papal symbols of the tiara, festoons, and keys, in a design by Petitot and modeled in stucco by Benigno Bossi. The nave ceiling and cupola are frescoed by Giovanni Antonio Vezzani.

The main altar has a canvas depicting the Madonna and child and Saints Peter and Paul by Alessandro Mazzola. The first chapel on the left has an altarpiece depicting the Glory of St Joseph by Alessandro Bernabei. The second chapel on the left has an altarpiece depicting the Virgin in Glory surrounded by the Apostles by Giovanni Bolla. The church also has a work by Clemente Ruta.

The church was suppressed by decree of the Napoleonic government in 1811, and reconsecrated in 1852, only to be suppressed again in 1867.
