= Alessandro Mazzola (painter) =

Italian painter (1533–1608)

Alessandro Mazzola (1533 in Parma – 1608 in Parma) was an Italian painter, active in Parma in the late Renaissance.

Alessandro was born in Parma to Girolamo Mazzola Bedoli, who had married the daughter of Pier Ilaro Mazzola, a cousin of Parmigianino, hence added to his name the Mazzola surname.

He painted figures in the spandrels and southern ceiling of the nave of the Cathedral. Two portraits by him were found in the National Gallery. A Virgin Mary altarpiece in a left chapel and a Christ Ascended in the second chapel of the Steccata are attributed to him. A painting of St. Francis of Assisi in the Oratorio della Concezione is attributed to him. The main altarpieces for the churches of San Pietro and San Tommaso (Birth of Christ) are attributed to Alessandro.
