= Pier Antonio Bernabei =

Italian painter

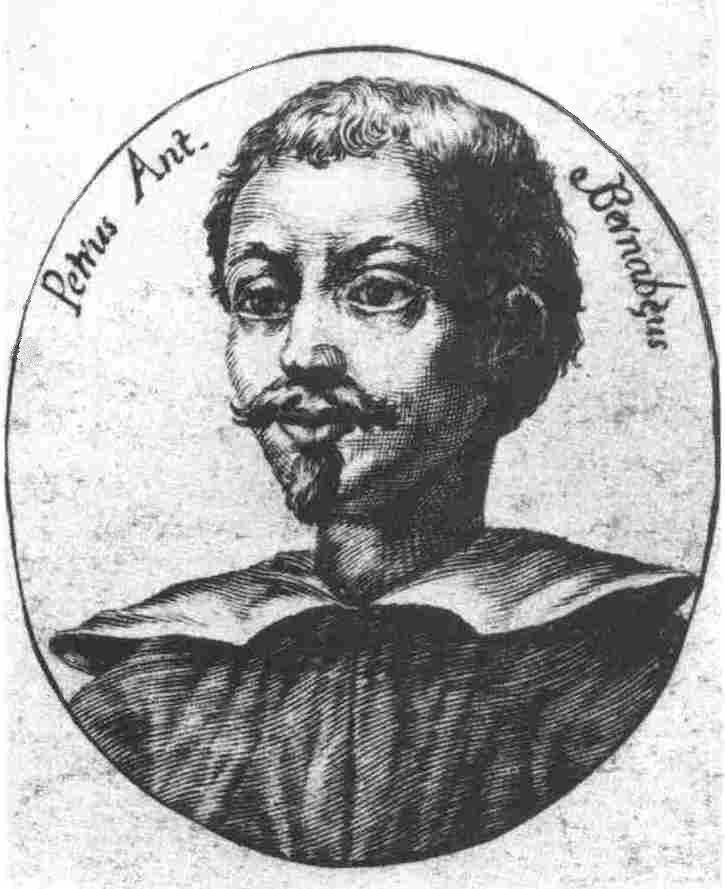
Pier Antonio Bernabei

Pier Antonio Bernabei (1570–1630) was an Italian painter also known as Della Casa.

== Biography ==
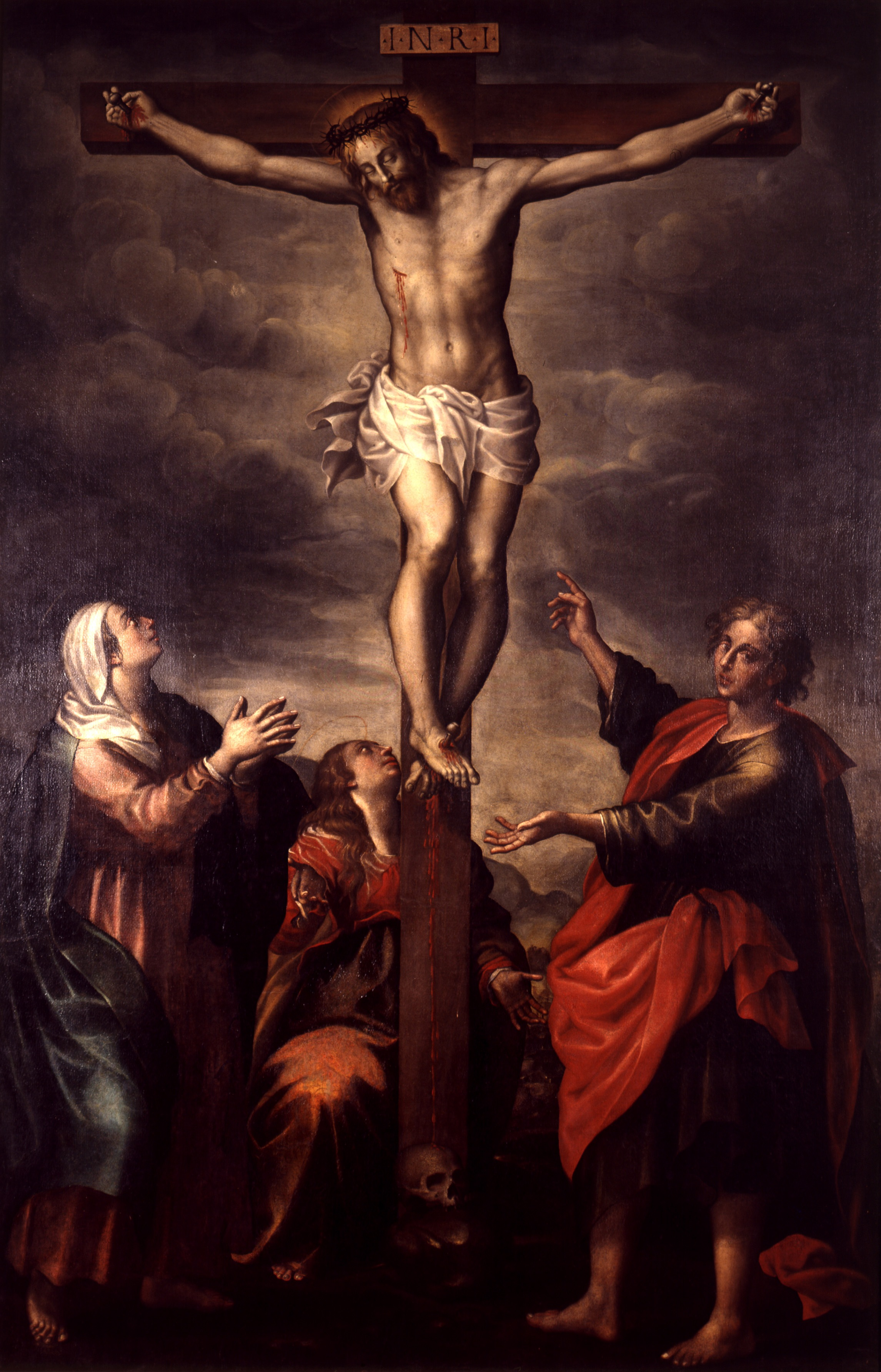
Pier Antonio Bernabei, Crucifixion with Virgin and Saints, oil on canvas, 250 cm x 200 cm, Pinacoteca Stuard, Parma

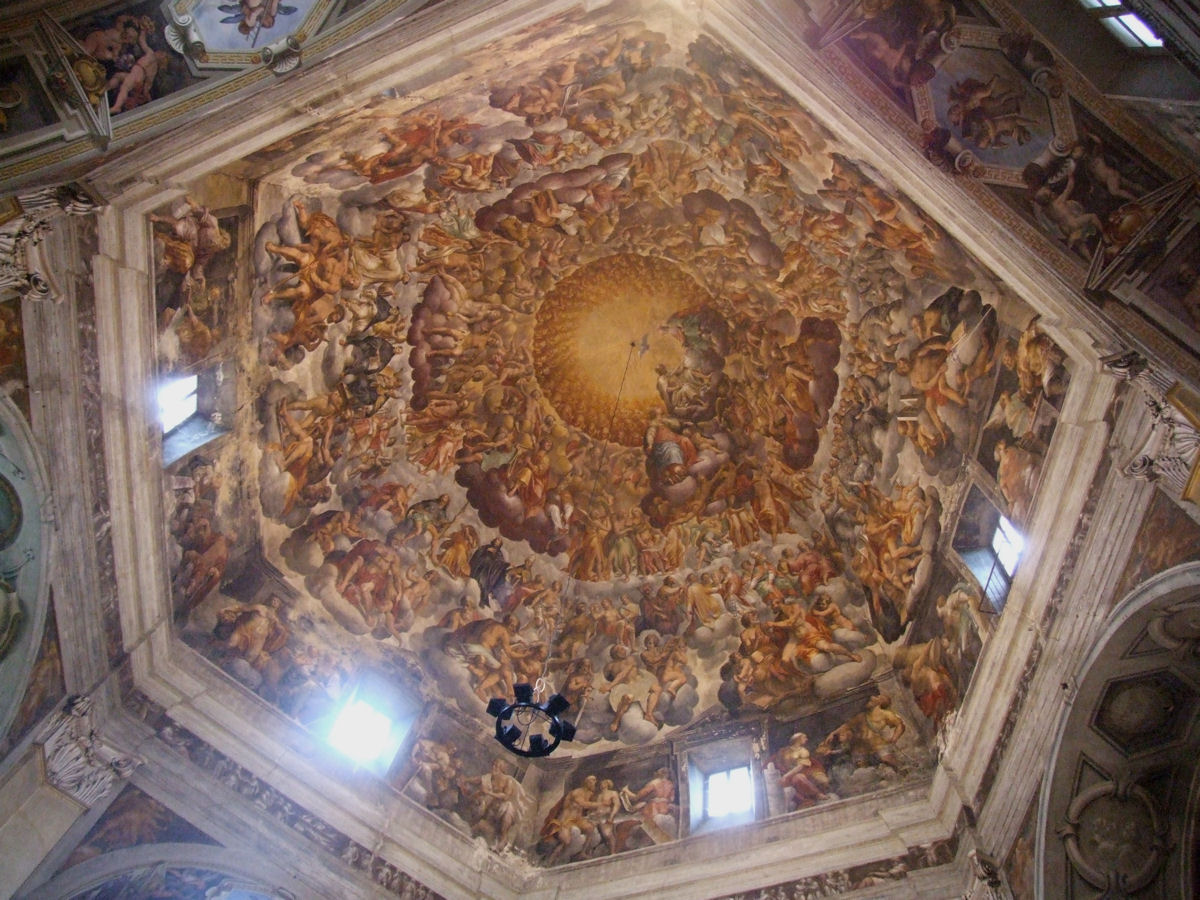
Cupola Frescoes in Santa Maria del Quartiere.

A native of Parma, Pier Antonio Bernabei was a follower of the style of Correggio. Among his best-known works is a frescoed view of Paradise on the cupola of Santa Maria del Quartiere in Parma. Another renowned fresco is the Assumption for a chapel at the church of San Martino at Traversetolo. There are other works by this master at the Carmelites, and at the sacristy of the church of San Quintino, Parma. His younger brothers, Francesco and Alessandro Bernabei were also painters.
