= San Tommaso, Parma =

Church building in Parma, Italy

Coordinates: 44°47′56.06″N 10°19′39.37″E

Church of San Tommaso in Parma
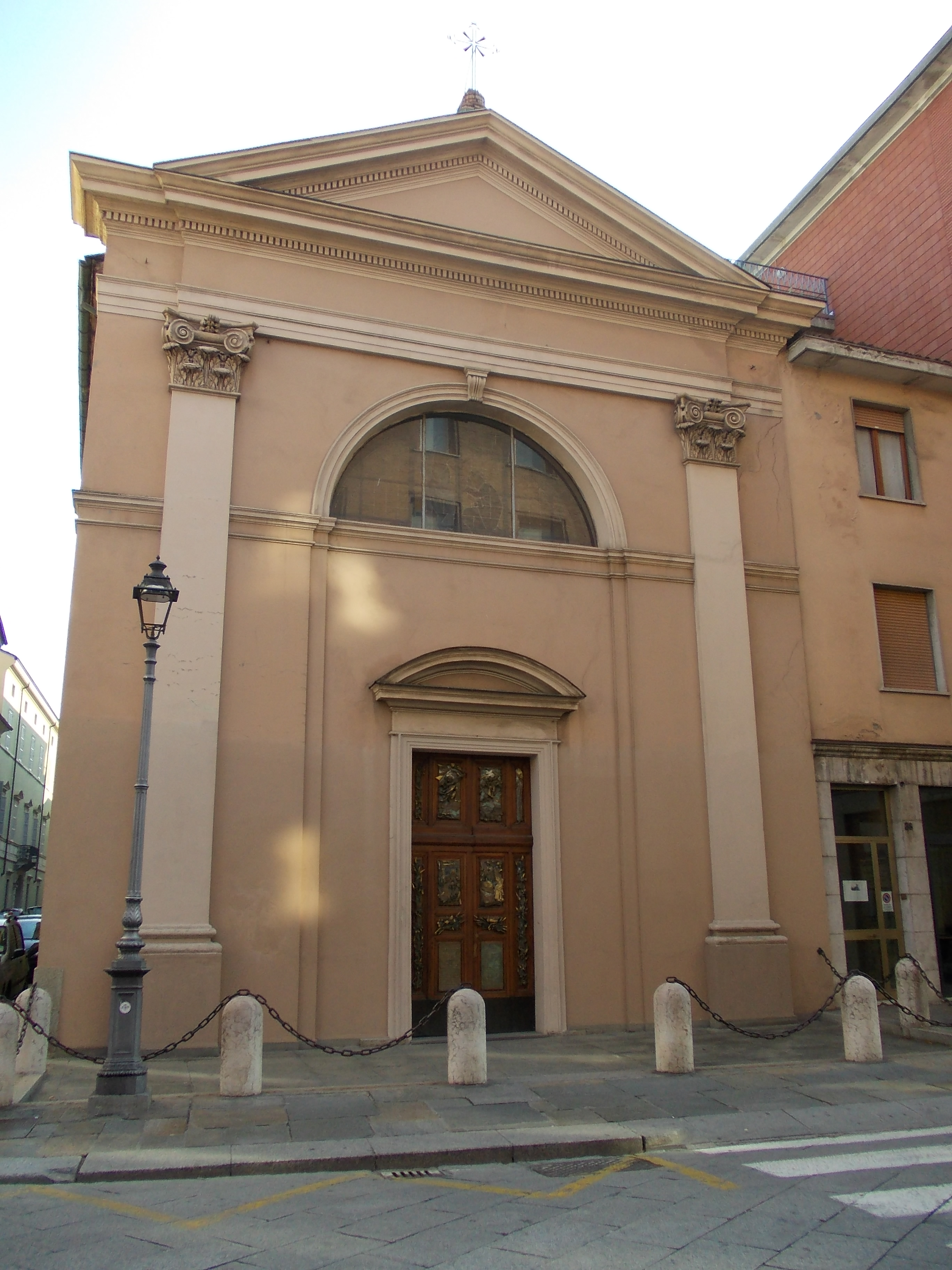

Religion
- Affiliation: Roman Catholic
- Province: Parma

Location
- Location: Parma, Emilia-Romagna, Italy
- Interactive map of Church of San Tommaso in Parma

Architecture
- Type: Church
- Style: Neoclassic
- Completed: 1850

San Tommaso is a Neoclassic-style, Roman Catholic church located on Strada Farini 38 in Parma, region of Emilia-Romagna, Italy.

== History ==
A church of this name existed for this parish, located outside the walls, prior to 1028. When Parma expelled the occupying French army in 1521, specifically on 21 December 21st which is the feast day of St Thomas, this prompted the city to declare this saint their protector, and gained new patronage for this church. The building was rebuilt in the late 18th century under the direction of Carlo Salvatore Bettoli, who designed the facade. Work continued until the mid-19th century.

Terracotta decorations along Borgo Antini belong to the original church. The church has a single nave with four chapels on each side. A chapel on the left has an altarpiece depicting a Pietà by Antonio Bresciani. The five stained-glass windows, designed in 1933–1935 by Luigi Pilastro from Milan.

The main altarpiece depicts a Nativity with St Joseph and St Thomas, attributed to a young Francesco Mazzola.
