= San Quintino, Parma =

Church building in Parma, Italy

Coordinates: 44.7989°N 10.3310°E

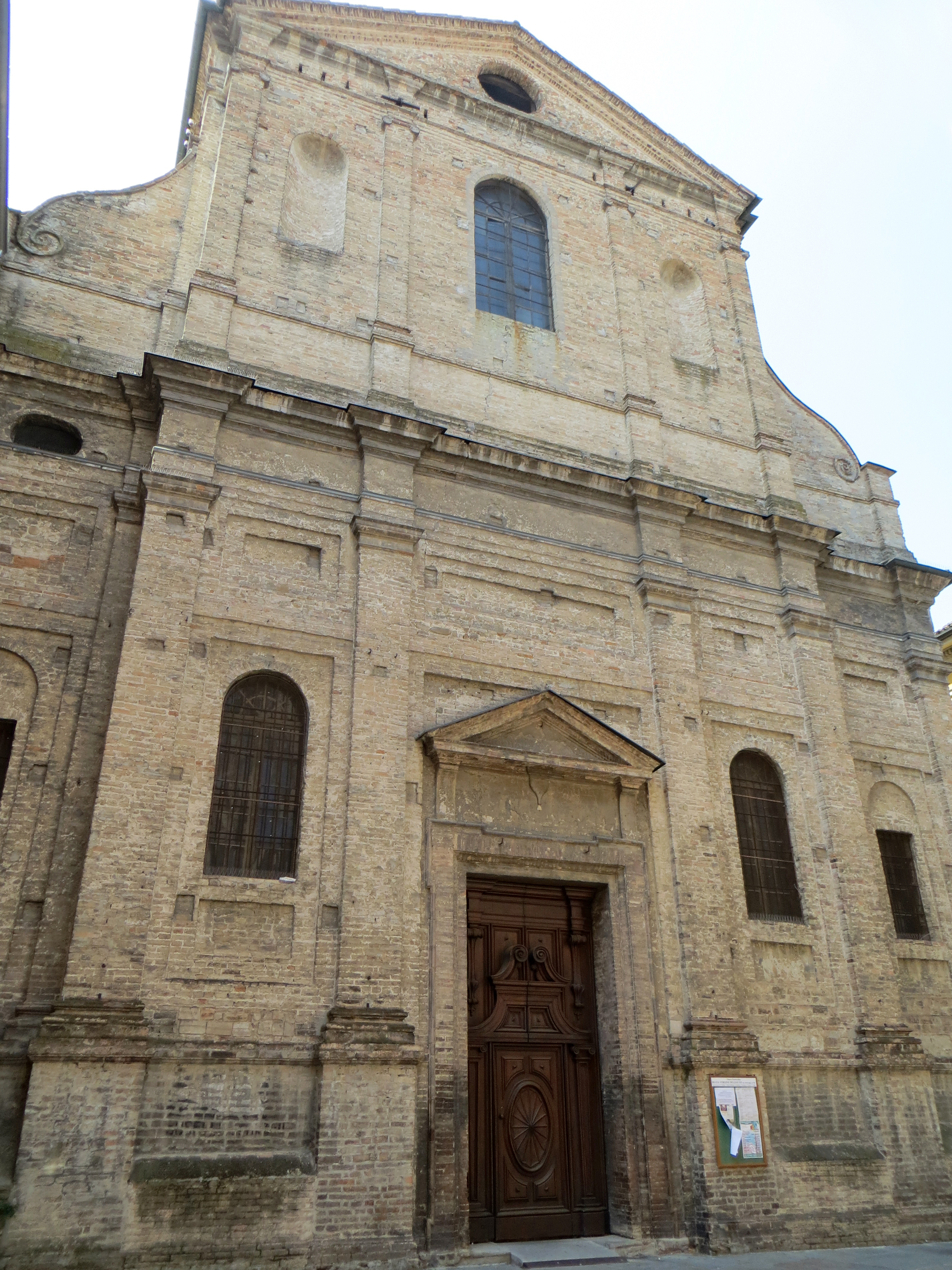
Brick facade of church

The San Quintino is a Renaissance style, Roman Catholic church located at Strada XXII Luglio number 21, near the intersection with Borgo Scacchini, in Parma, Italy.

== History ==
First documentation of the church or oratory at the site, dates to 833, when the property was outside the city walls. Towards the 12th century the church was rebuilt and affiliated with a Vallombrosan Benedictine order monastery. It then became a convent for nuns. The Abbess Giovanna Sanvitale commissioned the choir from Marco Antonio Zucchi in 1512. The sacristy corridor, a fragment of a capital and a stone door with Romanesque architecture decorations date to this period. During the 16th century, further reconstructions inverted the original orientation. The convent was deconsecrated in the early 18th century, and became private apartments. The church was utilized by the parish.

Above the entranceway there is an 18th-century painting with St John of God. Pier Antonio Bernabei painted a St Paul in the sacristy.

Many of the fine artworks once in the church, including altarpieces by Giovanni Lanfranco, a Saints Benedict and Quentin; and Giuseppe Ribera, an Assumption of the Virgin; and by Francesco Marmitta, a Saint Benedict and Quentin and Virgin: all were looted by French troops during the Revolutionary wars. The baptismal chapel has a canvas depicting the Baptism of Christ (2015) painted by Giovanna Scapinelli. In the chapel dedicated to the Blessed Orsolina (died early 14th century) has altarpiece depicting Orsolina talking to the Pope Clement VII at Avignon painted by Benigno Bossi. In 1887 the ceiling of this chapel was frescoed. On the walls are two canvases with episodes in the life of the blessed Orsolina by Cecrope Barilli.
