= Cornelius Kierstede =

Early-American silversmith

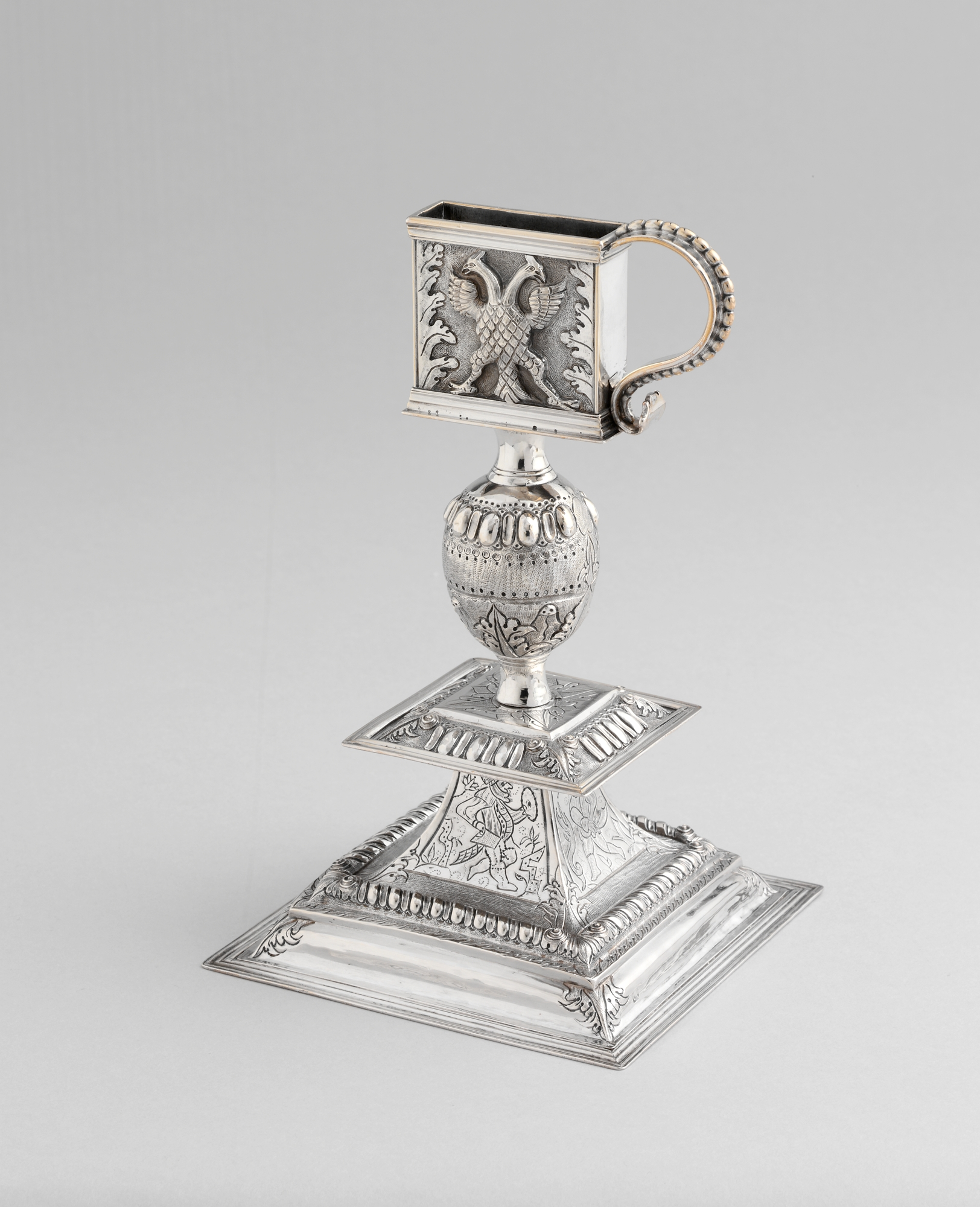
Snuffer Stand, 1705, Metropolitan Museum of Art

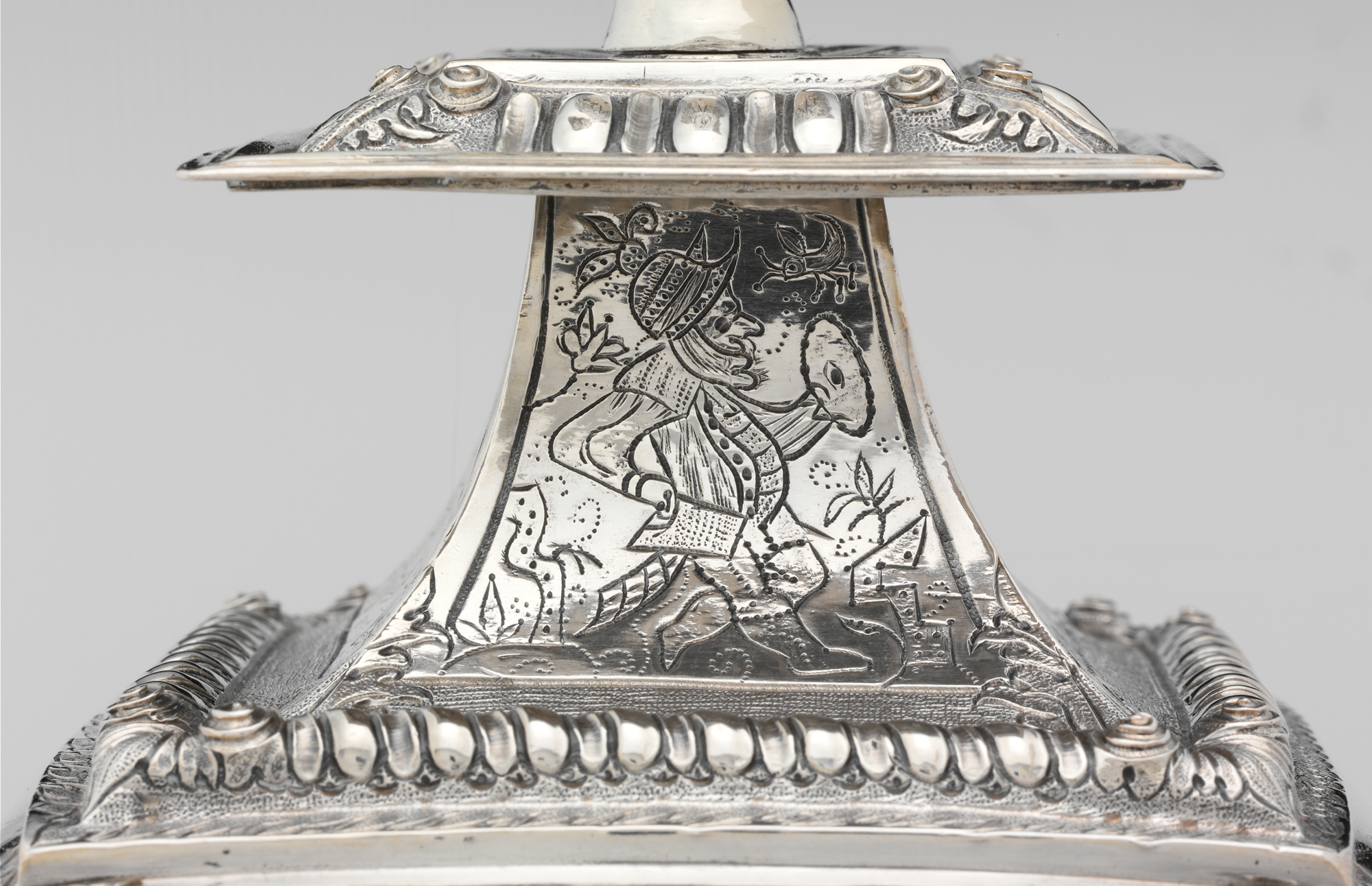
Snuffer Stand (detail), 1705, Metropolitan Museum of Art

Cornelius Kierstede (December 25, 1674 – 1757) was a silversmith from the Thirteen Colonies, active in New York City and New Haven, Connecticut.

Kierstede was the third generation of his family in New York, and christened in the Reformed Dutch Church on January 5, 1675. He was made a freeman of New York City on July 26, 1698, and worked there as a silversmith until 1704. From 1704 to 1706, he worked in Albany, New York, then again worked in New York City from 1707 to 1722. According to New Haven, Connecticut, town records of Sept. 19, 1721, he and Peter and James Ferris leased "copper and other mines except iron mines on the Bleu hils in said New Haven. . . for fifty years". This venture did not succeed. Apparently he moved to New Haven circa 1724, where he lived on the west side of Church Street. A deed dated Apr. 24, 1727, in the New Haven Land Records describes him as a "goldsmith of New York". In 1753 the New Haven Selectmen placed him in charge of a conservator "by reason of his advanced age & infirmities." He may have died in August 1757 in Bergen, New Jersey.

Kierstede's work is collected in the Metropolitan Museum of Art, Winterthur Museum, the Milwaukee Art Museum, and Yale University Art Gallery.

== Gallery ==
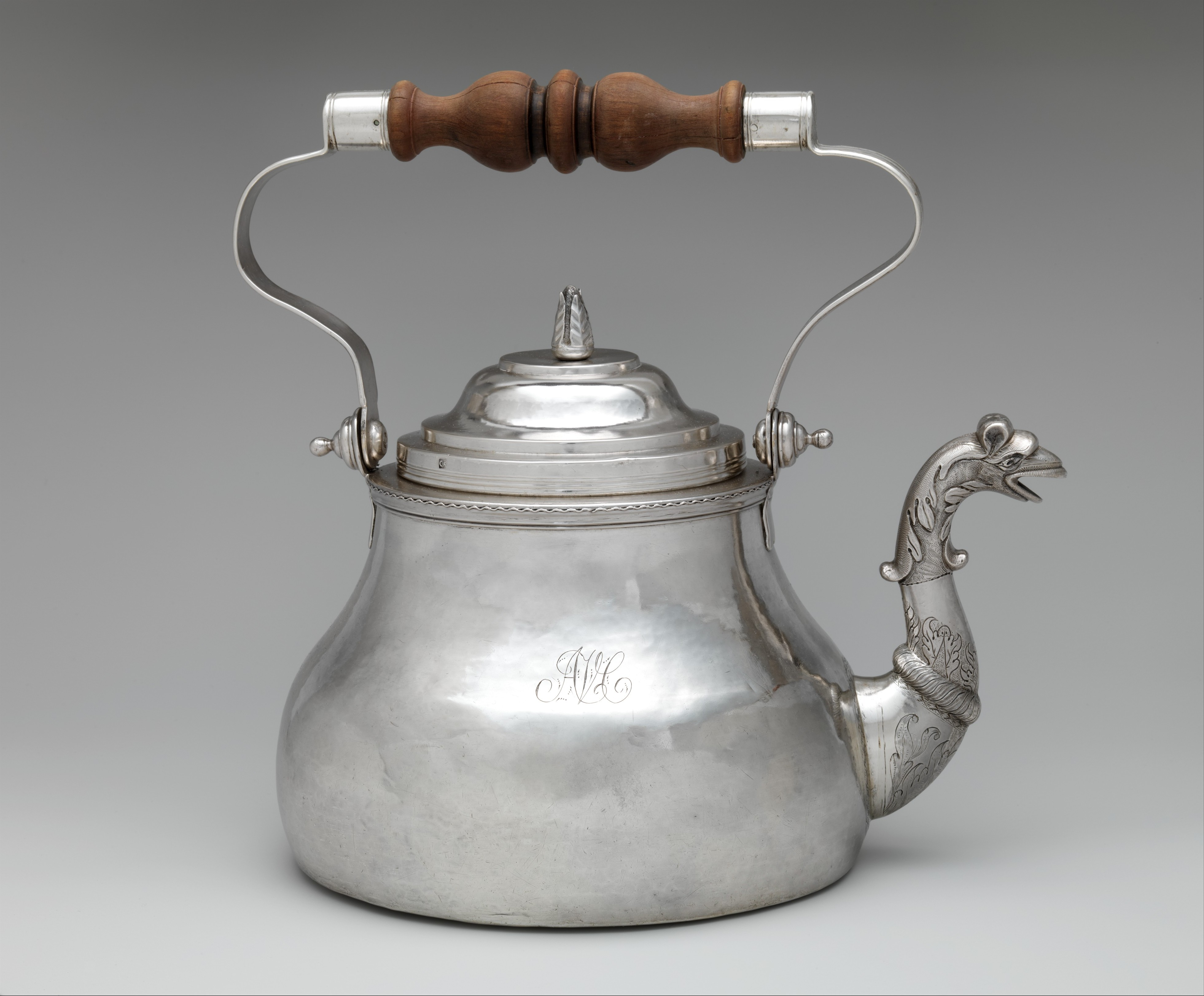
Teakettle, 1710-20, Metropolitan Museum of Art

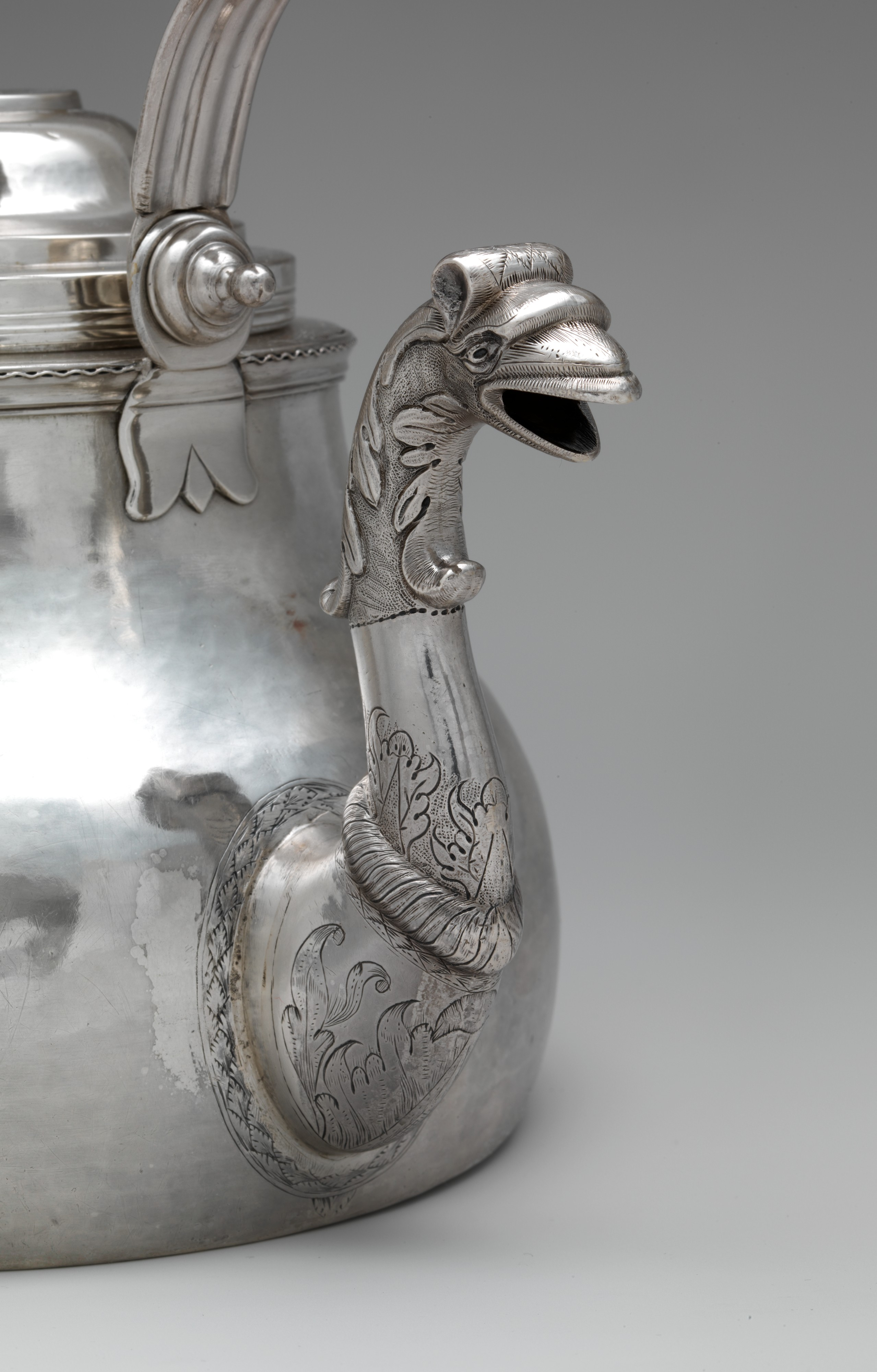
Teakettle (detail), 1710-20, Metropolitan Museum of Art

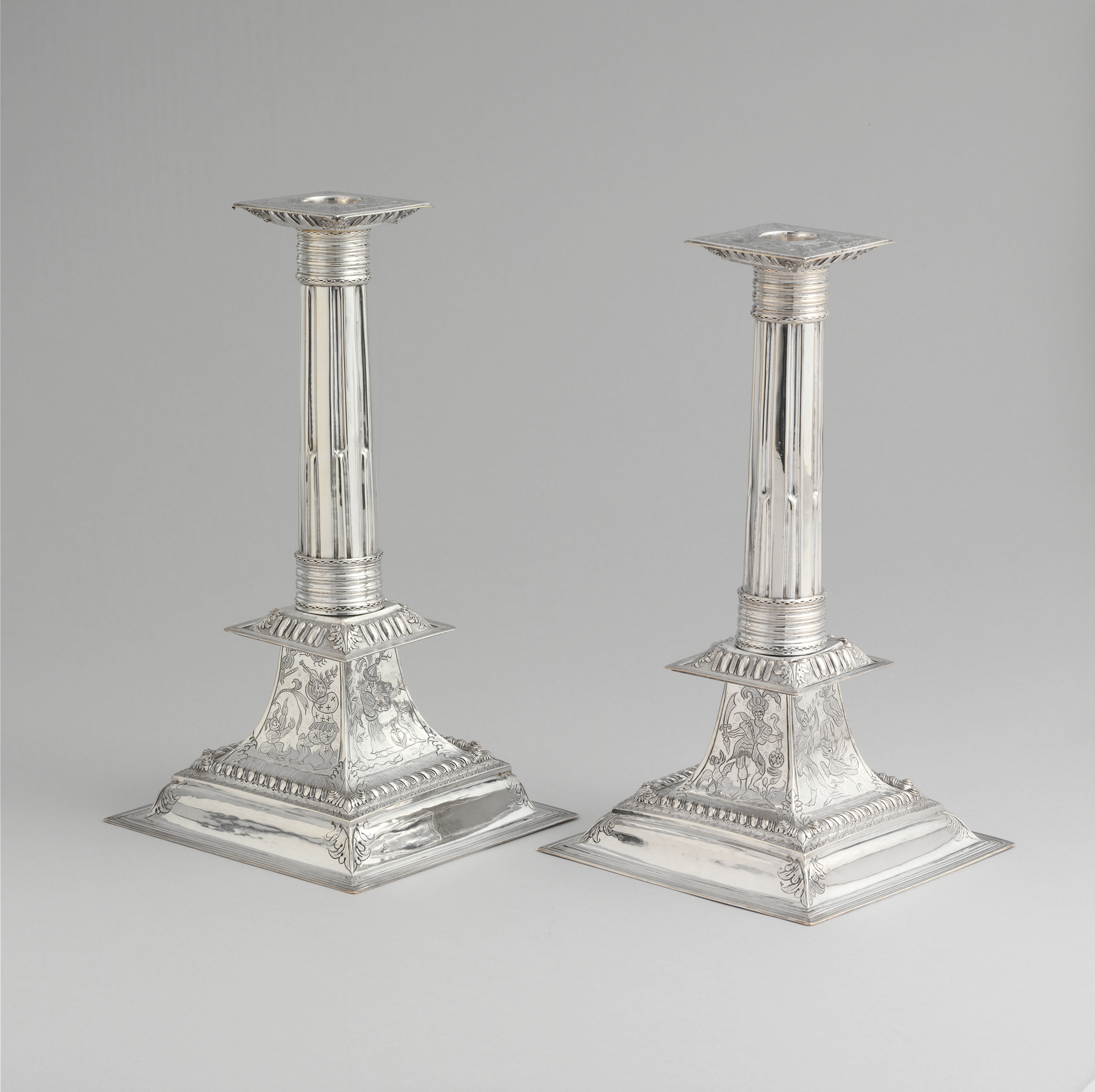
Candlestick Pair, 1705, Metropolitan Museum of Art

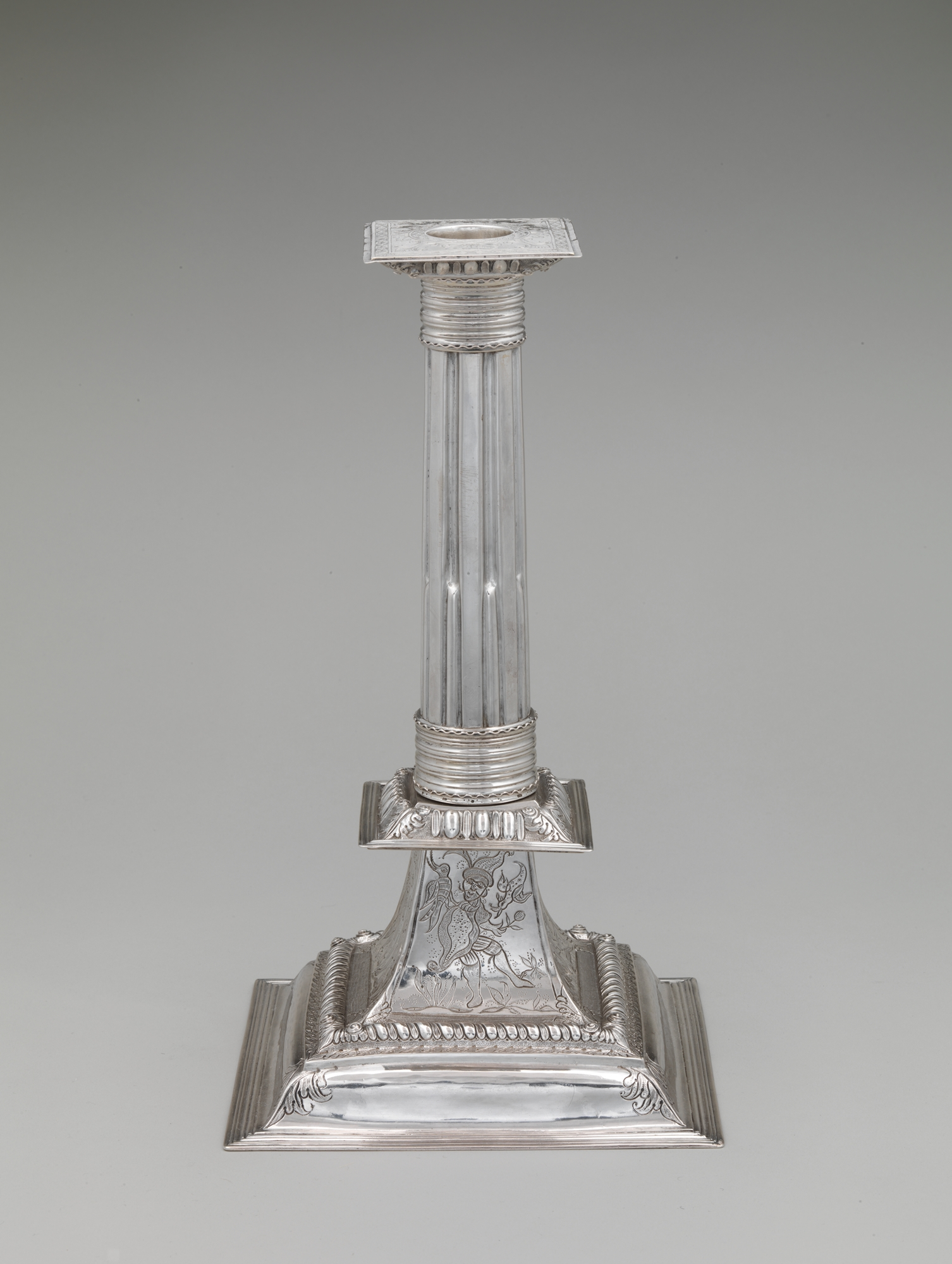
Candlestick, 1705, Metropolitan Museum of Art

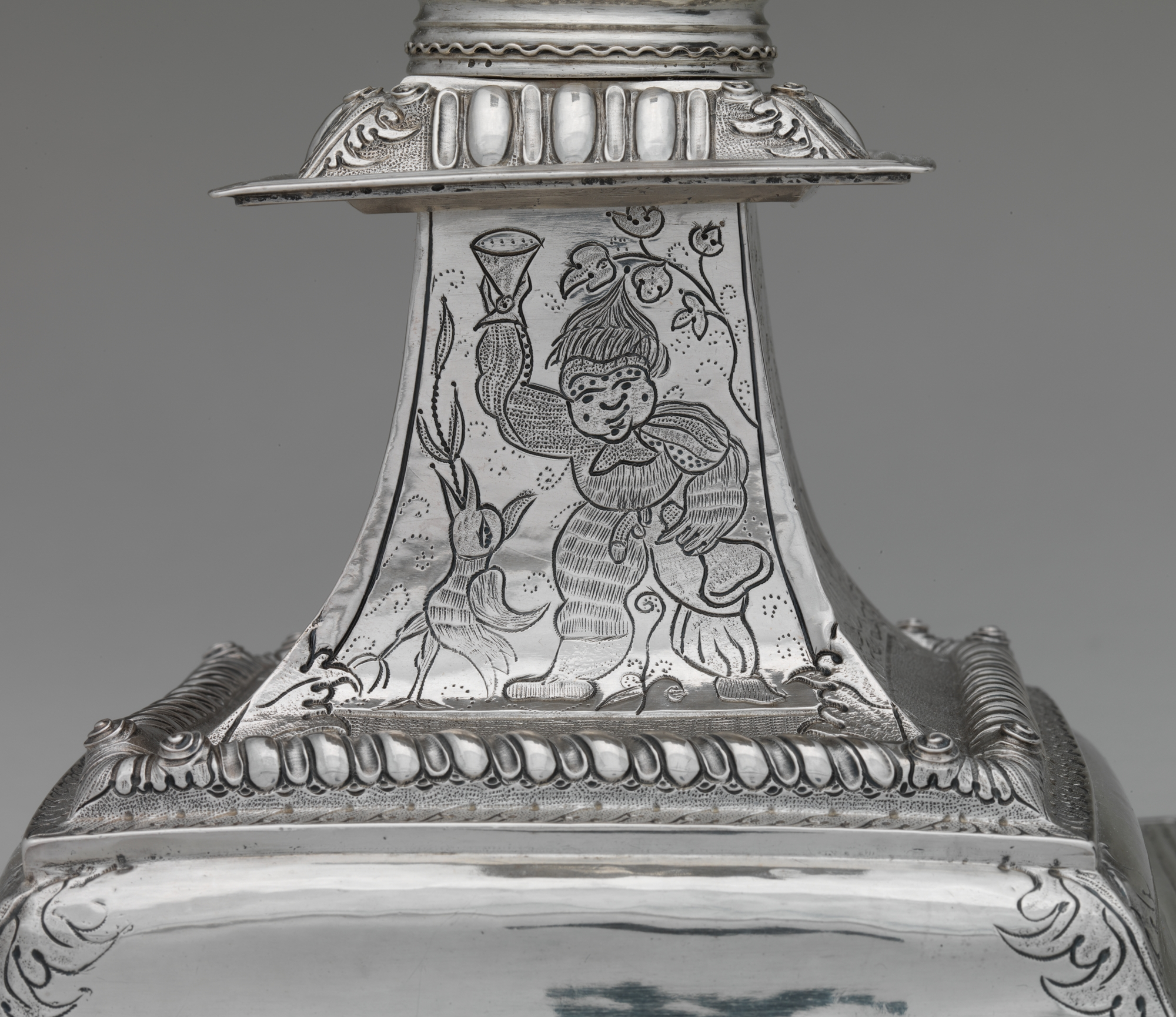
Candlestick (Detail), 1705, Metropolitan Museum of Art

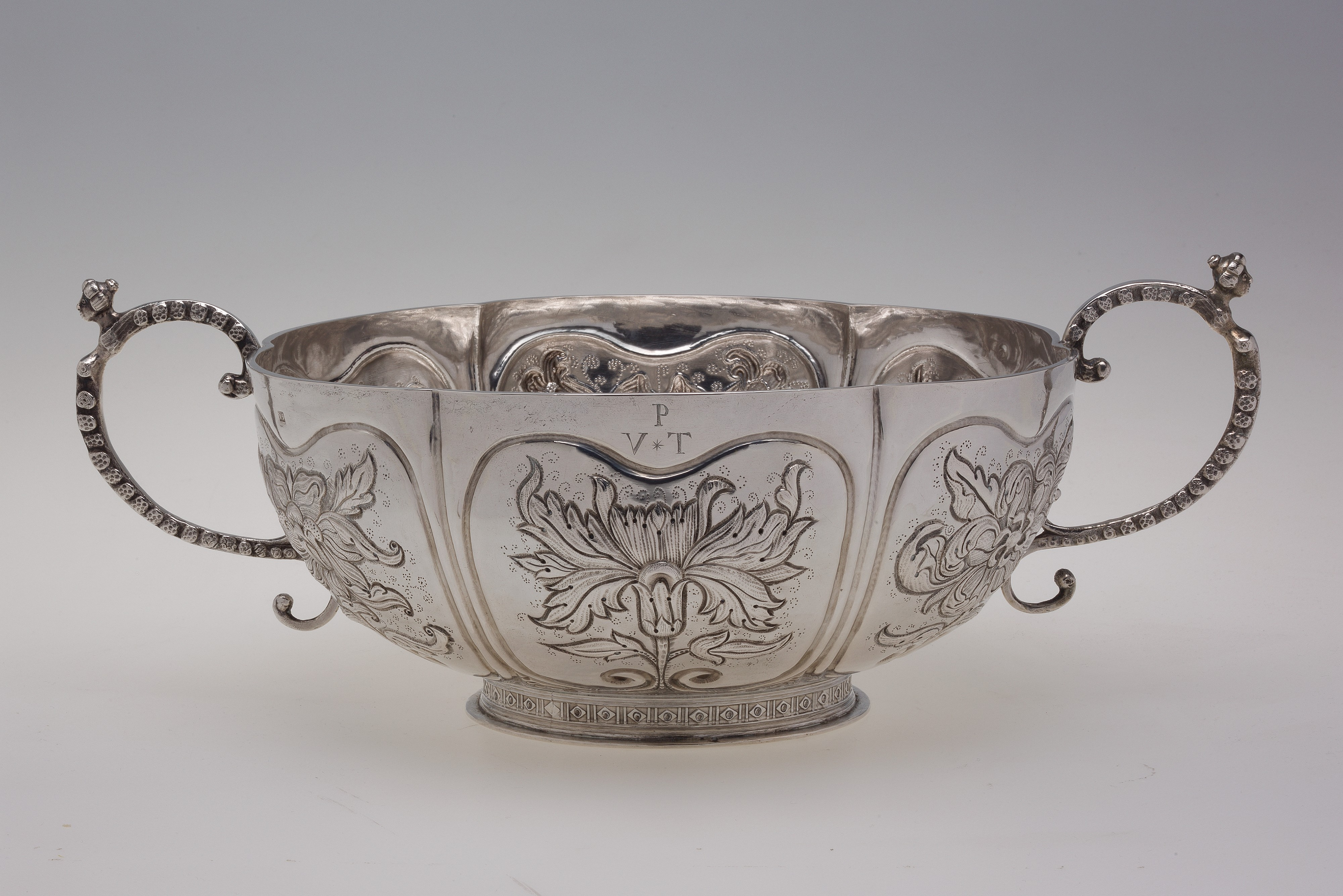
Two-handed Bowl, 1700-1710, Metropolitan Museum of Art

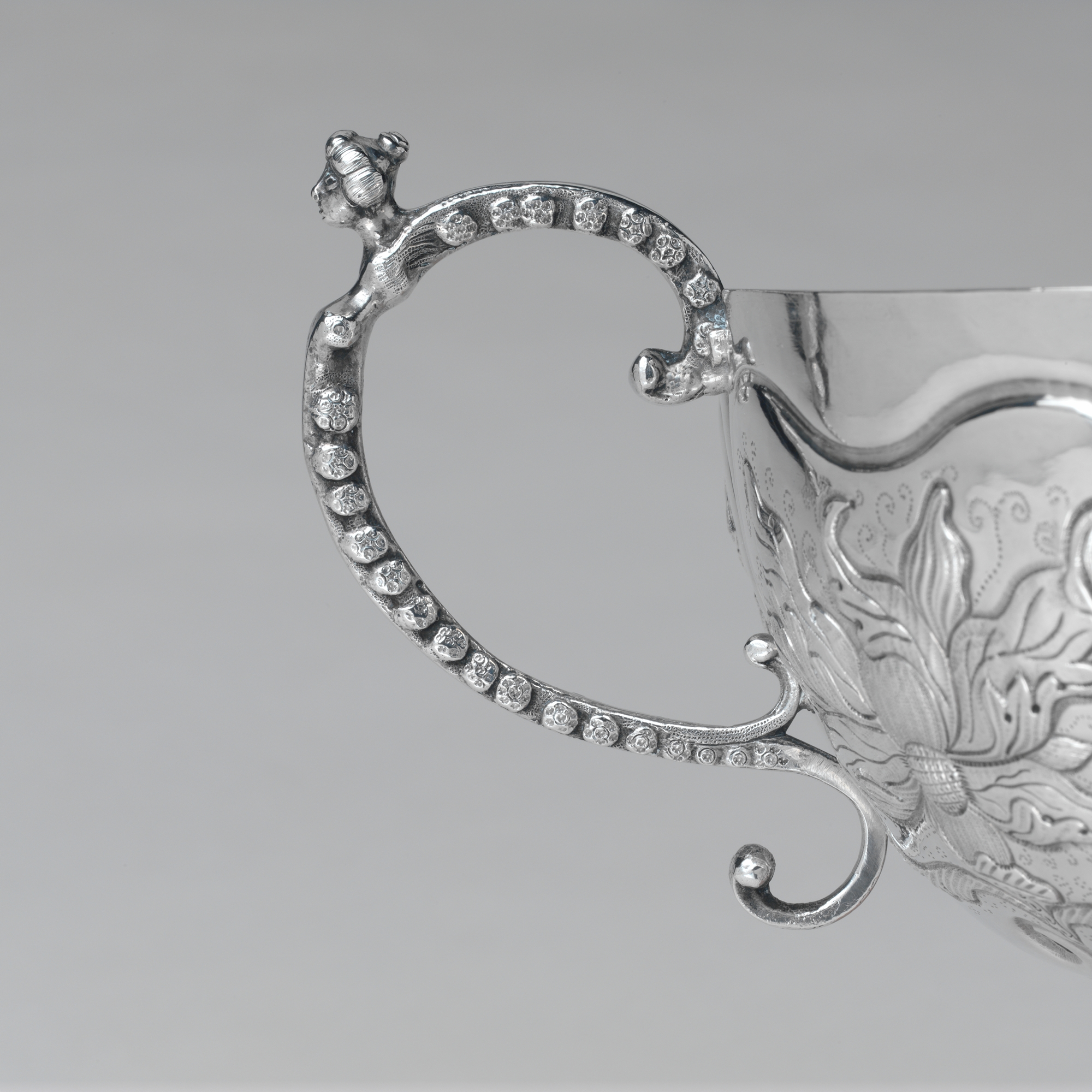
Two-handed Bowl (detail), 1700-1710, Metropolitan Museum of Art

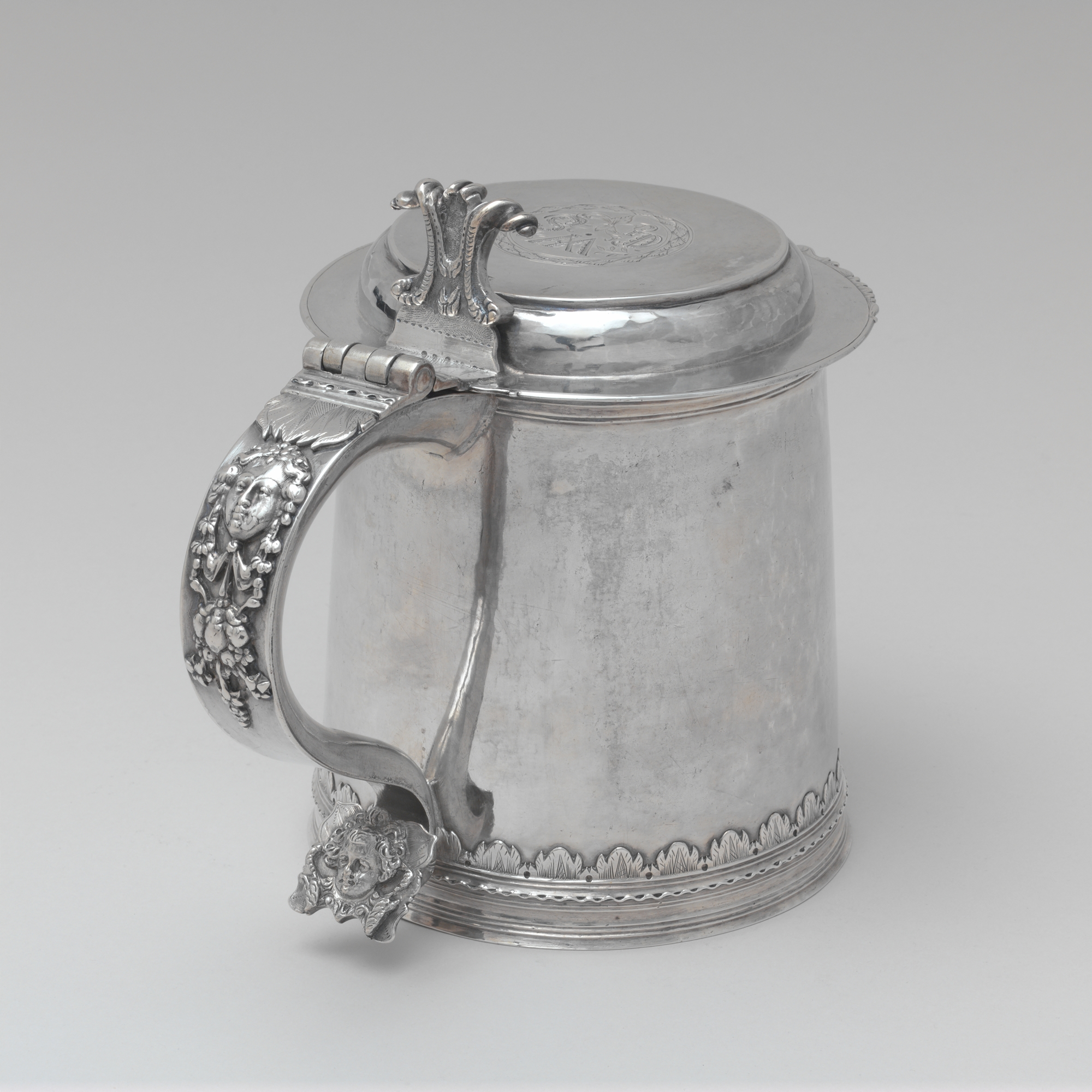
Tankard, 1700-1720, Metropolitan Museum of Art

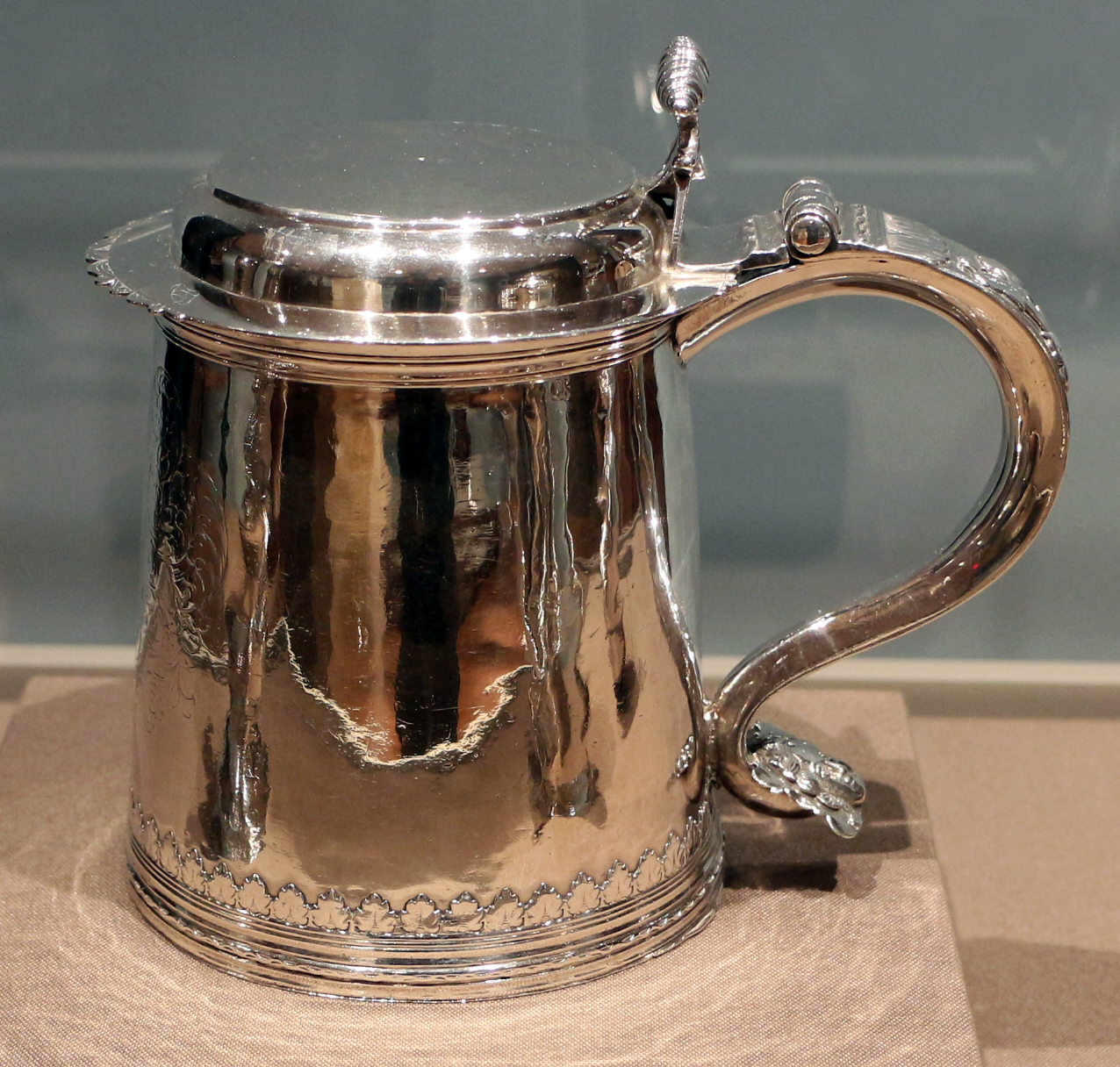
Boccale, 1695-1705, Milwaukee Art Museum
