= Francesco Marmitta =

Italian painter

Francesco Marmitta (ca. 1460-1505) was an Italian painter and jeweler. Marmitta was born in Parma, Italy, between 1462 and 1466. His father was a merchant of wool and wax. His work is held in the collections of the Metropolitan Museum of Art and the Walters Art Museum.

== Gallery ==
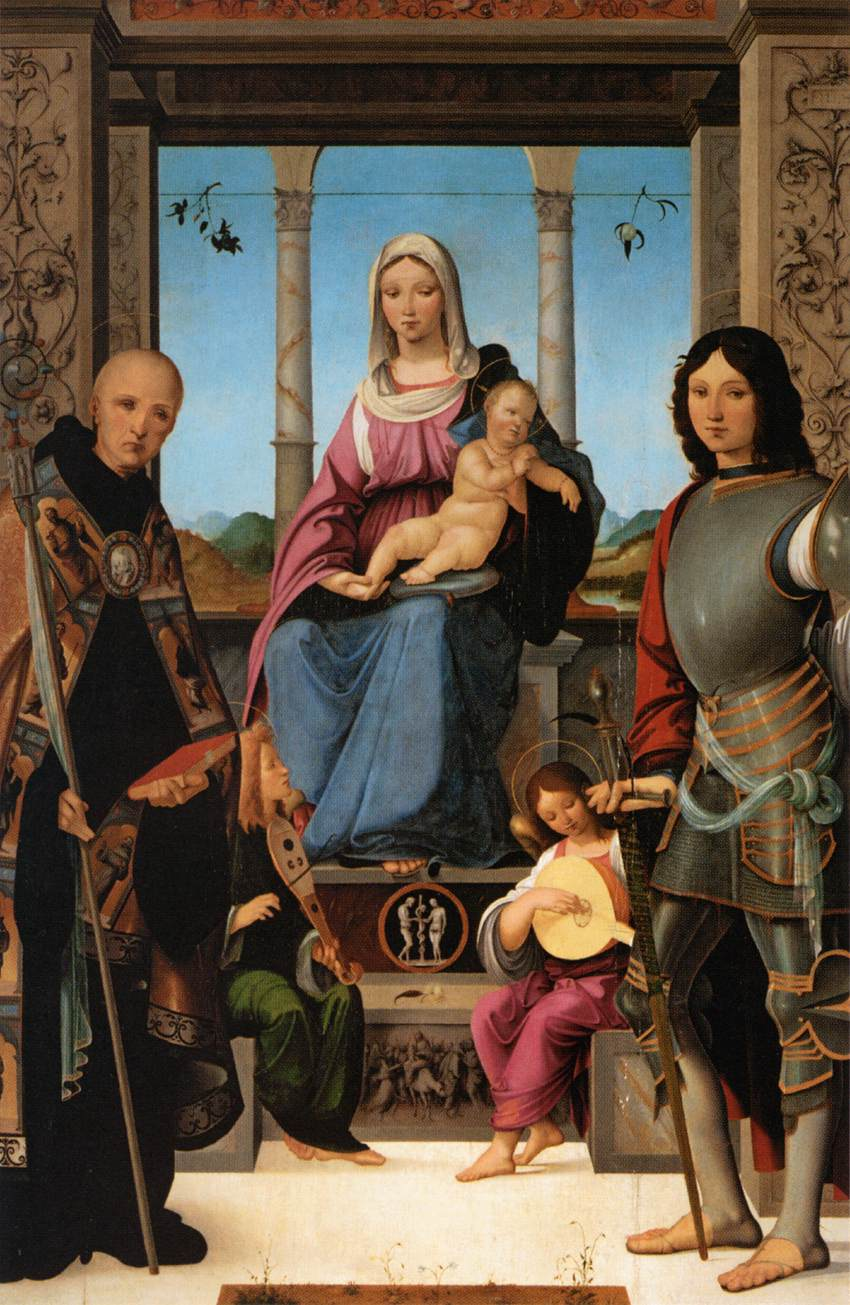
Virgin and Child Flanked by Sts Benedict and Quentin, 1500-05, Musée du Louvre, originally from San Quintino, Parma

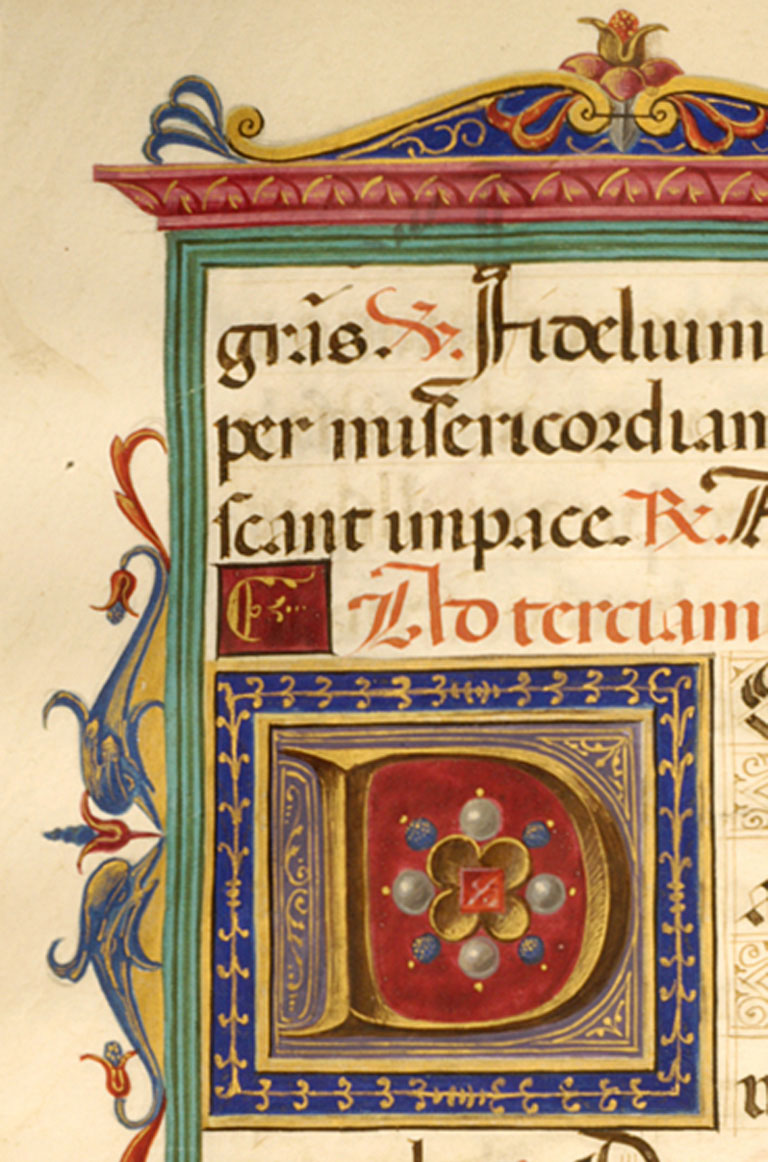
Leaf from Rangoni Bentivoglio Book of Hours, ca. 1505, Walters Art Museum
