= Girolamo Mazzola Bedoli =

Italian Mannerist painter

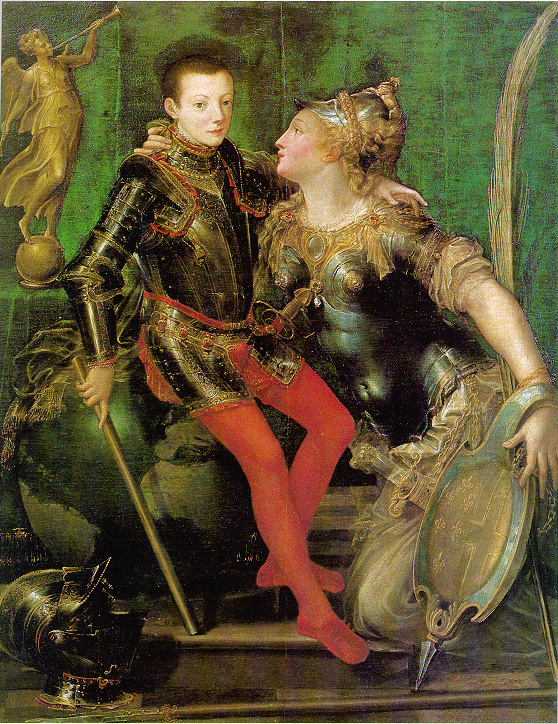
Girolamo Mazzola Bedoli, Allegorical Portrait of Parma Embracing Alessandro Farnese, Galleria Nazionale di Parma.

Girolamo Mazzola Bedoli (c. 1500–1569) was an Italian painter active in the Mannerist style.

== Biography ==
Bedoli was born in Parma, Italy, in a family coming from Viadana in Lombardy. He was a near contemporary of Parmigianino, and after the early death of the latter master, he completed some frescoes initially commissioned from Parmigianino. For example, he completed works in the apse of Santa Maria della Steccata. He is known to have worked in the studio of Parmigianino's uncles in Parma. He married the daughter of Pier Ilaro Mazzola, a cousin of Parmigianino; hence, he added to his name the Mazzola appellation.

He painted, along with his father-in-law, the Immaculate Conception for the Oratorio della Concezione (now in Parma Gallery). Art historian Sydney J. Freedberg describes him in his masterpiece of the Annunciation as resembling Parmigianino in the same way Bronzino reflected the elder Pontormo, equal in skill and refinement, but lacking the original abstracting poetry of the image. Bedoli's works are equal in polish, but stony in feeling. He produced murals, portraits, designed tombs, and altarpieces—the diverse uses probably trained him best as a decorative artist. His son, Alessandro Mazzola (1533–1608), was an undistinguished painter.

== Selected works ==
Most of Bedoli's works are not signed. Many works are attributed to him based on style, but often these attributions are disputed. Among the works attributed to Bedoli are the following:

Image	Name	Medium	Location
	Adoration of the Kings	oil on canvas	Italy – Parma – Galleria nazionale
	Adoration of the Shepherds with Saint Benedict	oil on panel	France – Paris – Louvre
	Allegorical Portrait of Parma Embracing Alessandro Farnese	oil	Italy – Parma – Galleria nazionale
external image	Allegory of the Immaculate Conception	drawing	France – Paris – Louvre
	Annunciation	oil on canvas	Italy – Naples – Museo di Capodimonte
external image	Bacchus	drawing	England – Cambridge – Fitzwilliam Museum
	Christ as Judge on the Last Day	fresco	Italy – Parma – Cathedral
external image	Conversion of Saint Paul	oil on canvas	Italy – Mantua – Palazzo Ducale
external image	Female Caryatid	drawing	England – Cambridge – Fitzwilliam Museum
external image	Head of a Woman	drawing	England – Cambridge – Fitzwilliam Museum
	Holy Family	oil on panel	Hungary – Budapest – Museum of Fine Arts
external image	Holy Family	oil on canvas	Denmark – Copenhagen – Statens Museum for Kunst
external image	Holy Family with Saint John the Baptist and an Angel	drawing	U.S.A. – Massachusetts – Cambridge – Fogg Museum
	Holy Family with Saint John the Baptist and Angels	oil on panel	Italy – Naples – Museo di Capodimonte
	Holy Family with Saints	oil on panel	Italy – Naples – Museo di Capodimonte
	Immaculate Conception		Italy – Parma – Cathedral
external image	Infant Jesus and Saint John the Baptist	oil on panel	England – Royal Collection
	Infant Jesus and Saint John the Baptist	oil	unknown (sold 2010 by Los Angeles County Museum of Art)
	Martyrdom of Saint John the Evangelist		Italy – Mantua – Palazzo Ducale
external image	Meeting of Joachim and Anna at the Golden Gate	drawing	U.S.A. – Illinois – Art Institute of Chicago
	Mystic Marriage of Saint Catherine of Alexandria	oil on canvas	Italy – Parma – Galleria nazionale
	Mystic Marriage of Saint Catherine of Alexandria		Italy – Parma – Church of San Giovanni Evangelista
	Pentecost		Italy – Parma – Sanctuary of Santa Maria della Steccata
external image	Portrait of a Boy of the Bracciforte Family	oil	U.S.A. – Rochester – Memorial Art Gallery
	Portrait of a Musician	oil on panel	U.S.A. – Missouri – Saint Louis Art Museum
external image	Portrait of a Tailor	oil on canvas	Italy – Naples – Museo di Capodimonte
external image	Portrait of a Young Man	oil	Austria – Vienna – Kunsthistorisches Museum
external image	Princes Praying	oil	England – Yorkshire – Castle Howard
external image	Putto Seated on a Frame	drawing	U.S.A. – New York – Metropolitan Museum of Art
	Saint Clare	oil on canvas	Italy – Naples – Museo di Capodimonte
	Saint Mary Magdalene	oil on panel	Italy – Florence – Palazzo Pitti
	Saint Thecla	drawing	Italy – Milan – Pinacoteca Ambrosiana
	Seated Man in a Niche with Violoncello	drawing	Italy – Naples – Museo di Capodimonte
external image	Standing Female Figure and Ornamental Framework	drawing	U.S.A. – New York – Metropolitan Museum of Art
	Study for the Virgin in the Steccata Pentecost	drawing	Italy – Milan – Pinacoteca Ambrosiana
	Virgin and Child	drawing	England – Cambridge – Fitzwilliam Museum
external image	Virgin and Child	drawing	England – Cambridge – Fitzwilliam Museum
	Virgin and Child in Landscape	oil on panel	U.S.A. – Massachusetts – Cambridge – Fogg Museum
	Virgin and Child with Saint John the Baptist	oil on canvas	Denmark – Copenhagen – Statens Museum for Kunst
external image	Virgin and Child with Saint John the Baptist and Saint James	drawing	France – Paris – Louvre
external image	Virgin and Child with Saint John the Baptist, Saint Sebastian and Saint Francis	oil on panel	Germany – Dresden – Gemäldegalerie
external image	Visitation	oil	Italy – Reggio Emilia – Church of Santa Maria della Visitazione
