= List of paintings in the Galleria Nazionale di Capodimonte =

This is a list of the paintings (not complete), dating from between 1200 and 1800, housed in the Galleria Nazionale di Capodimonte, Naples, Italy.

== A–M ==
Painter	Work	Date for work	Link
Niccolò dell'Abbate	Portrait of a youth with a book	1545–1550	
Francesco Albani	St. Elizabeth in glory	1603–1604	
Antonio Allegri (il Correggio)	Saint Joseph and a Devotee	−1529	
Antonio Allegri (il Correggio)	Mystical night of St. Catherine	1517–1518	
Antonio Allegri (il Correggio)	Madonna with Child (la Zingarella)	1515–1516	
Michelangelo Anselmi	Adoration by shepherds	1526–1528	
Michelangelo Anselmi	Portrait of gentleman Giovan Battista Castaldi	1530–1540	
Michelangelo Anselmi	Nativity	−1527	
Michelangelo Anselmi	Madonna with Child, Magdalen, & St. Apollonia	−1525	
Sofonisba Anguissola	Self-Portrait at a Spinet (harpsichord)	1554–1555	
Unknown painter from Campania	St. Maria de Flumine	c.1290	
Unknown Rhenish sculptor	Memento mori	early-17th century	
Unknown Lombard	Lucretia	1515–1520	
Unknown Ferrarese	Emperor		
Jacob de Backer	Vice of Envy	1570–1575	
Jacob de Backer	Vice of Melancholy or Sloth	1570–1575	
Jacob de Backer	Vice of Pride	1570–1575	
Jacob de Backer	Vice of Extravagance or Lust	1570–1575	
Jacob de Backer	Vice of ire or wrath	1570–1575	
Jacob de Backer	Vice of Gluttony	1570–1575	
Jacob de Backer	Vice of Greed	1570–1575	
Sisto Badalocchio	Resurrection of Christ	c.1620	
Sisto Badalocchio	Deposition	1618–1620	
Jacopo de' Barbari	Portrait of Luca Pacioli	−1495	
Fra Bartolomeo	Assumption of the Virgin	1516	
Fra Bartolomeo	Profile of Figure Reading	c. 1499	
Joachim Beuckelaer	City Market	1566	
Joachim Beuckelaer	Marketplace with fish	1570	
Girolamo Mazzola Bedoli	Seated Man in Niche with Violoncello	1542	
Girolamo Mazzola Bedoli	Portrait of a Tailor	1540–1545	
Girolamo Mazzola Bedoli	Holy Family with John the Baptist and Angels	1530–1535	
Girolamo Mazzola Bedoli	Holy Family and Saints	c.1535	
Girolamo Mazzola Bedoli	Saint Claire	1535–1540	
Girolamo Mazzola Bedoli	Annunciation	1555–1560	
Giovanni Bellini	Circumcision of Christ	−1566	
Stefano Della Bella	Medici Urn		
Giovanni Bellini	Transfiguration	1478–1479	
Giovanni Battista Benvenuti (l'Ortolano)	Pietà	c.1520	
Herri met de Bles (il Civetta)	Landscape with Seastorm	−1531	
Herri met de Bles (il Civetta)	Landscape with St. Peter	−1531	
Herri met de Bles (il Civetta)	Landscape with Moses before burning bush	−1531	
Herri met de Bles (il Civetta)	Landscape with the good samaritan	−1531	
Herri met de Bles (il Civetta)	Landscape with Christ tempted by Satan	−1531	
Herri met de Bles (il Civetta)	Good Samaritan	−1531	
Pieter Boel	Still life with hunted animals	mid-17th century	
Sandro Botticelli	Madonna & child & 2 angels	1468–1469	
Pieter Bruegel the Elder	Misanthrope	−1568	
Pieter Bruegel the Elder	Parable of the blind	−1568	
Bronzino	Holy family	c. 1560	
Bronzino	Portrait of lady	1550–1560	
Michelangelo Buonarroti, copy of	Venus with Love	mid-16th century	
Michelangelo Buonarroti	Study of armed men	c.1546	
Giovan Battista Caracciolo (Battistello)	Christ at the Column	1625	
Jacques Callot	Sketch of project for Triumph-table or Fountain	1615–17	
Luca Cambiaso	Venus & Adonis	pre-1585	
Luca Cambiaso	Death of Adonis	pre-1585	
Polidoro da Caravaggio	Transport of Christ to Sepulchre	c.1527	
Caravaggio	Flagellation of Christ	1607–1609	
Polidoro da Caravaggio	Walk to Calvary	−1533	
Girolamo da Carpi or Girolamo de Vincenti	Portrait of Gentleman in Black	−1535	
Annibale Carracci	Portrait of Musician	−1587	
Annibale Carracci	Group of Angels	c. 1600	
Annibale Carracci	Hercules at a Crossroads	−1596	
Annibale Carracci	Bacchus	1590–1591	
Annibale Carracci	Allegory of a River	1593–1594	
Annibale Carracci	Annunciation; Madonna with Child and St. Francis of Assisi	c. 1600	
Annibale Carracci	Vision of St. Eustachius	1585–1586	
Annibale Carracci	Satyr	1588–1589	
Annibale Carracci	St. Francis of Assisi	1585–1590	
Ludovico Carracci	Rinaldo and Armida	−1593	
Annibale Carracci	Rinaldo and Armida	c. 1601	
Annibale Carracci	Mystical Night of St. Catherine	c. 1585	
Annibale Carracci	Pietà	−1598	
Annibale Carracci	Farnese silver plate with Drunken Silenus	1597–1600	
Agostino Carracci	Holy Family with St. Margaret	c.1600	
Agostino Carracci	Portrait Lute Player	1585–1586	
Agostino Carracci	Democritus	c.1598	
Agostino Carracci	St. Jerome	c. 1600	
Agostino Carracci	The wolfman from the Canaries, Arrigo Gonzalez; the court buffoon, Pietro Matto & the dwarf, Rodomonte with menagerie animals	c.1598	
Battistello Caracciolo	Madonna of the Souls in Purgatory	1622–1625	
Giovanni Benedetto Castiglione (il Grechetto)	Circe	1650–51	
Bernardo Cavallino	Study of male nude	1635–40	
Bernardo Cavallino	Denial by St. Peter	1638–1640	
Bernardo Cavallino	Songstress	1645–50	
Giorgio Giulio Clovio	Portrait of Settimia Jacobacci	c.1550	
Colantonio	St. Jerome in His Studio	c.1445	
Colantonio	Delivery of the Franciscan Rule	c.1446	
Piero di Cosimo	Feminine Head in Profile	1500–10	
Lucas Cranach the Elder	Christ & the adulterer	1525–1550	
Francesco Curia	Annunciation	−1596	
Johan Christian Dahl	Landscape of Royal Casina of Quisisana	−1820	
Dirk Hendricksz (known as Teodoro d’Errico)	Madonna of the Rosary	−1578	
Michele Desubleo	Ulysses & Nausicaa	post 1654	
Domenico Zampieri (il Domenichino)	Guardian angel	−1614	
Dosso Dossi	Sacred Conversation	c. 1510	
Albrecht Dürer	Crossing	1496–98	
Aniello Falcone	Head of Warrior and Study of Helmet	c. 1640	
Aniello Falcone	Charity of St. Lucy	c. 1630	
Pedro Fernandez	Adoration by Magi, Visitation, Nativity	c. 1510	
Sebastiano Filippi (Bastianino)	Madonna with Child	1565–1570	
Rosso Fiorentino	Portrait of Youth	c.1529	
Luca Forte	Still life with Cherries, Strawberries and Pears	c. 1640	
Franciabigio	St. Bruno	c. 1515	
Franciabigio	St. Bartolomeo	c. 1515	
Artemisia Gentileschi	Judith Slaying Holofernes	1625–1630	
Corrado Giaquinto	Aeneas & the Sybil	1739–1741	
Luca Giordano	Sacrifice by Manoah	1656–60	
Luca Giordano	Madonna of the Baldacchino	c. 1686	
Luca Giordano	Mars and Venus with Cupid	1663	
Luca Giordano	Lucrezia & Tarquin	−1663	
Matteo di Giovanni	Massacre of the Innocents	1480–90	
Francesco Guarino	St. Cecilia at the Organ	c.1640	
Giovanni Francesco Barbieri (Guercino)	St. Jerome	1640–1650	
Jacob Philipp Hackert	Ferdinando IV coot-hunting in lake Fusaro	−1783	
Jacob Philipp Hackert	Harvest Time at Carditello	1791	
Antonio Joli	Ferdinando IV on horseback with court	post 1760	
Angelica Kauffman	Portrait of the Royal family of Naples	−1783	
Angelica Kauffman	Ferdinand I and His Family	−1782	
Thomas de Keyser	Portrait of young man	−1646	
Giovanni Lanfranco	Salvation of a Soul	c.1613	
Giovanni Lanfranco	Madonna with Child behind Saints Maria Egiziaca and Margaret	1620–1621	
Giovanni Lanfranco	Madonna with Child and Saints Augustine and Dominic	1613–14	
Giovanni Lanfranco	Jesus Served by Angels	c. 1605	
Giovanni Lanfranco	Assumption of the Magdalen	c.1605	
Giovanni Lanfranco	Sketch of Carthusian saint	c. 1637	
Claude Lorrain	Landscape with the Nymph Egeria	−1669	
Lorenzo Lotto	Portrait of Bernardo de' Rossi, Bishop of Treviso	−1505	
Lorenzo Lotto	Madonna with Child and St. Peter Martyr	−1503	
Bernardino Luini	Madonna with Child	1510–1520	
Pedro Machuca	Death & Assumption of the Virgin	c.1520	
Andrea Mantegna	Portrait of Francesco Gonzaga	c. 1461	
Simone Martini	St. Ludovico of Toulouse	−1317	
Masaccio	Crucifixion	−1426	
Masolino da Panicale	Foundation of St. Maria Maggiore	c. 1428	
Masolino da Panicale	Assumption of the Virgin	c. 1428	
Master of San Severino	Polyptych of San Severino Noricense	c.1472	
Master of the Annunciation	Annunciation to the Shepherds	1625–1630	
Paolo de Matteis	Self-portrait	post 1714	
Guido Mazzoni	Bust of Alfonso of Aragon, Duke of Calabria or Ferrante II of Aragon	1492–1493	
Francesco Mazzola (il Parmigianino)	Holy family	1525–1527	
Francesco Mazzola (il Parmigianino)	Portrait of Galeazzo Sanvitale	1524	
Francesco Mazzola (il Parmigianino)	Lucrezia	1539–1540	
Francesco Mazzola (il Parmigianino)	Portrait of Young Woman (L'Antea)	1530–1535	
Francesco Mazzola (il Parmigianino)	Cupid standing	1527–1530	
Andrea Meldolla (lo Schiavone)	Jesus Before Herod		
Anton Raphael Mengs	Portrait of Ferdinand IV	c. 1760	
Sebastiano Mainardi	Madonna with Child & young St. John and three angels	1400–90	
Girolamo Mirola	Battle of the Sabines and Romans (fresco)	post 1563	
Domenico Morelli	Iconoclasts	−1855	
Francesco De Mura	Vision of St. Benedict	c.1710	

== N–Z ==
Painter	Work	Date for work	Link
Roberto di Oderisio	Crucifixion	c. 1335	
Lelio Orsi	St. George and the Dragon	1565–1570	
Palma il Vecchio	Sacred Conversation with Donor	c. 1525	
Giovanni Paolo Pannini	Charles of Bourbon visits Benealso	−1746	
Giovanni Paolo Pannini	Charles of Bourbon Visiting St Peter's Basilica	−1746	
Giovanni Paolo Pannini	Charles of Bourbon Visiting Pope Benedict XIV at the Coffee House del Quirinale	−1746	
Giovan Francesco Penni	Madonna of the divine Love	−1518	
Raffaello Piccinelli (Brescianino)	Madonna with Child & young St. John	c. 1510	
Marco Pino	Adoration of the Shepherds	c.1555	
Sebastiano del Piombo	Portrait of Clement VII with beard	post 1527	
Sebastiano del Piombo	Madonna of the Veil	1533–1535	
Sebastiano del Piombo	Portrait of Clement VII	pre-1527	
Pisanello	Medal of Lionello d’Este	−1444	
Anton Sminck Pitloo	Veduta of Ischia with the Castello Aragonese	c.1824	
Anton Sminck Pitloo	Temple of Paestum	1824–25	
Pontormo	Sacrificial Scene	c.1545	
Giovanni Antonio de' Sacchis (Il Pordenone)	Dispute of the Immaculate Conception	c.1529	
Paolo Porpora	Flowers with crystal vase	c.1655	
Mattia Preti	Saint Sebastian	c.1657	
Mattia Preti	Banquet of Absalom	c.1657	
Mattia Preti	Study for the cupola of the church of San Biagio in Modena	1653–56	
Mattia Preti	Madonna of Constantinople	c.1656	
Giulio Cesare Procaccini	Madonna with Child & an angel	1610–1612	
Domenico Puligo	Madonna with Child and Young St. John	1510–15	
Marcantonio Raimondi (copy of Giulio Romano)	Angelica and Medoro	−1516	
Giovanni Battista Ramenghi (Bagnacavallo)	Madonna with Child & young St. John	1540–1550	
Giuseppe Recco	Still life with fishes	c.1680	
Giuseppe Recco	Still life with fish	c.1680	
Rembrandt van Rijn	Judith decapitates Holofernes	1650–55	
Guido Reni	Atlanta and Hippomenes	1620–1625	
Guido Reni	Study of a Robed Figure	1617-18	
Jusepe de Ribera (lo Spangoletto)	Penitent Magdalene	1618–1623	
Jusepe de Ribera (lo Spagnoletto)	Head of Grotesque Mask	c. 1622	
Jusepe de Ribera (lo Spagnoletto)	Terrestrial Trinity and Saints	1626–1630	
Jusepe de Ribera (lo Spagnoletto)	Drunken Silenus	−1626	
Jusepe de Ribera (lo Spagnoletto)	Saint Jerome and the Angel of Judgement	−1621	
Sebastiano Ricci	Assumption of the Magdalen	1687–1688	
Giulio Romano	Madonna of the Cat	c. 1523	
Francesco de' Rossi (Il Salviati) (il Cecchino)	Sacrifice by Alexander	c. 1550	
Francesco de' Rossi (Il Salviati) (il Cecchino)	Portrait of a gentleman	c. 1545	
Peter Paul Rubens (copy of)	St. George & the dragon	post 1602	
Giovan Battista Ruoppolo	Still life with garden produce	c. 1660	
Andrea da Salerno	St. Nicola of Bari in throne	c.1514	
Maso da San Friano	Male Portrait	−1556	
Ferdinando Sanfelice	Study for the sepulchre of Gaetano Argento in St. Giovanni a Carbonara	1730	
Fabrizio Santafede	Adoration of the Shepherds	1612–1613	
Raffaello Sanzio (Raphael)	Portrait of Cardinal Alessandro Farnese	1509–1511	
Raffaello Sanzio (Raphael)	Madonna of Divine Love	1517–1518	
Raffaello Sanzio (Raphael)	Moses before the burning bush	c.1514	
Andrea del Sarto	Study of Figure genuflecting turning to left	1528–30	
Andrea del Sarto	Madonna with Child & young St. John & angels	post 1518	
Andrea del Sarto	Portrait of Leo X with two cardinals	−1525	
Carlo Saraceni	Landscape with flight of Icarus	1606–1607	
Carlo Saraceni	Landscape with burial of Icarus	1606–1607	
Carlo Saraceni	Landscape with Salmace and hermaphrodite	1606-1067	
Carlo Saraceni	Landscape with rape of Ganymede	1606–1607	
Carlo Saraceni	Landscape with death of Icarus	1606-1067	
Carlo Saraceni	Landscape with Ariadne Abandoned	1606–1607	
Cristoforo Scacco	Coronation of the Virgin with Saints Mark and Julian	1495–1500	
Bartolomeo Schedoni	Holy family & Saints	1607–1611	
Bartolomeo Schedoni	Ecce Homo	1609	
Bartolomeo Schedoni	St. Sebastian healed before women	−1615	
Bartolomeo Schedoni	Portrait of Vincenzo Grassi	1613–1614	
Bartolomeo Schedoni	Cupid	1610–1612	
Bartolomeo Schedoni	Charity	−1611	
Bartolomeo Schedoni	Announcement of the massacre of the Innocents	1609–1610	
Daniel Seghers	Madonna with Child within flower garland	first half 17th century	
Carlo Sellitto	St. Cecilia at the organ	1613	
Cesare da Sesto	Adoration by the Magi	1516–1519	
Cesare da Sesto	Christ Suffering and the cardinal Oliviero Carafa	pre-1511	
Francesco Solimena	Study of youth	1728	
Francesco Solimena	Martyrdom of Giustiniani in Scio	1710–15	
Francesco Solimena	Aeneas and Dido	c.1741	
il Sodoma	Resurrection of Christ	1534	
Antonio Solario (lo Zingaro)	Madonna with Child and Donor	1500–1510	
Jan Soens	St. Cecilia and the Vision of St. John	c. 1590	
Jan Soens	Jove and Antiope	1580–1590	
Jan Soens	Allegory of the Tablet of the Theban Cebes	1575–1587	
Jan Soens	Baptism of Christ	1585	
Massimo Stanzione	Sacrifice by Moses	1628–1630	
Massimo Stanzione	Horn Player	c.1640	
Titian	Portrait of Man with Order of the Golden Fleece	1549	
Titian	Portrait of Young Woman	1545–1546	
Titian	Portrait of Pierluigi Farnese in Armor	c. 1546	
Titian	Portrait of Pope Paul III with Unhooded Cape	1543	
Titian	Penitent Magdalene	c.1550	
Titian	Portrait of Philip II	c. 1554	
Titian	Portrait of Cardinal Alessandro Farnese	1545–1546	
Titian	Paul III with Nephews	1545–1546	
Titian	Paolo III with Camauro	1545–1546	
Titian	Danae and Cupid	1544–1546	
Titian	Annunciation	c.1557	
Alessandro Buonvicino (Moretto da Brescia)	Christ at the Column	c.1550	
Alessandro Tiarini	Madonna with Child and Angels	1625–1630	
Pellegrino Tibaldi	Holy family & Saints	1549–1553	
Tintoretto (attributed)	Rough sketch for Battaglia sul Taro	c.1578	
Benvenuto Tisi (il Garofalo)	St. Sebastian	c.1526	
Benvenuto Tisi (il Garofalo)	Madonna with Child & St. Jerome	1510–1512	
Benvenuto Tisi (il Garofalo)	Adoration of the Magi	c. 1540	
Benvenuto Tisi (il Garofalo)	Circumcision	c. 1515	
Gioacchino Toma	Luigia Sanfelice in Jail	−1874	
Gaspare Traversi	Portrait of Cleric	−1770	
Giorgio Vasari	Resurrection of Christ	−1545	
Giorgio Vasari	Allegory of Justice, Truth and Vices (Giustizia Farnese)	−1543	
Andrea Vaccaro	Adoration of the Golden Calf	c.1650	
Perin del Vaga	Deposition	post 1538	
Joos van Cleve	Adoration of the Magi	c.1515	
Johannes Hendrik van den Broek	Venus with Love	1550–1570	
Anthony van Dyck	Crucifixion	1621–1632	
Bernard van Orley	Portrait of Charles V	−1566	
Marcello Venusti	Last Judgement	c.1549	
Bartolomeo Vivarini	Holy Conversation	−1465	
Alvise Vivarini	Madonna with Child, behind Saints Francis & Bernard	−1485	
Daniele da Volterra	Portrait of youth	1540–1560	
Pieter de Witte (Pietro Candido)	Holy family	1584–1585	
Pieter de Witte (Pietro Candido)	Madonna with Child and Young St. John	pre-1585	
Gaspar van Wittel	Veduta of the Monastery of Grottaminarda	c. 1700	
Konrad Witz	Holy conversation	1446–1448	
Giacomo Zanguidi (il Bertoia)	Madonna with Child	1565–1570	
Giacomo Zanguidi (il Bertoia)	Jacob's dream; studies at reverse	c.1546	
