= Frans Mostaert =

Flemish painter

Frans Mostaert (1528–1560) was a Flemish Renaissance painter specializing in landscape paintings.

== Life ==
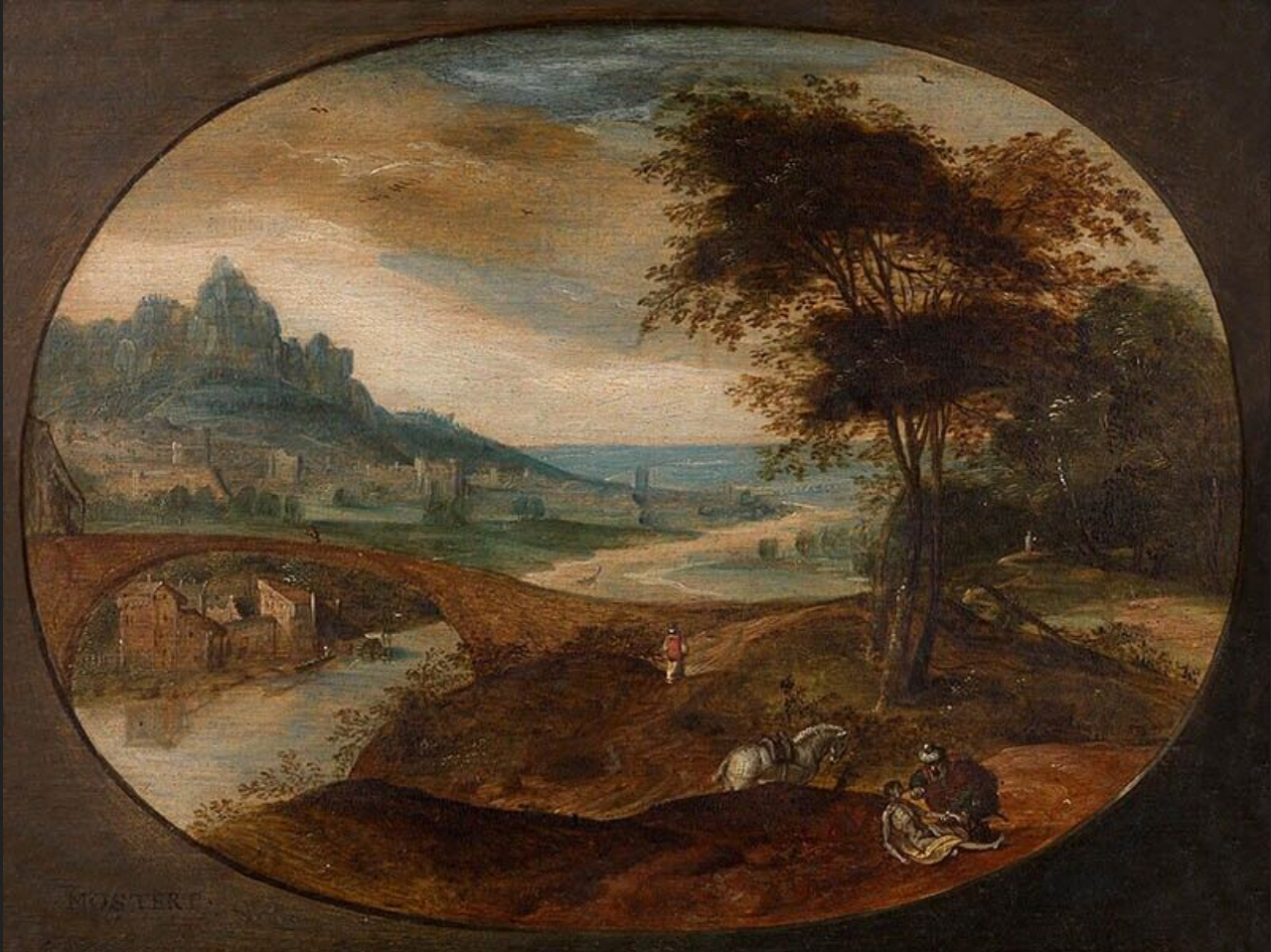
Landscape with the Good Samaritan

Frans Mostaert was born in Hulst. The early biographer Karel van Mander states in his early 1605 Schilder-boeck that Frans Mostaert was the son of a common painter, the twin brother of the painter Gillis Mostaert and the grandson of the painter Jan Mostaert. While his brother Gillis studied landscape painting with Jan Mandijn, Frans became a pupil of the landscape painter Herri met de Bles. Van Mander states that both brothers joined the Antwerp Guild of Saint Luke in 1555. This may be one of the many errors of van Mander since Frans received a registered pupil in 1553. It is therefore more likely that he became a master in the Guild earlier.

Frans Mostaert was the teacher of Jan Soens, Adriaen Rebbens and Bartholomeus Spranger. He died of the plague in Antwerp, after his new pupil Bartholomeus Spranger had been with him only for a few weeks.

== Work ==
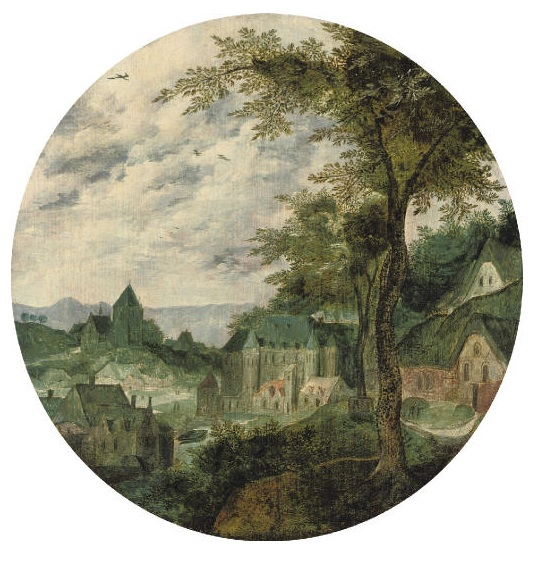
A river landscape with a town, a palace and a church

Frans Mostaert died young. Only very few of his works survive and only one is signed. This is the picture Landscape with the Good Samaritan in the Royal Museum of Fine Arts Antwerp. A second work that has traditionally been attributed to Frans Mostaert is (was) in the Alte Pinakothek, Munich. Christie's sold (14 November 2007 in Amsterdam, lot 60) the picture A river landscape with a town, a palace and a church, which it attributed to Frans Mostaert based on its similarities in style and technique with the compositions found in museums.

All of Frans Mostaert's known works are landscapes. Although he did not study under Patinir, he can be regarded as a follower of Patinir in that he combined realistic and topographical aspects of the landscape with a heroic aspect as shown in the mountain ranges.
