= Jacob Backer =

Jacob Backer may refer to:

- Jacob Adriaensz Backer (1609–1651), Dutch Golden Age painter
- Jacob de Backer (c. 1555–c. 1585), Flemish Mannerist painter and draughtsman
