= Rinaldo and Armida =

Rinaldo and Armida may refer to:

== Paintings ==
- Rinaldo and Armida (Annibale Carracci), c.1601 painting by Annibale Carracci
- Rinaldo and Armida (Hayez), 1813 painting by Francesco Hayez

== Plays ==
- Rinaldo and Armida (play), 1698 tragedy by John Dennis
- Renaud et Armide, 1943 tragedy by Jean Cocteau

== See also ==
- Jerusalem Delivered
- Renaud de Montauban
- Armida
