= Sislej Xhafa =

Kosovan artist

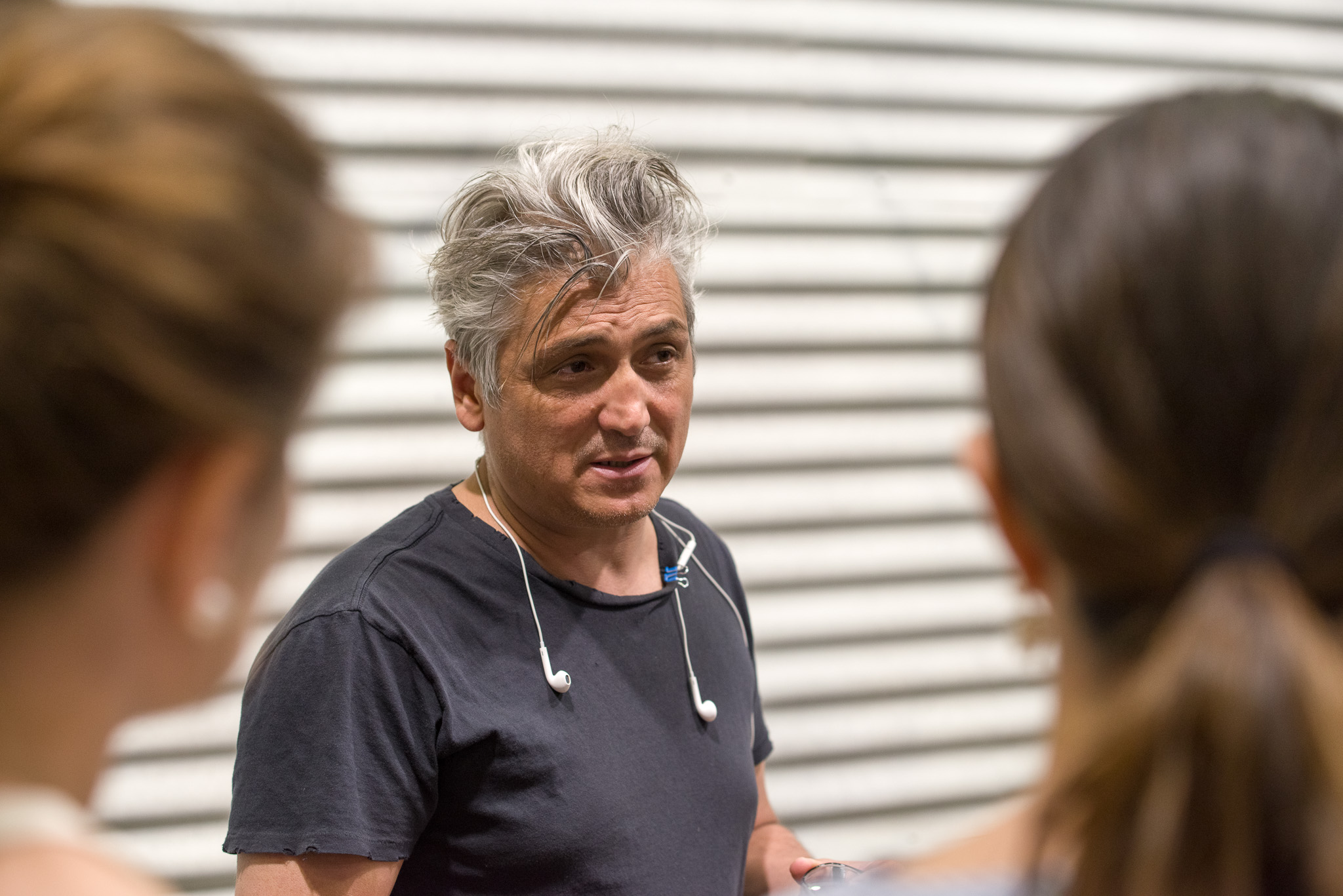
- Sislej Xhafa at Art Basel exhibition (2019)
- Born: 1970 (age 55–56); Peja, Kosovo, Yugoslavia
- Known for: Contemporary art
- Notable work: Padiglione Clandestino Albanese (1997); Pleasure our Flower (2000); Again and Again (2000); Y (2011)

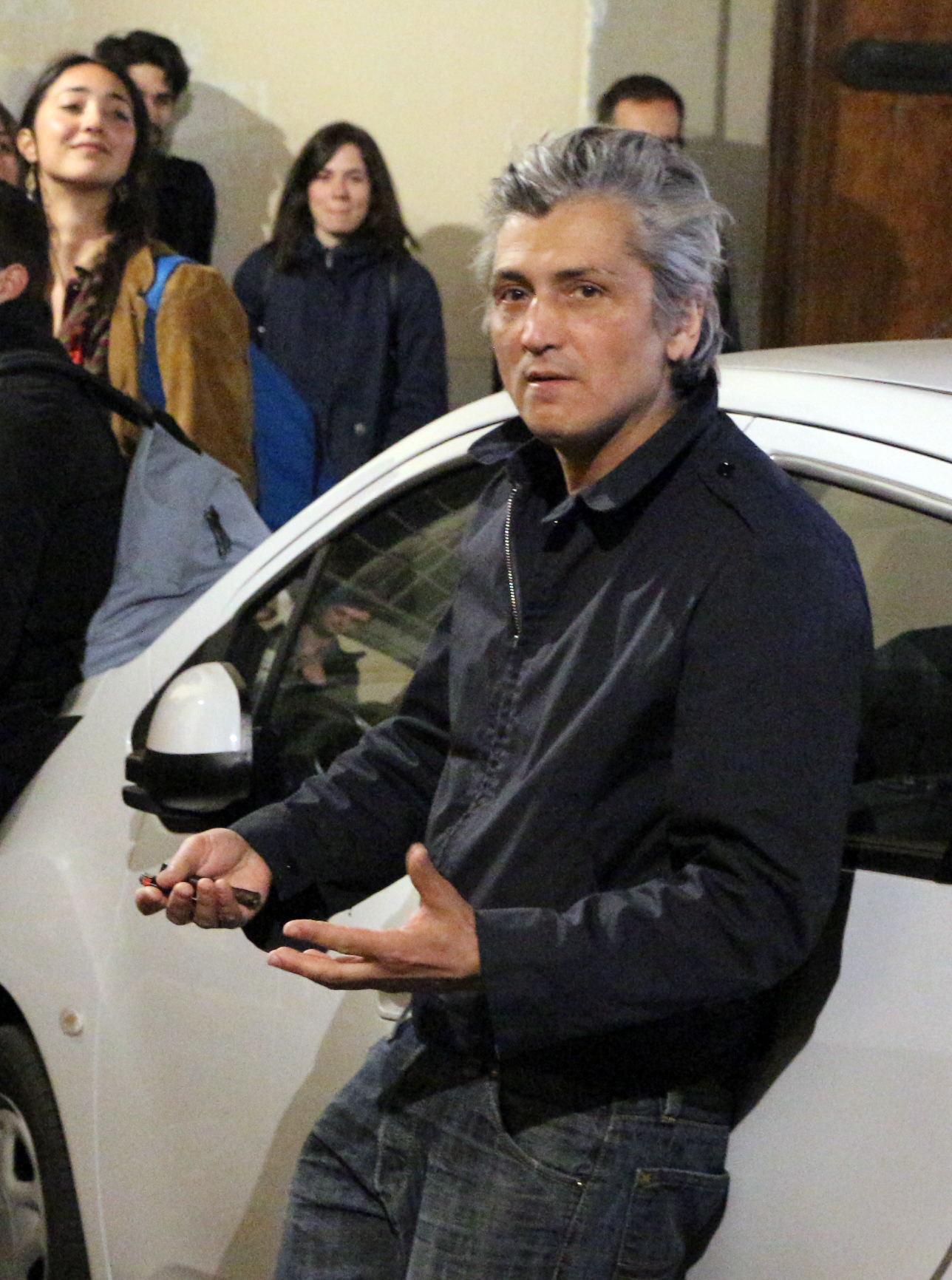
Portrait during a workshop with students of Accademia di Belle Arti in Florence, 2015

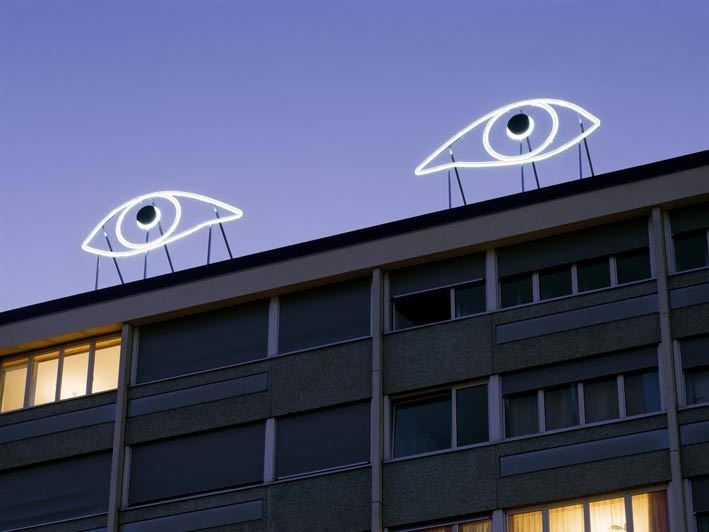
Sislej Xhafa, Axis of Silence, 2009, part of the Neon Parallax public art project, Geneva

Sislej Xhafa (born 1970) is a Kosovar contemporary artist, based in New York.

In a Hatje Cantz Verlag monograph about the artist, art critic Guido Molinari writes "The condition of relentless traveler, throughout the West and beyond, allows Sislej Xhafa to keep in constant touch with current social, economic and aesthetic shifts and pour these back into his own works. The relationship between him and these international mutations is void of any rhetoric or politically correct solutions. It takes shape, rather, through the development of complex, but mainly light, conceptual strategies. Approaching humor at times, by means of a clear-cut point of view reversal or unexpected elaboration on a simple stereotype, the work offers an insight into the core of social unease without triggering rejection mechanisms. Xhafa's aim, indeed, is to give our minds tiny rushes of energy, without the deadlock of excess shock value."

He is represented by Galleria Continua, San Gimignano / Beijing / Les Moulins / Havana / Rome / São Paulo / Paris / Dubai

== Exhibitions ==
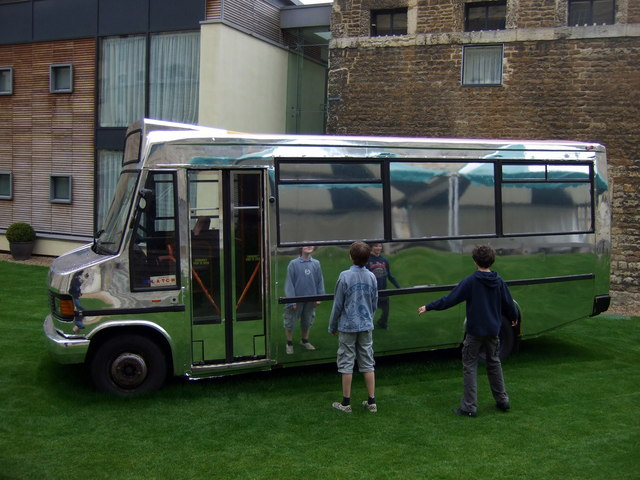
Elegant Sick Bus at Modern Art Oxford

Xhafa has exhibited widely, including:

- Nicola Trussardi Foundation ITALIA 70 – I NUOVI MOSTRI (THE NEW MONSTERS), Milan, Italy (2024)
- Manifesta 14, Frosted Pocket, Pristina, Kosova (2022)
- Galleria Continua Bride on Soil, Les Moulins, Boissy-Le-Châtel, France
- Museum of Contemporary Art in Kraków, MOCAK Politics in Art, Kraków, Poland
- UNLIMITED Art Basel, Ovoid Solitude, Basel, Switzerland (2019)
- Aargauer Kunsthaus, Mask in Present-Day Art, Aarau, Switzerland
- Museo Nacional de Bellas Artes de La Habana, ROSA AZUL, Havana, Cuba (2018)
- National Gallery of Kosovo, Love You Without Knowing , Pristina, Kosova
- MAXXI, National Museum of 21st Century Arts Benvenuto Rome, Italy (2016);
- Italian Pavilion of the 55th Venice Biennale Vice Versa Venice Biennale, Venice, Italy (2013)
- 21st Century Museum of Contemporary Art, Kanazawa Borderline: Collection Exhibition II, Kanazawa, Japan (2013)
- MADRE Museum of Contemporary Art Donna Reggina Still Untitled, Naples, Italy (2012)
- Pinault Collection The World Belongs to You, Palazzo Grassi, Venice, Italy
- Hardau City Park Y, Zurich, Switzerland
- The Power Plant Rearview Mirror, Toronto, Canada (2011)
- PRISM Misericordia, West Hollywood, California, United States
- MAXXI Spazio. Dalle collezioni di arte e architettura, Rome, Italy
- Il Museo Privato. La passione per l'arte contemporanea nelle collezioni bergamasche GAMeC, Bergamo, Italy
- Röda Sten 2705 Baci… Göteborg (2010), MART Rovereto; Museo di Arte Moderna e Contemporanea di Trento e Rovereto, Language and Experimentations
- PAC Padiglione d'Arte Contemporanea, Milano Ibrido. Genetica delle forme
- DEPO Indefinite Destinations, Istanbul, Turkey
- MADRE Barock, Naples, Italy (2009)
- Havana Biennial, Havana, Cuba
- Modern Art Oxford Transmission Interrupted, Oxford, England, United Kingdom
- Gwangju Biennale, Gwangju, South Korea
- Museum of Contemporary Art Detroit Business As Usual, Detroit, Michigan, United States
- Schirn Kunsthalle Frankfurt All-Inclusive. A Tourist World, Frankfurt, Germany (2008)
- Istanbul Museum of Modern Art Time Present, Time Past, Istanbul, Turkey
- Göteborg International Biennial for Contemporary Art Rethinking Dissent, Gothenburg, Sweden
- Mori Art Museum All About Laughter Humor in Contemporary Art, Tokyo, Japan (2007)
- PERFORMA05 performance biennial, New York (2005)
- I Bienal de Arte Contemporáneo de Sevilla, Fundación BIACS, La alegria de mis sueños, Monasterio la Cartuja de Santa María de las Cuervas, Seville, Spain
- The Renaissance Society, New Video, New Europe, Chicago, Illinois, United States
- Contemporary Art Museum St. Louis, St. Louis, Missouri, United States
- Tate Modern, London, England
- Stedelijk Museum Amsterdam, Amsterdam, Netherlands
- North Dakota Museum of Art, Grand Forks, North Dakota, United States
- Fundació 'la Caixa' la Sala Montcada, Barcelona, Spain
- Haifa Museum of Art, Haifa, Israel (2004)
- Palais de Tokyo, Paris, France (2003)
- Gwangju Biennale, Pause, Gwangju, South Korea (2002)
- Istanbul Biennial, Egofugal, Istanbul, Turkey
- Stedelijk Museum voor Actuele Kunst (S.M.A.K.), Casino, Ghent, Belgium
- PS1, Uniform, Queens, New York City, New York, United States (2001)
- Manifesta III, Ljubljana, Slovenia
- Stedelijk Museum voor Actuele Kunst (S.M.A.K.), Over the Edges, Ghent, Belgium (2000)
- Venice Biennale (1997, 1999, 2005, 2013 and 2017)

== Awards ==
- Honorary Title from the Accademia di belle arti di Firenze, Firenze, Italy 2022
- Hardau City Park Y, Zürich; Supported by City of Zürich, ZHDK and IFCAR 2009-2011
- "Axis of Silence" in collaboration with Contemporary Art Fund of the City and Canton of Geneva (Fmac and FCAC) Plaine de Plainpalais; Geneva 2008
- Fondazione Pistoletto, Biella 2001
- Fondazione Querini Stampalia, Premio Querini- Furla per l'Arte, Venice 2000
- Onufri National Gallery, Tirana 1999
