= List of museums in Naples =

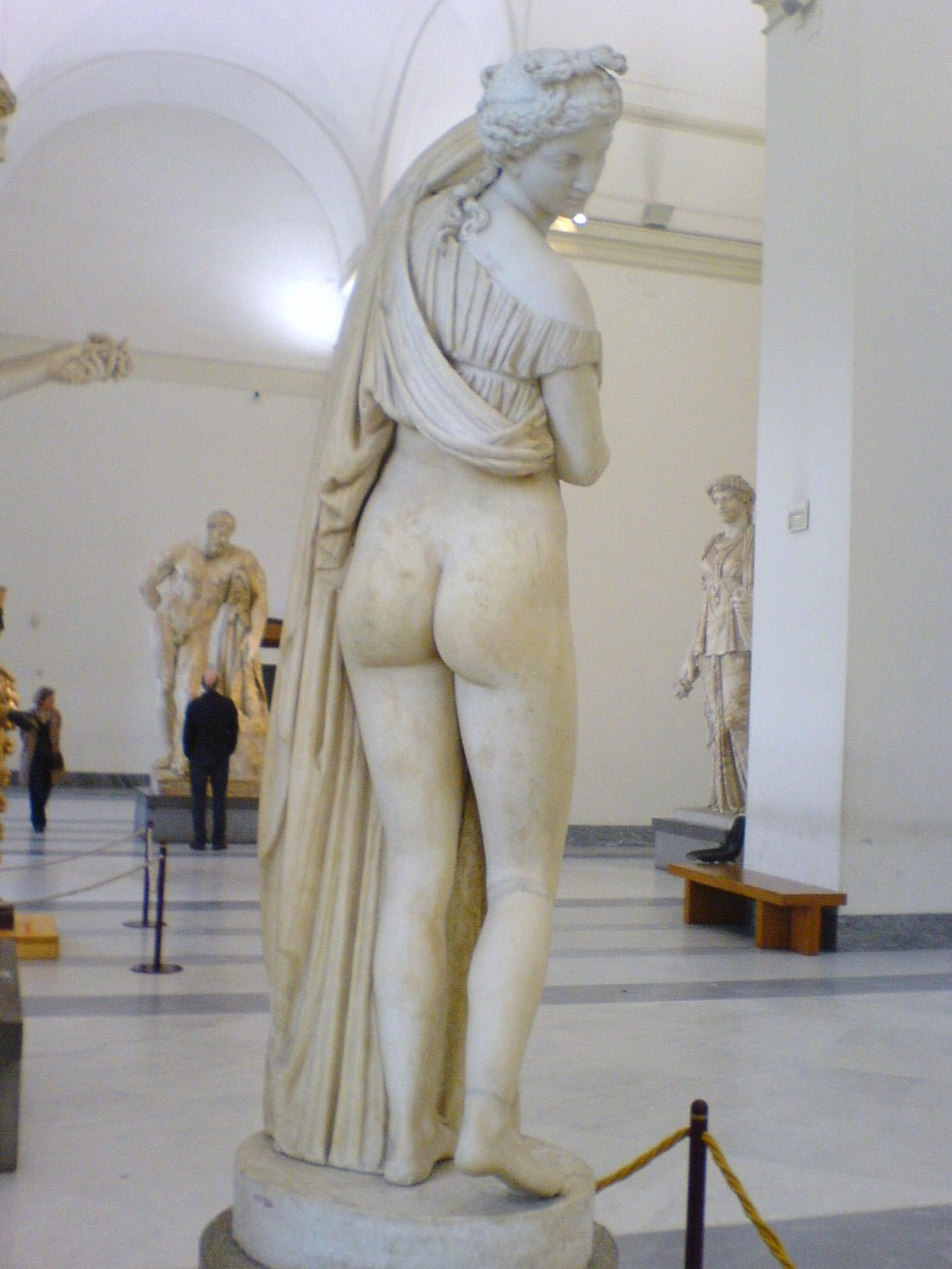
The Venus Kallipygos, in the Naples National Archaeological Museum.

The Italian city of Naples has a number of museums. Two are national museums: the National Archaeological Museum or Museo Archeologico Nazionale di Napoli, which holds significant collections of artifacts of the Roman Empire, including objects unearthed at Pompeii and Herculaneum, as well as some artifacts from the Greek and Renaissance periods; the Museo di Capodimonte contains the Galleria Nazionale di Capodimonte, with paintings of the Neapolitan School and from elsewhere in the Italian Peninsula.

== List ==
An incomplete brief list of museums in Naples:

Name	Genre	Date	Description	Image
Museo di Capodimonte	museum, art gallery (painting, sculpture, plastic arts, decorative arts)	first collections started in 1738, expanded 1787	Found in the Palace of Capodimonte, it is arguably one of the city's most important art galleries and museums in the city of Naples. The first artistic collections go back to 1738, with the Bourbon King Charles VII of Sicily and Naples (who later became Charles III of Spain). As time went on, more and more art was collected, and finally, the gallery is currently a museum, which exhibits classical, Renaissance, Baroque and more modern art, sculptures, porcelain and majolica plates and decorations.	
National Archaeological Museum	classical (ancient Greek and Roman, mainly) artifacts	1585, 1750s	Founded in 1585, it is an important archaeological museum, however, was established by Spanish and Neapolitan king Charles III in the mid-18th century. It contains classical sculptures and artifacts mainly collected in the archaeological sites of Pompeii and Herculaneum, which were discovered in the 1750s.	
Secret Museum of Naples	private artifacts from Pompeii	1819, closed in 1849, and re-opened in 1960	Another museum in the city, it exposes explicit material found in Pompeii. It was closed down in 1849, yet re-opened in 1960.	? (no available image)
Certosa di San Martino	medieval and renaissance	Museum since 1866, building finished in 1368	The museum is located in the former living quarters of the prior and the monks’ cells in the monastery complex Certosa di San Martino (St. Martin's Charterhouse) on the hill of Sant’Elmo on the Vomero. In over 70 halls, it displays exhibits from different eras of Naples’s city history. There are paintings and sculptures from the 13th to the 19th century as well as a folk art section, a marine- and a Vesuvius section, as well as a famous collection of Neapolitan nativity scenes.	
Zoological Museum of Naples	zoology, animals	1813	One of the city's principle museums with zoological collections, it was opened in 1813 by Joachim Murat. Later, the museum was ruined during World War II, yet, was restored from 1948 to 1970.	
Museo Civico Filangieri	plastic arts, applied arts	1882	Created by the prince Gaetano Filangieri the museum collects applied arts made by neapolitan artisans and artists, including paintings, wood sculptures, majolicas, porcelains, glasses, textiles, arms and armors, medals, and presepi (terracotta figurines of shepherds from Nativity Scene).	
Museo d'Arte Contemporanea Donnaregina	contemporary art	2007	was born from a joint project by the region of Campania, The Italian Ministry of Culture and European Community. It is located in the restored historical palace of Donnaregina and collects masterpieces of contemporary artists such as Andy Warhol, Alberto Burri, Lucio Fontana, Robert Mapplethorpe, Francesco Clemente, Jannis Kounellis, Giulio Paolini, Richard Serra, Jeff Koons, Richard Long, Rebecca Horn, Alfredo Pirucha, Domenico Paladino, Piero Manzoni.	
Palazzo Arti Napoli	Civic Museum and Exhibit Hall of the City of Naples Events	2005	The so-called "PAN" is one of the civic museum of Naples. It is located in the 16th-century Roccella Palace. It was born as a public exhibition center for the civic collections of arts, and to host art and culture events organized by the City of Naples.	
Città della Scienza	science museum	1996	The Museum of Science of Naples, called "Città della Scienza" was created by a consortium of public and private investors called "Fondazione IDIS". It is located in Bagnoli, in one of dismissed areas of steelworks foundry industry. Its original nucleus was built into 19th-century workshops, examples of industrial archeology. It is aimed at transmitting science culture mainly to a public of students and young people, and to testimony examples of sustainable technologies. The old Science centre was burnt in an arson, march 4, 2013. Actually it's composed by Corporea, Planetarium and an area for Sea and Insects.	
Museo degli Strumenti Astronomici	science museum	2012	The Museo degli Strumenti Astronomici of the Astronomical Observatory of Capodimonte in Naples is the only national astronomical museum in South-Central Italy.	
