= The Vision of Saint Eustace (Carracci) =

Painting by Annibale Carracci

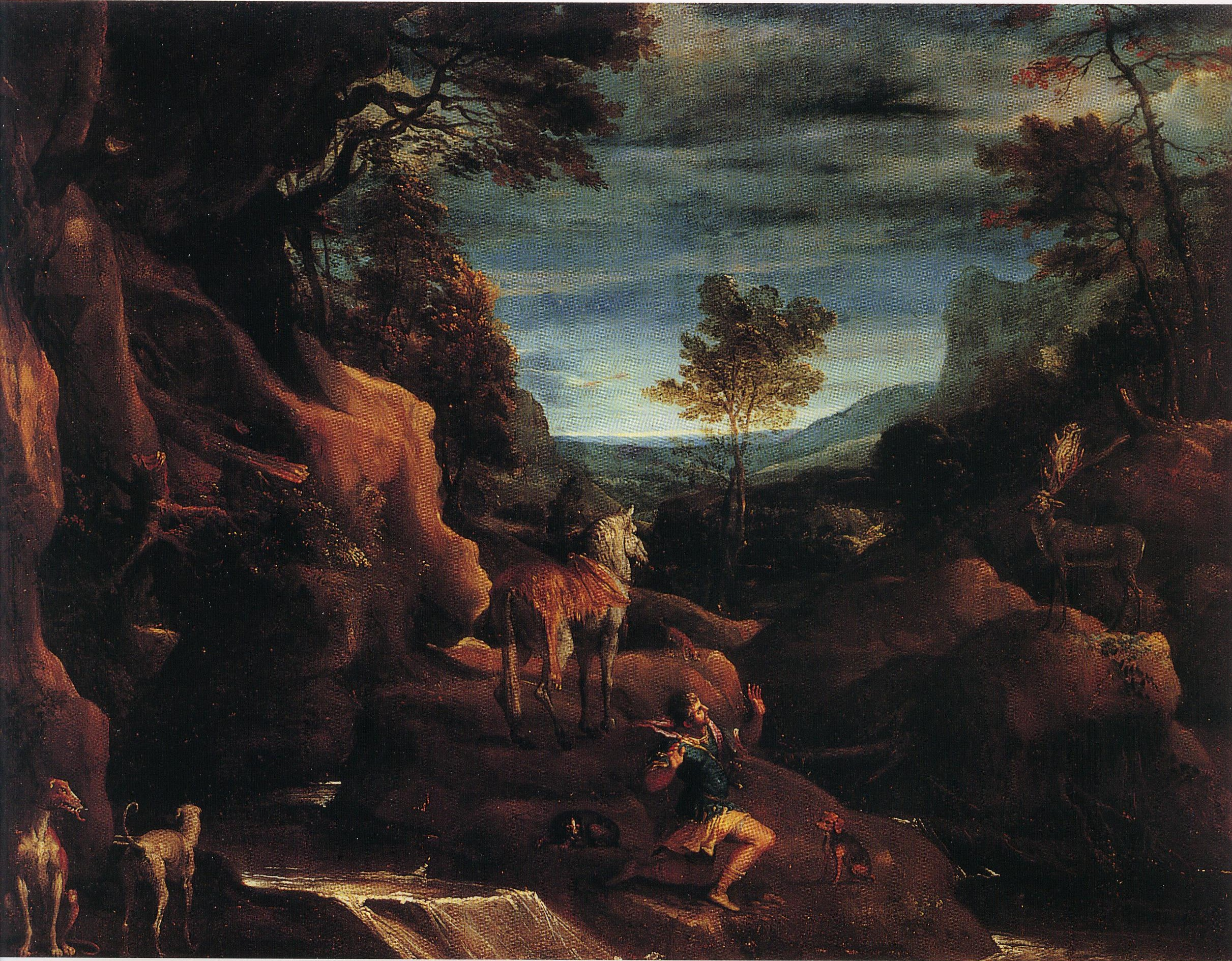
- Artist: Annibale Carracci
- Year: 1585-1586
- Medium: oil on canvas
- Dimensions: 86 cm × 113 cm (34 in × 44 in)
- Location: National Museum of Capodimonte, Naples

The Vision of Saint Eustace is a painting by Annibale Carracci, showing Saint Eustace and his vision of a crucifix between the horns of a stag whilst out hunting. The saint is set in one of the first landscapes by any of the Carracci brothers, showing how he was influenced by Venetian landscape painting until about 1598 after a stay in the city in 1587 and 1588. Specific influences include Titian's Penitent Saint Jerome (Louvre) and the naturalism of Jacopo Bassano. Critics argue the composition is based on two prints by Cornelis Cort, a Flemish printer - Penitent St Jerome and The Vision of Saint Eustace. These prints were in turn based on ideas by the Lombard painter Girolamo Muziano, who was also influenced by Venetian models. The dogs and some other details are drawn from Saint Eustace, an engraving by Albrecht Dürer of the same subject.

It is generally dated to 1585-1586 due to its stylistic similarities with other more-securely dated works from those years by the artist. It is theorised that the painting was taken to Rome by the artist to give to cardinal Odoardo Farnese, who became titular cardinal of the Basilica of Sant'Eustachio in 1595, the same year as Carracci moved to Rome permanently to work for Odoardo. It remained in the Farnese collection, moving initially to Parma and then to Naples, where it finally ended up in its present home in the National Museum of Capodimonte in Naples.

== Other images ==
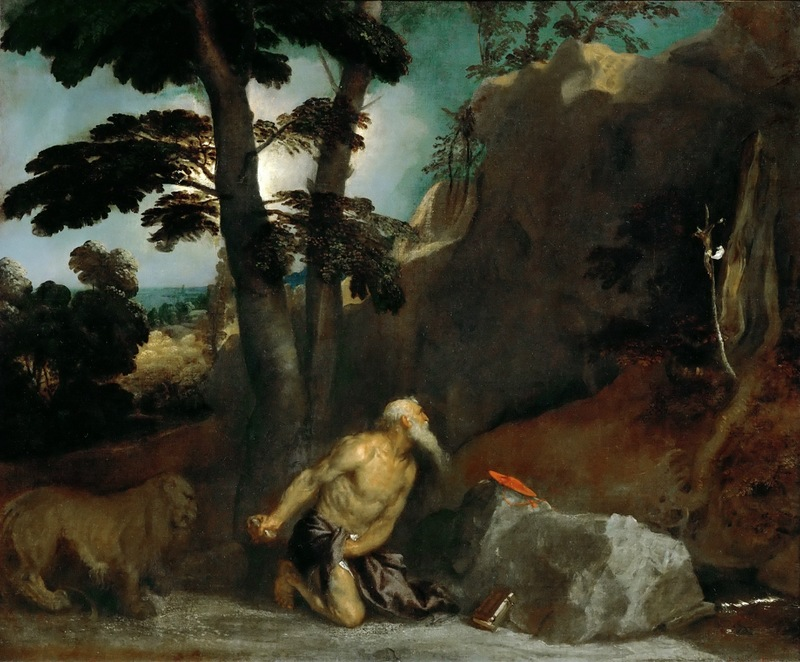
Titian, Penitent Saint Jerome, c. 1531, Louvre, Paris

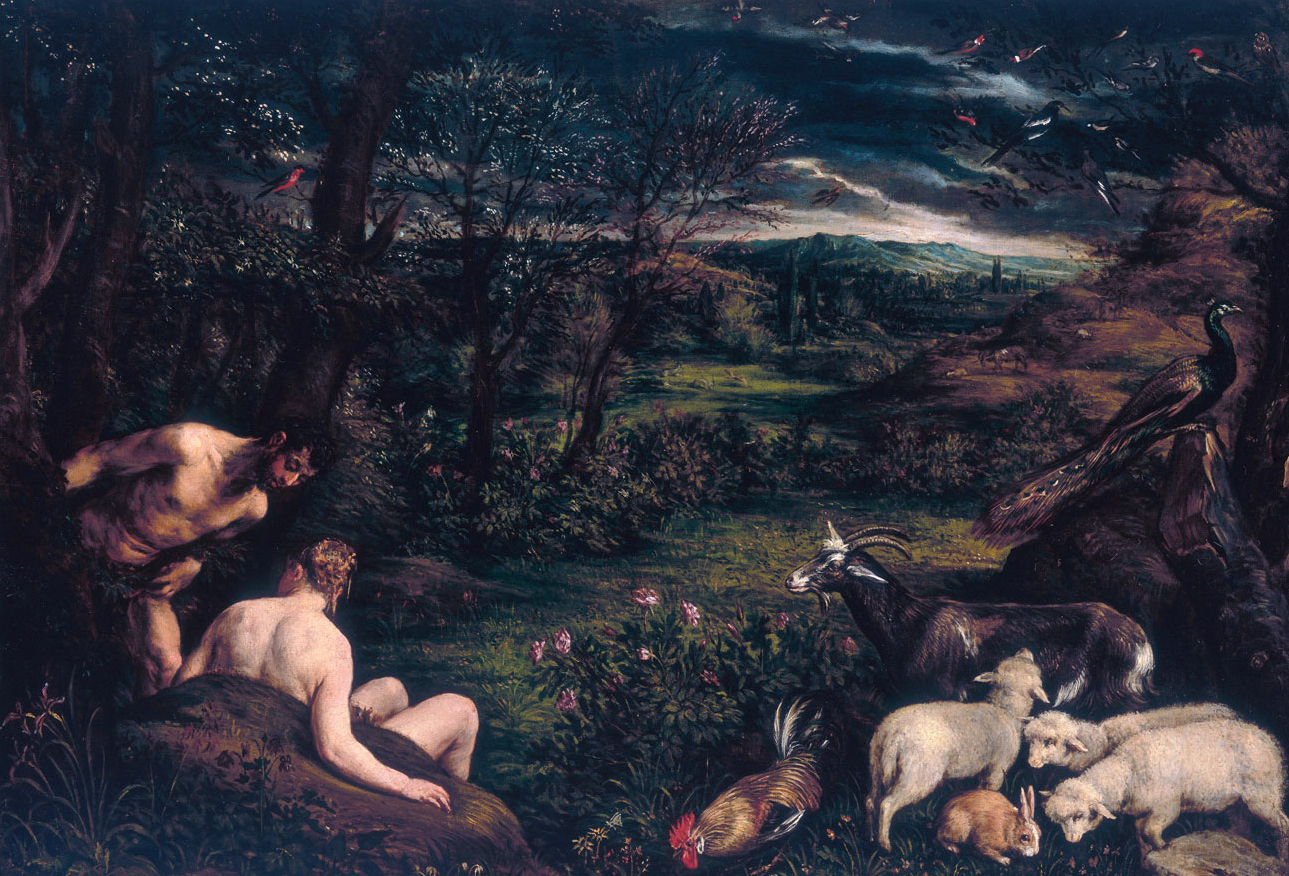
Jacopo Bassano, Earthly Paradise, c. 1573, Galleria Doria Pamphilj, Rome

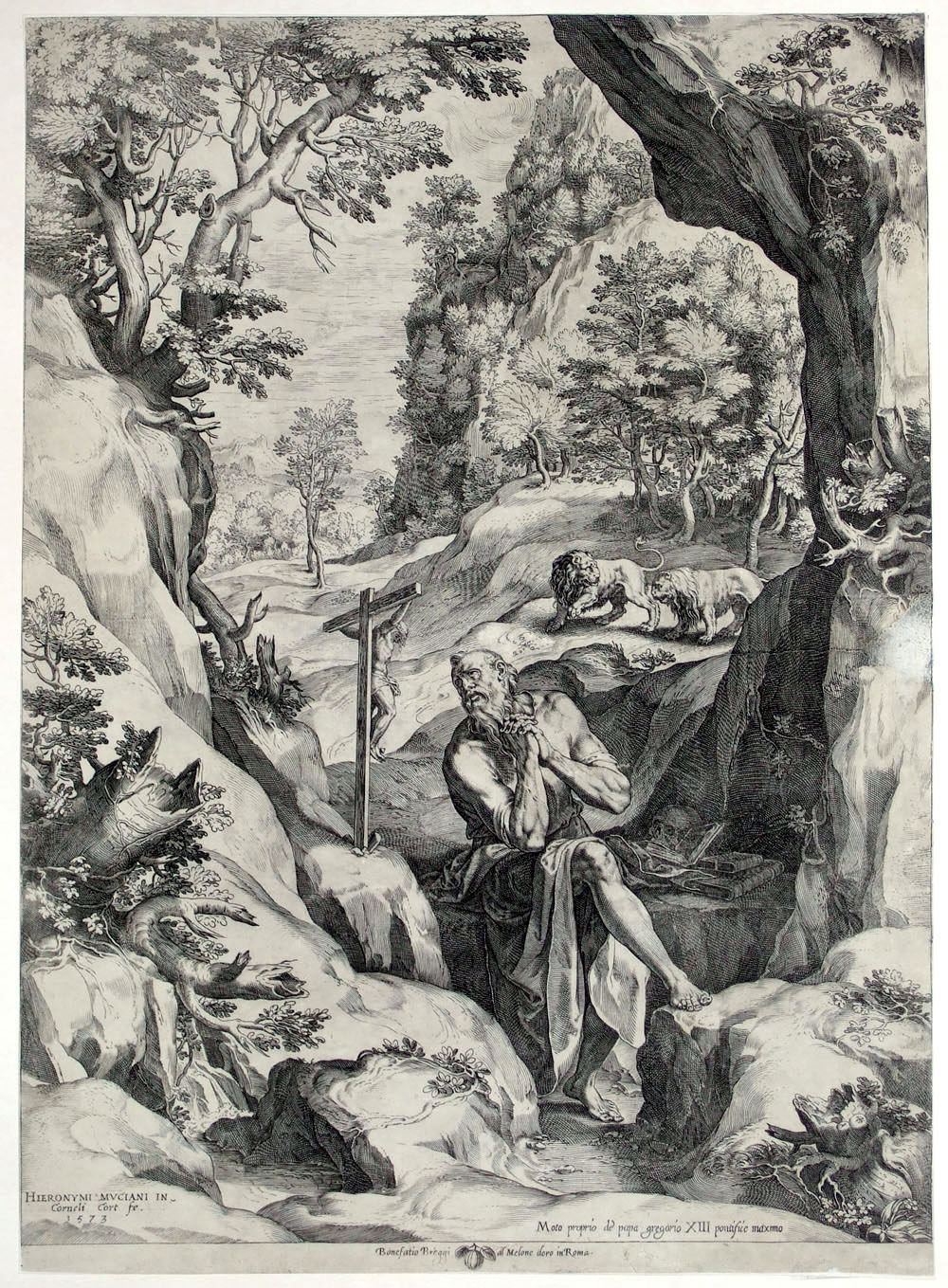
Cornelis Cort after Girolamo Muziano, Penitent Saint Jerome, 1573, University Library, Tartu, Estonia

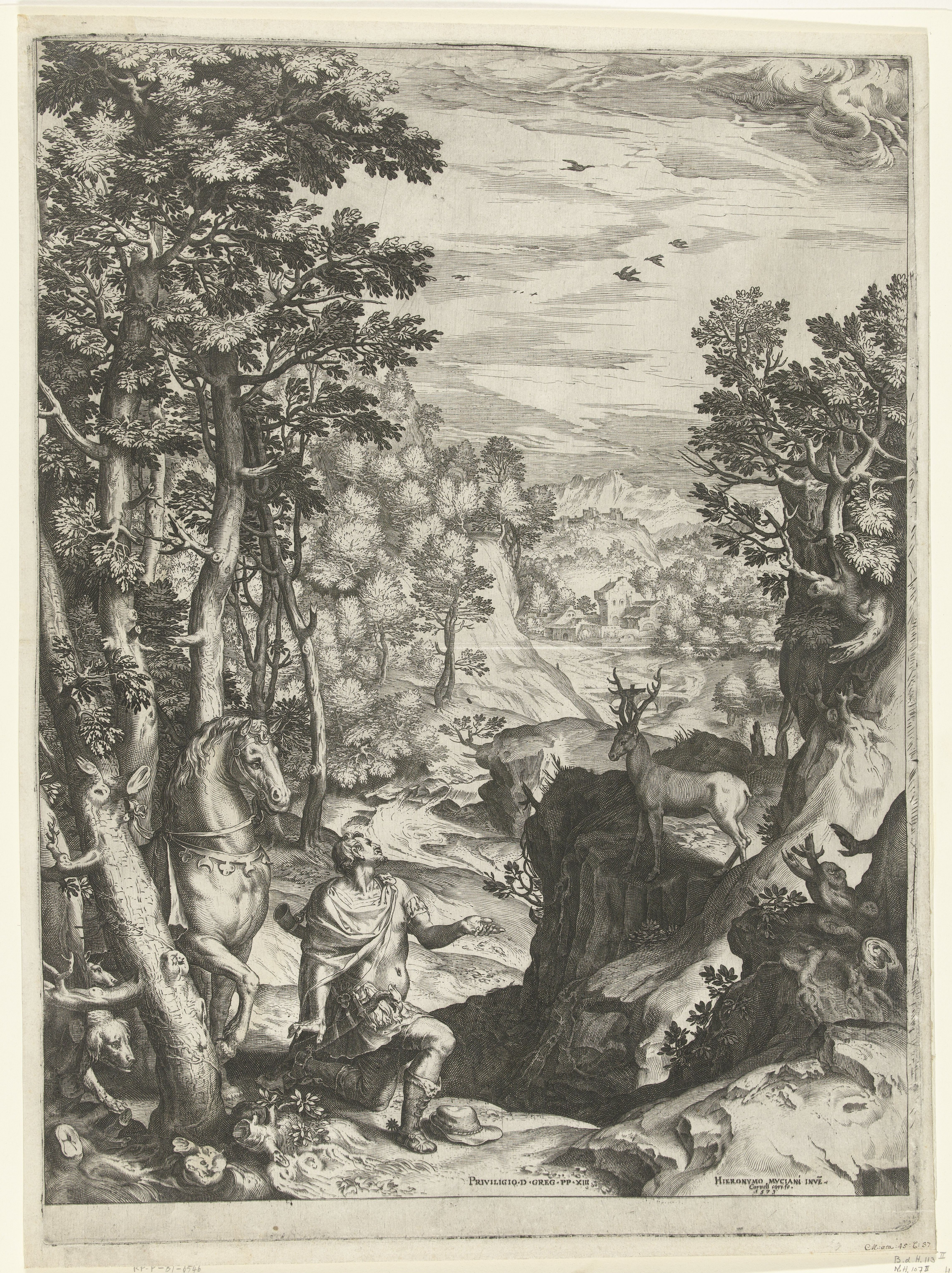
Cornelis Cort after Girolamo Muziano, Vision of Saint Eustace, 1573, Rijksmuseum, Amsterdam

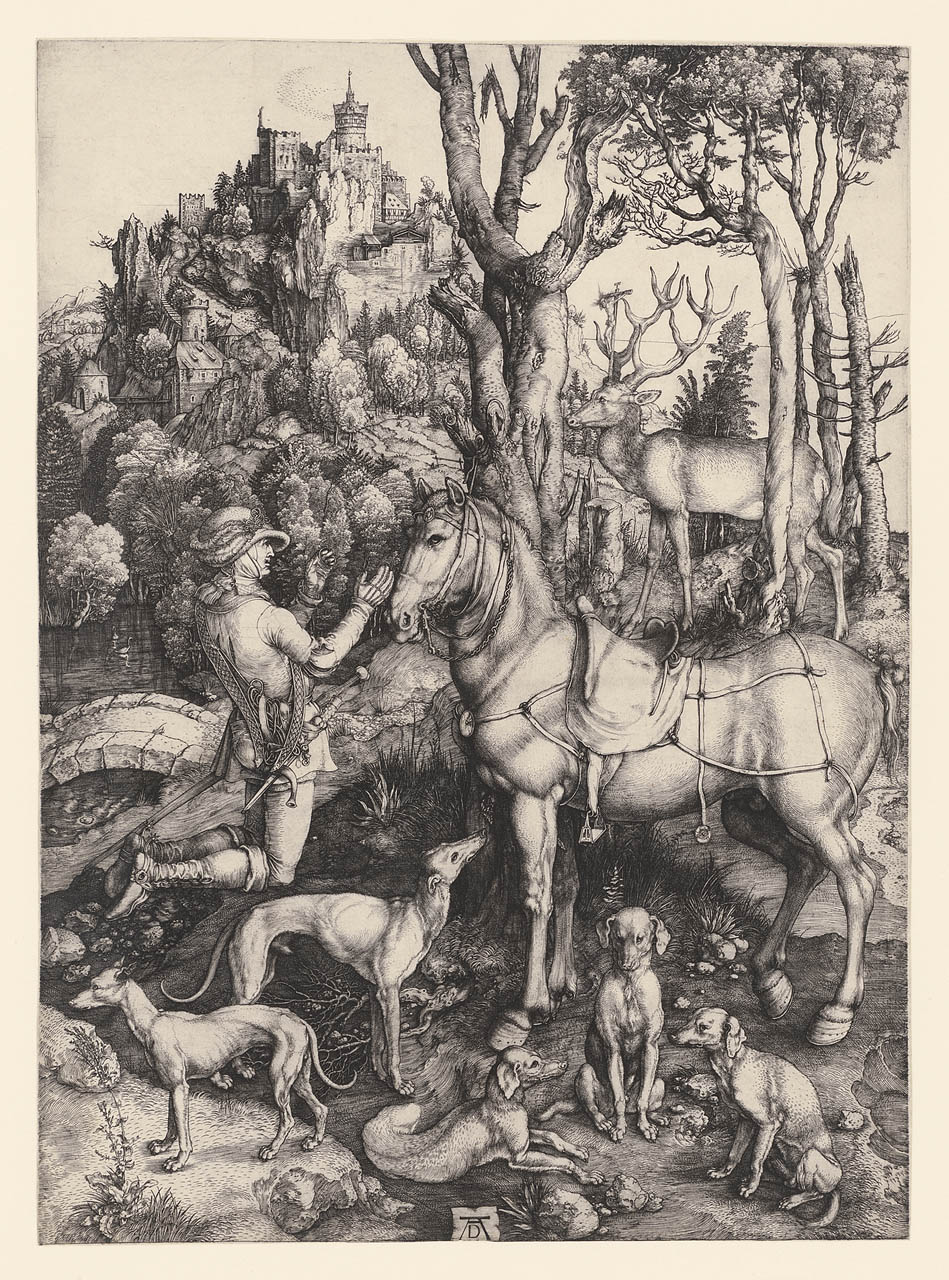
Albrecht Dürer, Vision of Saint Eustace, c. 1501, Rijksmuseum, Amsterdam
