= Portrait of Philip II =

Painting by Titian

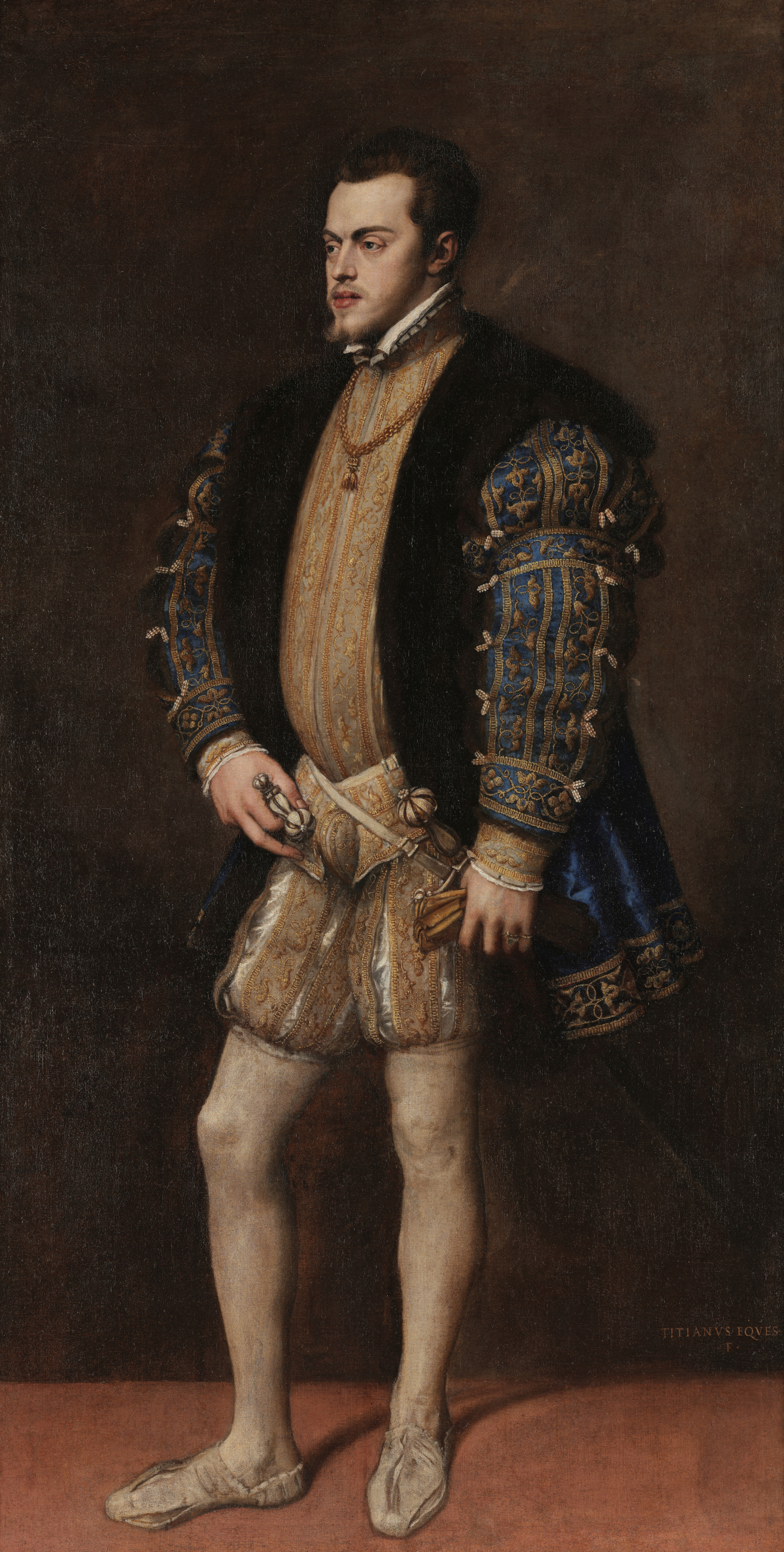
- Artist: Titian
- Year: c. 1550–1554
- Medium: oil on canvas
- Location: Museo di Capodimonte, Naples

Portrait of Philip II is an oil on canvas portrait by Titian of Philip II of Spain wearing the chain of the Order of the Golden Fleece. It is in the collection of the Museo di Capodimonte, in Naples.

It was produced c. 1550–54 judging by the age at which its subject is shown, though its precise dating is unclear - Philip met the artist in Milan in 1549 during the monarch's first trip to Italy, and again between 1550 and 1551 in Augsburg. Titian drew on his own Philip II in Armour (Prado Museum) for the work, which may have been produced around 1554.

An autographed copy of the Naples work hangs in the Palazzo Pitti, in Florence.
