= Penitent Magdalene (Ribera) =

Painting by Jusepe de Ribera

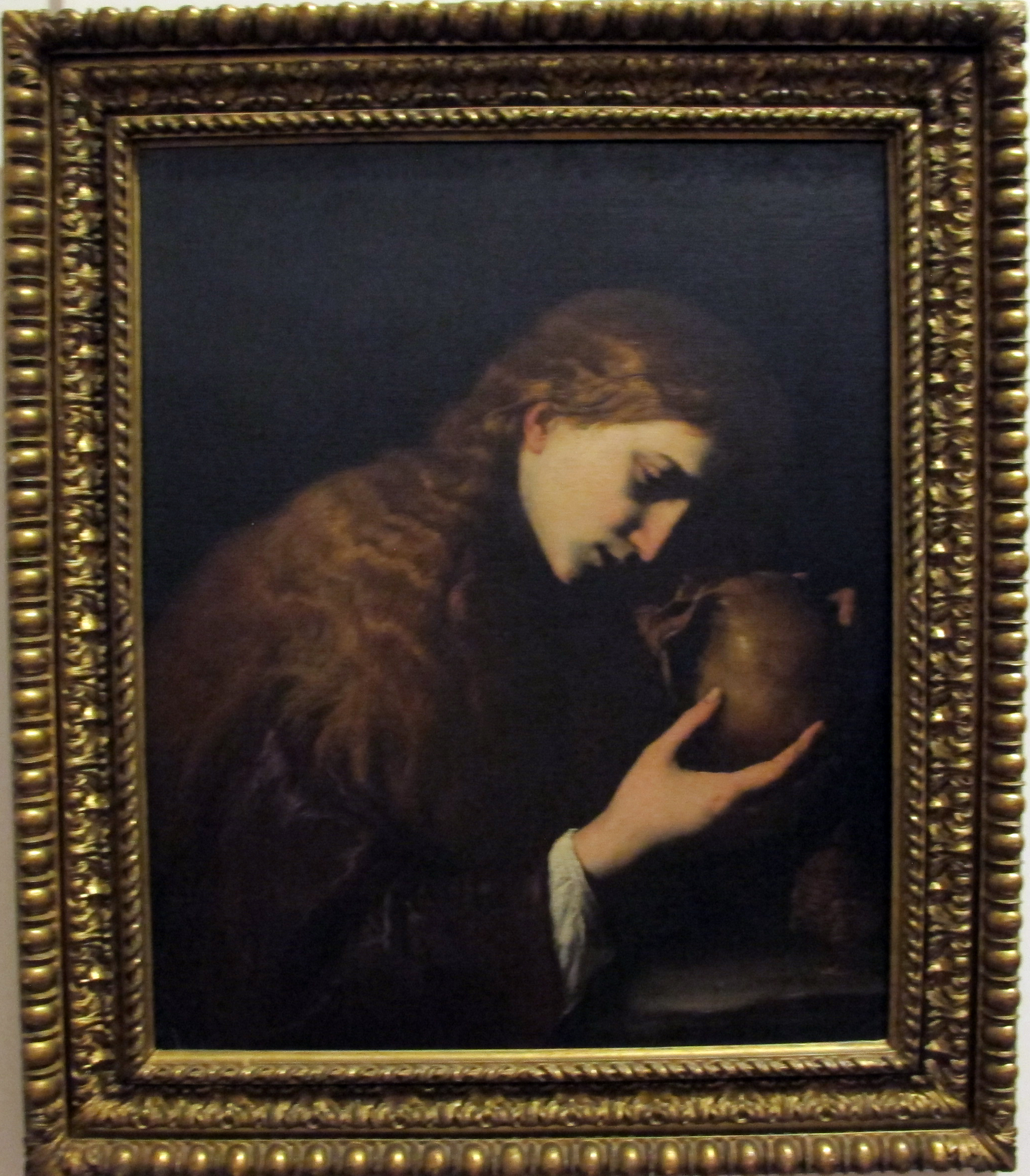

Penitent Magdalene is a 1618-1623 oil on canvas painting by Jusepe de Ribera, now in the Museo nazionale di Capodimonte in Naples.

Its commissioner is unknown, but it was in Angelo Costa's collection in Genoa until 1961 before shifting to the Colnaghi stores in London, where it stayed until 1972, when it was sold to a private collector in Florence, from whom it passed to its present owner.
