= Allegory of Justice =

Painting by Giorgio Vasari

Allegory of Justice (1543) by Giorgio Vasari

Allegory of Justice is an oil-on-panel painting by the Italian Renaissance artist Giorgio Vasari. The painting was commissioned on 6 January 1543 by cardinal Alessandro Farnese for the main room of the Palazzo della Cancelleria in Rome, and was executed the same year. It and the rest of the Farnese collection were later moved to Naples and it is now in the National Museum of Capodimonte.
