= Madonna of Divine Love =

Painting by Raphael

- Madonna del Divino amore (Italian)
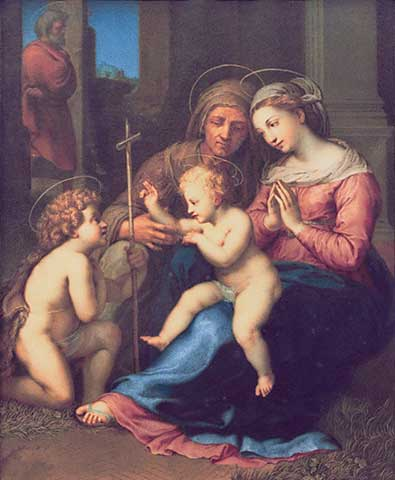
- Artist: Raphael
- Year: 1516–c.1518
- Medium: oil on wood
- Dimensions: 140 cm × 109 cm (55 in × 43 in)
- Location: National Museum of Capodimonte, Naples

The Madonna of Divine Love is a c.1516-1518 oil on wood painting by Raphael, now in the National Museum of Capodimonte in Naples.

It depicts Saints Mary and Elizabeth with the baby Jesus and a genuflecting Saint John holding a cross of reeds. Jesus, assisted by Saint Elizabeth, appears to be blessing Saint John. In the shadows stands Saint Joseph.

Vasari mentions a work produced by Raphael for Leonello Pio da Carpi, Lord of Meldola and a future cardinal - this is accepted as Madonna of Divine Love. It was then acquired in 1564 by Alessandro Farnese and in 1624 it entered the overall Farnese collection in Parma in 1624 and later in Naples. It was briefly acquired by the Bourbons and taken to Madrid.

== Sources ==
- https://web.archive.org/web/20160622035629/http://cir.campania.beniculturali.it/museodicapodimonte/itinerari-tematici/galleria-di-immagini/OA900088
- https://www.kulturarv.dk/kid/VisVaerk.do?vaerkId=185166
- Article includes some text based on the equivalent article on Italian Wikipedia.
