= Saint Jerome in Penitence (Titian, 1531) =

c. 1531 painting by Titian

St. Jerome in Penitence
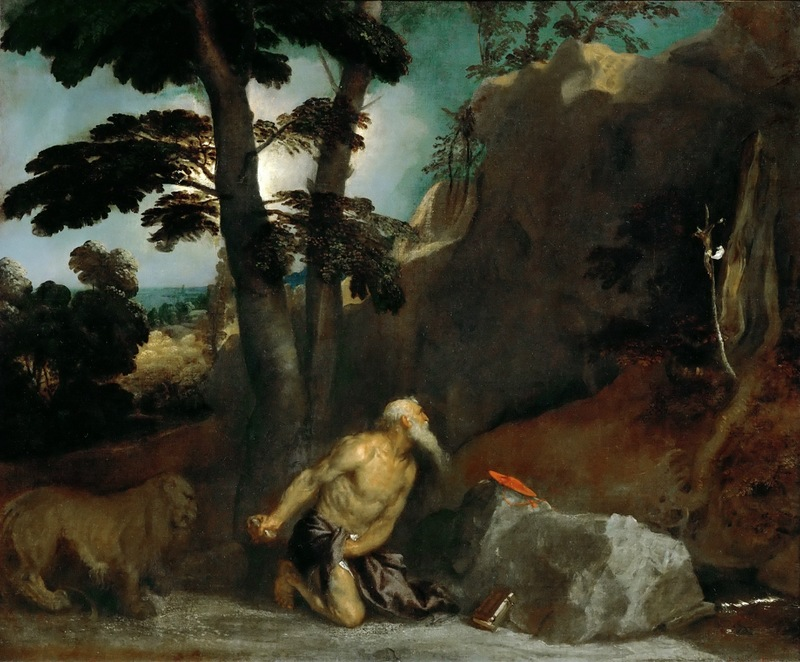
- Artist: Titian
- Year: c. 1531
- Medium: oil paint, canvas
- Dimensions: 80 cm (31 in) × 102 cm (40 in)
- Location: France

Saint Jerome in Penitence or Penitent Saint Jerome is an oil on canvas painting by Titian, from c. 1531. It is held in the Louvre, in Paris.

== History ==
The painting was first mentioned in the collections of Louis XIV and may have come from the Gonzaga collection, perhaps making it the Saint Jerome mentioned in Federico Gonzaga's correspondence, which can be dated to 1531. A second theory argues that the work was intended for Federico's mother Isabella d'Este, who wanted a nocturnal scene.

== Description ==
Saint Jerome is depicted as a hermit in the desert, engaged in penance, beating his chest with a stone while addressing a prayer to the crucifix hanging on a stick at the top right. Behind him is the inevitable tamed lion and the cardinal's hat, as well as the book of the Vulgata. Compared to the previous representations of the subject, Titian renewed the pathos of the scene with an innovative lighting, which highlights some details while leaving in the shade some less significant, but still necessary in the iconography. Thus Jerome is exalted by the powerful lighting, as is the crucifix, who is struck by a ray of light. In the landscape, a luminous source in the distance creates innovative effects of prominence, giving the grove a restless and mysterious atmosphere.

== Sources ==
- (in Italian) Francesco Valcanover, L'opera completa di Tiziano, Milan, Rizzoli, 1969 (Italian).
