= The Temples of Paestum =

1824 painting by Antonie Sminck Pitloo

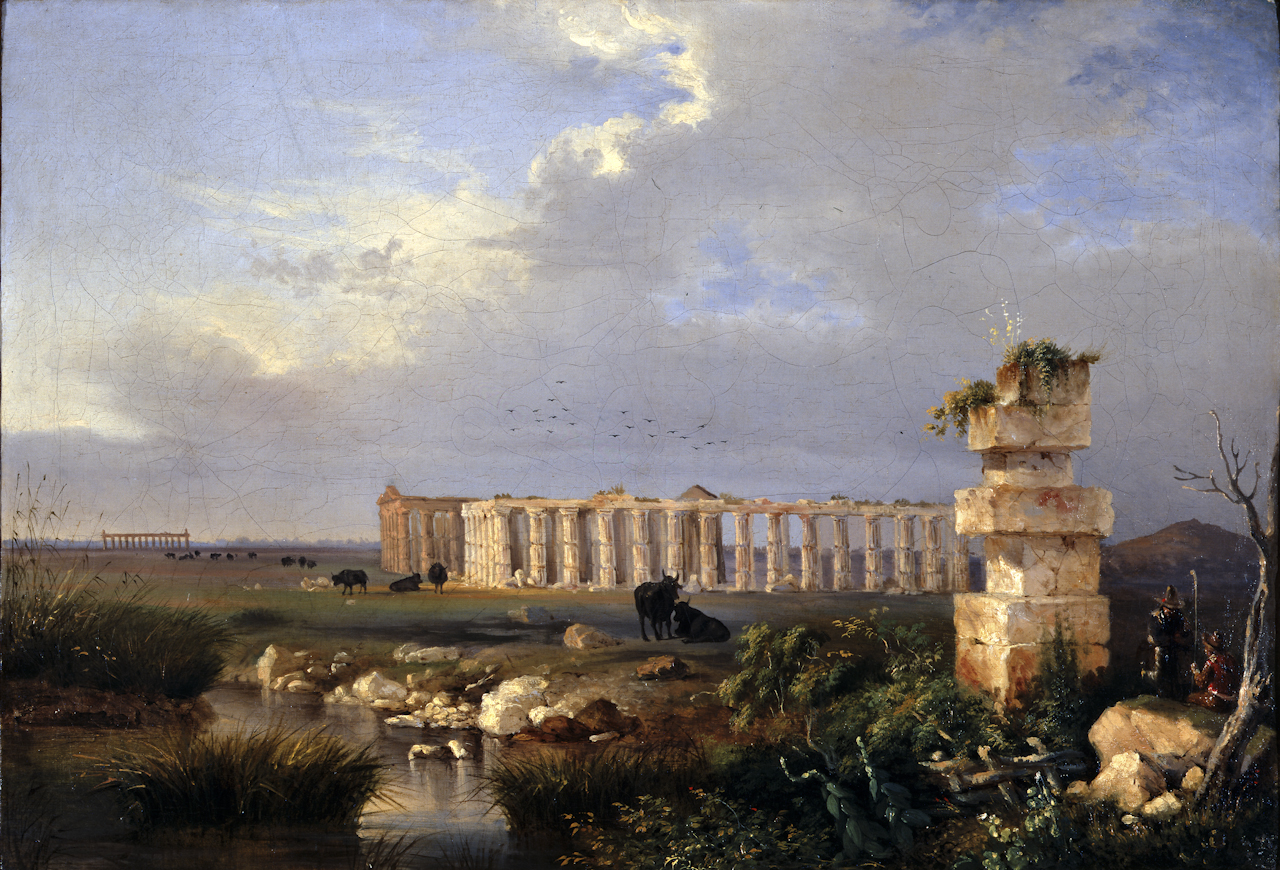
- Artist: Antonie Sminck Pitloo
- Year: 1824
- Medium: oil on canvas
- Dimensions: 60 cm × 86 cm (24 in × 34 in)
- Location: National Museum of Capodimonte, Naples

The Temples of Paestum is an 1824 painting by Antonie Sminck Pitloo. It shows two of the temples at Paestum, probably during an excavation.

It was produced the same year as its artist won the landscape category in the competition organised by the Real Istituto di Belle Arti di Napoli. It was first exhibited in 1826 at the Bourbon biennial and is now in Room 58 (part of the former Royal Apartments) of the National Museum of Capodimonte in Naples.
