= Jan Soens =

Dutch painter

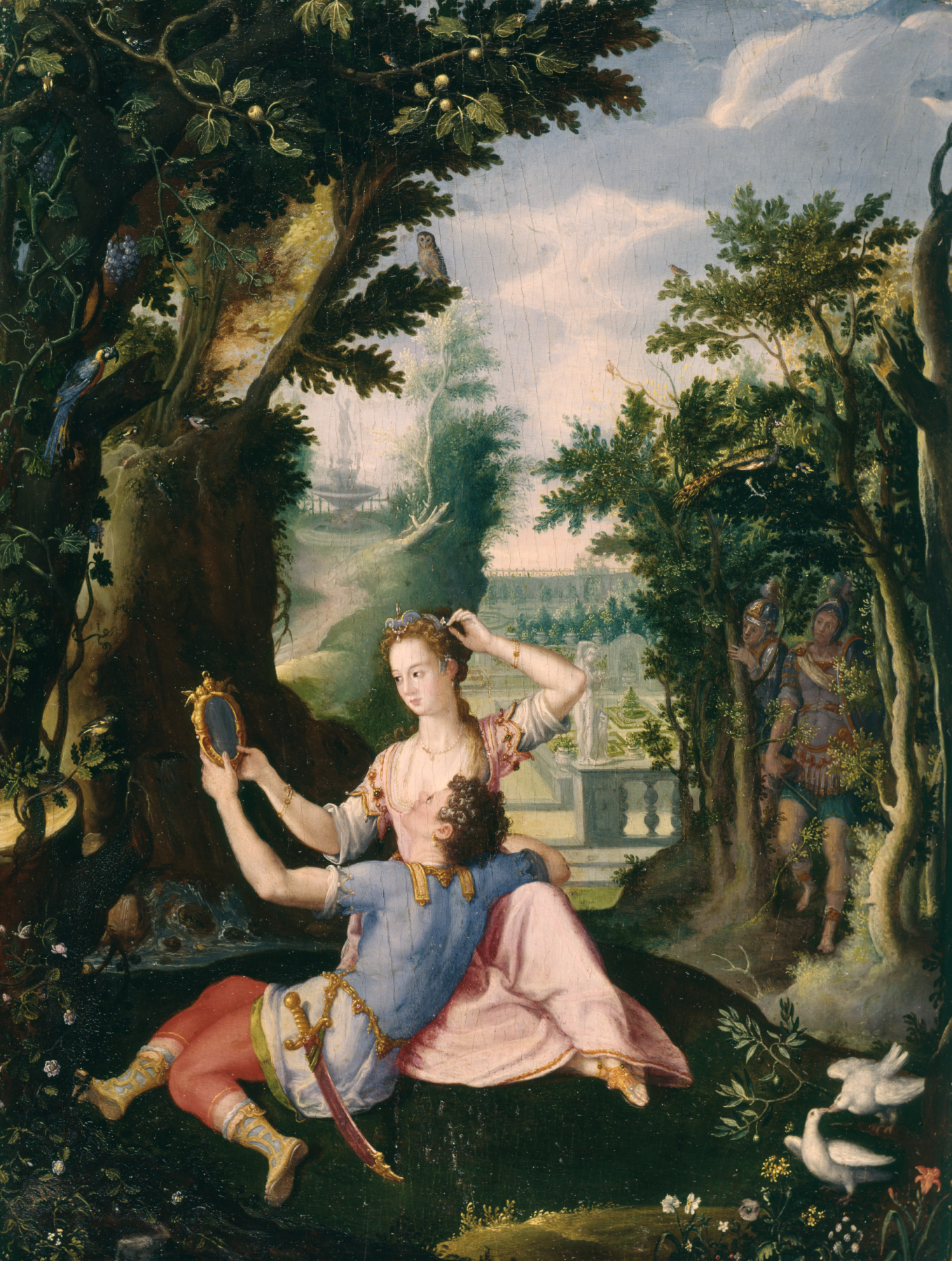
Rinaldo and Armida, from the play Jerusalem Delivered

Jan Soens (Dutch pronunciation: [jɑn ˈsuns]; c. 1547 – c. 1611), also known as Giovanni Sons, was a Dutch painter from 's-Hertogenbosch who mainly worked in Italy.

== Biography ==
According to Karel van Mander he moved to Antwerp to live with a schoolmaster named Jacob Boon, whereupon he taught himself the rudiments of painting. After becoming proficient, he moved in with the painter Gillis Mostaert, and assisted him creating landscape paintings in the manner of Gillis' twin brother Frans Mostaert. A few of these early landscapes could be seen in Amsterdam at the home of Hendrick Louwersz Spieghel at the time Karel van Mander was writing in 1604. Soens and he had met during Karel van Mander's trip to Italy, where Soens made small pieces on copper for the Pope in Rome.

According to the RKD he was in Rome from 1573 and in Parma from 1575. He was particularly active from 1575 with the Farnese in Rome, and in Piacenza and Parma in the early seventeenth century. He painted history works, such as the mannerist Jupiter and Antiope, as well as religious paintings reflecting the Council of Trent's decrees on art and Counter Reformation ideals of clearly represented piety. He died in Parma between 1611 and 1614.

== Bibliography ==
- Béguin, Sylvie. "An Unpublished Drawing by Jan Soens at Windsor Castle." Master Drawings, vol. 28, no. 3. (Autumn, 1990), pp. 275–279.
- Museo di Capodimonte, Jan Sons, Jupiter and Antiope (Italian)
- Jan Soens on Artnet
