= Madonna of Constantinople (Preti) =

Painting by Mattia Preti

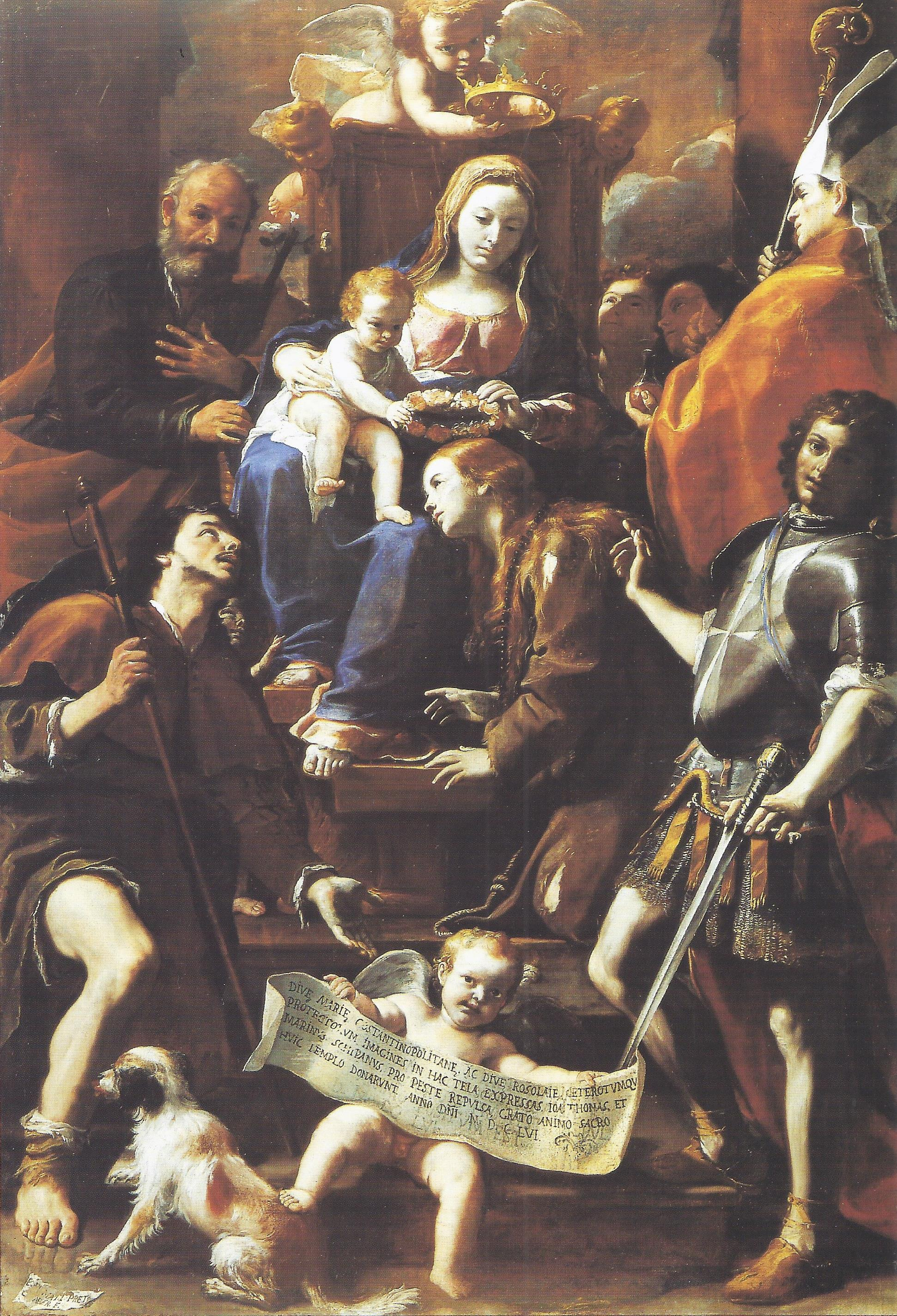
Madonna of Constantinople (c. 1656) by Mattia Preti

Madonna of Constantinople is a c. 1656 oil on canvas painting by Mattia Preti. It was the first of many works commissioned as ex-votos for freeing Naples from the plague of 1656 – they all showed the Madonna with a selection of the city's patron saints, in this case Joseph (left background), Januarius (right background), Roch (bottom left), Nicasius (bottom right) and Rosalia (centre). It now hangs in the Museo nazionale di Capodimonte in Naples.

== Bibliography ==
- (in Italian) Nicola Spinosa, Mattia Preti. Tra Roma, Napoli e Malta, 1ª ed., Napoli, Electa Napoli, 1999, ISBN 88-435-8799-4
- (in Italian) Nicola Spinosa, 'Da Mattia Preti a Luca Giordano - natura in posa', in Pittura del Seicento a Napoli, Napoli, Arte'm, 2011
