= Philip II in Armour =

Painting by Titian

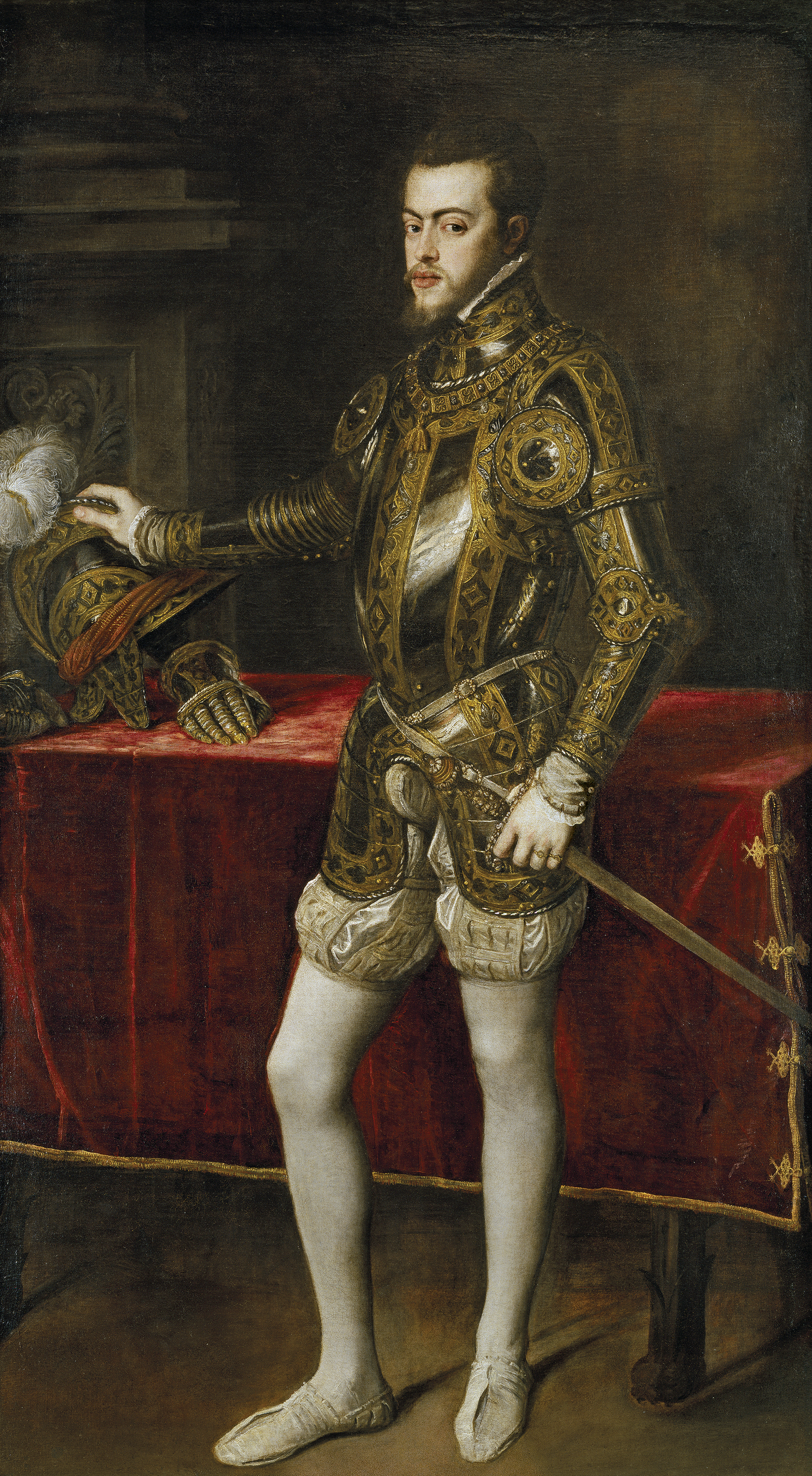
- Artist: Titian
- Year: c. 1551
- Medium: oil on canvas
- Dimensions: 193 cm × 111 cm (76 in × 44 in)
- Location: Museo del Prado; Madrid

Philip II in Armour is a portrait of Philip II of Spain by Titian, painted in 1551 when they were both in Augsburg. It is held at the Museo del Prado, in Madrid.

== History and description ==
The painting presents plenty of symbols of royal majesty, such as the column, the table covered with a velvet mantle and, above all, the superb armour of Prince Philip, the future king of Spain. Just as he had done a couple of years before with the portrait of his father, Equestrian Portrait of Charles V (1548), Titian succeeded in stylising the figure of the prince.

In May 1551, Philip sent a replica or second copy of the portrait to his aunt Mary of Hungary, which is no longer extant. According to a letter from Philip himself, he was not entirely satisfied with the portrait: while he liked the image of majesty projected, he was not fully convinced by the depiction of his face, considering that it had been painted too quickly. This shows that Philip was not yet familiar with the Venetian style of painting practised by Titian. However, the original in the Prado is now considered to be of the highest quality and to have a remarkable degree of resolution in the armour, that the prince's objections would rather refer to the replica painted for his aunt, surely with a more hurried brushstroke than the original currently known.

Since 1600, the portrait appears in the inventories made in the Royal Alcázar of Madrid, where it was copied by Peter Paul Rubens, in 1628. It was moved to the Prado, in 1827.

An old copy of this portrait is preserved in the palace of La Quinta (Cudillero), in Asturias; some sources attribute it to Rubens, since it is known that the Flemish painter copied several paintings by Titian from the Spanish royal collections.
