= Saint Joseph and a Devotee =

1529 painting by Correggio

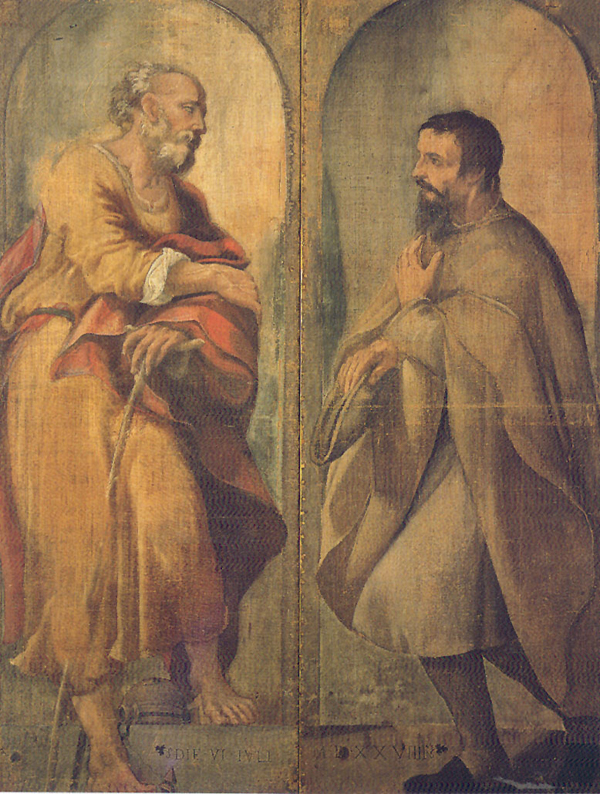

Saint Joseph and a Devotee is a 1529 tempera on canvas painting on two panels by Correggio, an attribution first proven in the modern era by Ferdinando Bologna in 1957. The panels are mentioned in the 1680 inventories of the Palazzo del Giardino in Parma as a work by Correggio. It is also recorded as such in Giacomo Barri's Viaggio pittoresco, published in 1671. Until the end of the 18th century it featured in Farnese inventories as a work by Corregio. It was probably moved to Naples with the rest of the Farnese collection in 1734 and is now in the National Museum of Capodimonte there.
