= Rinaldo and Armida (Annibale Carracci) =

Painting by Carracci

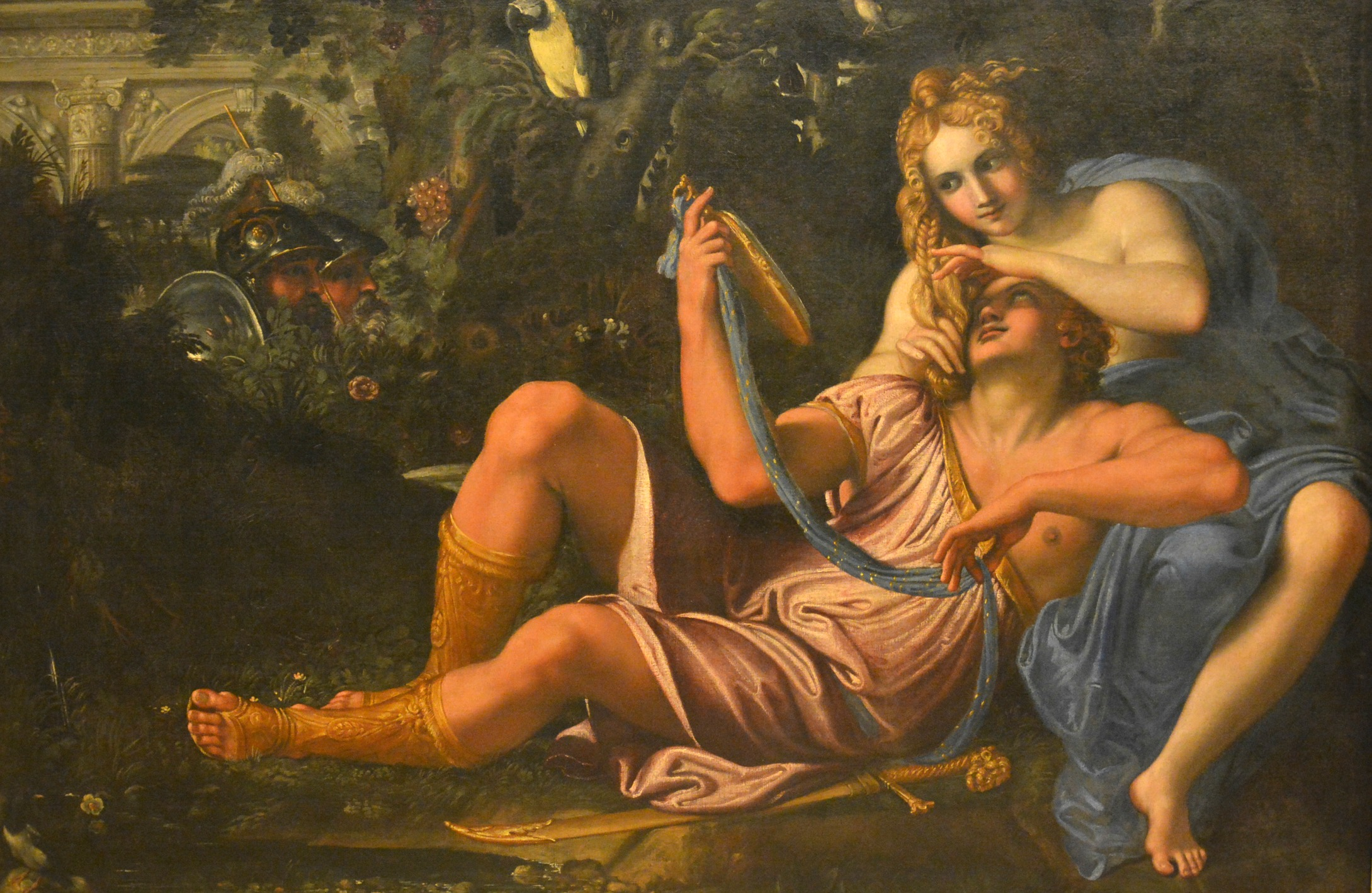
Rinaldo and Armida (c. 1601) by Annibale Carracci

Rinaldo and Armida is a c.1601 oil on canvas painting by the Italian Baroque painter Annibale Carracci, now in the National Museum of Capodimonte. Produced for Odoardo Farnese, it shows an episode from canto XVI of Tasso's Gerusalemme liberata featuring Rinaldo and Armida.
