= Jacob de Backer =

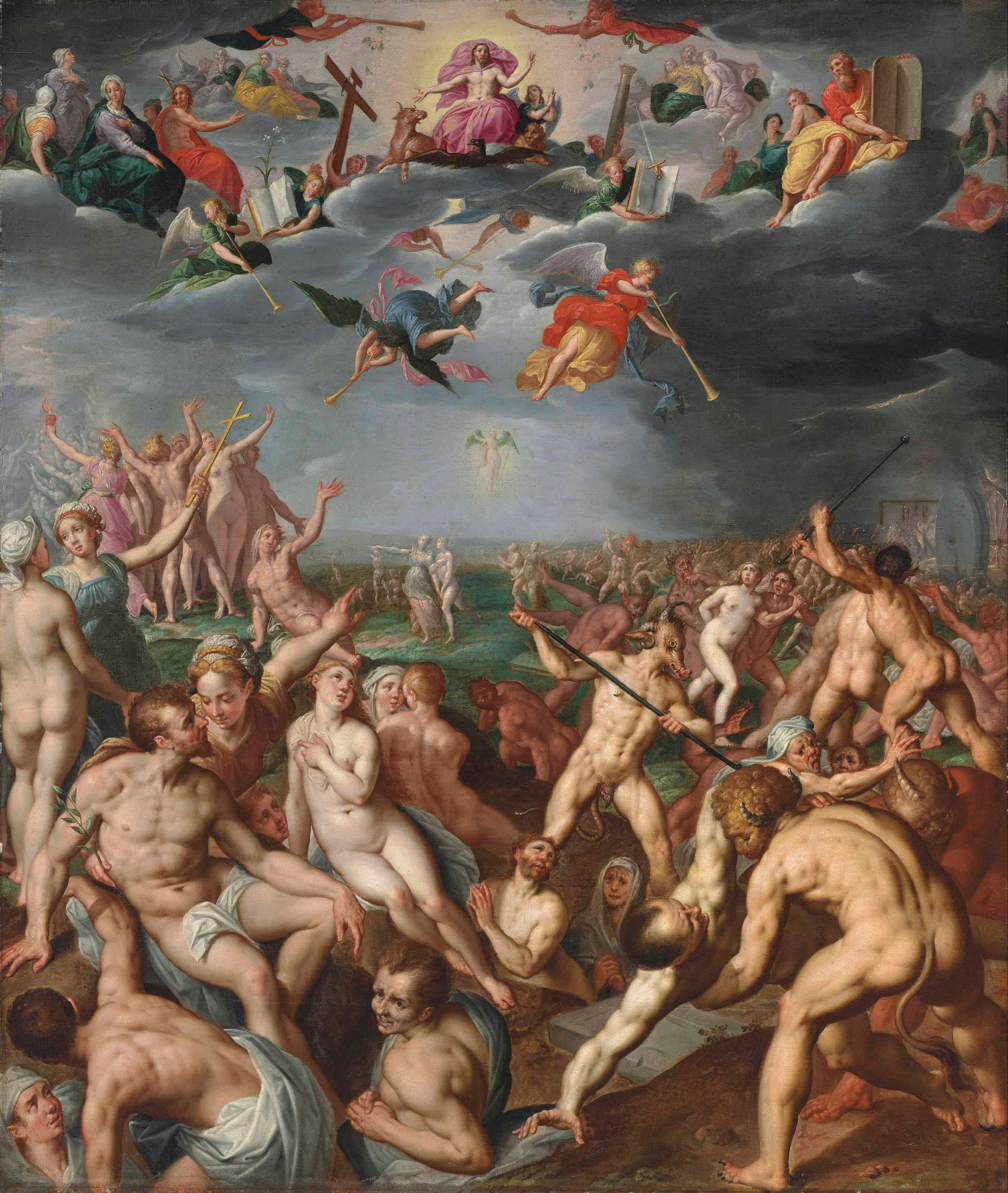
Last Judgment, c. 1583

Jacob de Backer (c. 1555 – c. 1591) was a Flemish Mannerist painter and draughtsman active in Antwerp between about 1571 and 1585. Even though he died young at the age of 30, the artist was very prolific and an extensive body of work has been attributed to him. Art historians are not agreed on how many of these works are autograph or the product of a workshop. The works attributed to the artist or his workshop are executed in a late-Mannerist style clearly influenced by Italian models.

== Life ==
Very little is known about this artist. The dates of his death and birth are unknown. Scholars do not agree on his life span nor the definitive scope of his oeuvre. It is believed that he was born in Antwerp and died there c. 1591–1600.

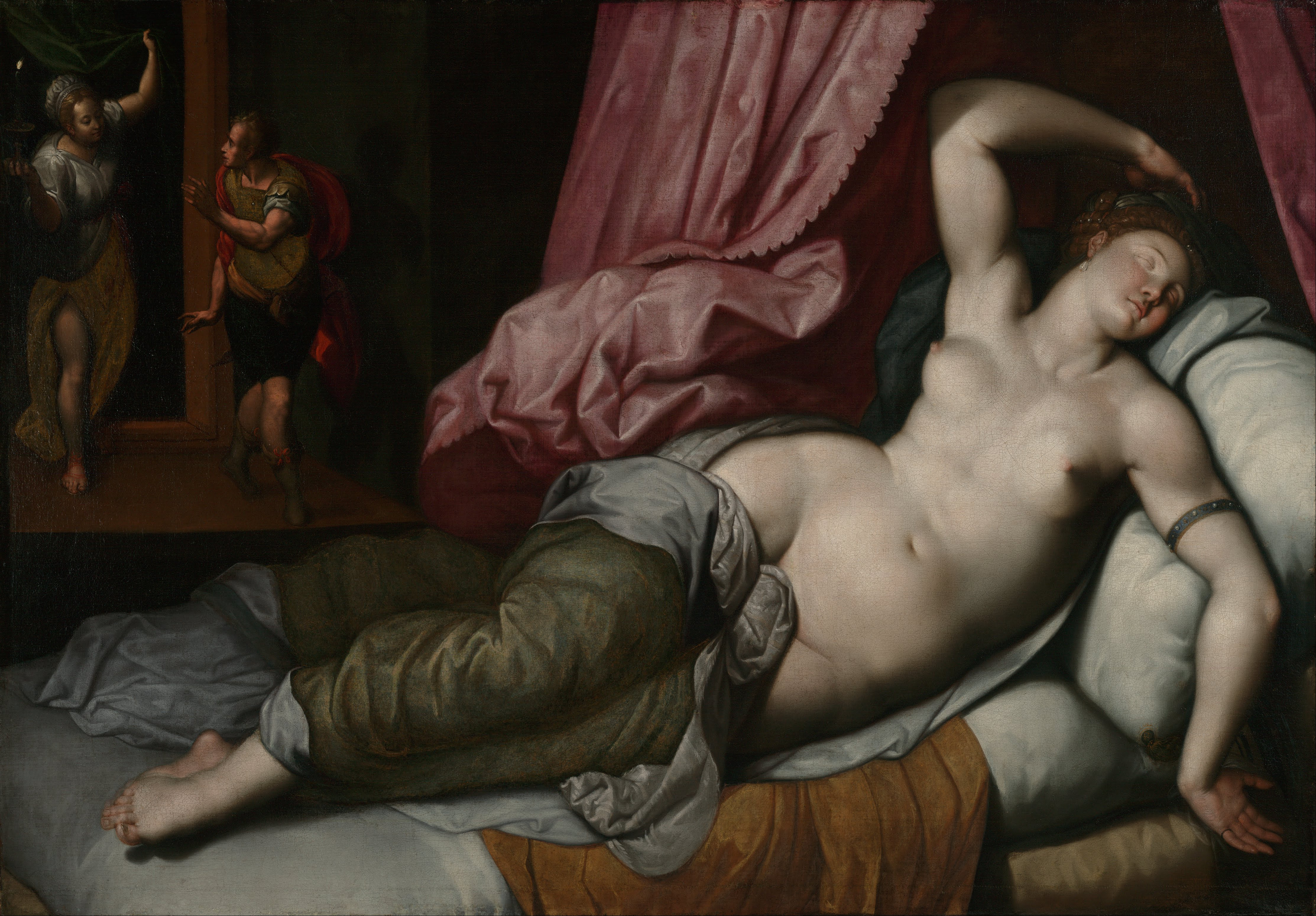
Paris Being Admitted to the Bedchamber of Helen

The early Flemish biographer Karel van Mander reported in his Schilder-boeck (1604) that de Backer was abandoned as a young boy by his father, also a painter, who had to flee Antwerp because of an impending court trial. He then worked for a number of years in the studio of a painter and picture dealer of Italian origin but Protestant confession known as Antonio van Palermo (1503/13–before 1589). He later entered the workshop of Hendrick van Steenwijck the Elder (1550–1603). Van Mander claimed that Palermo worked him so hard that the young de Backer died in the arms of his master's daughter at the age of thirty. As van Mander indicated that that had happened a long time ago it must have been before van Steenwijck left Antwerp in 1586. So this places the time of death of de Backer prior to 1586.

Little is known about the artist's training. There is no record of him ever becoming a master in the Antwerp Guild of St. Luke. While his work shows a strong influence of the Mannerism of Rome and Florence, in particular the high Mannerist style of Giorgio Vasari, there is no evidence that de Backer made a study trip to Italy as did many of his contemporary Flemish artists.

Many of his compositions deal with complex allegorical subjects. This has been interpreted as evidence that the artist enjoyed a humanistic education and his patrons were from Antwerp's educated class.

== Work ==
Although the artist lived only for about 30 years, a great number of works have been attributed to him or his workshop. He remains a problematic figure in the history of late 16th-century Netherlandish art. None of his pictures mentioned by Karel van Mander in the Schilder-Boeck have been securely identified and no painting or drawing attributed to him carries a signature that can be authenticated.

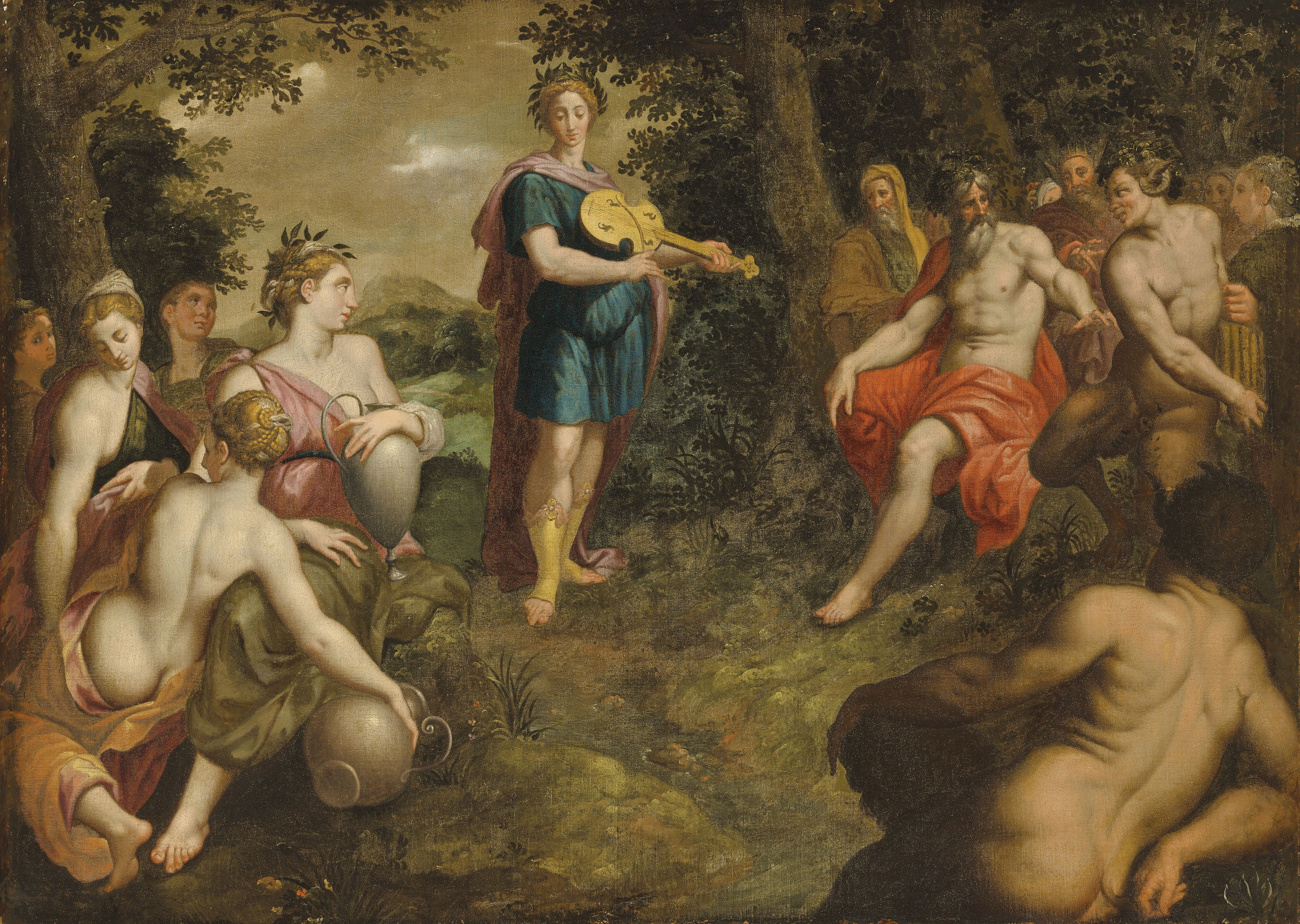
The Contest of Apollo and Pan

Only three known pictures can be traced back by means of provenance to the days of de Backer and serve as the basis for the attribution of "other, undocumented paintings". Two of these works are variant versions of the Last Judgment – one painted for the funerary monument of fellow Antwerp painter Pieter Goetkind I (d. 1583) and the other for the funerary monument of famous Antwerp printer and publisher Christophe Plantin (d. 1589). The version currently in the Antwerp Cathedral (c. 1589) was from the Plantin monument. It is now believed that the side wings to this picture were the work of another artist. The version made for the Goetkind monument is possibly the Last Judgement (c. 1583) auctioned by Christie's on 28 January 2015 in New York as lot 107. These two variant interpretations of the subject of the Last Judgement are believed to be the originals after which the many known copies were made. A series of the "Seven Deadly Sins" was bought in Antwerp by Alessandro Farnese's secretary Cosimo Masi in 1594 and taken to Italy. These paintings are now in the Museo di Capodimonte in Naples.

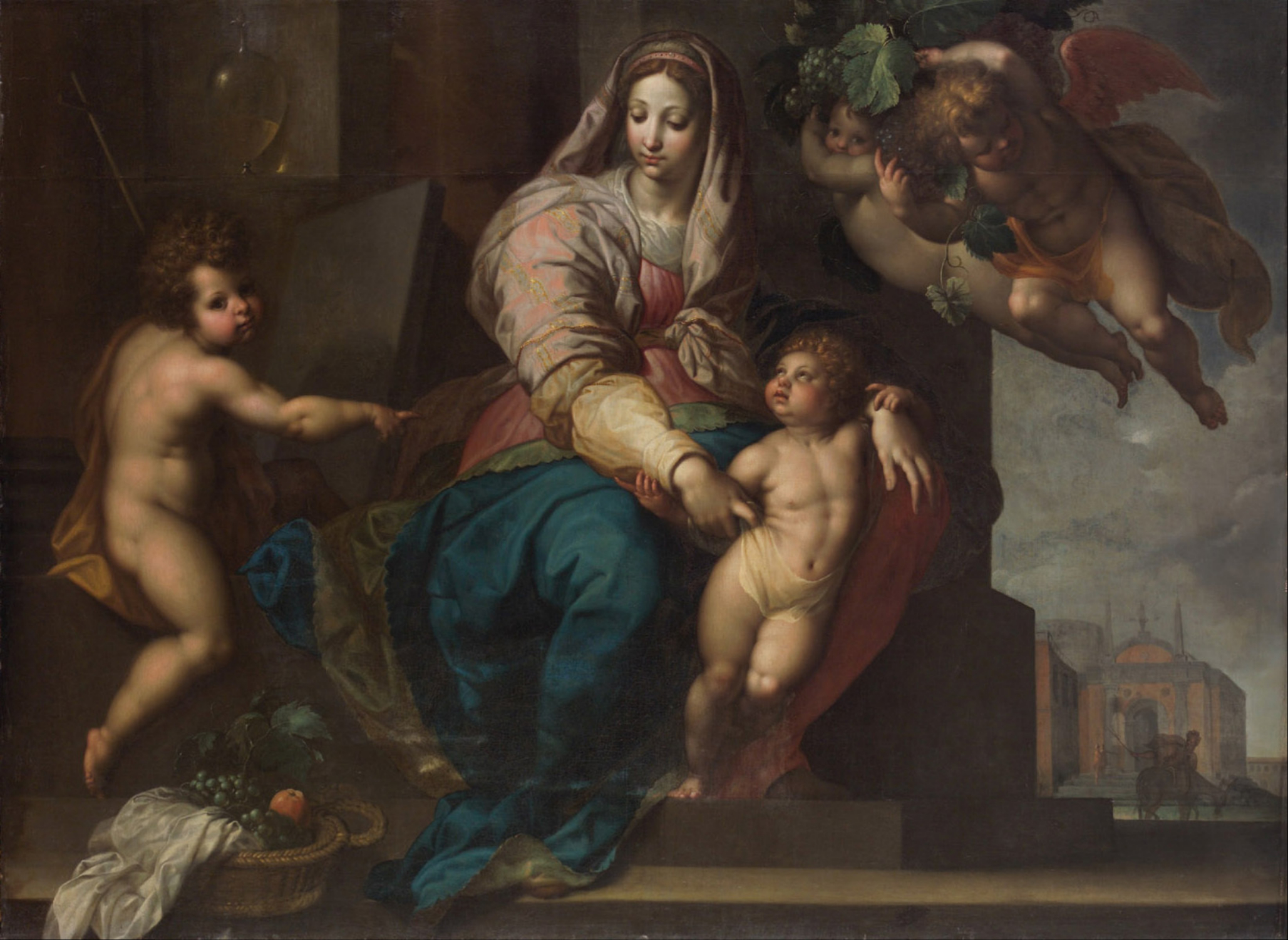
Madonna and Child with Saint John

The difficulty of a clear provenance and definition of the artist's style has not stopped the art trade from attributing a large number of paintings and drawings to de Backer. This includes works treating allegorical, mythological, and religious subjects. These are attributed based on the knowledge that they were produced in the Southern Netherlands between about 1570 and 1600 and display a strong influence of late Italian Manierism. The works attributed on these grounds to Jacob de Backer exhibit wide differences in artistic quality and represent a plurality of individual sub-styles. Many of the works attributed to him also appear in multiple versions. Some scholars have suggested that it would be preferable to treat Jacob de Backer more as the head of a workshop rather than as a master. In fact, de Backer was never mentioned as a master in the Antwerp Guild.

The art historian Eckhard Leuschner has suggested that it would be better to stop attempting to isolate original pictures created by a distinct personality called Jacob de Backer and rather to concentrate on defining a corpus of works closely related in style and iconography to be labelled "the de Backer group." Only after that group has been identified and studied systematically should an attempt be made to distinguish individual hands in the various works in that group. In respect of the various versions of a single composition Leuschner has further proposed to study how the choice for a particular artistic means was connected with contemporary workshop practice and the artistic preference of patrons and art collectors of that time.
