= Herri met de Bles =

Flemish landscape painter

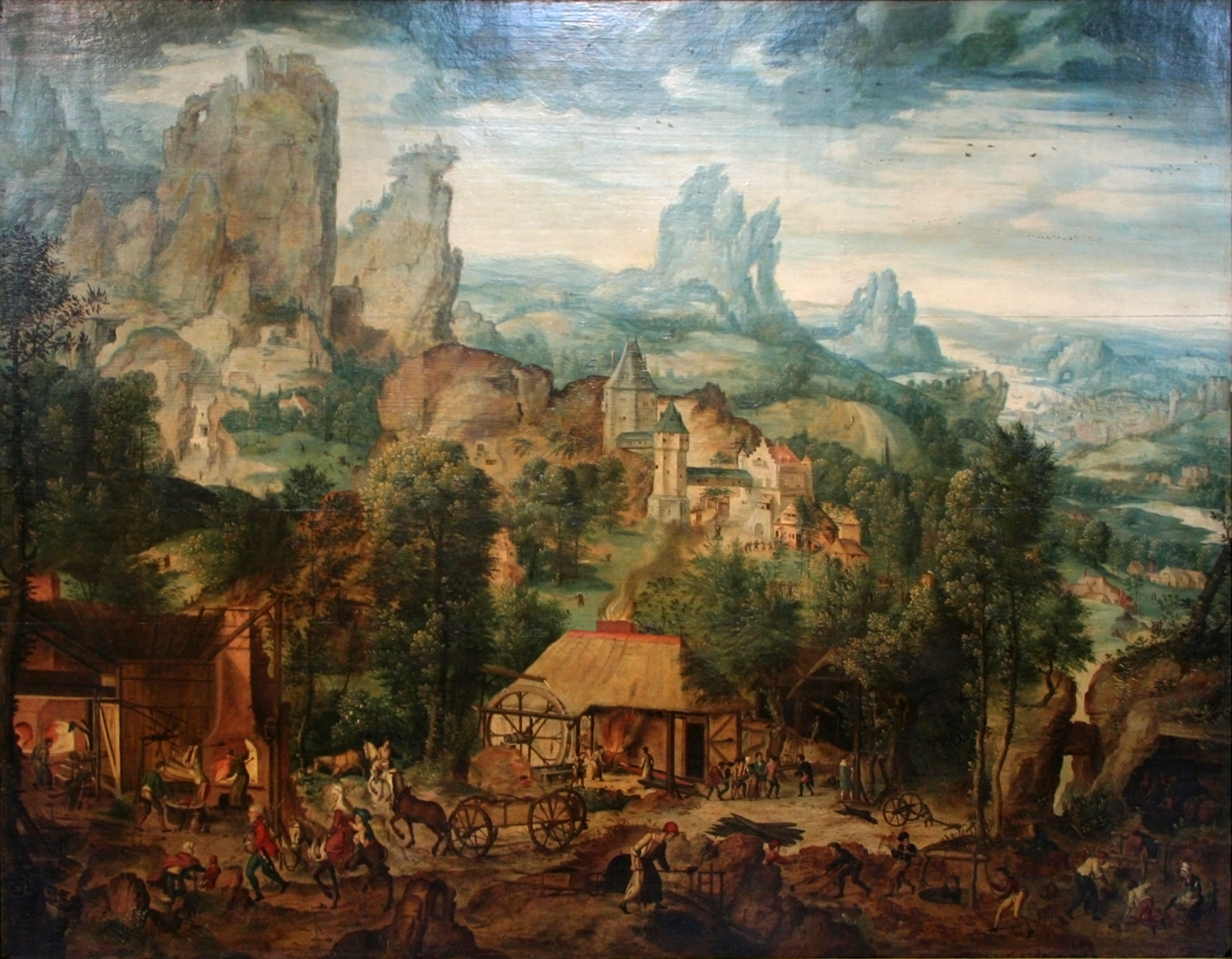
Landscape with a Foundry, oil on panel (between 1525 and 1550), National Gallery Prague

Herri met de Bles, also known as Henri Bles, Herri de Dinant, and Herry de Patinir (c. 1510 – c. 1566 (Note: A more confident date for his death is between 1550 and 1567.)), was a Flemish Northern Renaissance and Mannerist landscape painter. He was a native of Bouvignes or Dinant (both in Wallonia, in present-day Belgium).

He contributed, along with Joachim Patinir and Lucas Gassel, to a distinct style of Northern Renaissance landscape painting basically originating from Gerard David's works and combining small history or religious scenes into compositions defined by perspective and atmospheric effects. They all painted landscapes seen from a high viewpoint and rocky masses. They did not aim to create a realistic depiction but an atmospheric effect. Herri met de Bles always included a few small figures involved in a religious episode or everyday activities such as mining, agriculture or trade.

== Life ==
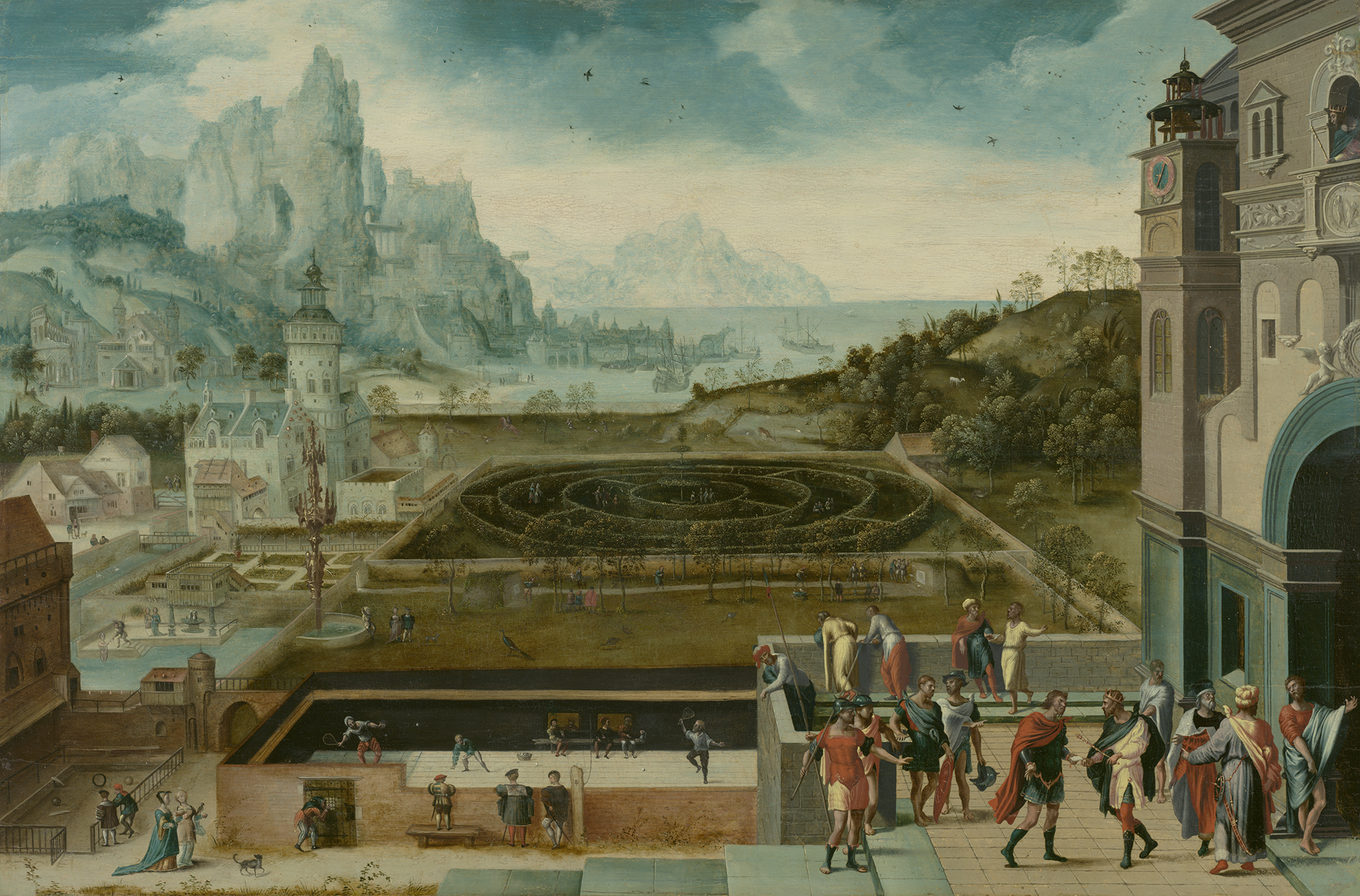
The Story of David and Bathsheba

Very little biographical information is known about Bles. He was likely born near Dinant around 1510, though some older sources put his birth at various dates between 1480 and 1500. He is believed to be identical to a certain Herry de Patenir who joined Antwerp's Guild of St. Luke in 1533 as a painter. Some speculate he was a nephew of the landscape painter Joachim Patinir, but there is not any kind of historical evidence to support this claim and he may not have trained under him because of their age difference.

He probably visited Ferrara, Italy as an Italian source mentions it. His work was popular in Italy, where he was known as 'il Civetta' because of the little owl that often appears in his paintings, usually in a hollow tree or in a cavity between some rocks. The 17th-century biographer Karel van Mander regarded this motif as his signature. The name Herri met de Bles translates literally from Dutch as Herri with the blaze and was reportedly given him because of his characteristic white forelock. He may have been the pupil of Lucas Gassel, who was at least 10 years his senior. There are significant similarities between their works about the subject of David and Bathsheba. Besides, they are depicted together (along with Hans Holbein) in a 1764 coloured engraving by Jan l'Admiral with Gassel being in the foreground and Bles shown in the more obscure lower right corner. The notname of "Pseudo Bles" was invented to cover a number of Antwerp Mannerist paintings that had previously been attributed to Bles, after it was recognised that this was wrong. In 1915 by Max Jakob Friedländer in "Die Antwerpener Manieristen von 1520" made a first attempt to put order in the growing number of works from the Netherlands that were catalogued under the "name of embarrassment" "pseudo-Herri met de Bles" (usually now "Pseudo Bles").

The Dutch art institute and research center RKD describes him as still active in Antwerp in 1566. Other sources note his death as after 1550, before 1567, or before 1572.

== Work ==
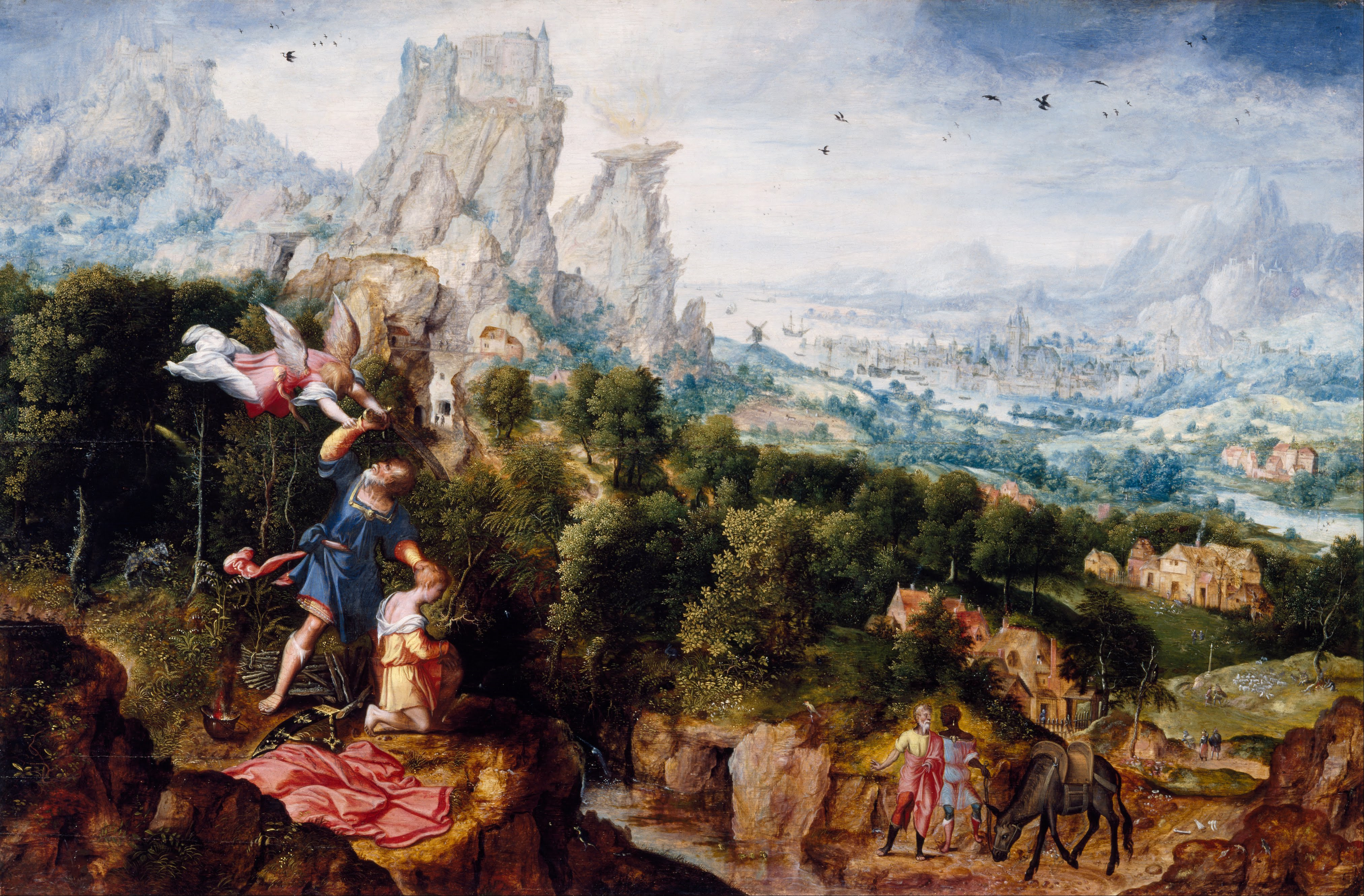
Landscape with the Offering of Isaac

His landscapes are different from Patinir's in that Bles' work shows more foreground landscapes, a looser composition and greater detail. His choice of colours is generally less rich than that of Patinir. Along with a group of Antwerp-based followers of Hieronymus Bosch that included Jan Mandyn, Pieter Huys, and Jan Wellens de Cock, Bles brought the tradition of fantastic imagery into northern Mannerism.

Most of his sketches are in German public collections in Berlin and Hamburg, one of them is in the Louvre, Paris. Most of his paintings are exhibited in Belgian museums (Namur, Antwerp etc.), with some in the Museo di Capodimonte, Naples, and the Kunsthistorisches Museum in Vienna.

Bles ran a productive studio and was popular in his own time. Because of this and that signing works was uncommon at the time, it is difficult to distinguish Bles' own works from those of his studio.

== In popular culture ==
In Richard Powers's novel The Gold Bug Variations (1991), one of the main characters, Todd, is working on a dissertation whose subject is Herri met de Bles. The painter's obscurity and his peculiar imagery are woven into the motifs of the novel. In Olga Tokarczuk's novel Empuzjon (2022), one of the minor characters, the fine-arts student Thilo von Hahn, is likewise writing a PhD thesis on the artist.

== Sources ==
- Norman E. Muller (Ed.): Herri met de Bles: Studies and Explorations of the World Landscape Tradition. Brepols, Turnhout 1998, ISBN 0-943012-25-2
- Michel Weemans. "Herri met de Bles's Sleeping Peddler: An Exegetical and Anthropomorphic Landscape". Art Bulletin, 88, no. 3 (September 2006): pages 459-481.
- Weemans, Michel. "Herri Met de Bles's Way to Calvary: A Silenic Landscape," Art History 32, no. 2 (April 2009), 307–331.
