= Madonna of St. Jerome (Correggio) =

C.1528 painting by Antonio da Correggio

Madonna and Child with Sts Jerome and Mary Magdalen (The Day)
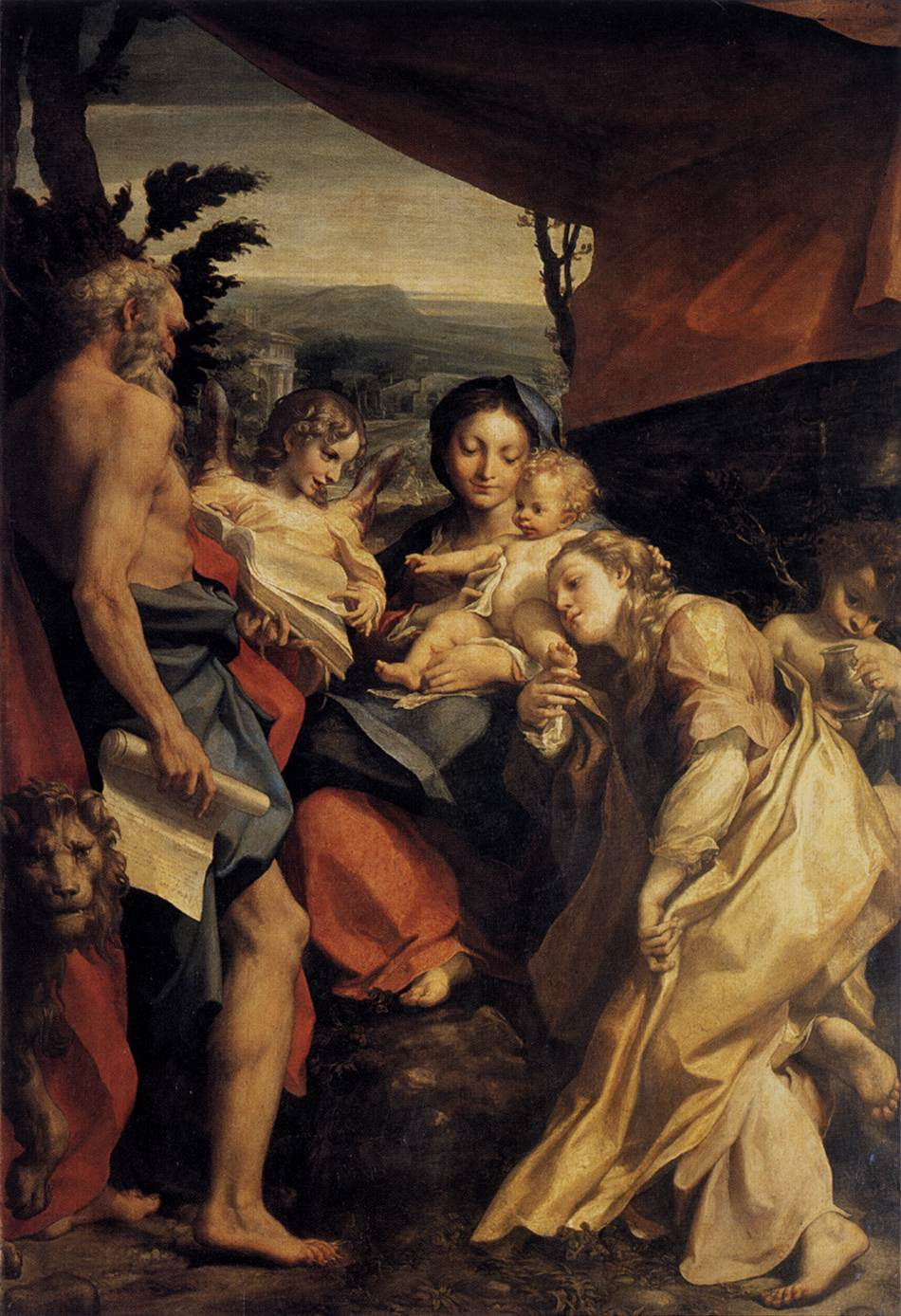
- Artist: Correggio
- Year: c. 1528
- Medium: Oil on canvas
- Dimensions: 235 cm × 141 cm (93 in × 56 in)
- Location: Galleria Nazionale, Parma

The Madonna and Child with Sts Jerome and Mary Magdalen (The Day) is an oil on canvas painting by the Italian Renaissance artist Correggio dating from around 1528 and housed in the Galleria Nazionale of Parma, Italy.

== History ==
The canvas was commissioned in 1523 by Briseide Colla for a private chapel on the right side of the church of Sant'Antonio Abate in Parma. Contemporary art historian and painter Giorgio Vasari described the work's il mirabile colorito ("wonderful color"), and it was also studied by El Greco.

In the early 18th century, the church needed costly restoration works and several collectors, including the Kings of Poland and France and the Holy Roman Emperor, offered to buy the work. However, in 1749 it was transferred into the Cathedral of Parma and later was bought by the Duchy of Parma. During the French occupation of northern Italy, it was stolen and brought to France. The painting was returned to Italy in 1815 and placed on display in the Parma gallery. A 1724 copy of the painting hangs in the chapel of Palais Rohan, Strasbourg.

Francesco Algarotti in his Dialogues suggested that it was perhaps the most beautiful painting in the world.

A copy by Bartolomeo Schedoni is kept by the Musée Bertrand in Châteauroux, France.

== Sources ==
- Adani, Giuseppe (2007). Correggio pittore universale. Correggio: Silvana Editoriale.
