= Portrait of Ferdinand I, Duke of Parma =

Painting by Johann Zoffany

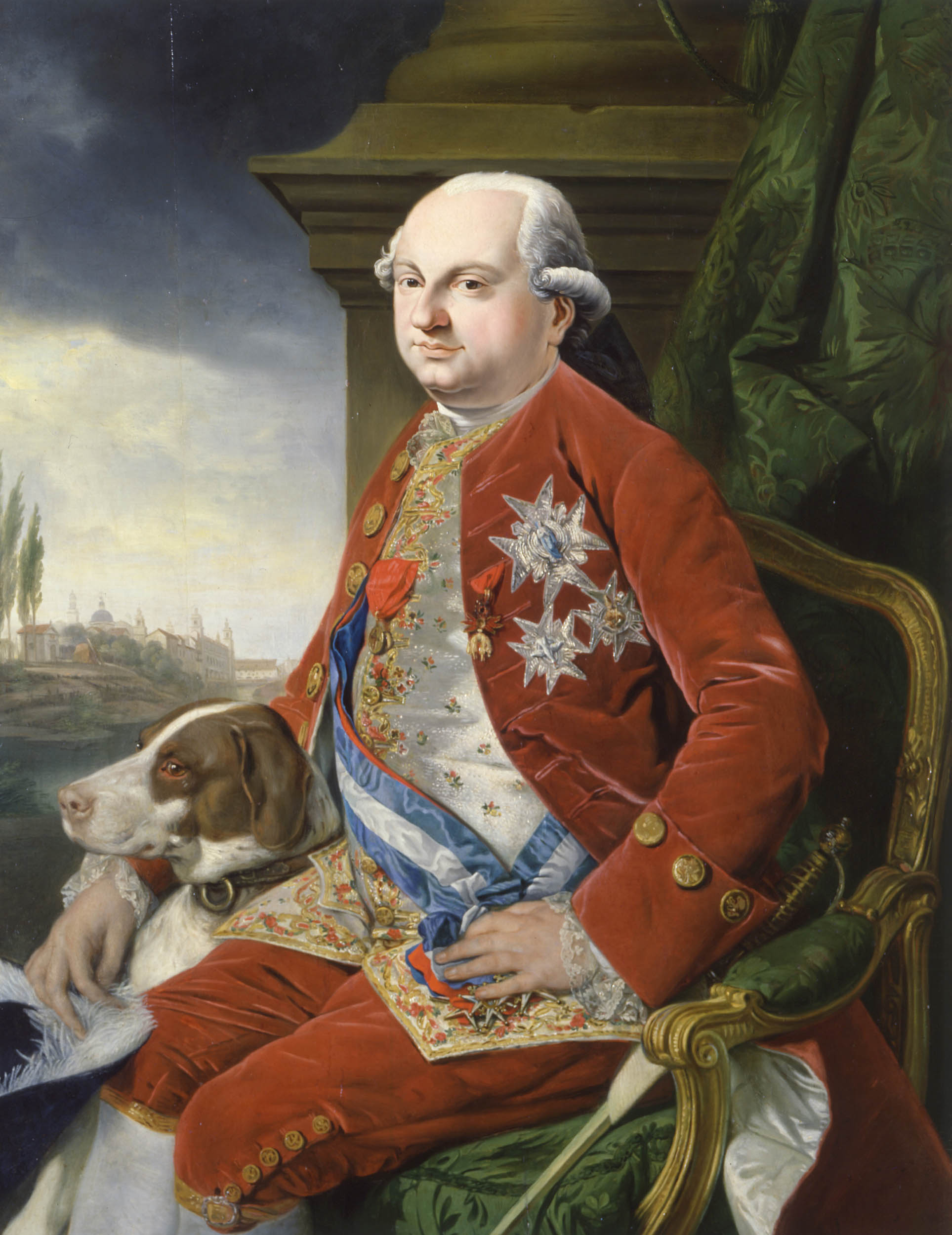
- Artist: Johann Zoffany
- Year: 1778–1779
- Medium: Oil on panel
- Dimensions: 107 cm × 86 cm (42 in × 34 in)
- Location: Galleria nazionale di Parma, Parma

The Portrait of Ferdinand I, Duke of Parma is an oil-on-panel painting by German artist Johann Zoffany, executed in 1778–1779. It is held at the Galleria nazionale di Parma. The painting was already part of the museum collection in 1791, exhibited in the Meeting Room of the Academy of Fine Arts of Parma.

== History ==
The portrait is related to the British tradition of courtly portraiture, which Zoffany, originally from Frankfurt, had approached after his move to England in 1760.

Zoffany came to Parma in the Spring of 1778 after a profitable stay in Florence in which he had come into contact, through rich English residents, with the court of the Habsburg-Lorraine. It was perhaps Maria Luisa, the Grand Duchess of Tuscany, who invited the painter to come to Parma, where lived her sister Maria Amalia, wife of Ferdinand, Duke of Parma. He would be commissioned to create two major commissions in Parma, including the current portrait.

== Description ==
Inserted in a splendid original frame, the painting depicts Ferdinand, Duke of Parma and Piacenza, from 1765 to 1802. He appears seated on an elegant Louis XV style armchair, depicted in three-quarter length, with a dog by the left side, and holding his hat with his right hand, against the backdrop of a landscape that allows to clearly see the Ducal Palace of Colorno, his favorite residence. Ferdinand wears an elegant official suit, with white stockings, knee-length trousers and a red velvet tailcoat adorned with his prestigious honors, such as the Order of the Golden Fleece, the Order of the Holy Spirit, the Order of the Immaculate Conception and the Order of San Gennaro. He also wears an elegant waistcoat in silver embroidered with floral motifs, notable for the refined rendering of the fabrics, where the cross of the Constantinian Order of St. George is pinned. Behind him are visible a huge column and a green curtain.
