= Saint John Fleeing Christ's Arrest =

C.1522 painting by Antonio da Correggio

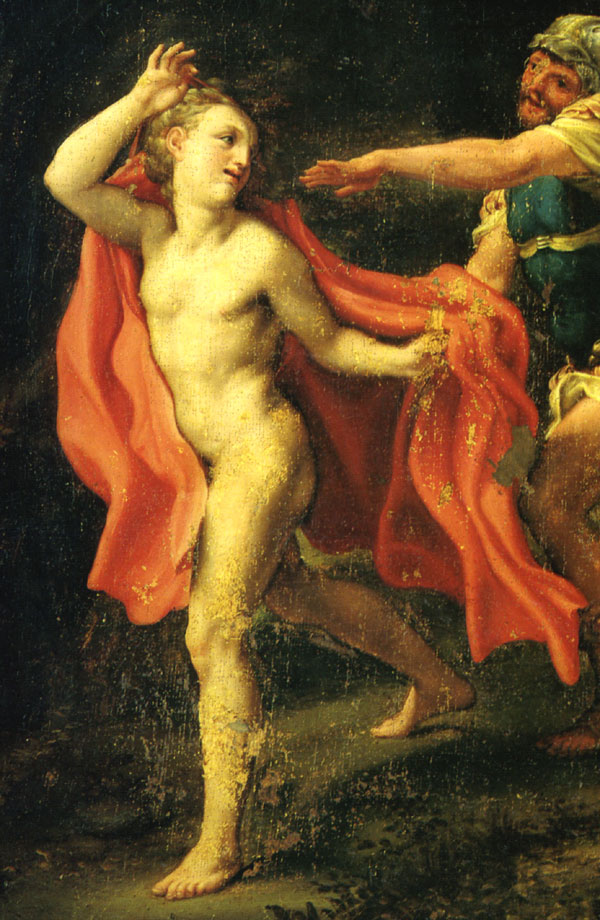
Saint John Fleeing Christ's Arrest (c. 1522), copy of an original by Correggio

Saint John Fleeing Christ's Arrest is a c. 1522 oil on canvas painting now in the Galleria nazionale di Parma. It is a copy (probably by an Emilian artist) of a lost original by Correggio.

== Bibliography ==
- (in Italian) Giuseppe Adani, Correggio pittore universale, Silvana Editoriale, Correggio 2007. ISBN 9788836609772
