= Madonna della Scodella =

16th-century panel painting by Correggio

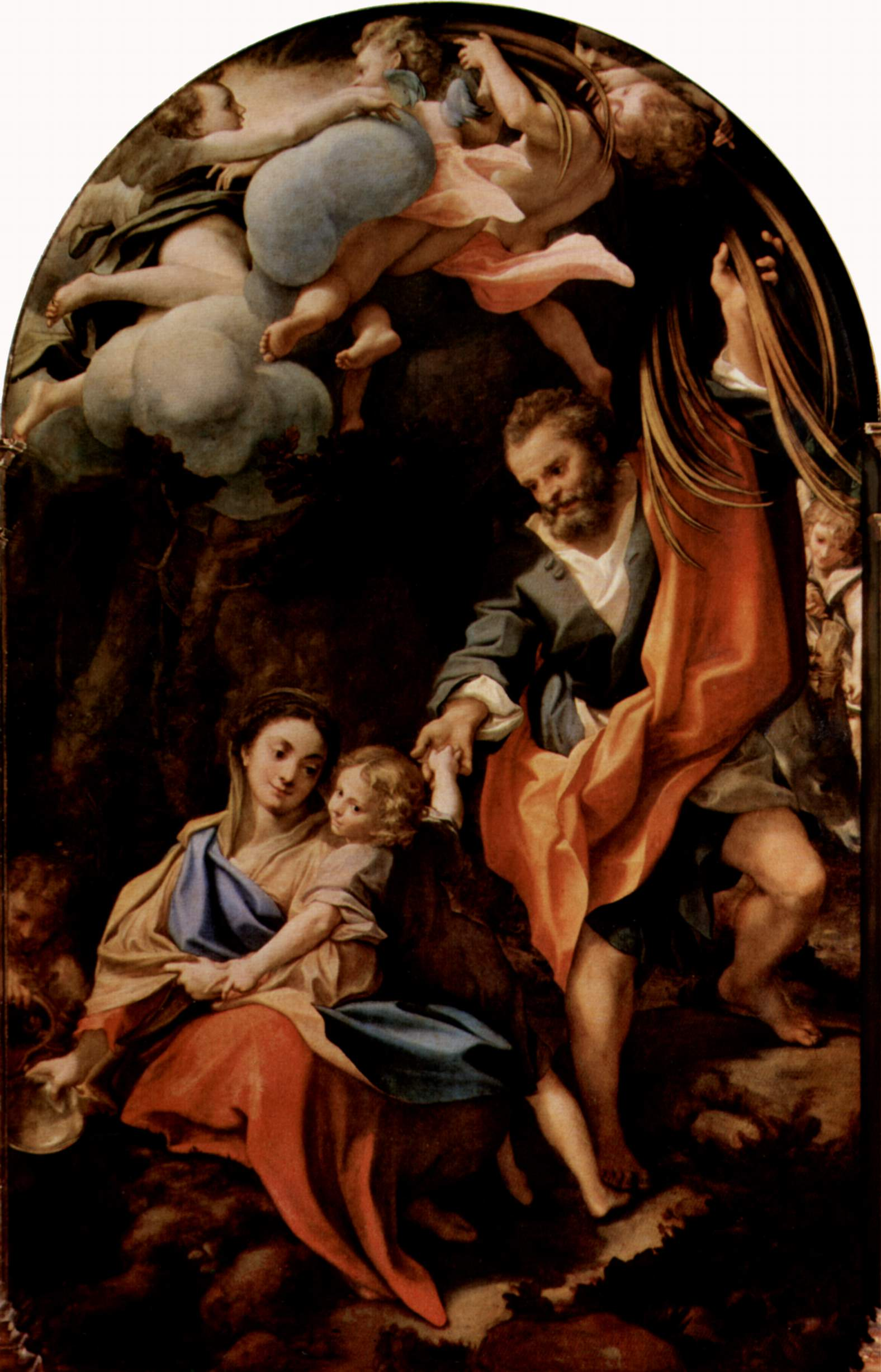
- Artist: Antonio da Correggio
- Year: c. 1528–1530
- Medium: Oil on wood
- Dimensions: 216.7 cm × 137.3 cm (85.3 in × 54.1 in)
- Location: Galleria nazionale di Parma

Madonna della Scodella is an oil painting on panel by Antonio da Correggio (216,7 x 137,3 cm), dated from c. 1528–1530 and preserved at the Galleria nazionale di Parma.

== History ==
The panel painting was made by Correggio for the San Sepolcro, Parma. It was probably commissioned in 1524, when Cristoforo Bondini, dying, left in his will 15 lire for the creation of a painting for the altar of Saint Joseph. There are two known preparatory drawings for the painting. The result was completed in 1530, as is revealed in the inscription on the original frame:

DIVO IOSEPPO DEIPARAE VIRGINIS CUSTODI / FIDISS COELITUSQ DESTINATO HVIVSCE / ARAE COMUNI AERE ERECTORES DEVOTI / ALACRESQ EREXERE / DIE II IVNII

Giorgio Vasari cited the work as "panel of divine painting" in the second edition of his Lives while speaking of Girolamo da Carpi, who he believed had studied in San Sepolcro. The painting remained there until 1796, when it was requisitioned by the Napoleonic government and taken to Paris. It was repatriated in 1815, after the defeat of Napoleon at Waterloo, and was placed in the following year in the Ducal Gallery. In 1893, at the proposal of art critic Corrado Ricci, it was reinserted into its original frame.

For dating the painting, the commonly agreed range is 1528–1530. Art historian Cecil Gould believed that the angels at the highest part of the canvas were made in those years and that the lower part of the work was made, however, around 1535.

Madonna della Scodella has had a wide influence: it was studied by, among others, Lelio Orsi, Federico Barocci, Lanfranco Frigeri, Domenichino, as well as Carlo Maratta and Pompeo Batoni. A 1724 copy of the painting hangs in the chapel of Palais Rohan, Strasbourg.

== Description and style ==
The painting depicts an episode in the infancy of Jesus narrated in the apocryphal Gospel of Pseudo-Matthew: while returning to Palestine after the Flight into Egypt and during a break in the shade of a date palm, the Sacred Family were fed, thanks to the tree, which, folding extraordinarily, offered its fruits to the travelers.

The Virgin is represented in the act of collecting the fruits, with a bowl of water miraculously appearing to quench Jesus' thirst. From this, the traditional name of the work is derived. The title with which it is known also signified the importance that Correggio wished to place, as with his Madonna of the Basket, on the simple object of the bowl.

This iconography was not often used in Italian artistic production. It was, however, more frequent in the North, as displayed by the works of Albrecht Altdorfer and Lucas Cranach.

The protagonist role of Joseph was a response to the needs of the Fraternity that commissioned the painting. The image is constructed on a diagonal line, that opens on the left with the bowl of silver and follows the intertwining of hands by the Virgin, Baby Jesus, and Joseph. The pose of Jesus, in a calculated contrapposto, allows him to act as a link between the represented scene and the real world of the observer, to whom he turns a knowing gaze.

On high, a glory of angels frees itself in an animated spiral that recalls the Correggio's frescoes of his Assumption of the Virgin in the Parma duomo.
