= Madonna and Child with Saints (Agostino Carracci) =

Painting by Agostino Carracci

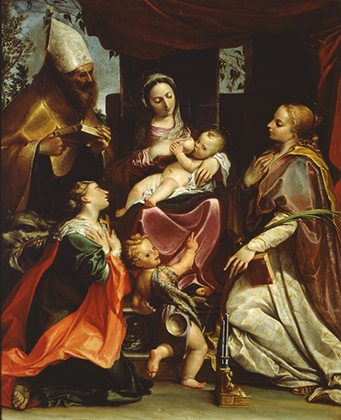
- Artist: Agostino Carracci
- Year: 1586
- Medium: oil on canvas
- Dimensions: 152 cm × 127 cm (60 in × 50 in)
- Location: Galleria nazionale di Parma, Parma

Madonna and Child with Saints is an oil painting on canvas by the Italian painter Agostino Carracci, from 1585, dated on the lowest step of the Virgin Mary's throne. An example of a sacra conversazione. Long in the Benedictine abbey of San Paolo in Parma, French troops took it to Paris in 1796 and on its return to Italy in 1816 it was moved to the Galleria nazionale di Parma, where it still hangs.

== Description ==
From left to right the four accompanying saints are an unidentified bishop or abbot (some argue for Benedict of Nursia, whilst Quintavalle identified him as Nicholas of Bari), Margaret of Antioch (with a cross and a dragon), the infant Saint John the Baptist and Cecilia (with her palm of martyrdom, a book and a small organ). The figure kneeling to the Madonna's right was traditionally a painting's commissioner or his or her name-saint. Here that figure is Saint Margaret, showing it was commissioned for the abbey church by Margherita Farnese (she was then its abbess, having joined the Benedictines after Vincenzo Gonzaga had their marriage annulled). She also studied music there with Giulio Cima, so assiduously that she was accused of an affair with him, rumours which the figure of Saint Cecilia in the painting may have been intended to dispel.

The work's colour scheme, luminosity and silks show the influence of contemporary Venetian art, reinterpreted through the naturalistic Parmese lens of painters such as Correggio, with Cecilia's pose also influenced by Parmigianino.
