= The Funeral of the Virgin Mary =

Painting by Agostino Carracci

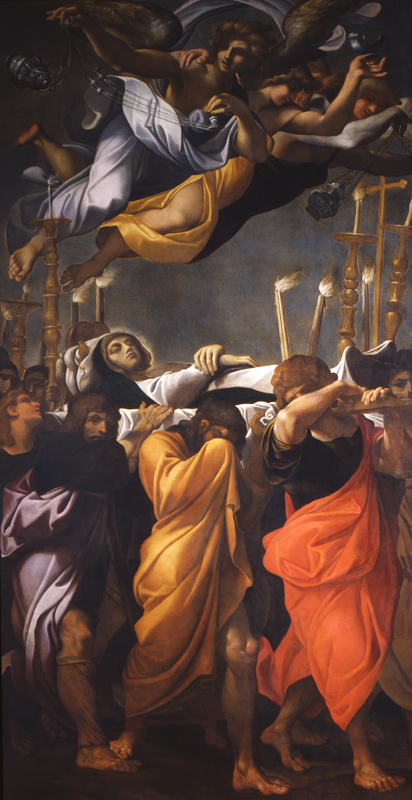
- Artist: Ludovico Carracci
- Year: c. 1605-1609
- Medium: oil on canvas
- Dimensions: 665 cm × 345 cm (262 in × 136 in)
- Location: Galleria nazionale di Parma, Parma

The Funeral of the Virgin Mary is an oil painting on canvas executed c. 1605–1609 by the Italian painter Ludovico Carracci. It is held in the Galleria nazionale di Parma.

== History ==
Carracci produced this work, its pendant The Apostles at the Virgin's Tomb and other frescoes for the chancel of the Duomo di Piacenza, dedicated to the Virgin Mary. They were commissions from Claudio Rangoni, bishop and nobleman. Their dating is based on letters from the artist himself, who in 1606 wrote to Ferrante Carlo that he was too busy to send the painting he requested "having already begun a large work for the most illustrious Bishop of Piacenza". Following the Treaty of Tolentino and looting by Napoleon's troops, Funeral and Apostles were both taken to France in 1796. Only in 1816 were they and other works returned to Piacenza, where they were exhibited in the new Galleria Ducale.

== Description ==
The work depicts the moment when the body of the Virgin, carried by the apostles and accompanied by four angels with the thurible, makes its journey to the tomb. Some scholars have noted the way how Ludovico represented the scene, portraying the large human figures and with a "dark density" of color, while others have identified in the particular choice of colors references to the chromatic tones of Venetian painting. In this work, Ludovico chooses to underline the drama of the scene through charged and theatrical gestures according to a taste that reflects the pictorial values of the Counter-Reformation.

== Bibliography (in Italian) ==
- Daniela Ferriani, Scheda dell'opera, in Fornari Schianchi (a cura di), Galleria Nazionale di Parma. Catalogo delle opere dall'Antico al Cinquecento, Milano, 1997.
- A.O. Quintavalle, La Regia Galleria di Parma, Roma, 1939.
- A. Stanzani, Il regesto della vita e delle opere di Ludovico, 1993, pp. 199–268.
