= Susannah and the Elders (Guercino) =

Painting by Guercino

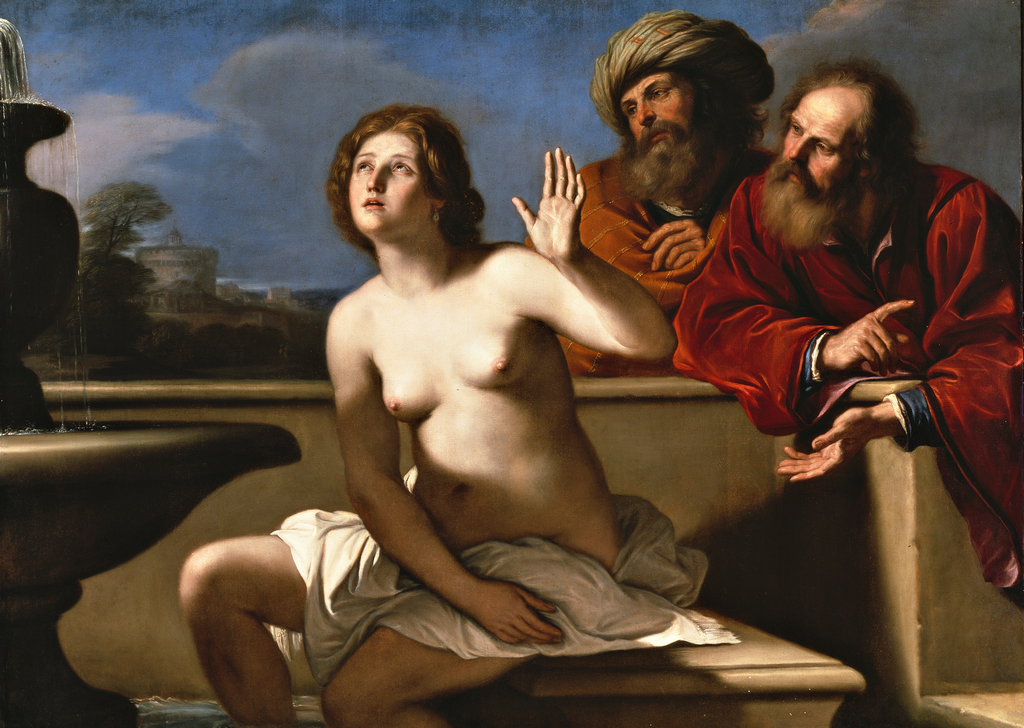
Susannah and the Elders (1650) by Guercino

Susannah and the Elders is a 1650 oil on canvas painting, now in the National Gallery in Parma.

== History ==
It was commissioned by Paolo Parisetti (1602 - 1661), a count from Reggio-Emilia and a collector of contemporary Bolognese artists who was particularly interesting in moralising or devotional works. The artist's account book mentions the payment on 25 May 1650, but the commission may have been up to a year earlier. It remained in collections in Reggio-Emilia until the early 20th century, when it was inherited by Maria Calvi Tornielli Parisetti, a count in Parma, who sold it to its present owners in 1907.
