= Mystic Marriage of Saint Catherine (Parmigianino, Parma) =

Painting by Parmigianino

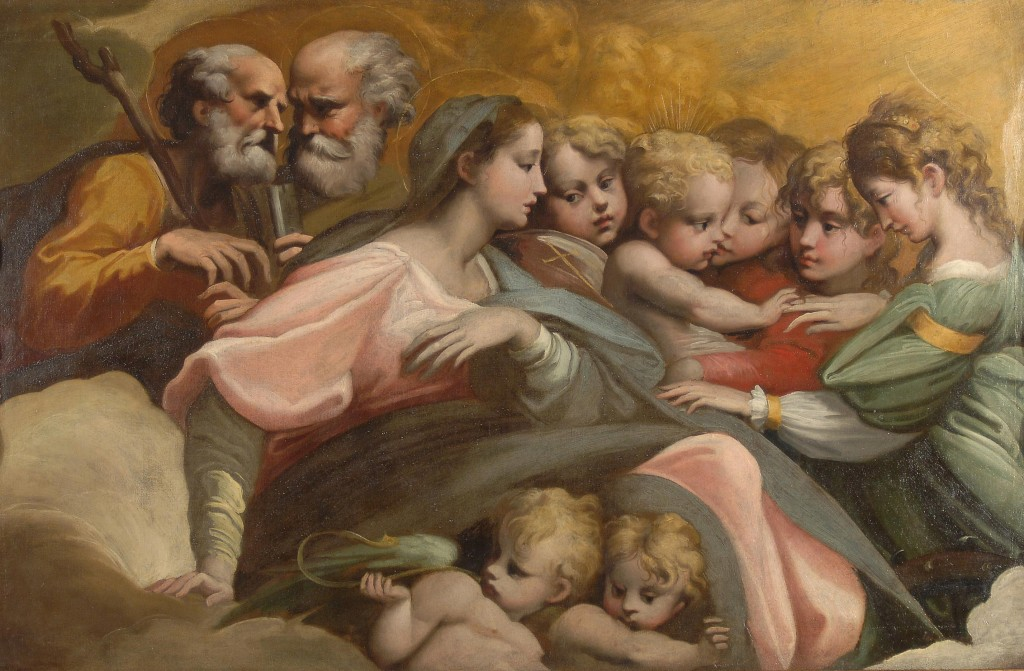
Mystic Marriage of Saint Catherine (c. 1524) by Parmigianino

Mystic Marriage of Saint Catherine or Mystic Betrothal of Saint Catherine is a c.1524 oil on canvas painting by the Italian Renaissance painter Parmigianino. The work is now in the Galleria nazionale di Parma. Art historians argue that the work may be attributed to the period in which Parmigianino was painting his first works in the church of San Giovanni Evangelista, as also emerges from a recent restoration, which has shown that its technique is near-identical to that of Parmigianino - "no underdrawing, pigment use, descriptive speed, drafting of final shadows, using fingers (may fingerprints have been traced) and brush-ends as tools".

The work was left to the church of San Giovanni Evangelista in Parma in the late 1500s as part of a legacy from Tiberio Dolfini, a writer, physician and theologian linked to Alessandro Farnese, 3rd Duke of Parma. Art historians have noted that the left-hand putto under Mary's hand is almost a twin copy of that painted by Parmigianino under the north arch of the dome in San Giovanni Evangelista, though it may be a mid 1520s study later used for that putto rather than vice versa. The present state of the work makes it impossible to define its origins precisely.

== Bibliography ==
- (in Italian) Anna Coliva, Scheda dell'opera; in Lucia Fornari Schianchi (a cura di) "Galleria Nazionale di Parma. Catalogo delle opere, il Cinquecento", Milano, 1998
- (in Italian) Anna Coliva, "Parmigianino, monografia", in "Art e Dossier", Firenze, 1993
- (in Italian) P. Rossi, "Parmigianino, l'opera completa", Milano, 1980
- (in Italian) L. Fornari Schianchi, Scheda dell'opera in “Parma. “Grazia e affetti, natura e artificio. Protagonisti dell'arte da Correggio a Lanfranco.””, Tokio, 2007
- (in Portuguese) Entry in “Mestres do Renascimento. Obras – PrimasItalianas”, exhibition catalogue, Brasile, San Paolo, 2013, p. 163
