= Bartolomeo Schedoni =

Italian painter (1578–1615)

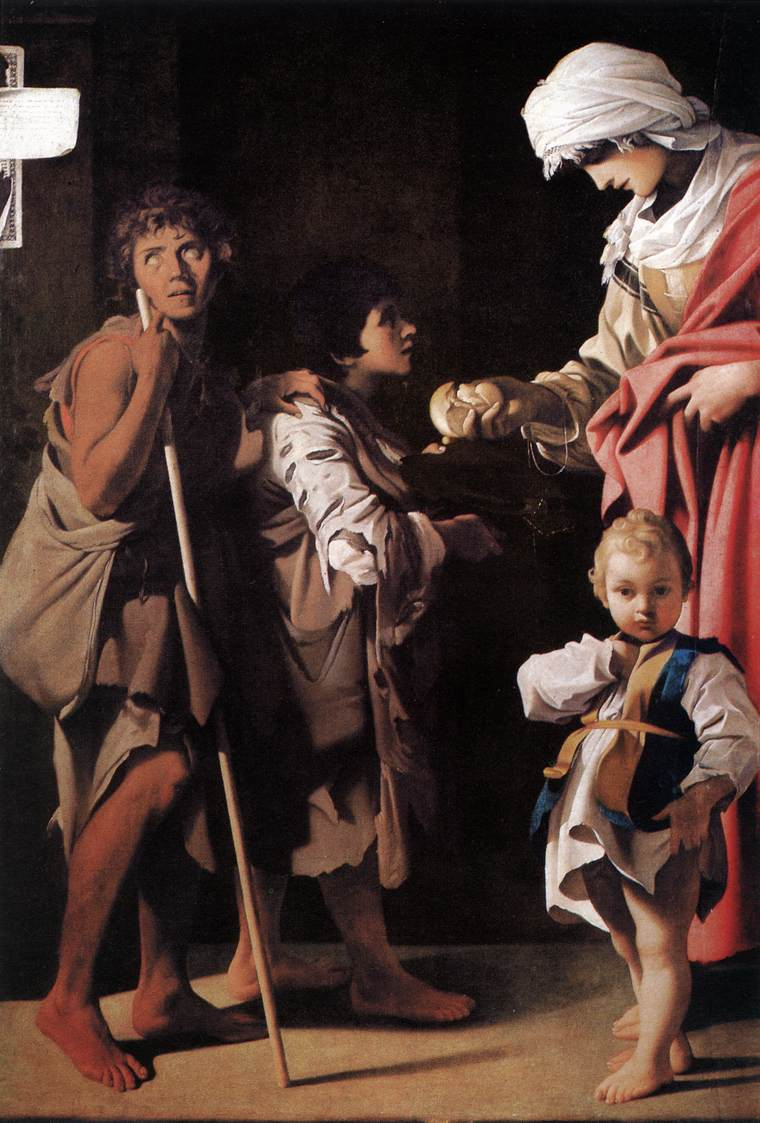
- Bartolomeo Schedoni, Charity, 1611, Museo di Capodimonte, Naples
- Born: 1578; Modena, Duchy of Modena and Reggio
- Died: 23 December 1615 (aged 36–37); Parma, Duchy of Parma
- Education: Federico Zuccari
- Known for: Painting
- Movement: Baroque

Bartolomeo Schedoni (sometimes Schedone) (1578 – 23 December 1615) was an Italian early Baroque painter from Modena.

== Biography ==
He was born in Modena, and moved to Parma with his father, a mask-maker who served the Farnese court. In 1595 Schedoni traveled to Rome, where he apprenticed briefly under Federico Zuccari with the sponsorship of Ranuccio I Farnese, Duke of Parma. After falling ill, he returned to Parma. The baroque art historian Count Carlo Cesare Malvasia (1616–1693) claims that Schedoni trained under Annibale Carracci in Bologna, although this is questionable; his early work reveals instead his study of Correggio's works in Parma.

Schedoni's earliest known commission was in 1598. He left Parma after an imprisonment for assault, and relocated to Modena. There he served as painter to the court of Cesare d’Este, and collaborated with Ercole dell'Abate in decorating the ceiling of the Sala del Consiglio Vecchio of the Palazzo Comunale. After an interruption caused by Schedoni's imprisonment for another altercation, this work was completed in July 1607.

After December 1607, he worked in Parma for the court of Ranuccio I. The duke greatly esteemed Schedoni, and gave him a farm at Felegara when Schedoni married in 1611. Schedoni's works included small devotional images and the large altarpiece Holy Family in Glory Worshipped by SS John the Baptist, Francis of Assisi, Lawrence and Peregrinus.

Schedoni died on 23 December 1615. According to the Modenese chronicler Giovanni Battista Spaccini, he died in a "fit of passion"—possibly a suicide—after a night of heavy gambling losses.

== Style ==
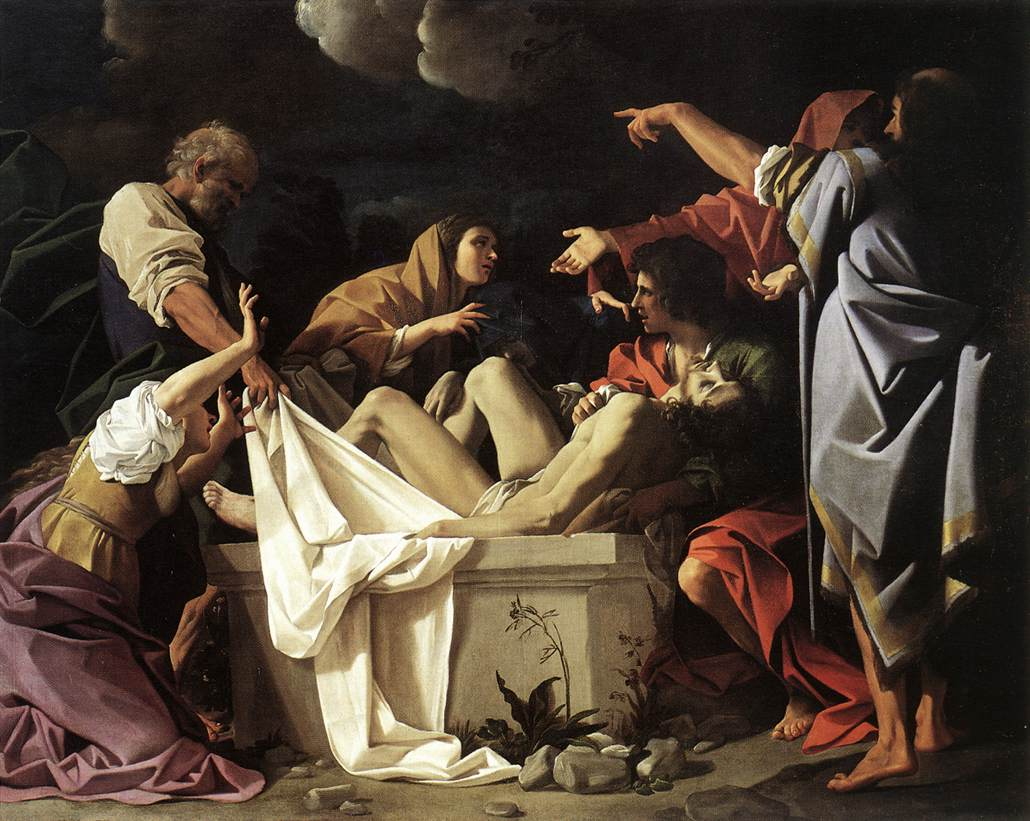
Deposition, 1613, Galleria Nazionale of Parma

Schedoni's paintings often depict brilliantly lit figures set against a dark background. Great emphasis is given to the angular patterns of brightly colored drapery, which, according to the art historian Lawrence Gowing, "almost obscure the narrative content of the scene and instead disseminate a pervading sense of emotional emergency."

Schedoni's late manner shows the influence of Ludovico Carracci. Another important influence on Schedoni's style and subjects was Caravaggio, whose Entombment of Christ (1603–04) provided the prototype for Schedoni's Deposition (c. 1613) in the Galleria Nazionale of Parma. The Parmesan painter Giovanni Lanfranco was among those who found inspiration in Schedoni's theatrical style.

Schedoni's masterpieces are in the Galleria Nazionale of Parma, and were the two paintings intended for the altar of the church of the Capuchin convent in Fontevivo, near Parma.

== Selected works ==
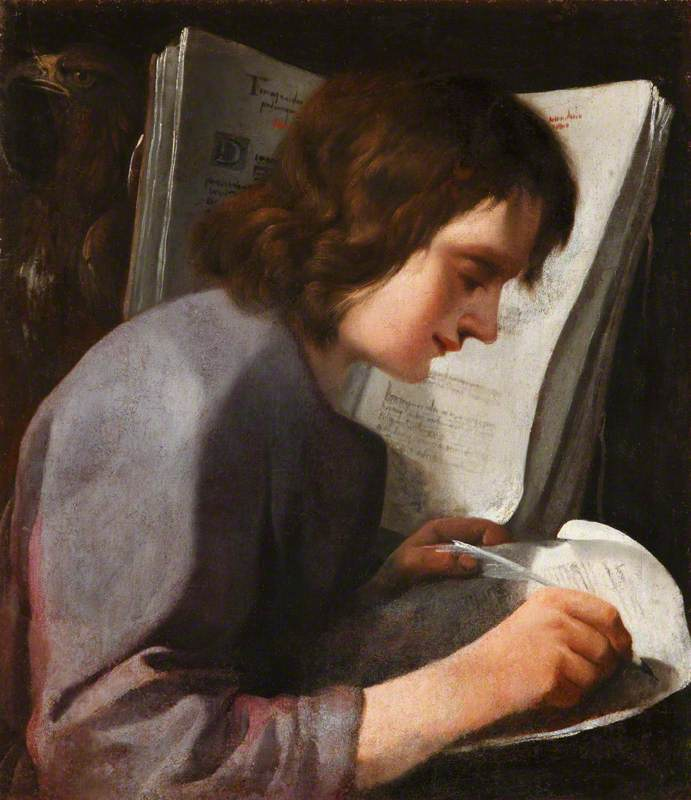
Saint John the Evangelist, c. 1598–1615, National Trust, London

- Deposition (c. 1610), Louvre, Paris;
- Charity (1611), 1611, Museo di Capodimonte, Naples;
- Deposition (1613), Galleria Nazionale of Parma, Parma, Italy;
- Saint Elizabeth Giving Alms to the Poor (1613, painted for the Ducal Palace in Parma, before being moved to Naples with the Farnese Collection in 1734 upon being inherited by Charles of Bourbon, then to Rome by the French from 1799 to 1832, before being returned to Naples, initially to the Museo Borbonico then in 1841 to the Royal Palace).
- Saint John the Evangelist, c. 1598–1615, National Trust, London;
- Three Marys at the Tomb (c. 1613–14), Galleria nazionale di Parma, Parma, Italy;
- The Rest on the Flight into Egypt, in a moonlit landscape, oil on softwood panel, priv. col.;
- Penitent Magdalene, oil on panel, Kunsthistorisches Museum, Vienna;
- A boy resting, oil on canvas, Finnish National Gallery, Helsinki;
- The Charity of St. Elizabeth, oil on canvas, Los Angeles County Museum of Art, Los Angeles;
- The Beheading of St. John the Baptist, Trinity Fine Art, London;
- Infant Saint John the Baptist, oil on canvas, Burton Constable Hall, East Riding of Yorkshire.
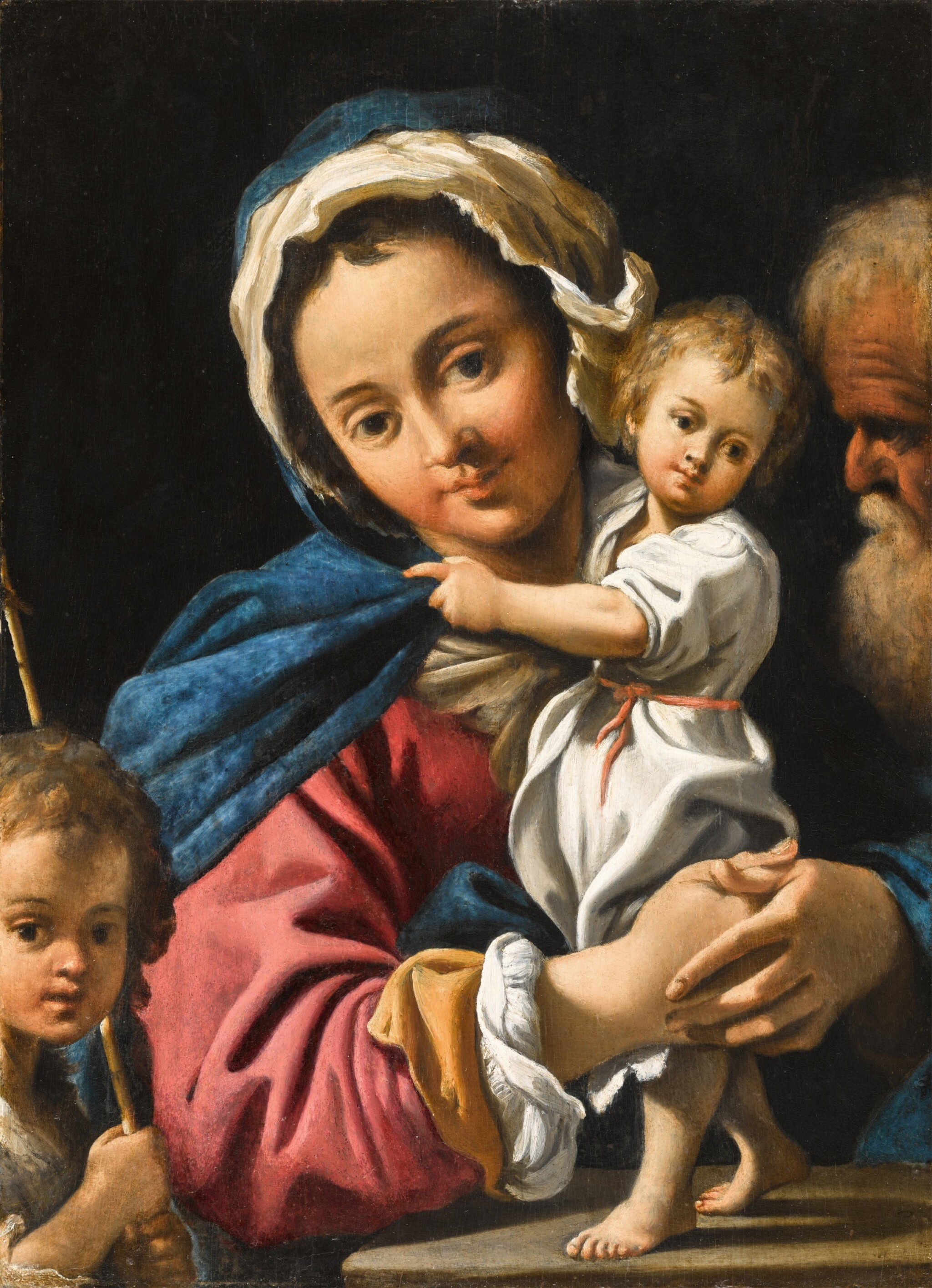
The Holy Family with the infant Saint John the Baptist, oil on walnut panel, priv. col.

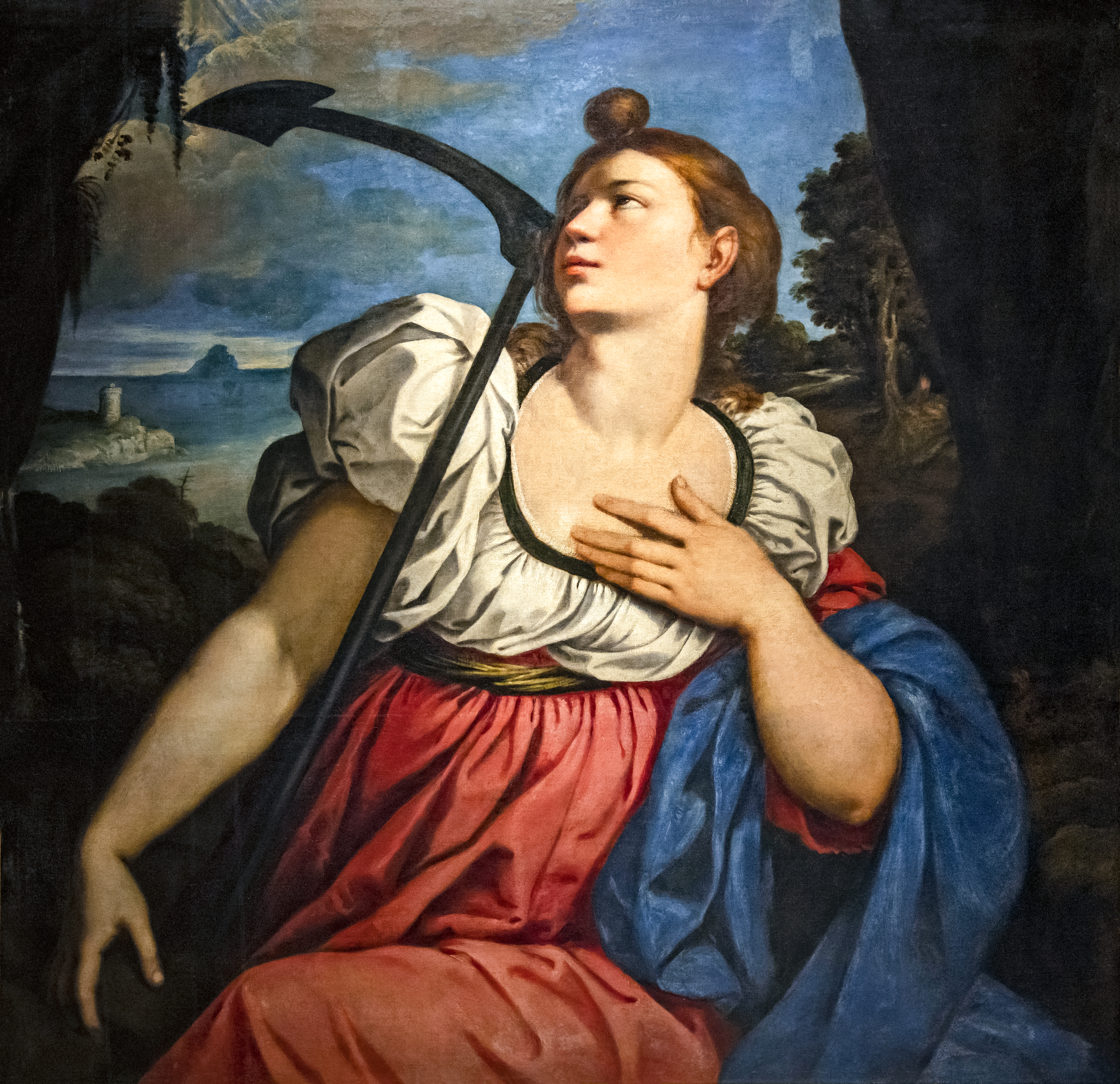
Allegory of Hope, Musée Ingres Bourdelle, Montauban, France

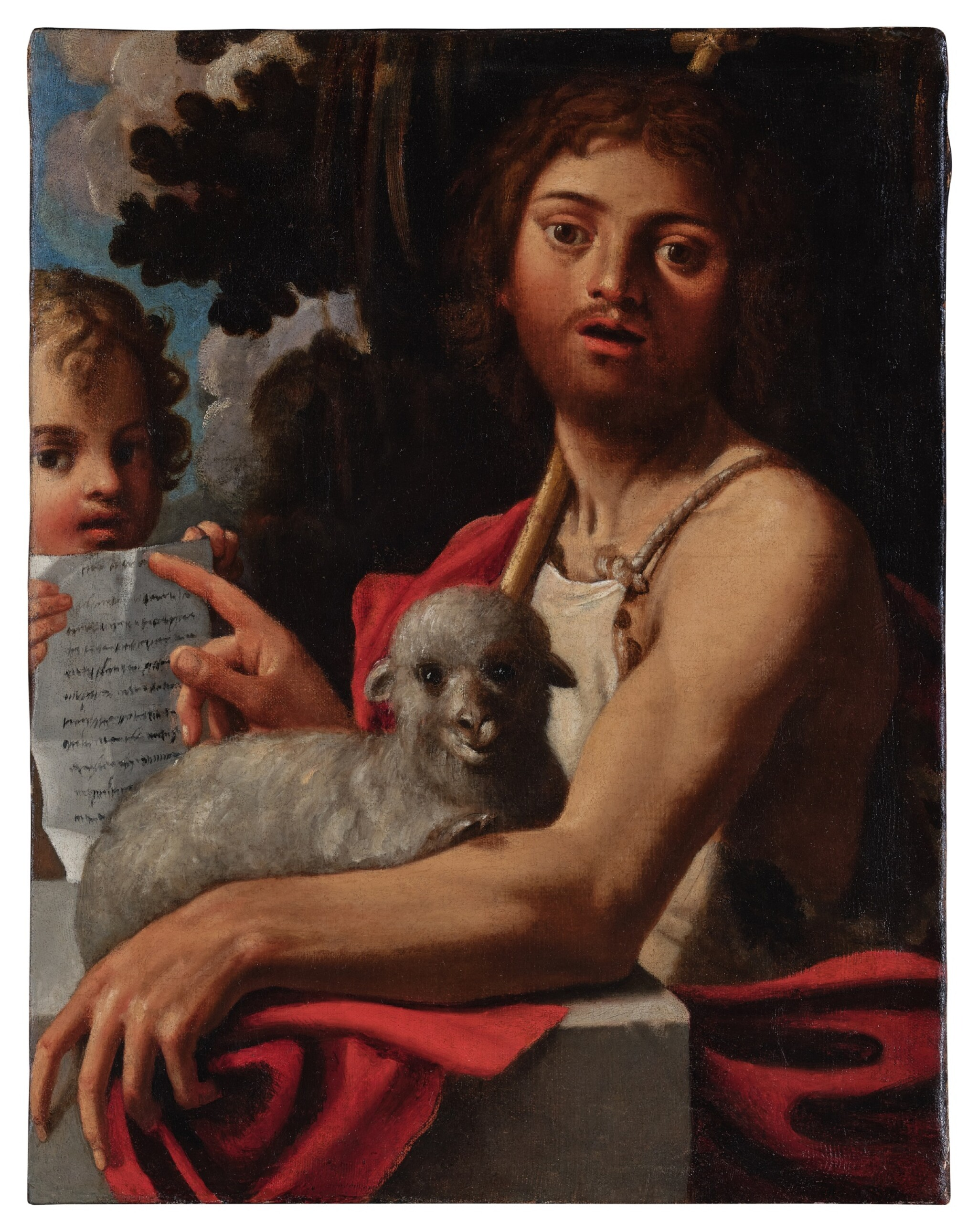
Saint John the Baptist with a Lamb, oil on canvas, priv. col.

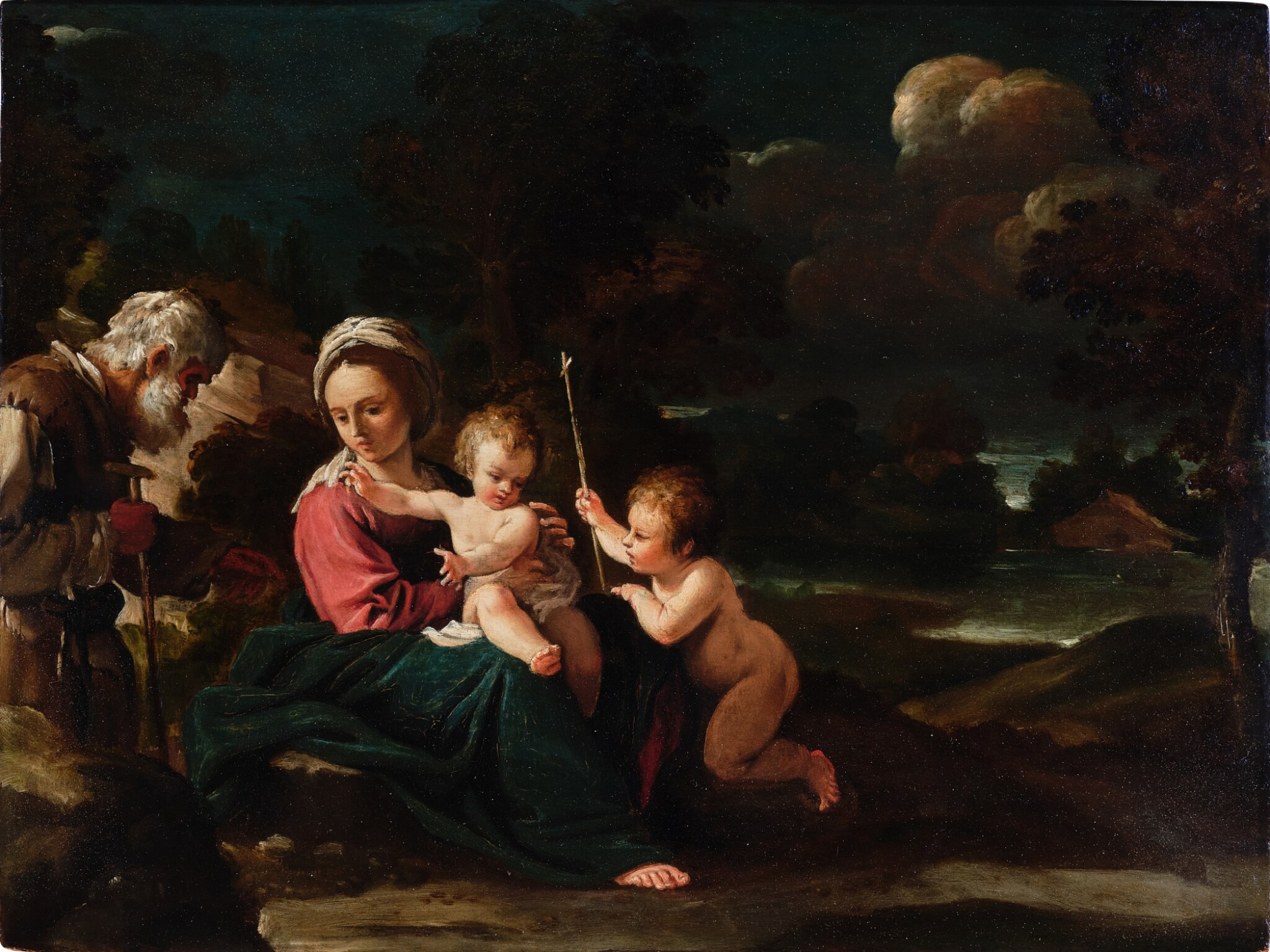
The Rest on the Flight into Egypt, in a moonlit landscape, oil on softwood panel, priv. col.

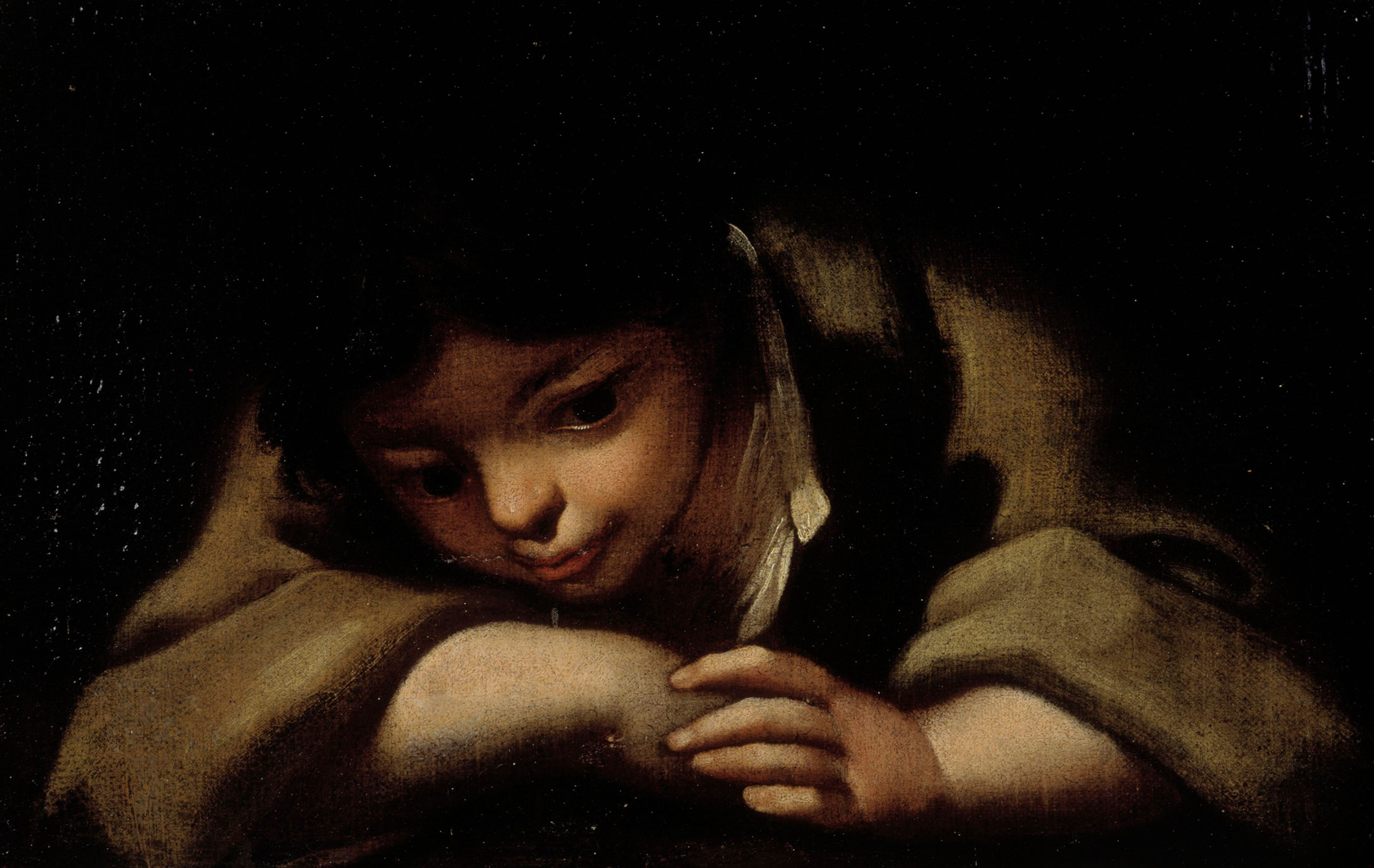
A boy resting, oil on canvas, Finnish National Gallery, Helsinki

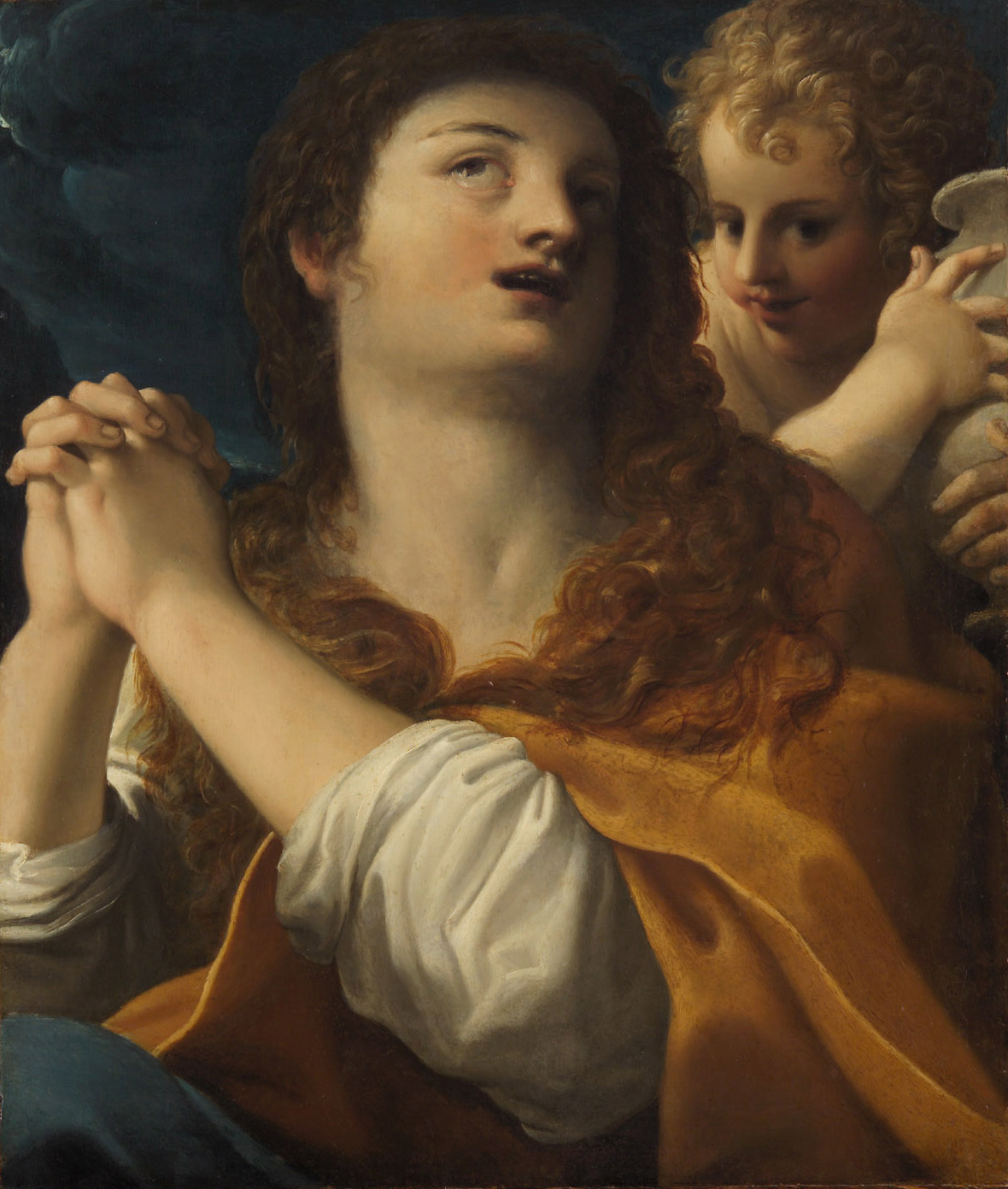
Penitent Magdalene, oil on panel, Kunsthistorisches Museum, Vienna

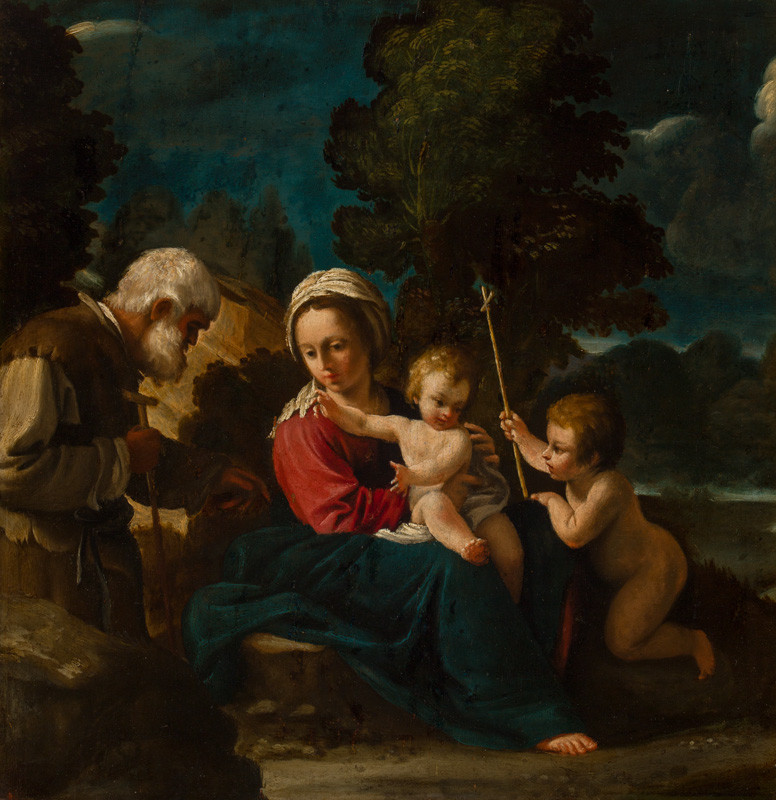
The Holy Family with Infant John the Baptist, oil on panel, National Gallery Prague

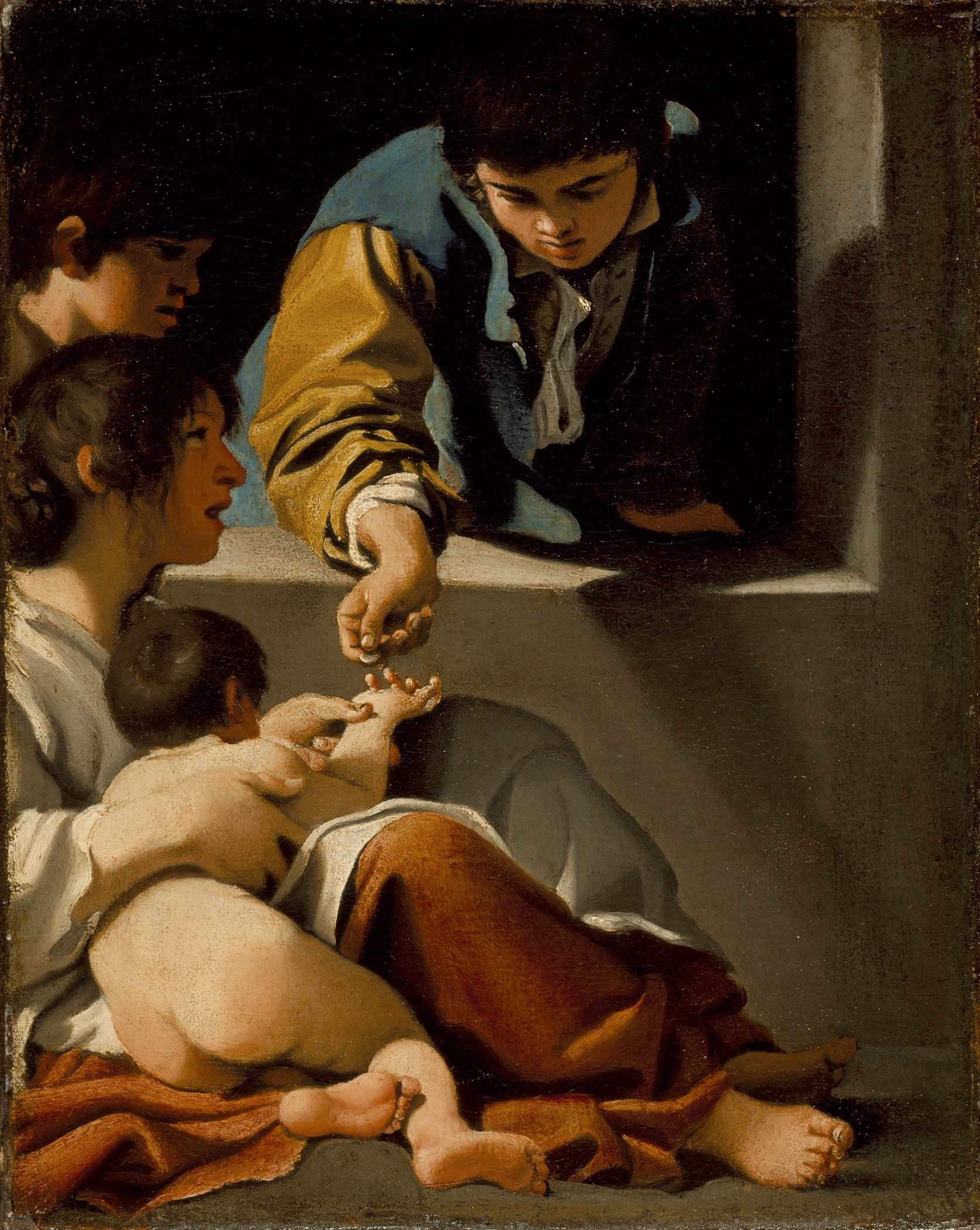
The Charity of St. Elizabeth, oil on canvas, Los Angeles County Museum of Art, Los Angeles

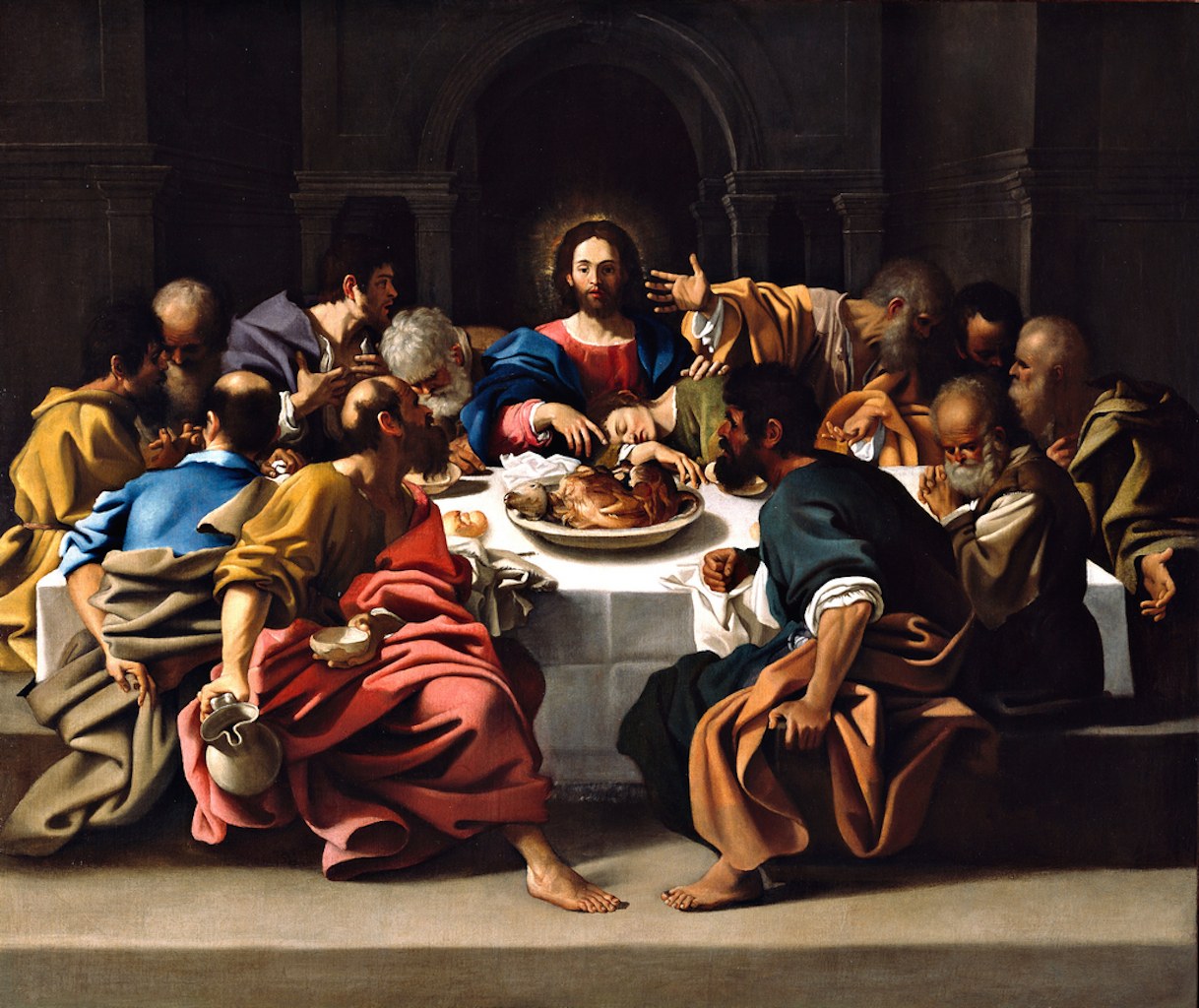
The Last Supper, oil on canvas, Galleria nazionale di Parma, Parma, Italy

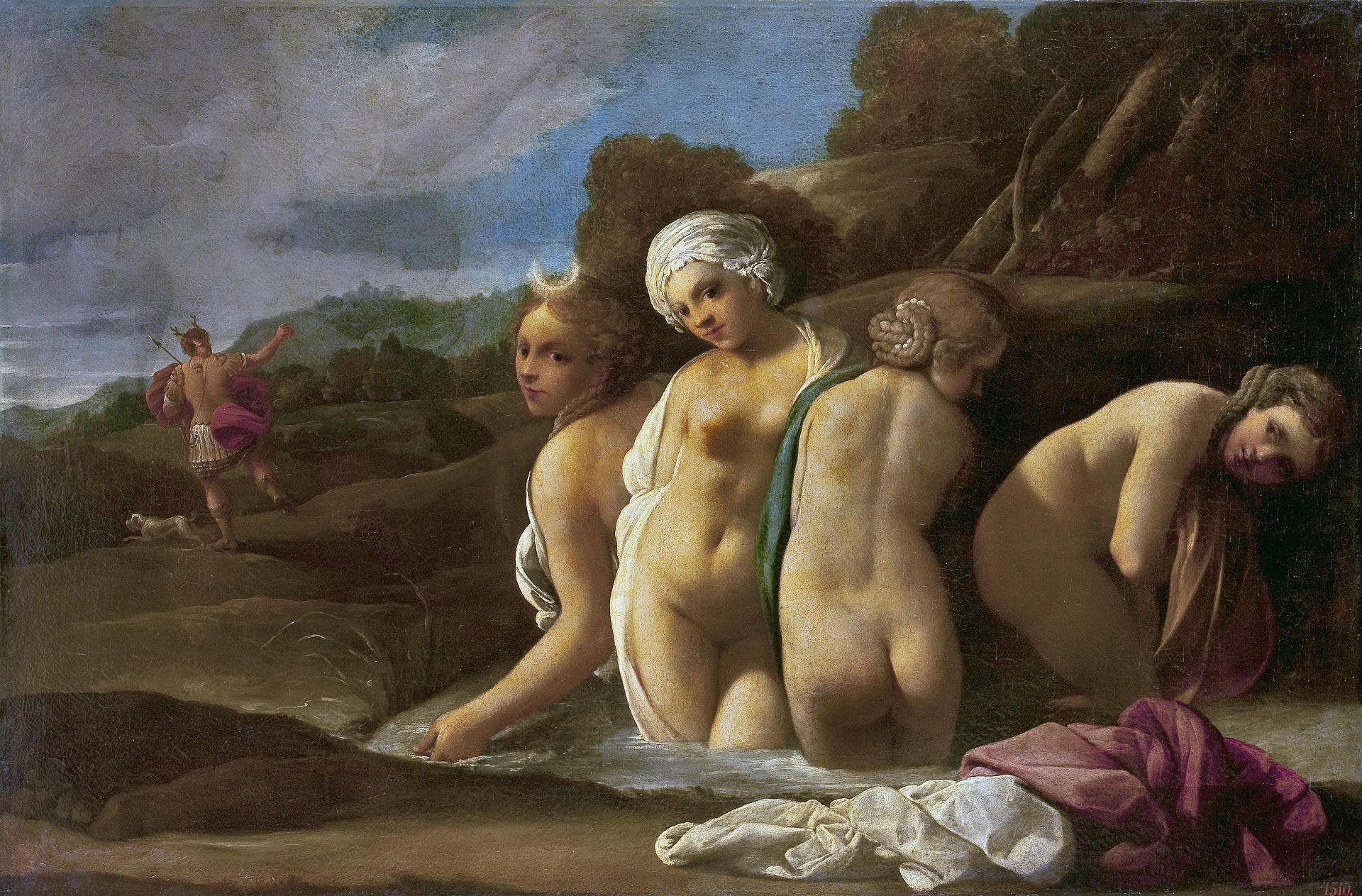
Diana and Actaeon, oil on canvas, Hermitage Museum, Saint Petersburg

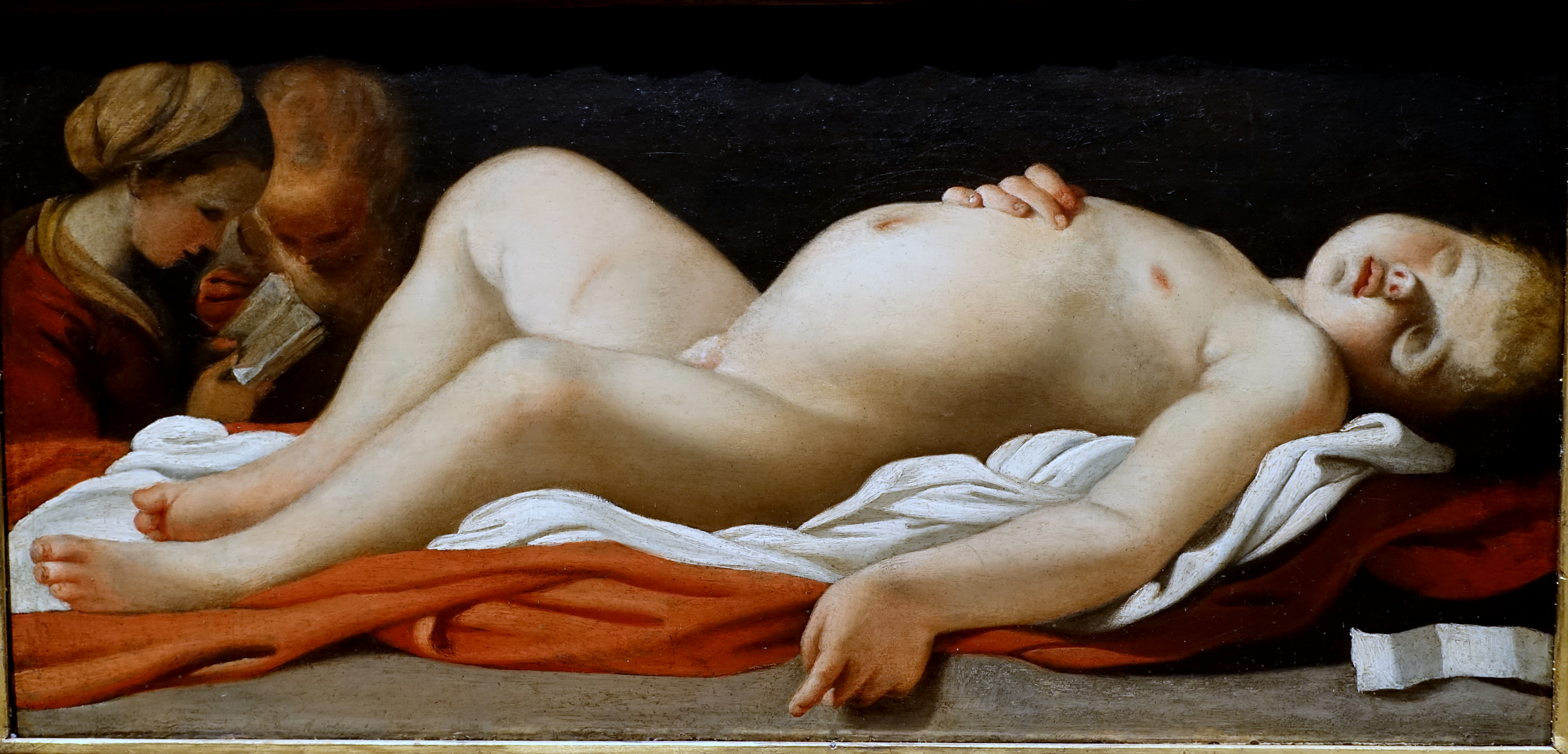
The Sleeping Christ Child with Mary and Joseph, oil on canvas, John and Mable Ringling Museum of Art, Sarasota, Florida

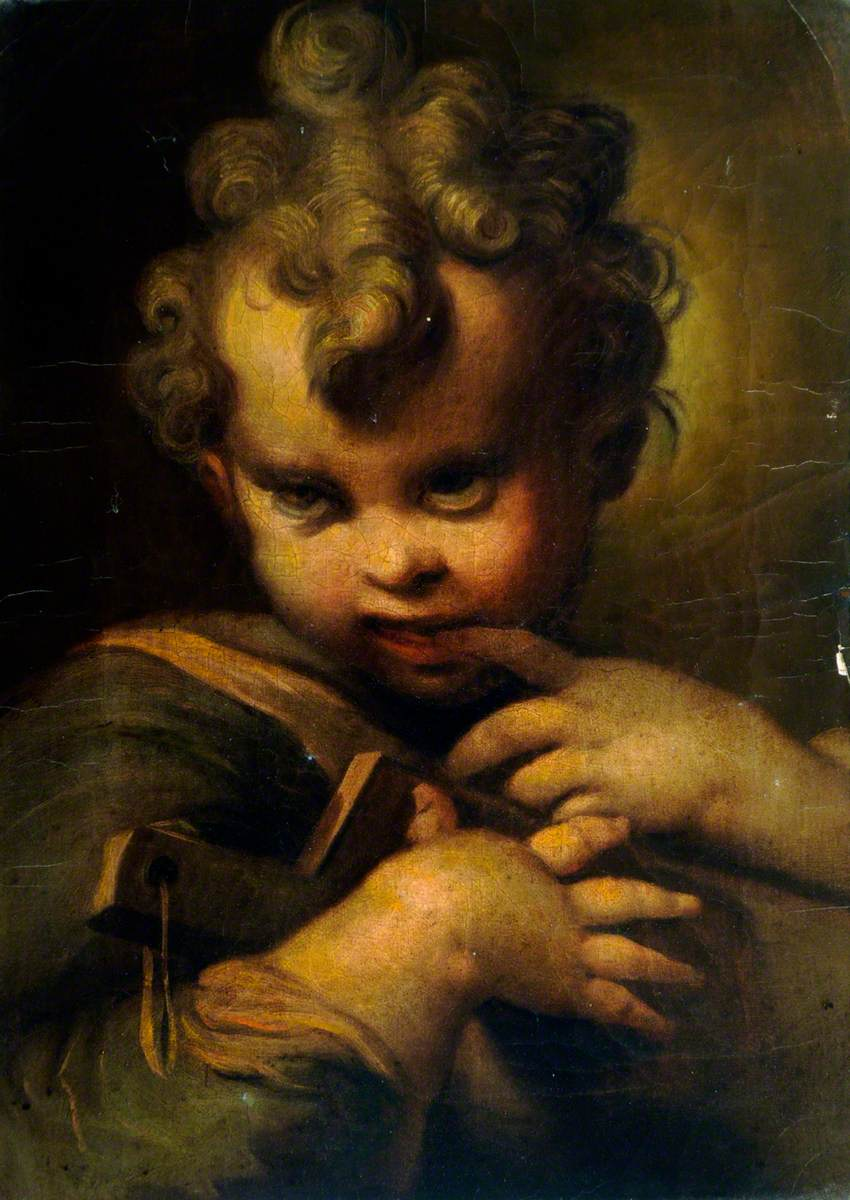
Infant Saint John the Baptist, oil on canvas, Burton Constable Hall, East Riding of Yorkshire

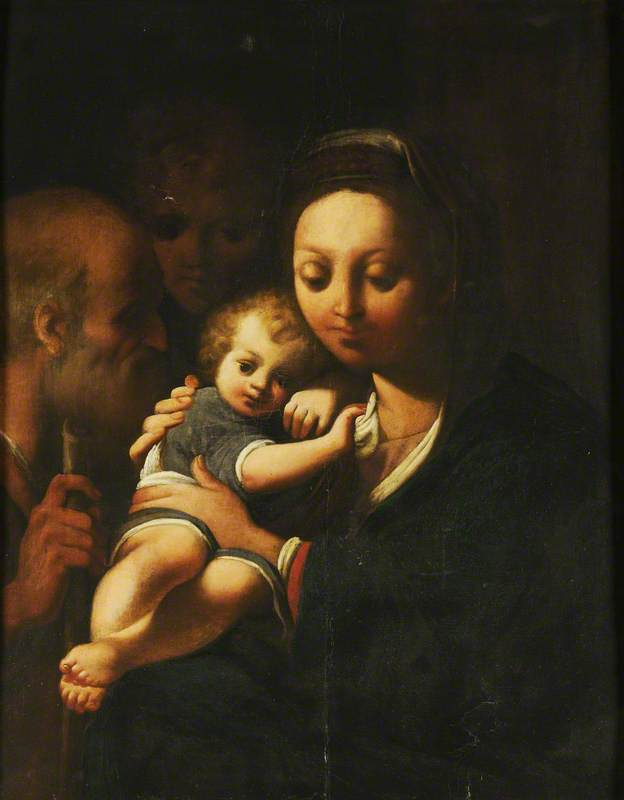
The Holy Family, oil on canvas, Christ Church, Oxford

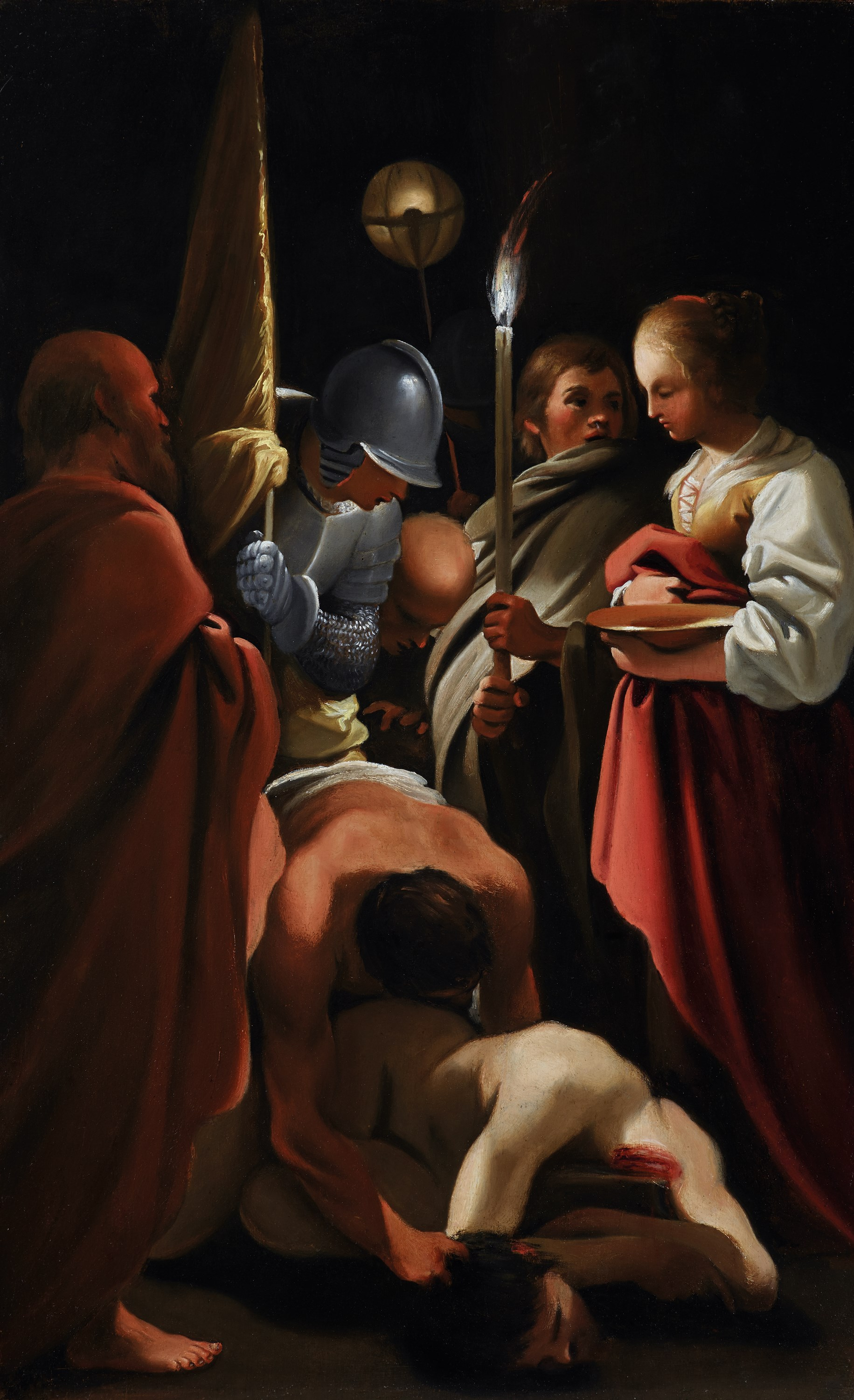
The Beheading of St. John the Baptist, Trinity Fine Art, London

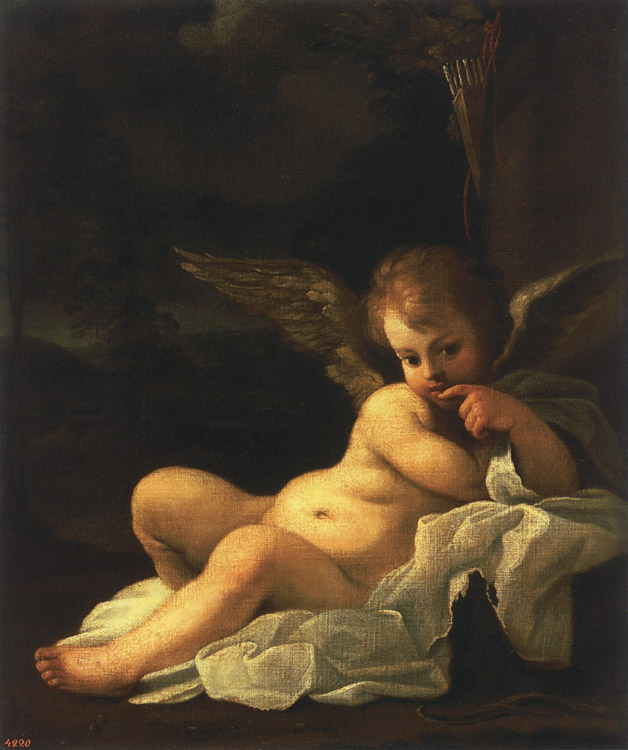
Landscape with cupid, Hermitage Museum, Saint Petersburg

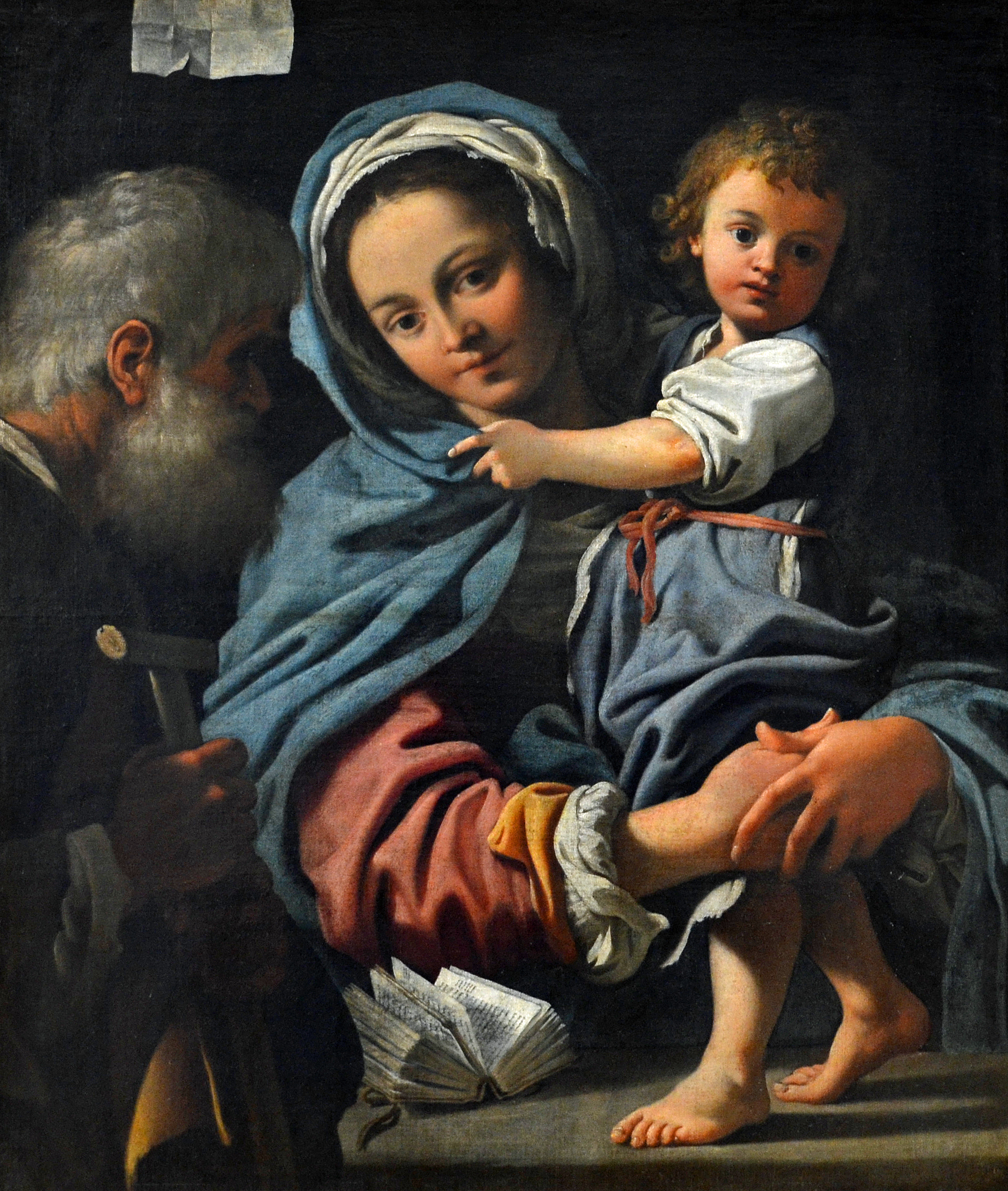
The Holy Family, oil on canvas, Louvre, Paris

== Sources ==
- Francis P. Smyth; John P. O'Neill, eds. (1986). The Age of Correggio and the Carracci: Emilian Painting of the 16th and 17th Centuries. Washington DC: National Gallery of Art. pp. 526–533.
- Horak, M.; Obertelli, F. (April 2016). "Opere di Bartolomeo Schedoni nel piacentino". Panorama Musei. XXI (1).
