= Galleria nazionale di Parma =

Art museum in Italy

Coordinates: 44°48′17.0″N 10°19′33.1″E

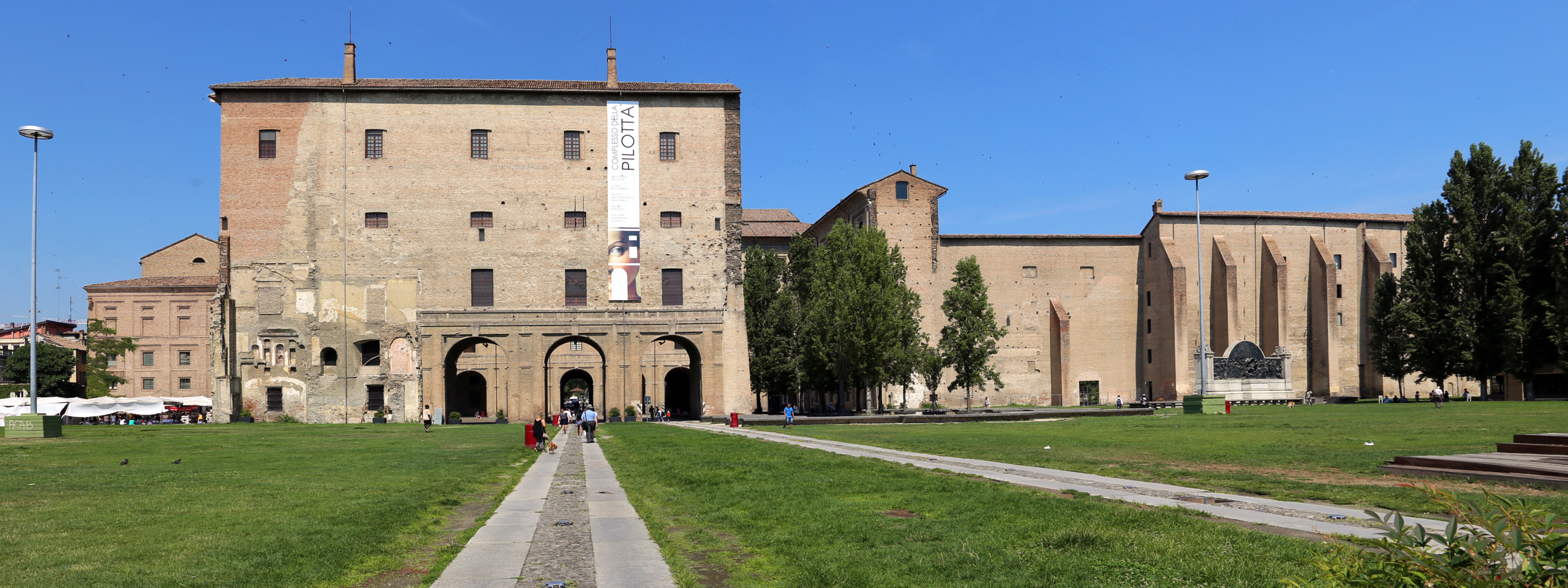
- Location: Piazza della Pilotta, 6 Parma, Italy
- Website: Official website

The Galleria nazionale di Parma is an art gallery in Parma, northern Italy.

Painters exhibited in the museum include Beato Angelico, Fra Angelico, Canaletto, Ludovico Carracci (The Funeral of the Virgin Mary), Agostino Carracci (Madonna and Child with Saints), Correggio, Leonardo da Vinci, Sebastiano del Piombo, Guercino (Susannah and the Elders), Parmigianino (Mystic Marriage of Saint Catherine), Tintoretto, and others.

== History ==
The Parmesan collections were established in Renaissance times by the Farnese family, with Pope Paul III and Cardinal Alessandro Farnese.

In 1734, Charles III of Spain had most of the Farnese Collection moved to Naples. Some were kept thanks to the intervention of Philip, Duke of Parma.

Later, the remaining collection was increased with the addition of Greco-Roman discoveries, donations, and with the restitution of some of the works that had been taken to Naples, as well as, through new acquisitions under Duke Ferdinand (1758).

During the French occupation of Parma (1803–1814), the works were moved to Paris, returning in 1816. Duchess Marie Louise reordered the collections in the Palazzo della Pilotta and built the hall that now bears her name. She also acquired several noble collections in the duchy to avoid their dispersal.

== Gallery ==
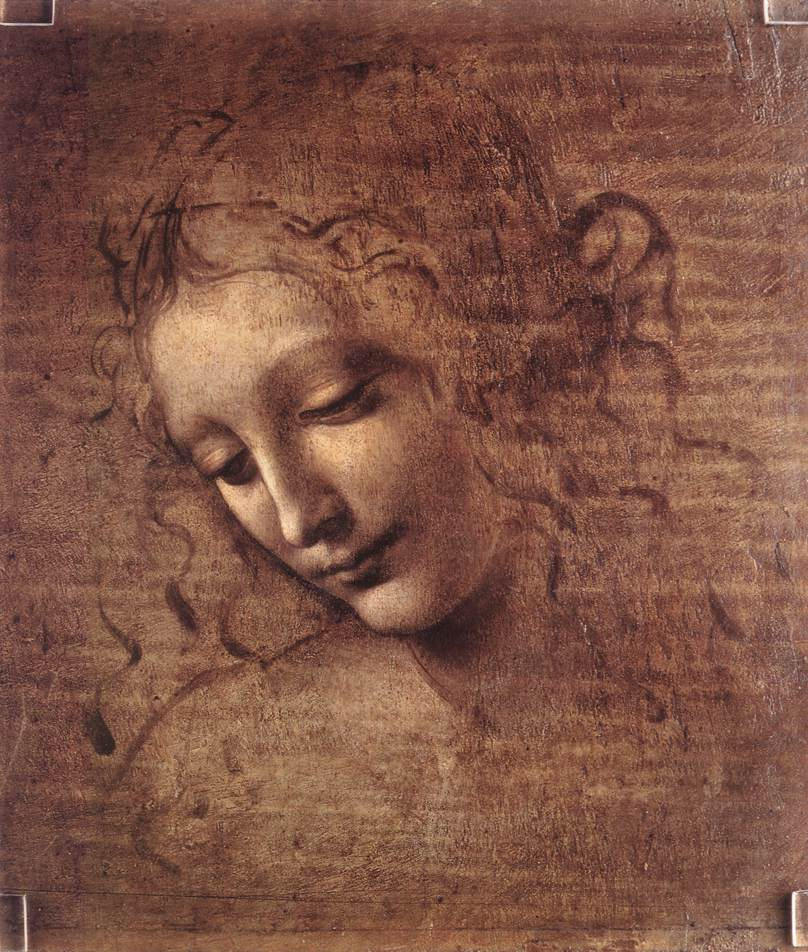
La Scapigliata by Leonardo da Vinci, c. 1508

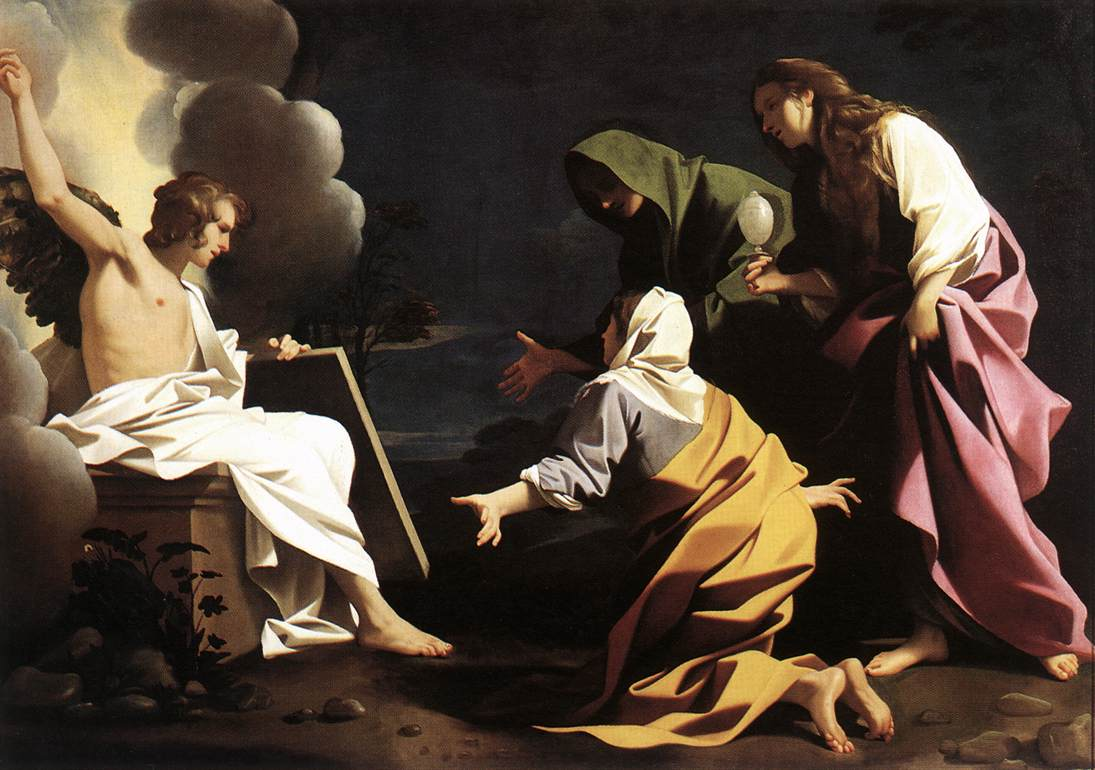
The Two Marys at the Tomb by Bartolomeo Schedoni, c. 1613

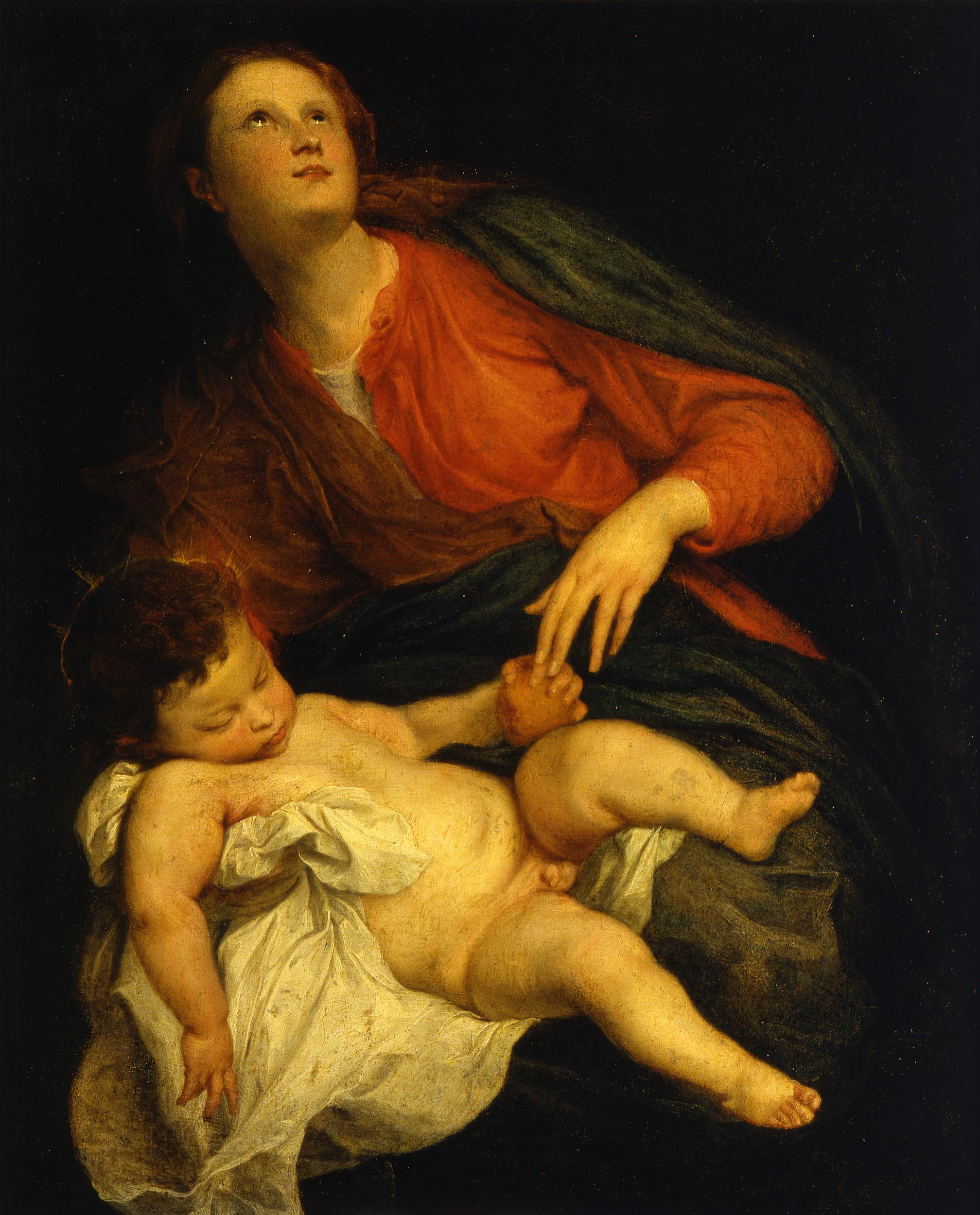
Madonna and Child by Anthony van Dyck, c. 1621-1627

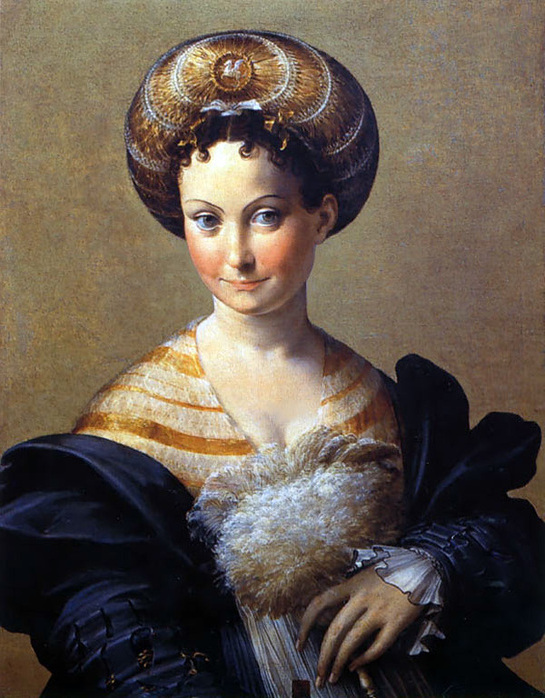
Turkish Slave by Parmigianino, c. 1533

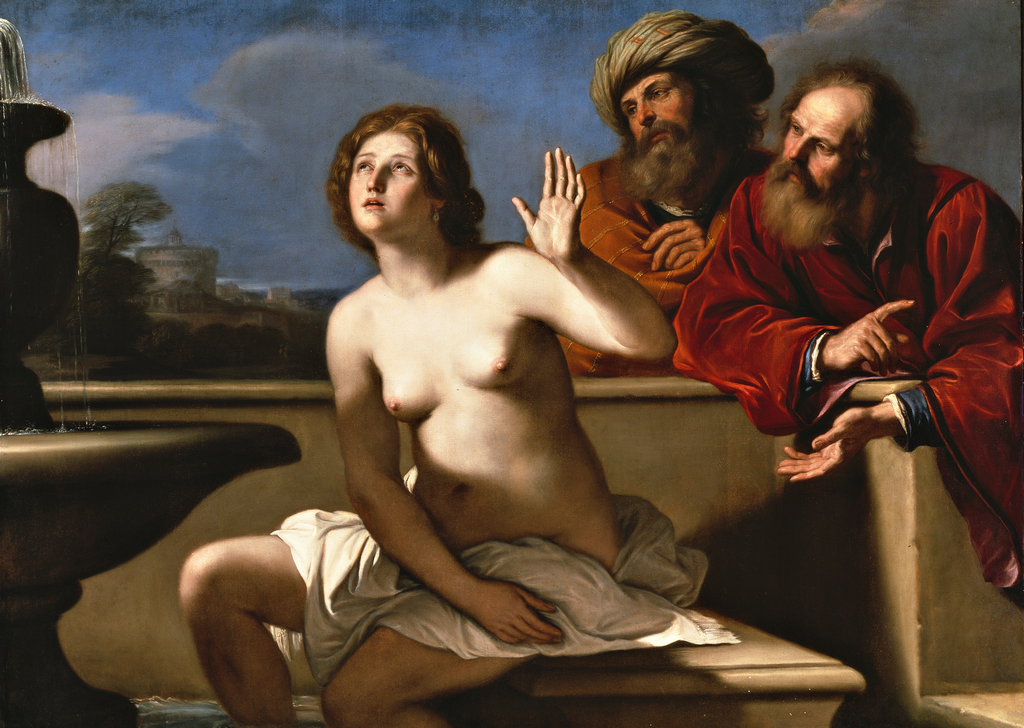
Suzanna and The Elders by Guercino, c. 1649

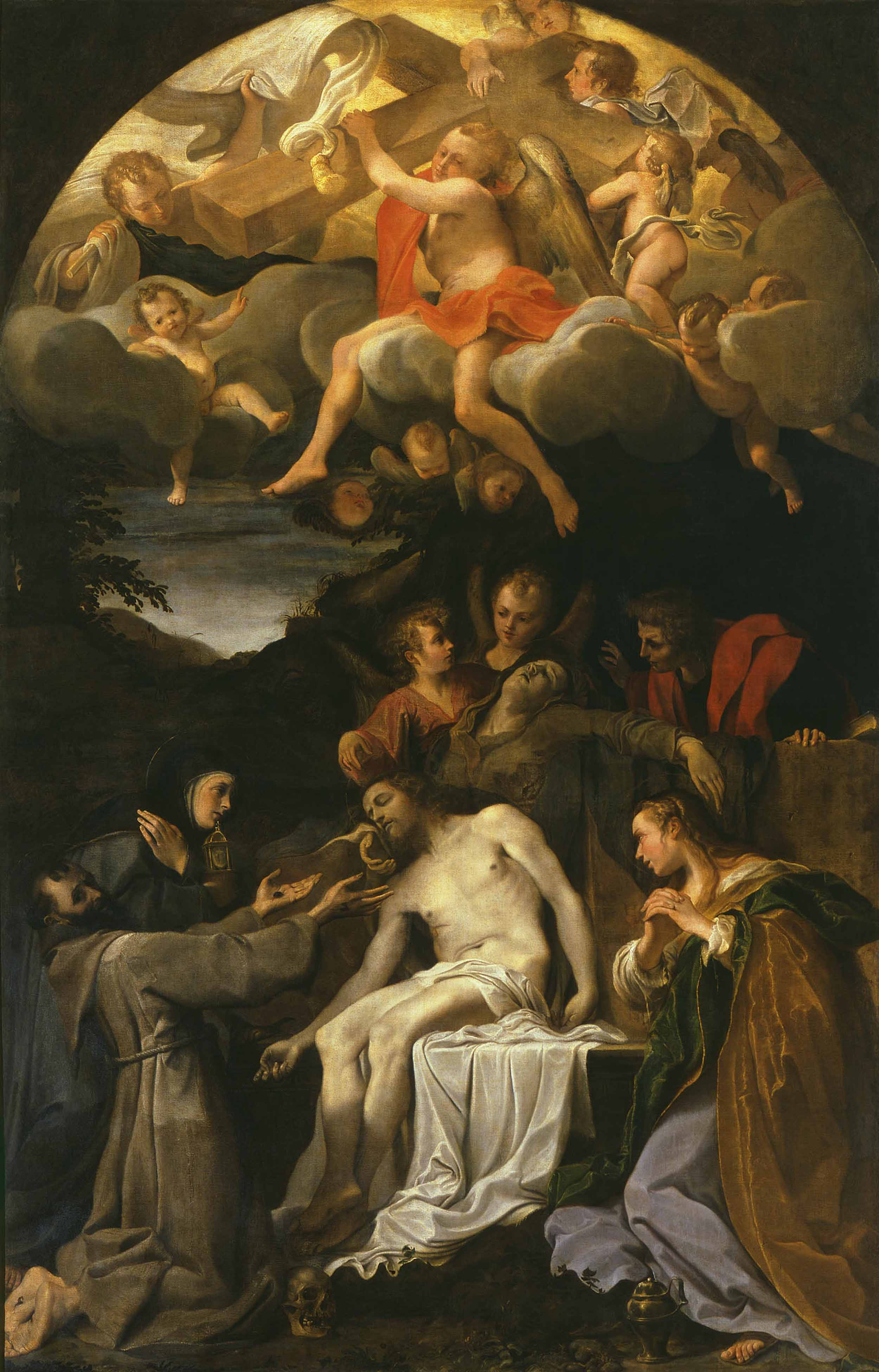
Lamentation over the Dead Christ with Saints by Annibale Carracci

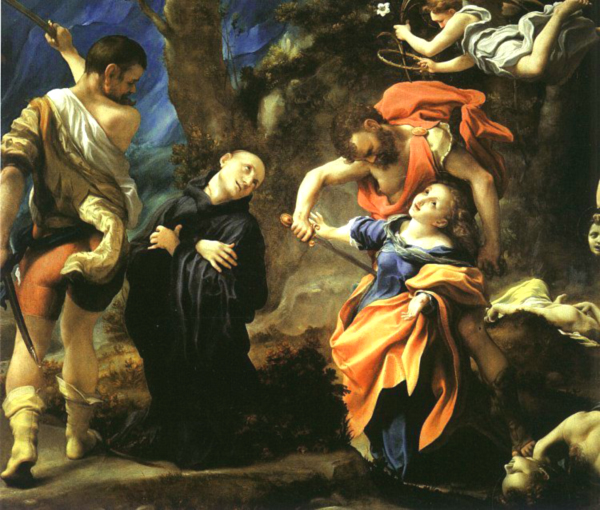
Martyrdom of Four Saints by Antonio Correggio, c. 1524

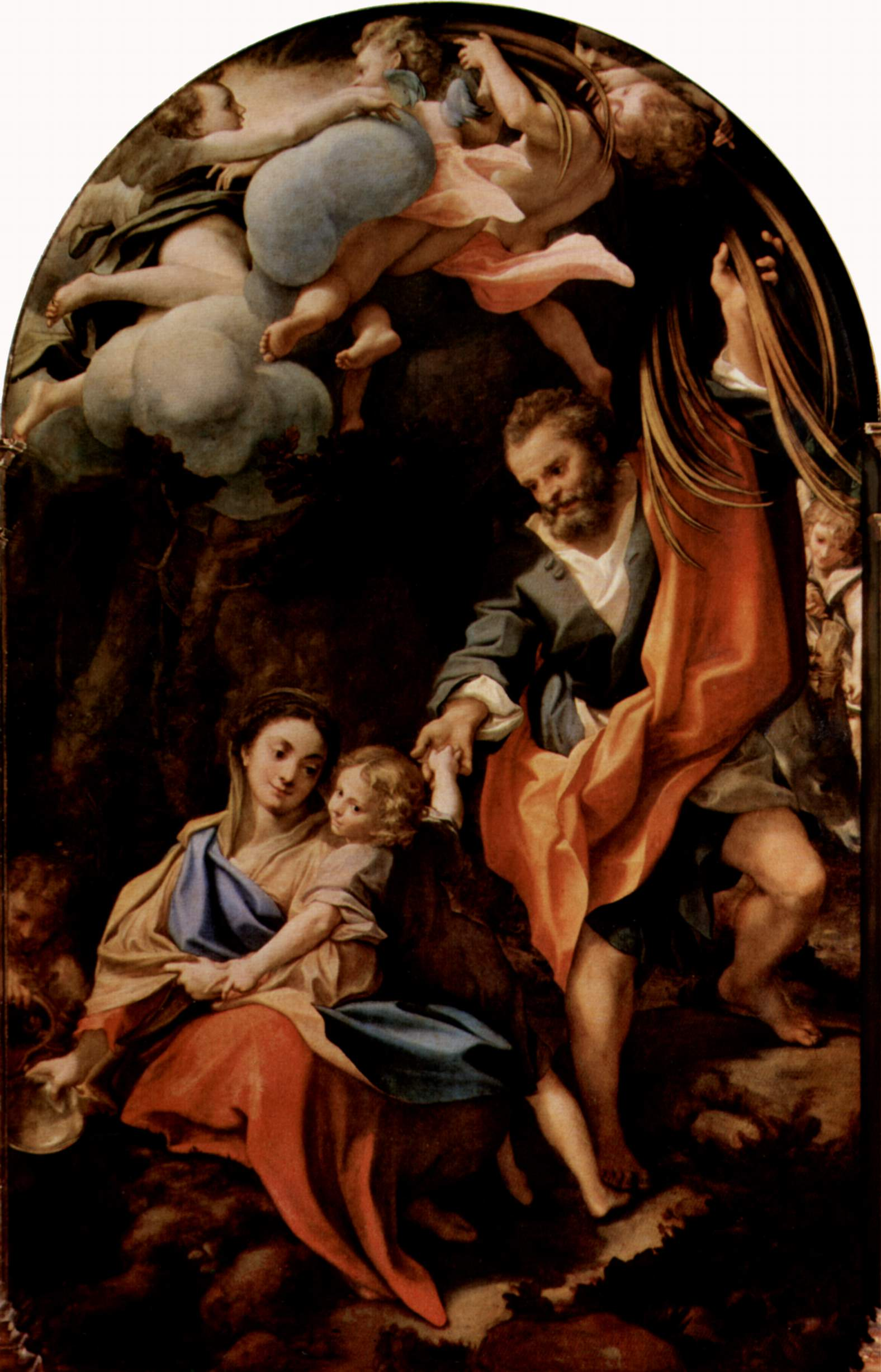
Madonna della Scodella by Correggio, c. 1525-1530

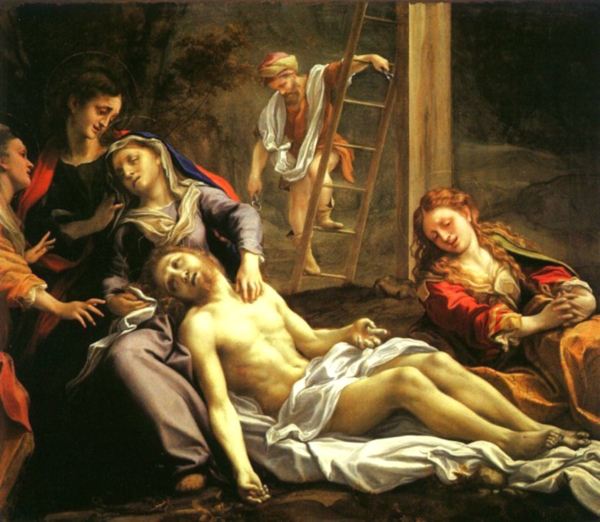
Deposition by Correggio, c. 1522

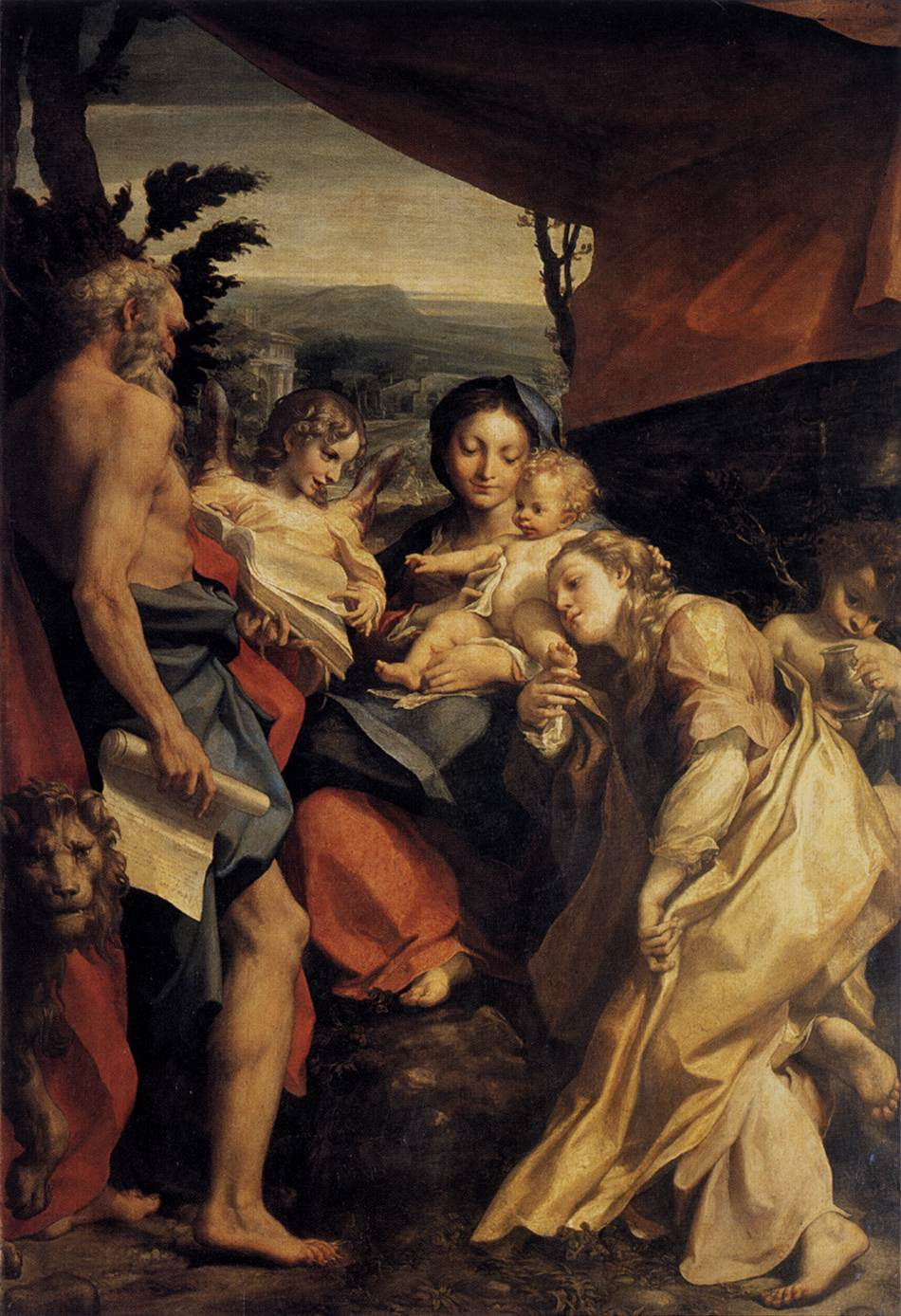
Madonna and Child with St. Jerome and Mary Magdalene by Correggio, c. 1525-1528

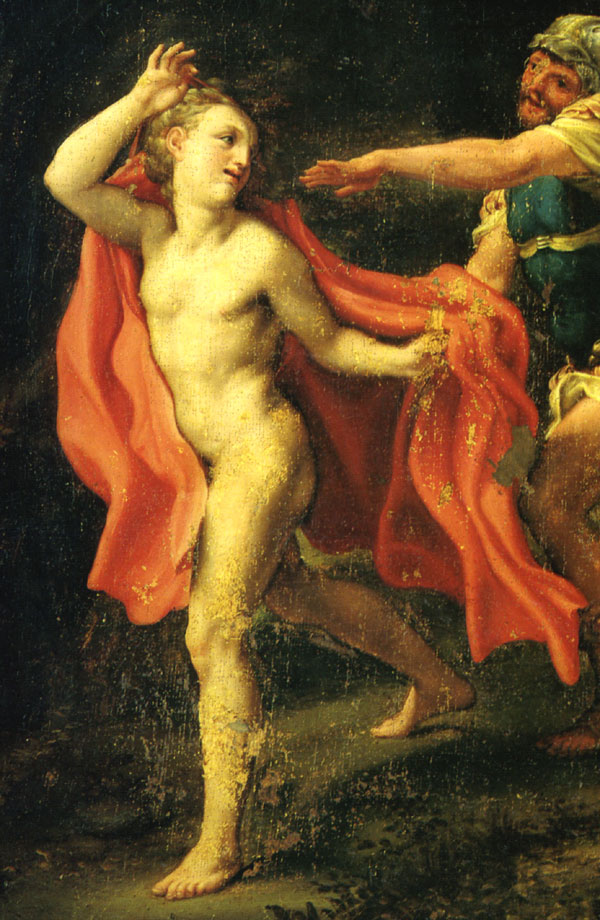
Saint John Fleeing Christ's Arrest, copy (probably by an Emilian artist) of a lost original by Correggio, c. 1522

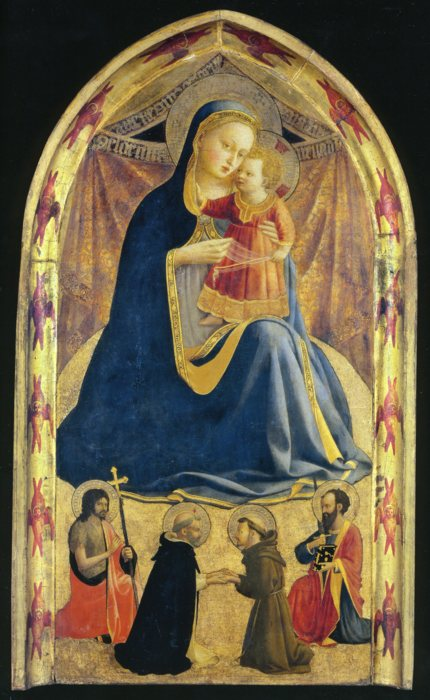
Madonna and Child with Saints by Fra Angelico

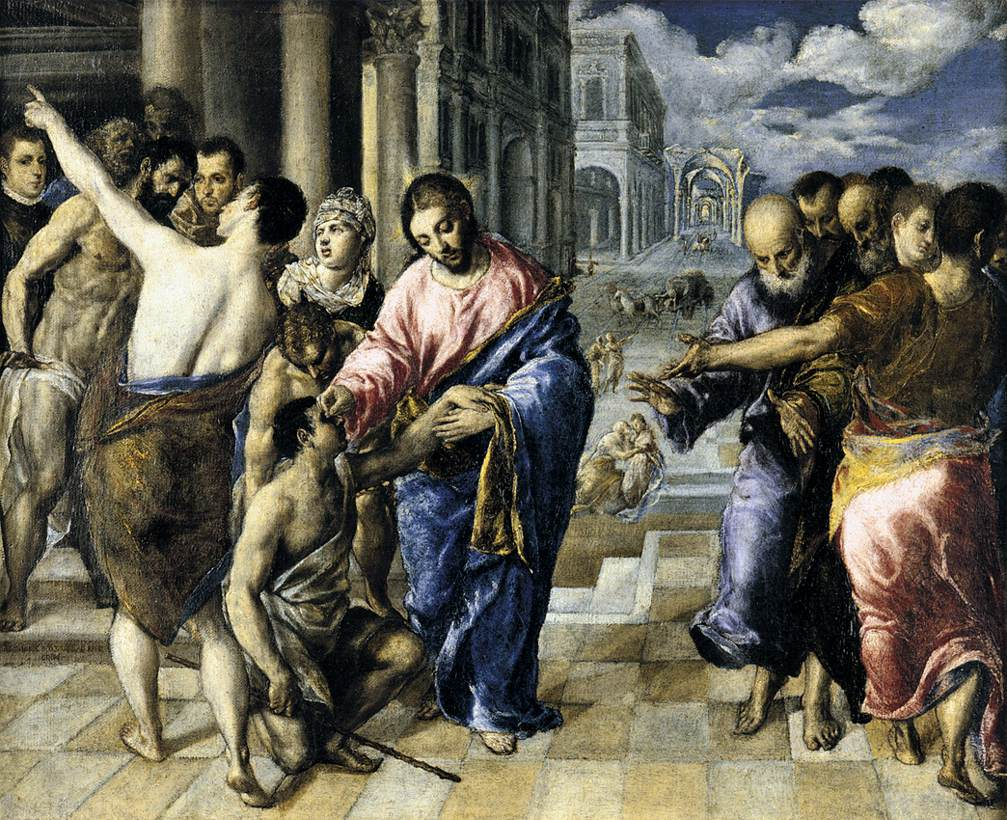
Christ Healing the Blind by El Greco, c. 1570-1575

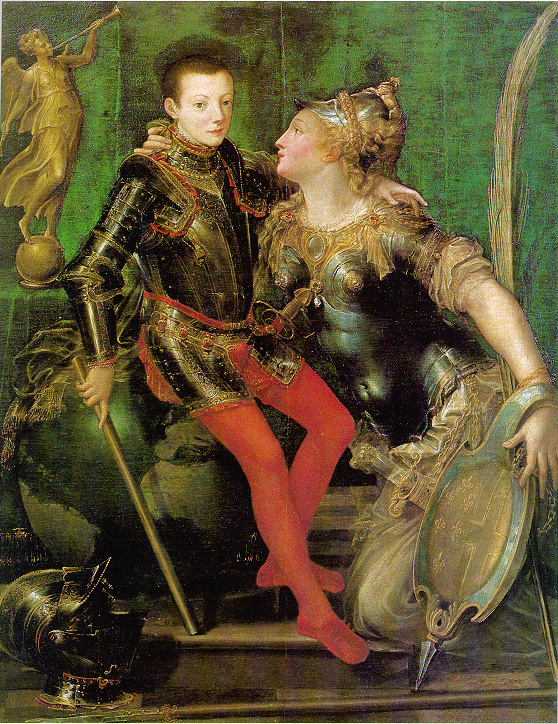
Alessandro Farnese by Girolamo Mazzola Bedoli

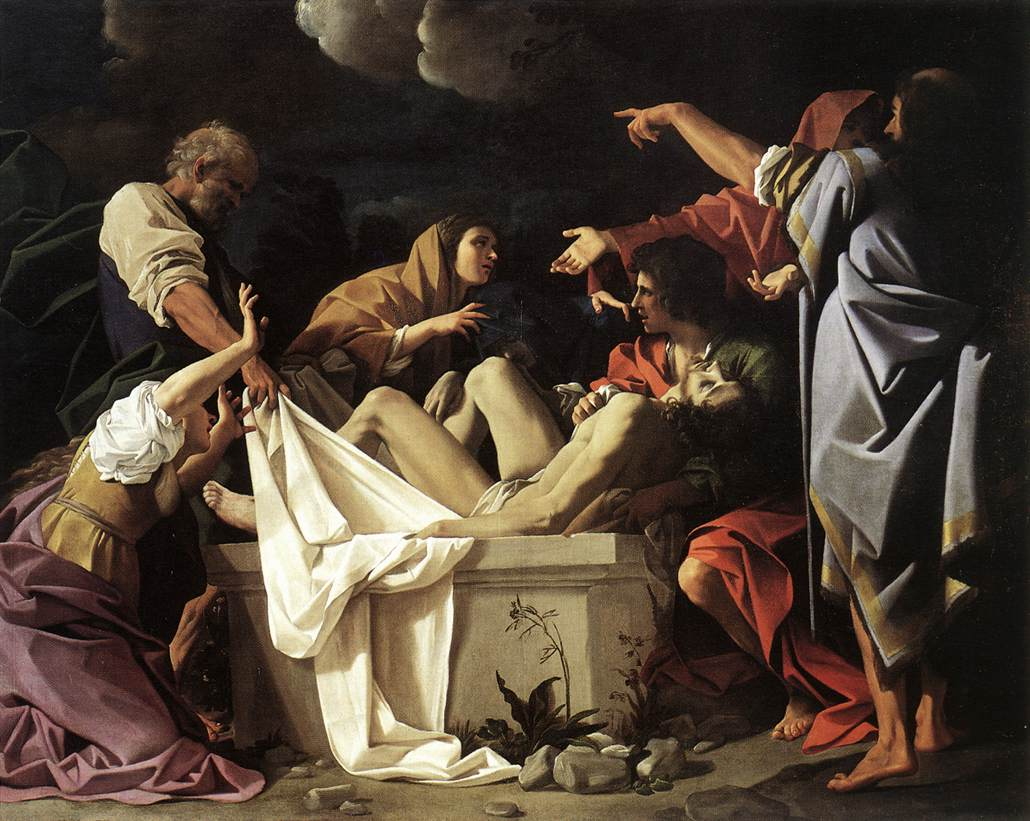
Deposition by Bartolomeo Schedoni, c. 1613

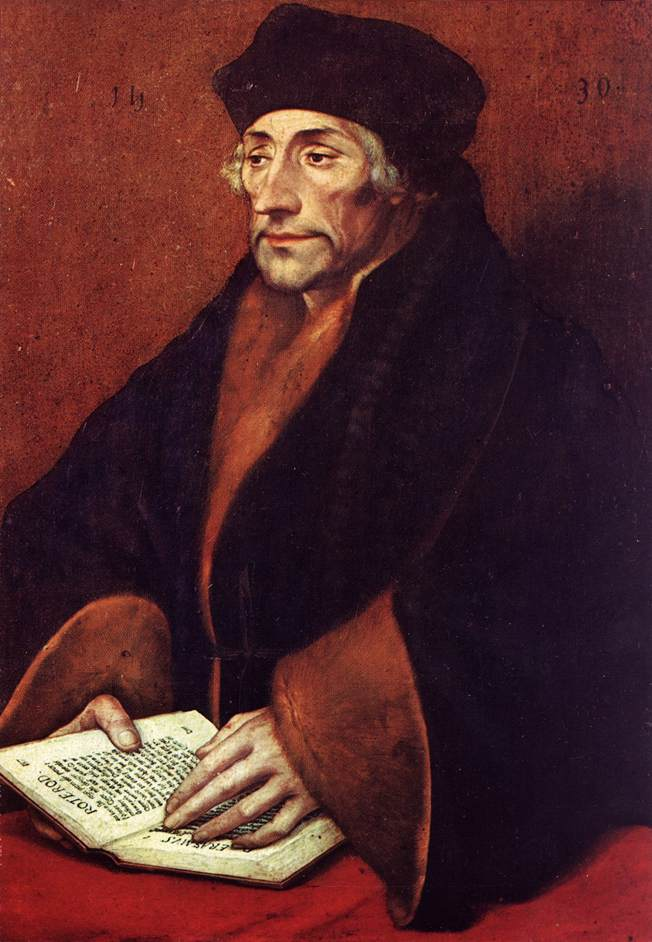
Portrait of Erasmus of Rotterdam by Hans Holbein The Younger, c. 1530

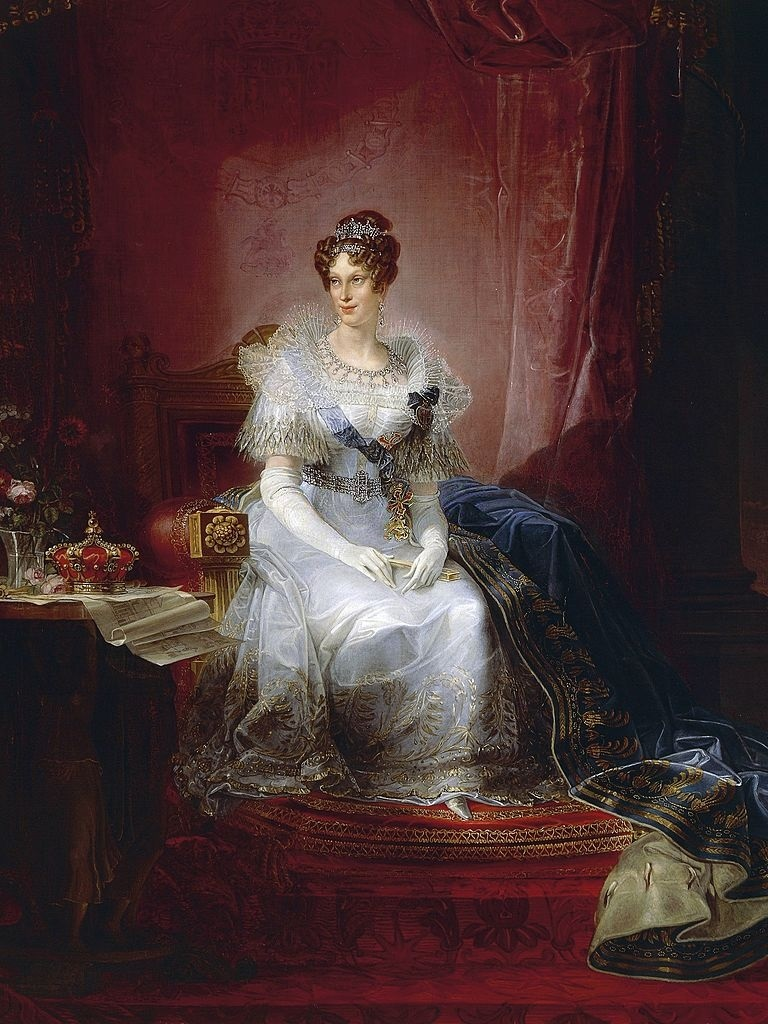
Portrait of Marie Louise by Giovanni Battista Borghesi, 1839

== See also ==
- List of national galleries
