= Alinovi =

Alinovi is an Italian surname. Notable people with the surname include:

- Abdon Alinovi (1923–2018), Italian politician
- Giuseppe Alinovi (1811–1848), Italian painter
- Simone Alinovi (born 1997), Italian gridiron and flag football player
