= Giuseppe Boccaccio =

Italian painter and scenographer

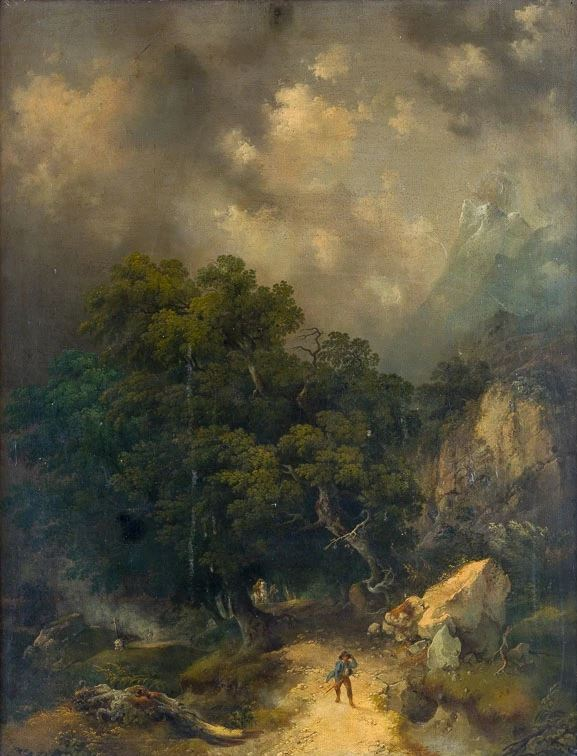
In the Apennines

Giuseppe Boccaccio (1790/91, Colorno - 5 February 1852, Parma) was an Italian painter and scenographer.

== Biography ==
His father, Girolamo Boccaccio, was a musician, associated with the opera. While still very young, Ferdinand, Duke of Parma, noticed his drawing talents and offered to help finance his studies. Ferdinand died in 1802 but, by then, he had established himself as a student, and he received support from his teacher, Claudio Salvatore Balzari. In 1814, after three years of service in the Army, he married Maddalena Guatteri. They would have two sons, who devoted themselves to musical careers. He soon became a well-known landscape painter and, in 1817, was named an honorary Academic at the Accademia di Belle Arti di Parma. For economic reasons, he also did scenographic work for several private and public theaters.

In 1819, Marie Louise, Duchess of Parma, chose him as her painting instructor and appointed him set designer for the New Ducal Theatre. For its inauguration, he created several ballet and opera sets. He also followed his patroness on her numerous travels; to Vienna, Switzerland and Germany. During this time, under his direction, she produced a series of watercolors. In 1821, he was named Professor of landscape painting at the Accademia.

His set designs were, like his paintings, primarily landscapes. His first season at the Ducal Theatre included sets for the operas, I Pretendenti Delusi (The Disappointed Pretenders), by Giuseppe Mosca, and La Gazza Ladra (The Thieving Magpie), by Gioacchino Rossini. He spent six years, from 1821 to 1827, painting the theatre's curtain. In 1825, he created some special decorations in the entry hall, for an upcoming visit by Emperor Francis II and the newly-crowned King Francis I of the Two Sicilies.

In his later years, he worked at theatres in cities throughout the region, including Piacenza, Reggio Emilia, Casalmaggiore, and Milan, at La Scala, where he created sets for Elena da Feltre by Saverio Mercadante, and Lucia di Lammermoor, by Gaetano Donizetti. He also took students, some of whom became well-known, such as Luigi Marchesi, Alberto Pasini, Giuseppe Drugman, Giacomo Giacopelli, and Giuseppe Alinovi.

Most of his free-standing works are in private collections, but some may be seen at the Galleria Nazionale di Parma and the Museo Glauco Lombardi. A street in Parma has been named after him.

== Sources ==
- Roberto Lasagni, Dizionario biografico dei Parmigiani, Vol.1, PPS Editrice, 1999 (Online)
- Tiziano Marcheselli, Le strade di Parma, Tipografia Benedettina, 1988
- Dizionario Biografico degli Italiani, Vol.10, Amalia Barigozzi Brini, Paola Ceschi Lavagetto (Eds.), Istituto dell'Enciclopedia Italiana, 1968
