= Ennemond Alexandre Petitot =

French architect

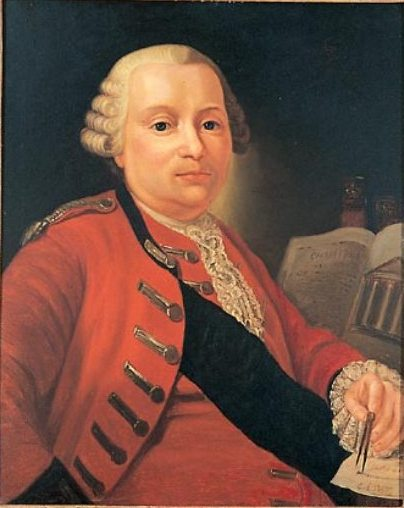
- Portrait of Ennemond Alexandre Petitot
- Born: 17 January 1727; Lyon, Kingdom of France
- Died: 3 January 1801 (aged 73); Marore, Duchy of Parma and Piacenza
- Education: Académie royale d'architecture
- Occupations: Architect; Engineer
- Movement: Neoclassicism
- Awards: Prix de Rome

Ennemond Alexandre Petitot (17 February 1727 – 3 February 1801) was a French-born architect, mainly active in the Duchy of Parma. His projects envisioning updating the Duchy along the lines of the Neoclassical style regnant in France.

== Biography ==
He was born in Lyon in 1727, and by 1741, he had joined the studio of the architect Jacques Soufflot. From there he moved to study at the Académie royale d'architecture in Paris. In 1745 he won the Prix de Rome and left Paris for a five-year stay in the eternal city. In Rome, Petitot was recruited by the prime minister Guillaume du Tillot to become the architect of the recently installed Bourbon Dukes in Parma.

=== In Parma ===
Petitot was charged with several construction projects in the duchy. In the early 1750s, he renovated the Ducal Palace of Colorno with its gardens. From 1754 he worked on the Ducal Garden of Parma, in collaboration with the French sculptor Jean Baptiste Boudard (1710-1768). In 1767, he designed the tempietto inside the park, in honor of Ferdinand of Bourbon and Maria Amalia of Habsburg-Lorraine, the new reigning couple.

=== 1760s ===
In the 1760s, Petitot was mainly occupied in transforming the appearance of Parma by redecorating the façades of various major buildings. In the Piazza Grande he worked on the façades of San Pietro Apostolo (1760–62), using a design based on the Trevi Fountain in Rome and the façade of Saint-Roch, Paris (by Jacques Lemercier, 1740), and the Governor’s Palace (1760).

In 1763–4 he redesigned the façade of the Casino dei Nobili in a 16th-century revival style filtered through French Baroque classicism. He was also active at that time in constructing one of the first examples in Italy of the French boulevard – the Stradone, which terminates at the elegant Casino del Caffè dello Stradone, designed in the style of contemporary French buildings by Ange-Jacques Gabriel and Soufflot. At the Western end of the Stradone, at the intersection with Strada Firini, he erected the Colonna Borbone (Bourbon column), a 90-foot monumental free-standing doric column topped by Bourbon coat of arms

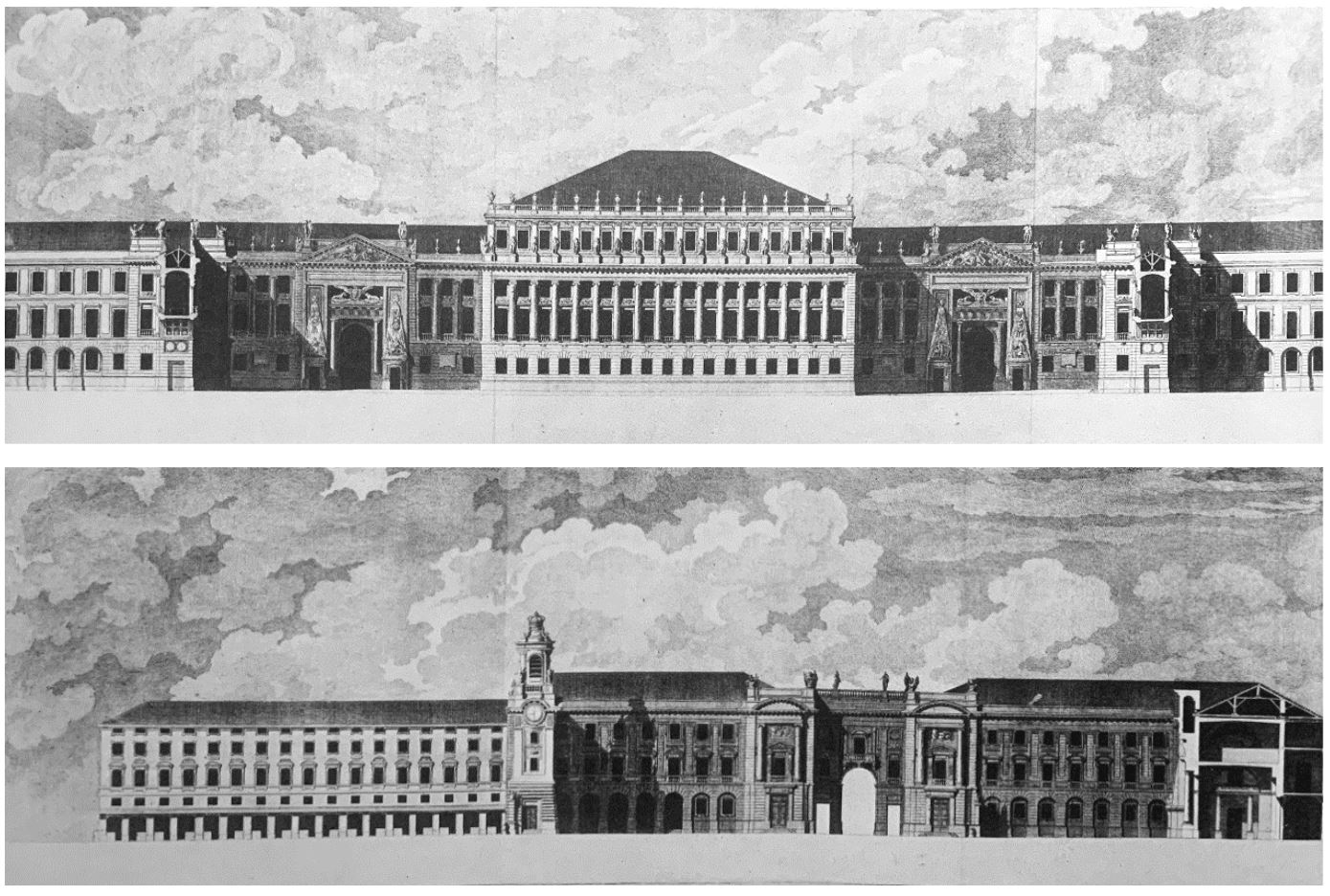
Design for the reconstruction of the Ducal Palace of Parma, started not completed

Among Petitot’s unrealized projects was one for a grandiose new Ducal Palace (1765–8), which would have completely disrupted the urban grain of one part of the city; this was abandoned through lack of funds. In collaboration with the sculptor Jean-Baptiste Boudard and the stuccoist Benigno Bossi, Petitot decorated numerous interiors, including the ducal box at the Theatre, the Salon of the Ducal Palace (1760), a few rooms in the Palazzo di Riserva (1764), the Biblioteca Palatina (1765–8) and the Palazzo del Giardino (1766).

In 1769, in the piazza in front of San Pietro, Petitot with collaboration of Jean Baptiste Boudard, completed a neoclassic monument to celebrate the visit of the Holy Roman Emperor Joseph II to Parma for the occasion of the marriage of his sister, Archduchess Maria Amalia of Austria, with the Duke Ferdinand. Titled the Ara Amicitiae (Altar of Friendship), the monument was a truncated column recalling the Ancient Roman Monument erected in Rome to celebrate the end of the wars in Germany.

He also built a number of temporary structures for court weddings and funerals. Petitot’s extraordinary inventiveness and outstanding ability as a draughtsman explain the abundant graphic production to which his name is linked: among his most important works is the Mascarade à la grecque, an ironic and refined parody of the goût grec that was popular in Paris and throughout France during the 1760s. Petitot reached the peak of his creative expression in the field of architectural and decorative design, blending elements of the Rococo with those of the new classicism to achieve a graceful formal and compositional equilibrium.

=== Fall from grace ===
When Du Tillot, his chief supporter at the court in Parma, lost favour in 1771, Petitot took refuge in the field of imaginary architecture (or was relegated to it). He still held the title of First Architect to the Duke, but his activity was limited to having a share in the Congregazione degli Edili and in the Academy of Fine Arts of Parma (he was one of the founders), where he conducted a renowned school of architecture. With the dislocations occurring Northern Italy after the French Revolution, the influence and scope of commissions for Petitot waned. He died in his villa in Marore, where he had built a small private theater (teatrino).

=== Legacy ===
Petitot's refined taste, which expressed a moment of transition between the styles of Louis XV and Louis XVI, Kings of France, placed him at the forefront of artistic culture in contemporary Italy and gave him an easy predominance over local artists. This taste later spread to all of northern Italy, partly through the influence of his pupils at the Accademia di Belle Arti.

== Select works ==
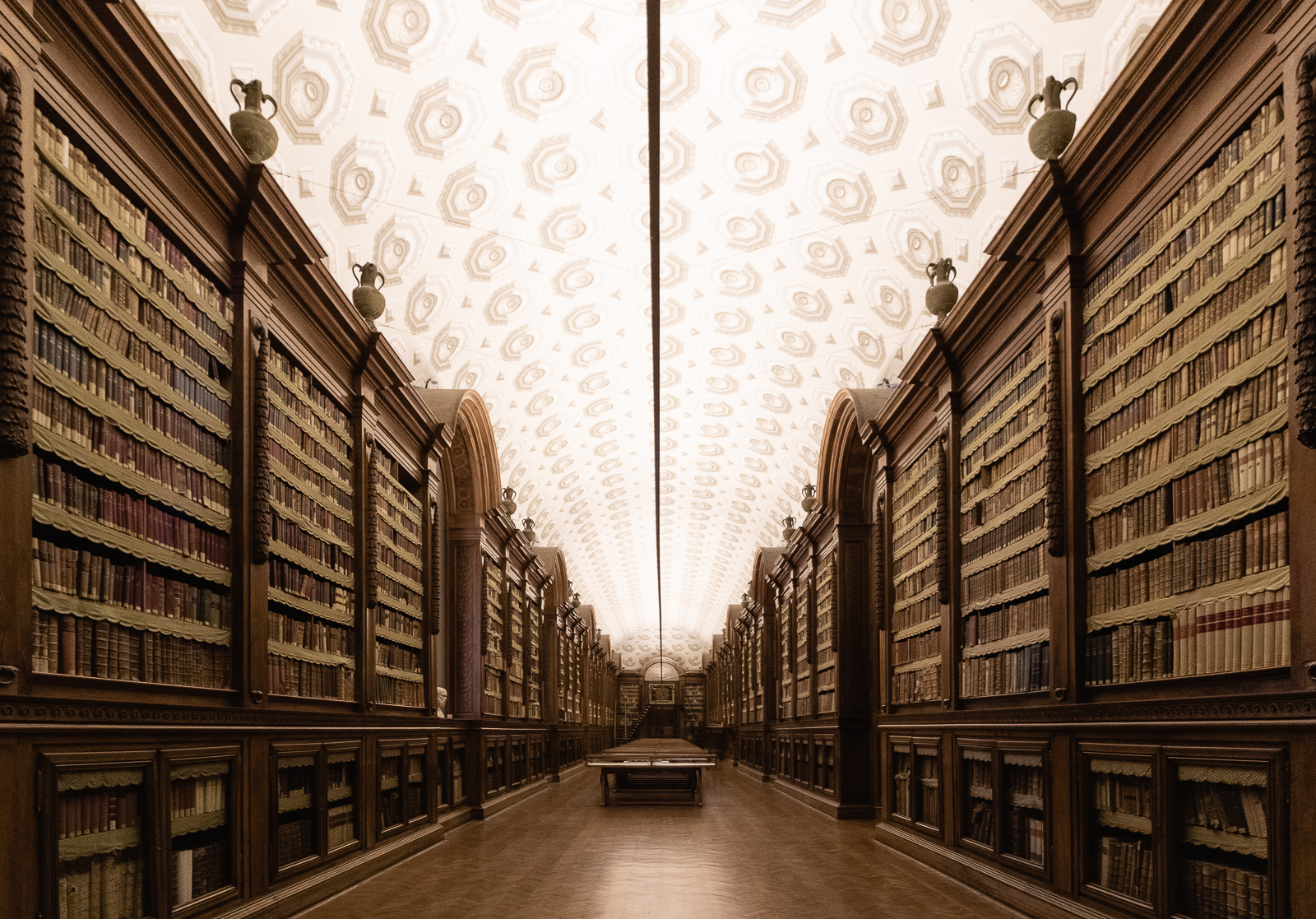
Biblioteca Palatina, Parma, 1766

- Venaria (Ducal hunting lodge) at Colorno (1753)
- Apartments and Staircase of Honour for the Ducal Palace of Colorno (1755)
- Sculptural Vases for the Ducal Garden in Parma, similar to those found in the Gardens of Versailles (1754)
- Loggia of the theater of the Ducal Palace of Parma (with Boudard; 1760)
- A design for the reconstruction of the Ducal Palace of Parma, started but not completed (1766-1769)
- Façade of the church of San Pietro (1761-1762)
- Ara Amicitiae (1769, since destroyed)
- Designs for the Biblioteca Palatina (1766)
- Temple of Arcadia in the Dukes' Gardens of Parma
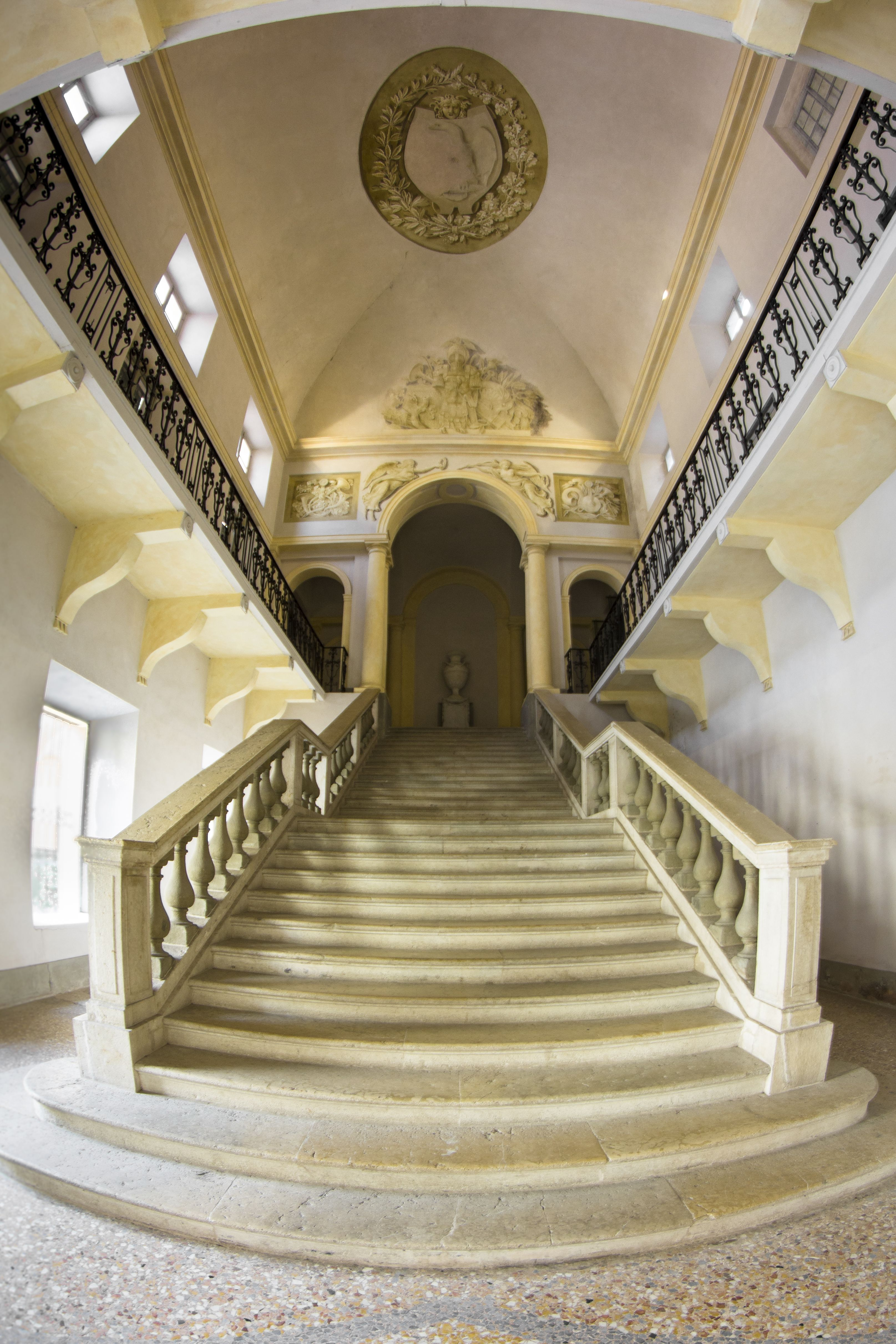
Staircase of Honour for Ducal Palace of Colorno

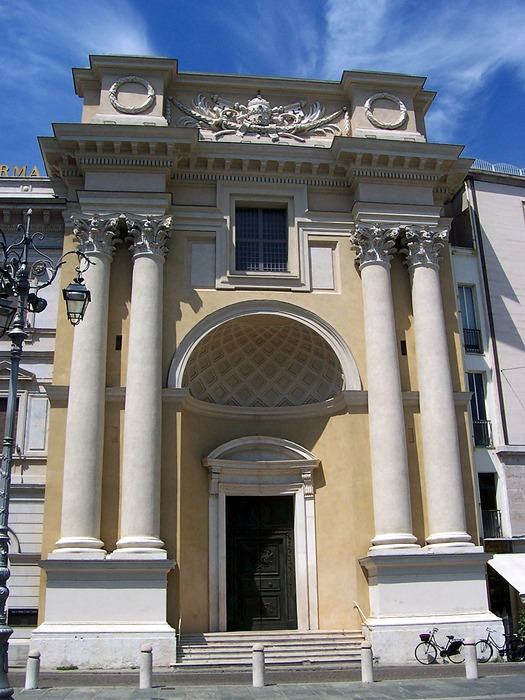
Façade of San Pietro, Parma

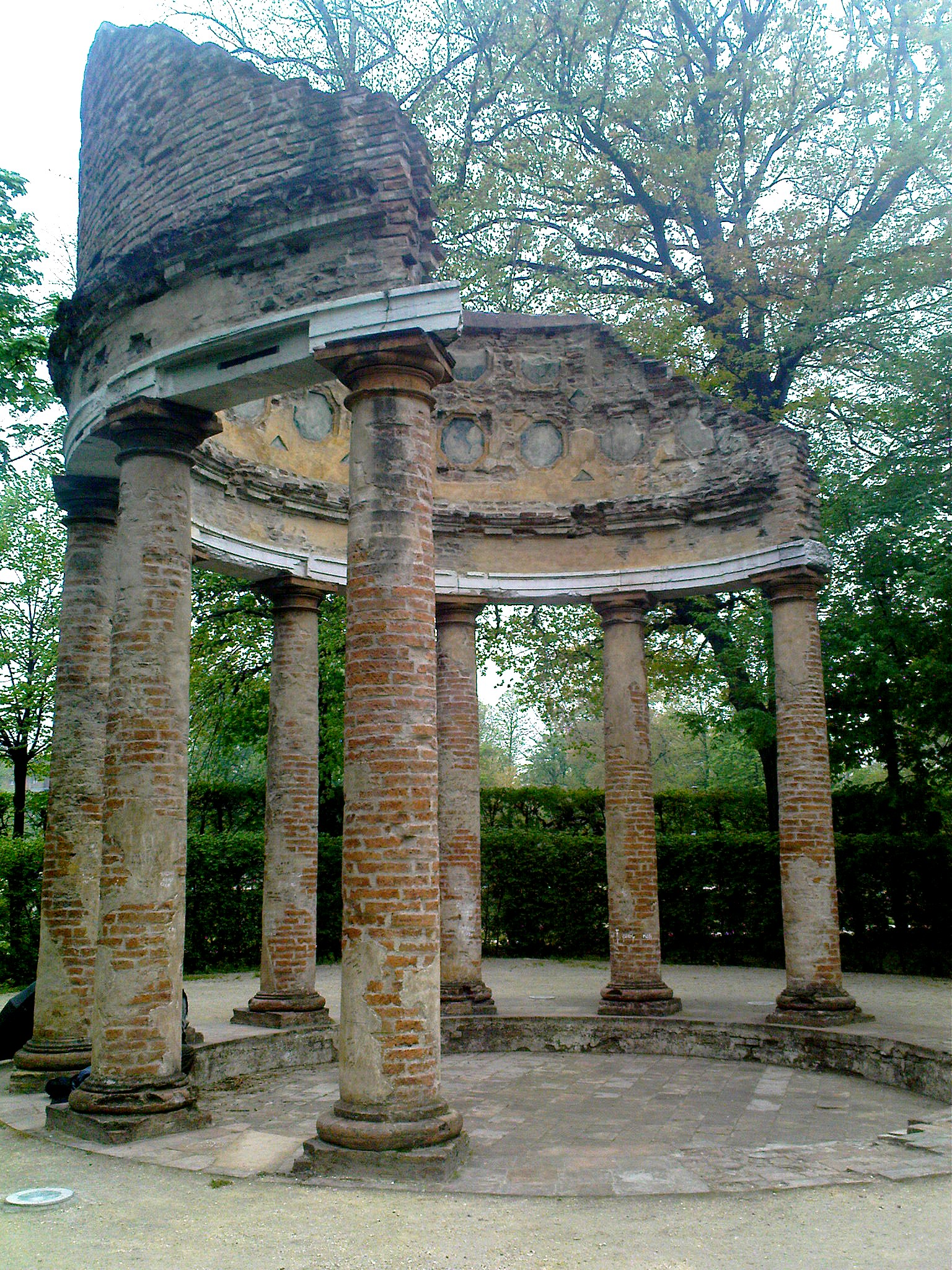
Temple of Arcadia in the Dukes'Garden in Parma.

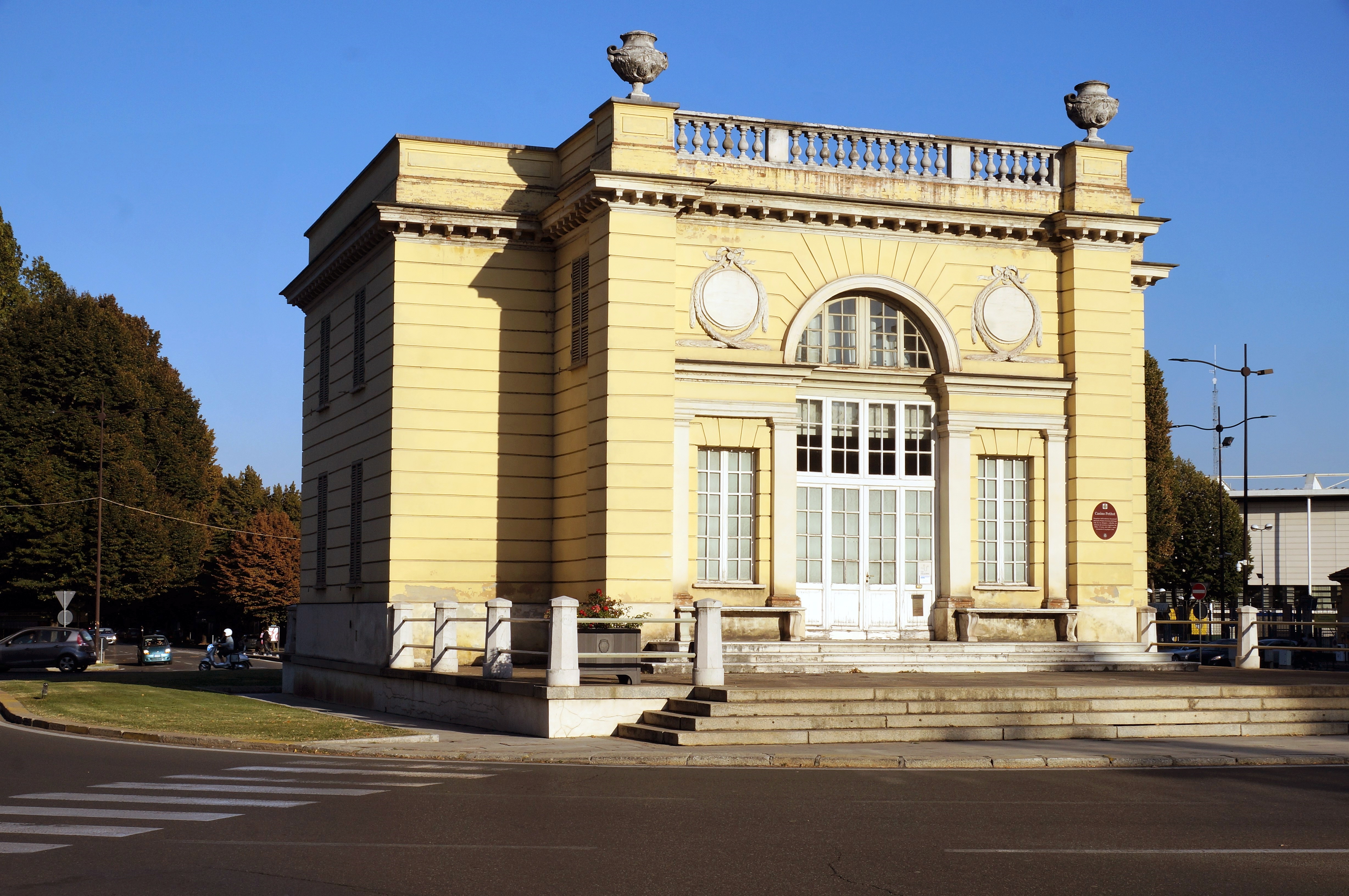
Casinetto Petitot

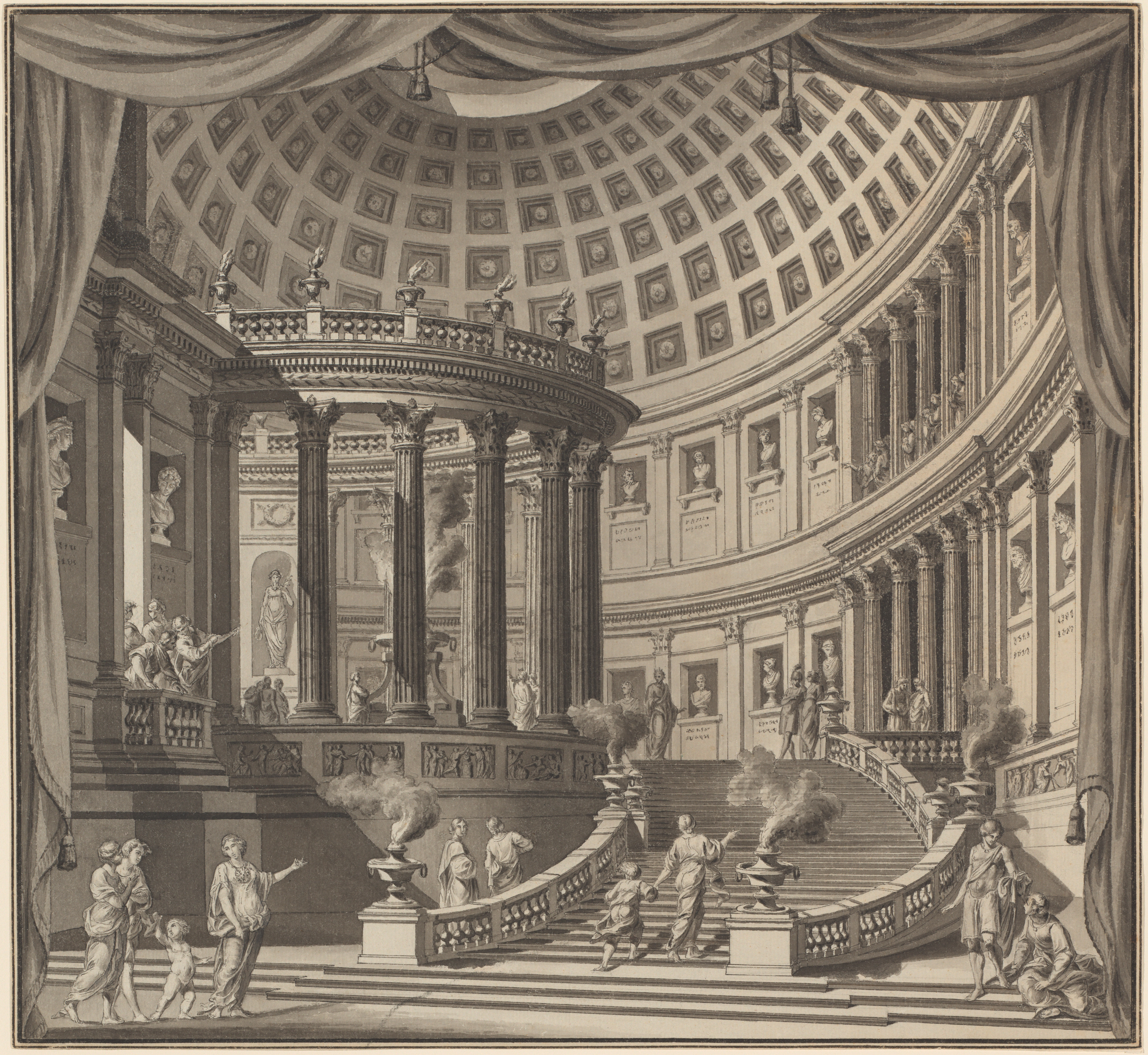
Design for a Stage Curtain

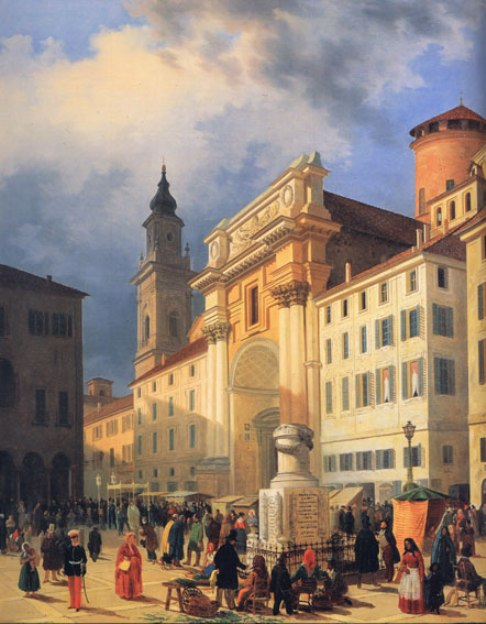
The Ara Amicitiae in Parma's Piazza grande in a painting by Luigi Marchesi (1852)
