= Ducal Palace of Parma =

Former ducal palace of Parma, residence of Marie Louise of Habsburg

Coordinates: 44°48′15″N 10°19′37″E

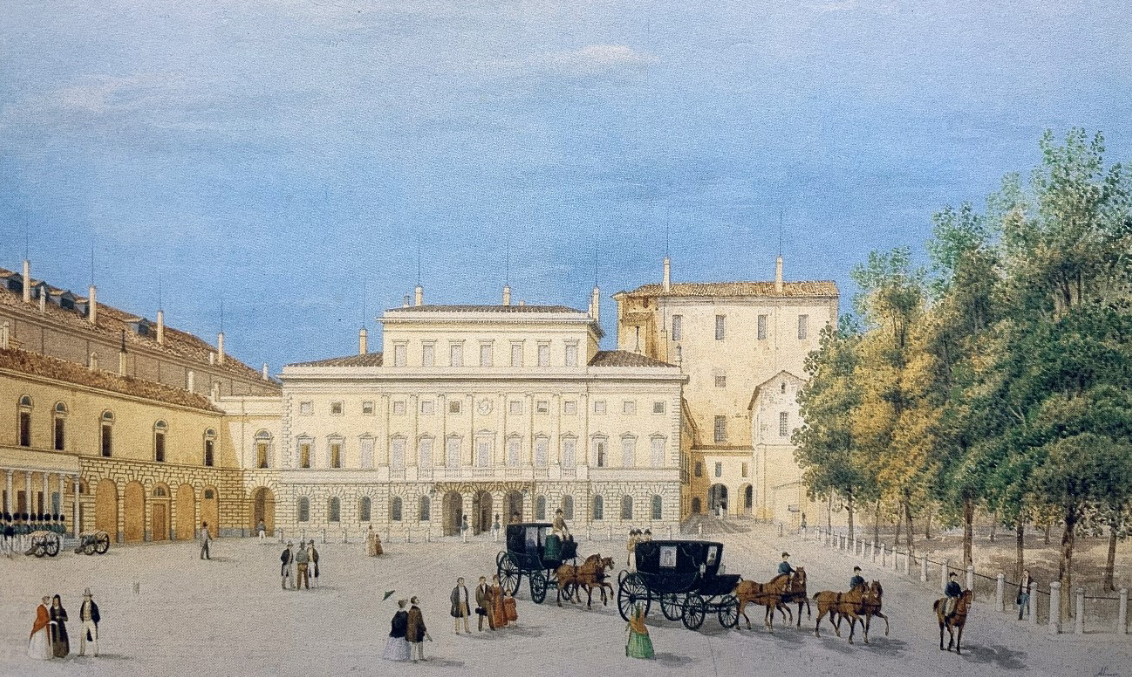
The ducal palace by Giuseppe Alinovi (1811–1848) with the Palazzo della Pilotta in the back and on the left the corridor which connected the palace to opposite facing Palazzo di Riserva

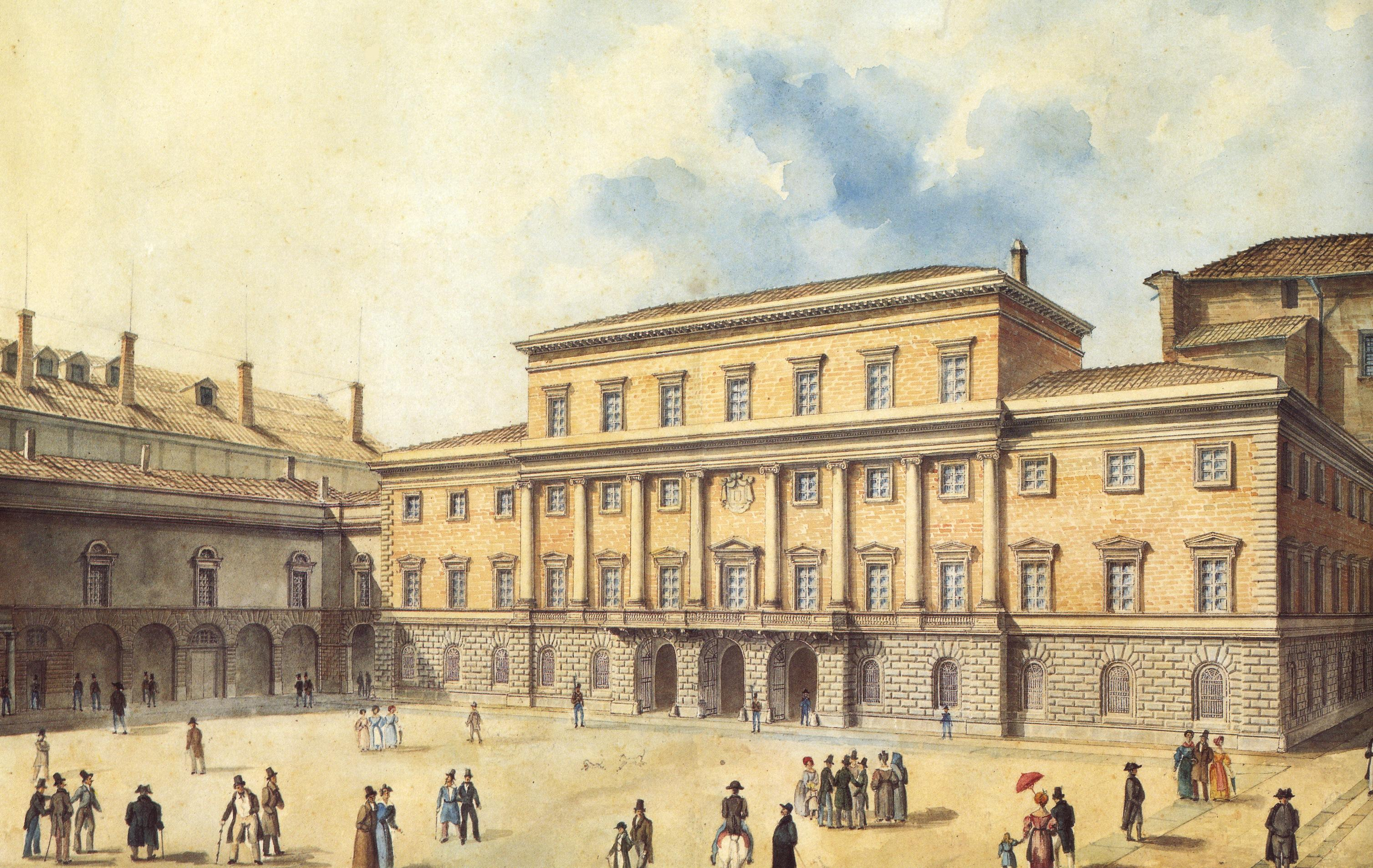
The ducal palace by Giacomo Giacopelli (1808–1893)

The Ducal Palace of Parma (Italian: Palazzo Ducale di Parma) was a neoclassical palace in Parma, Italy. It was located on the west side of the Piazzale della Pace. Between its construction and 1859, it was the residence of the Dukes of Parma. After 1859, it became the prefecture.

Throughout its history, the palace was not a single building but a collection of privately acquired properties gradually embellished by the dukes, which never formed a homogeneous ensemble. Instead, they represented a grouping of diverse and unfinished projects.

One notable element associated with the Ducal Palace is the Palazzo della Pilotta, which was part of the complex. This compound housed a series of buildings and structures used for various purposes, including a library, theater, art gallery, and other cultural spaces.

During the Second World War, the residential core suffered severe damage during air raids in 1944, and it was not reconstructed afterwards. In its place, a large empty and landscaped space known as Piazza della Pace was established, which serves as public space and also as a reminder of the turbulent events that occurred during the war. Although the loss of the residential core of the Ducal Palace was a tragedy for the city's historical heritage, the presence of the Piazza della Pace symbolizes the post-war rebirth and reconstruction.

== History ==
=== Duke Ottavio Farnese - The beginning ===
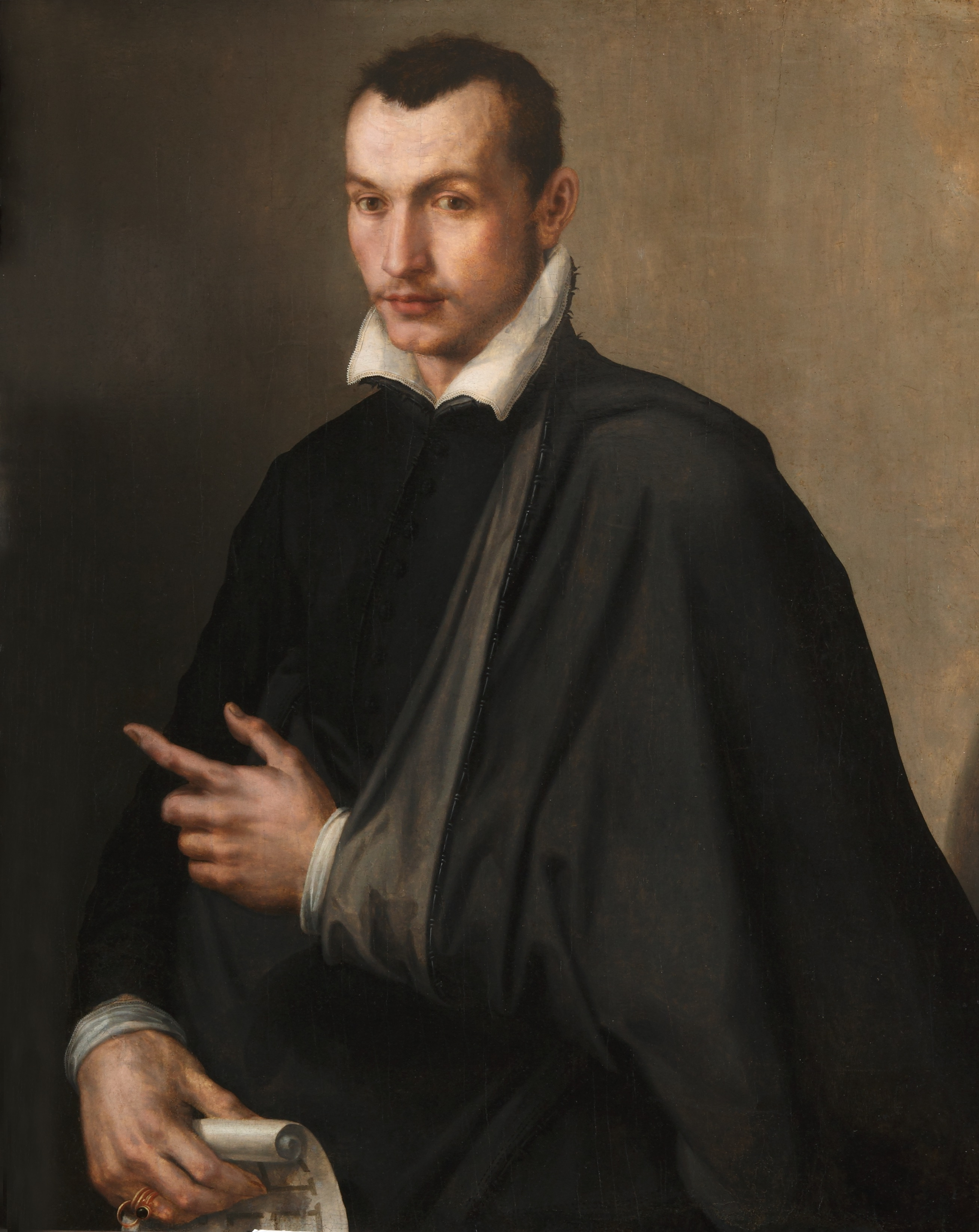
Duke Ottavio I

Development of the corridor between the ducal palace and the Rochetta Viscontea into the Palazzo della Pilotta

In 1545, Pope Paul III created the hereditary Duchy of Parma for his natural son, Pier Luigi Farnese (1503–1547). It was held by the House of Farnese until 1731, when the last Farnese duke, Antonio Farnese, died without a male heir. Initially, Piacenza was the capital of the duchy. But, Pier Luigi's son, Ottavio Farnese (1524–1586) moved the capital to Parma. Unlike, the monumental residence in Piacenza, the Palazzo Farnese, the ducal palace in Parma was modest. Background was the empty ducal treasury, due to economic conditions and the many wars that ravaged northern Italy in the second half of the 16th century. The palace was only a set of neighbouring houses, along the current Strada Garibaldi, which were acquired for temporarily use by the ducal court. In addition, across the Parma river, Ottavio transformed an ancient Visconti fortress into a summer residence surrounded by gardens, the current Palazzo del Giardino.

In 1580, Ottavio decided to connect his Parmesan palaces by building a large corridor that connected the ducal palace with the 'Rocchetta Viscontea', a keep of which traces can be seen next to the Parma river. He probably involved the architect, Francesco Paciotto, to do the design. The project echoed the idea, never realized, of connecting the two Farnese residences in Rome via a bridge: the Palazzo Farnese and the Villa Farnesina. It can also be compared to the Vasari Corridor in Florence, which connected the Palazzo Vecchio with the Palazzo Pitti, allowing safe passage for the Medici grand dukes of Tuscany. Construction of the corridor started in 1581, but was halted in 1586, when Ottavio passed away. Fragments have been preserved in the south side of Pilotta courtyard. Over the next fifty years, additional buildings and courtyards were added to the corridor. This complex is now known as the Palazzo della Pilotta.

Alexander Farnese, Duke of Parma (1545–1592), showed less interest in continuing the works on the ducal palace, as he mostly stayed in Brussels, being Governor of the Spanish Netherlands.

=== Duke Ranuccio I Farnese - The Pilotta palace ===
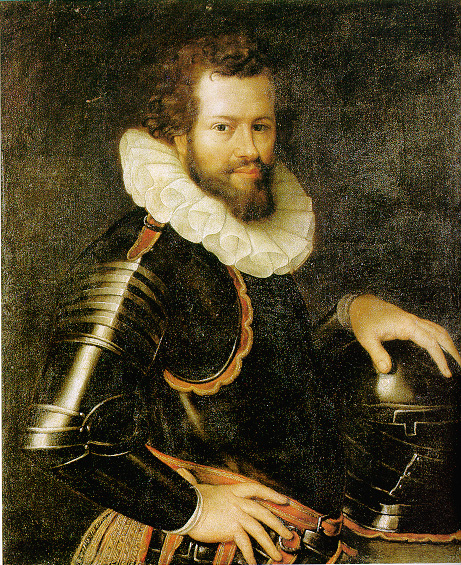
Duke Ranuccio I

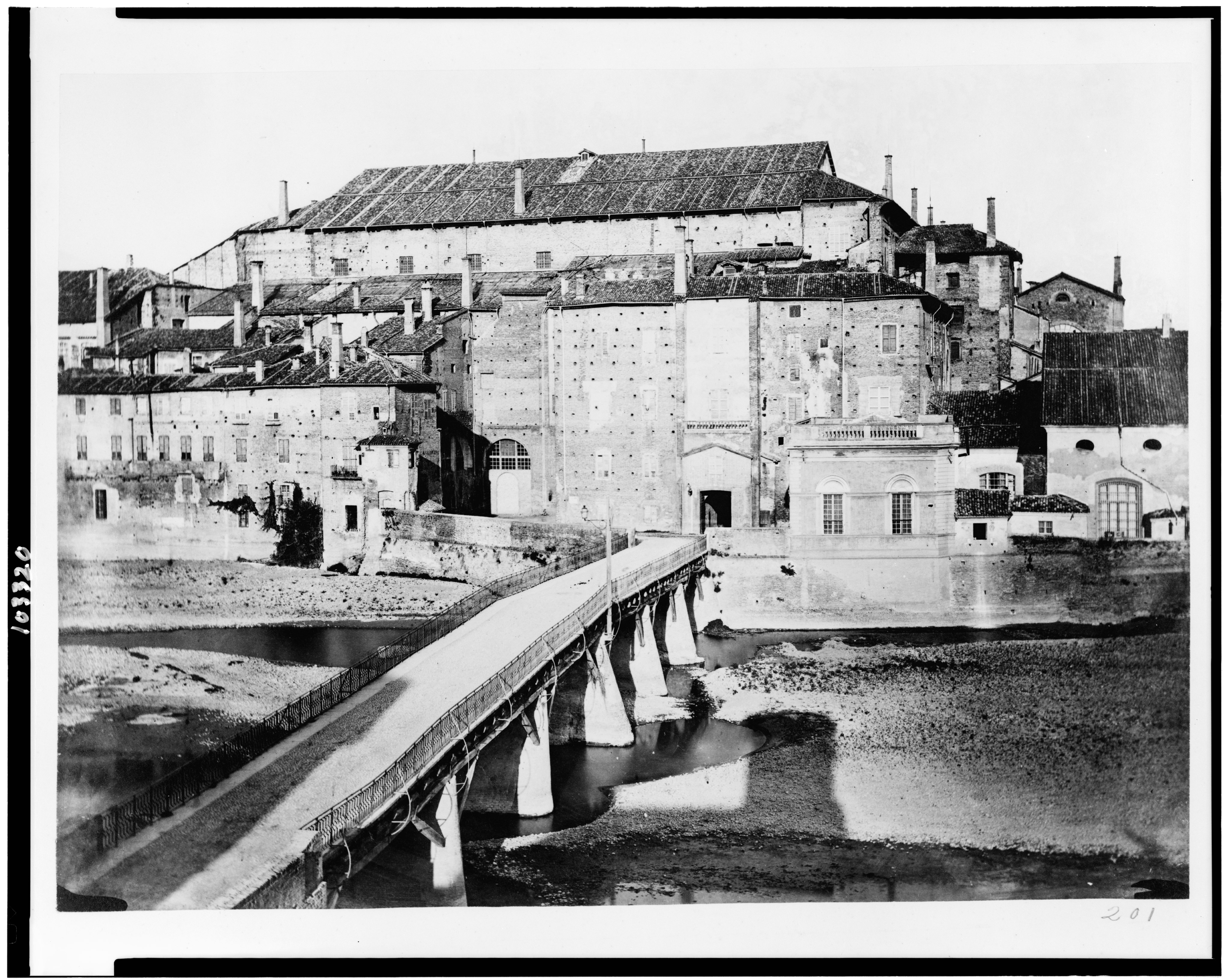
The Pilotta Palace seen from the Parma river in the 19th century

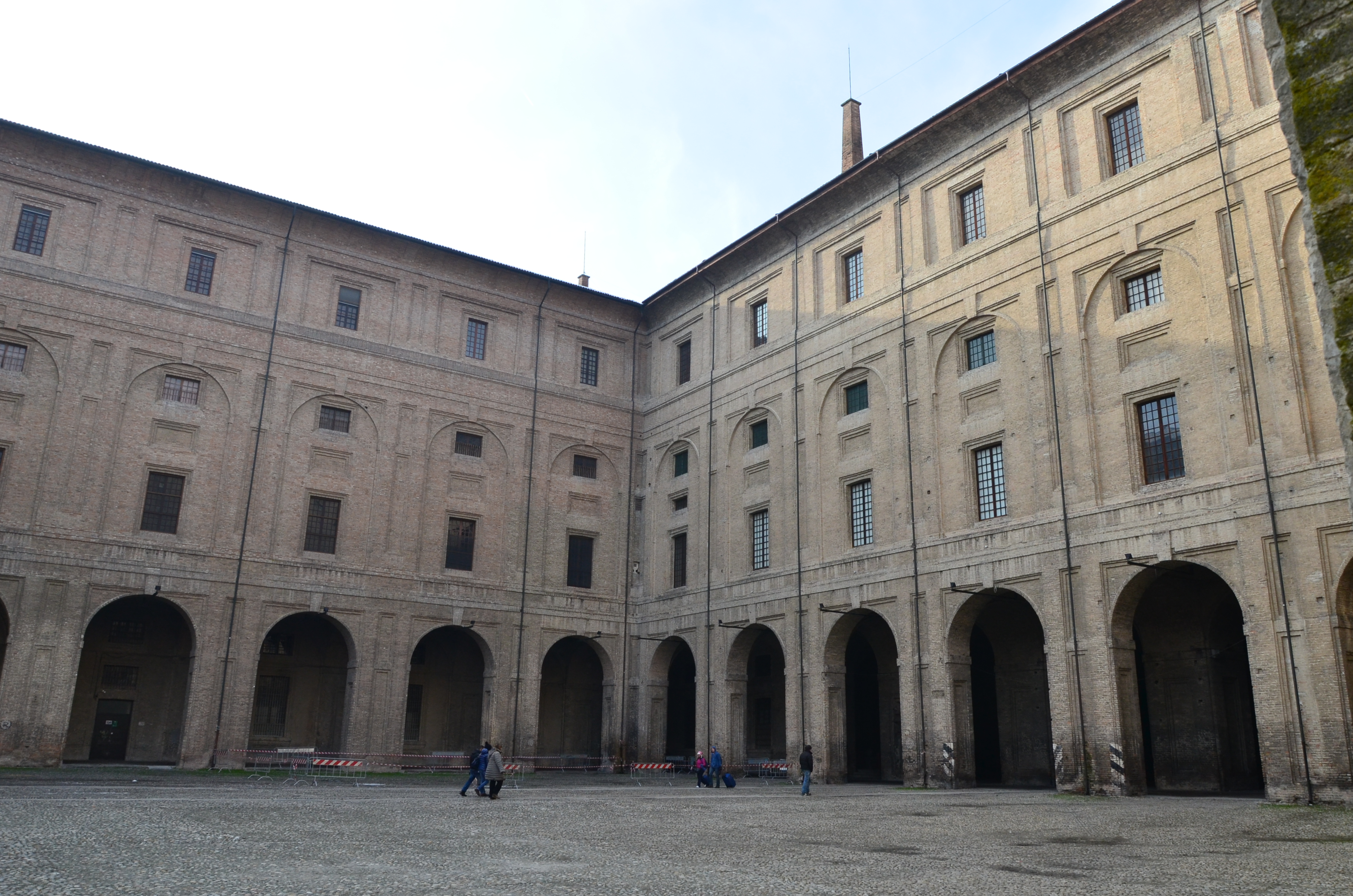
The courtyard of the Pilotta palace

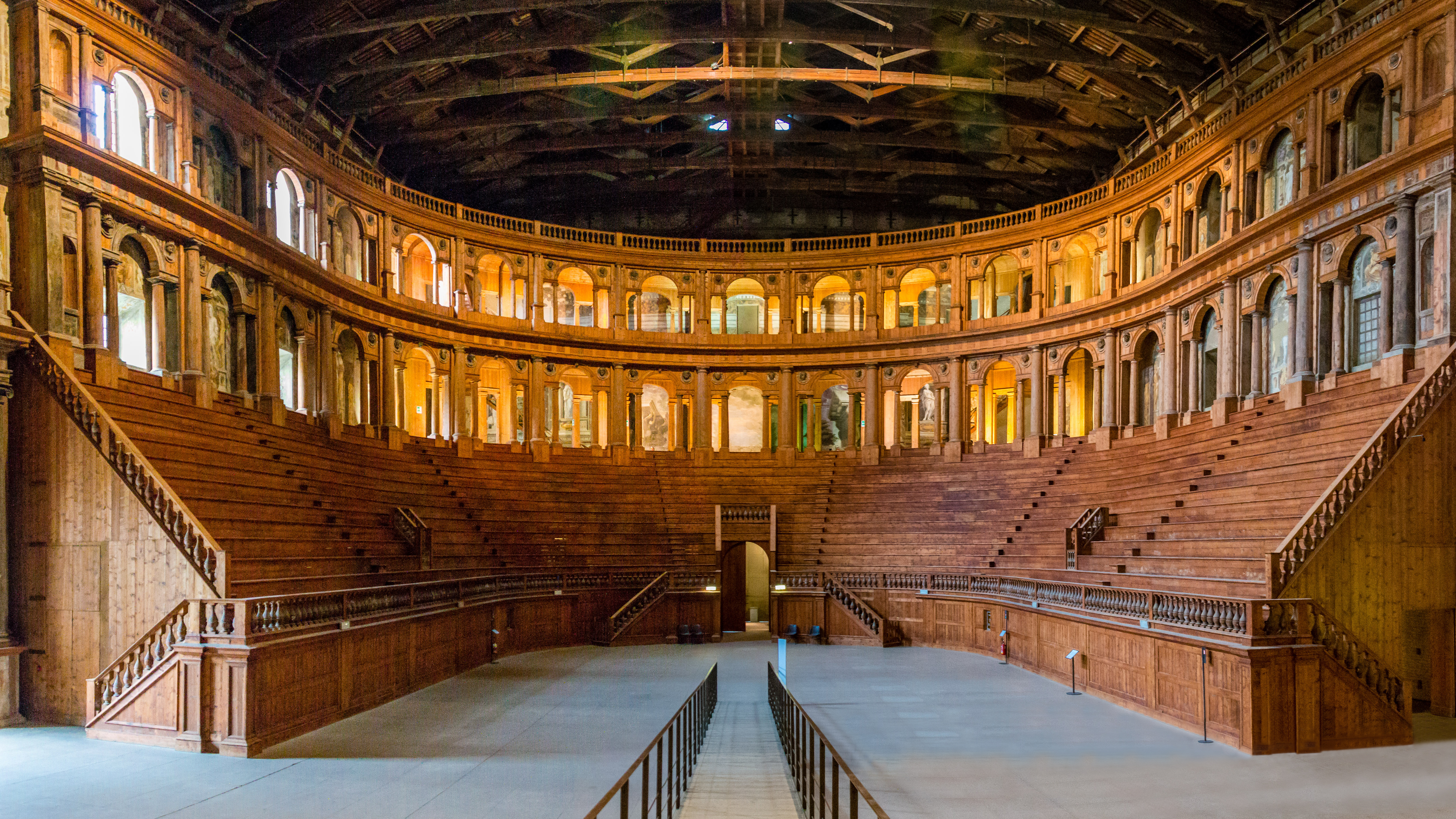
The Teatro Farnese

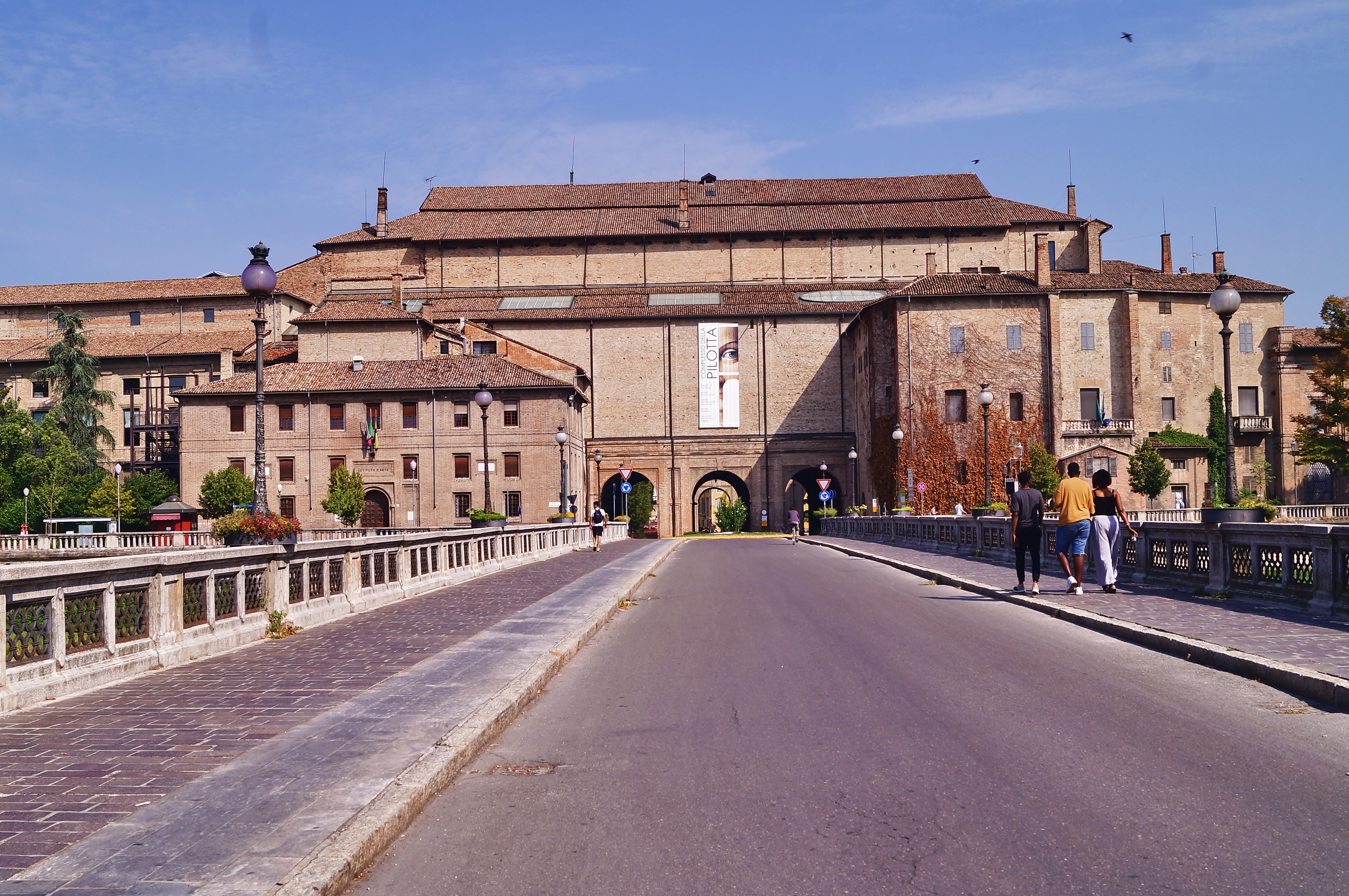
The Pilotta Palace seen from the Parma river in 2018

At the start of the 17th century, Duke Ranuccio I Farnese (1569–1622) decided to reconstruct the set of houses into a new ducal palace. Connected with the Palazzo della Pilotta, this became a large residential complex. It became subject to various renovations. It was inspired by the palace-monastery of El Escorial, with its orthogonal arrangement through courtyards, its monumental scale, and its "unadorned style". It demonstrated the growing power and prestige of the Farnese family.

The architect Simone Moschino (1553–1610) was responsible for the project, although with the significant contribution of Duke Ranuccio I himself. The Palazzo della Pilotta was essentially intended to be a "services palace", that is, it would contain various services linked to the ducal court. This would simultaneously relieve and dignify the old ducal palace located a little further east. The complex included a large banquet hall, a monumental staircase, stables, coach houses, wardrobes, and numerous accommodations for the household staff, all connected through various galleries and courtyards. This set-up was again inspired by El Escorial. Similarly, the imperial staircase of the Spanish building also served as inspiration for the one in the Parmesan palace.

The first campaign of works was carried out between 1602 and 1611 and included the southern courtyard of the complex, now the Pilotta courtyard, built around Duke Octavio's corridor. Only the eastern area, adjacent to the ducal palace and the church of San Pietro Martire, remained unfinished.

The second campaign started in 1617, with the transformation of the large hall of the west wing into the Farnese Theater, which forced the relocation of various services, such as the stables, which was rebuilt further north. The third campaign began in 1620, with the works on the southwest facade facing the Ghiaia, which remained incomplete due to the Duke's death in 1622. In the last two campaigns, the Duke's collaborating architect was Pier Francesco Battistelli.

=== The last Farneses - Shifting attention ===
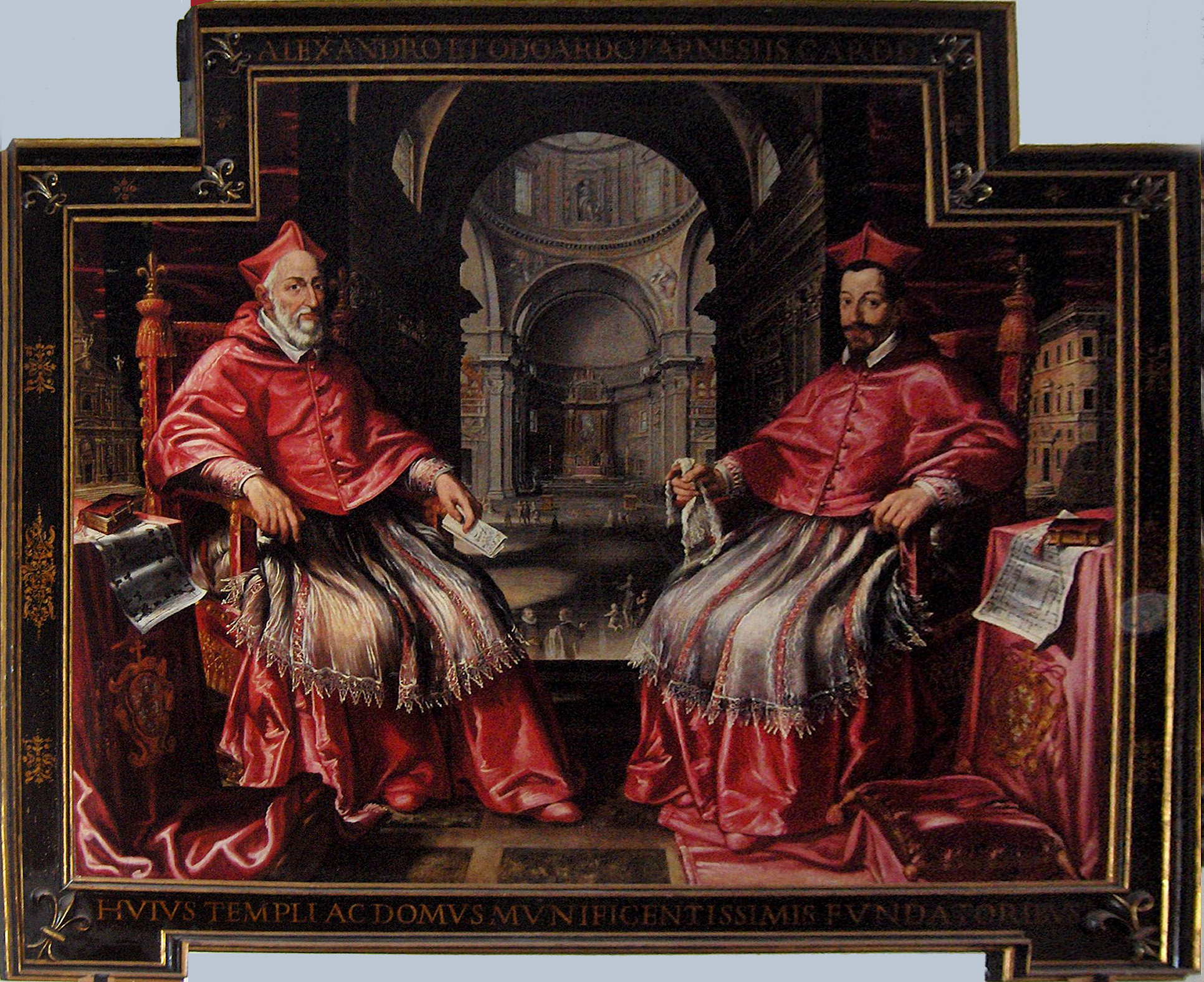
Cardinals Alessandro and Odoardo Farnese

In 1622, Cardinal-Regent Odoardo Farnese (1573–1626) appointed the Roman architect Girolamo Rainaldi (1570–1655) as the new court architect. His first objective was to complete the Pilotta with a grand Baroque façade to the east, topped by a very tall central tower. However, nothing was ultimately achieved, leaving the Palazzo della Pilotta as a large unfinished building, the result of contradictory projects, which was never inhabited by the ducal family and was destined for ancillary services.

The last dukes of the Farnese house also failed to remove the Dominican monks from the monastery of San Pietro Martire, which was supposed to be demolished for the continuation of the works. Also, they shifted their building activities to the Ducal Palace of Colorno and the Rocca Sanvitale, Sala Baganza.

Transformations in the Pilotta and the ducal palace focused mainly on the interior, adapting the spaces for ceremonial and daily life and to display the art collection and library of the Farnese.

After the death of the last duke, Antonio Farnese, in 1731, the duchy was inherited by the Infante Charles of Spain (1716-1788), son of Spanish Queen Elisabeth Farnese (1692–1766). Becoming the king of Naples in 1734, Charles ordered the transfer of the fabulous collections of the Farnese to Naples between 1735 and 1738. They are currently exhibited in the Museo di Capodimonte and in the National Archaeological Museum.

=== The Bourbon dukes of Parma - Unrealized dreams ===
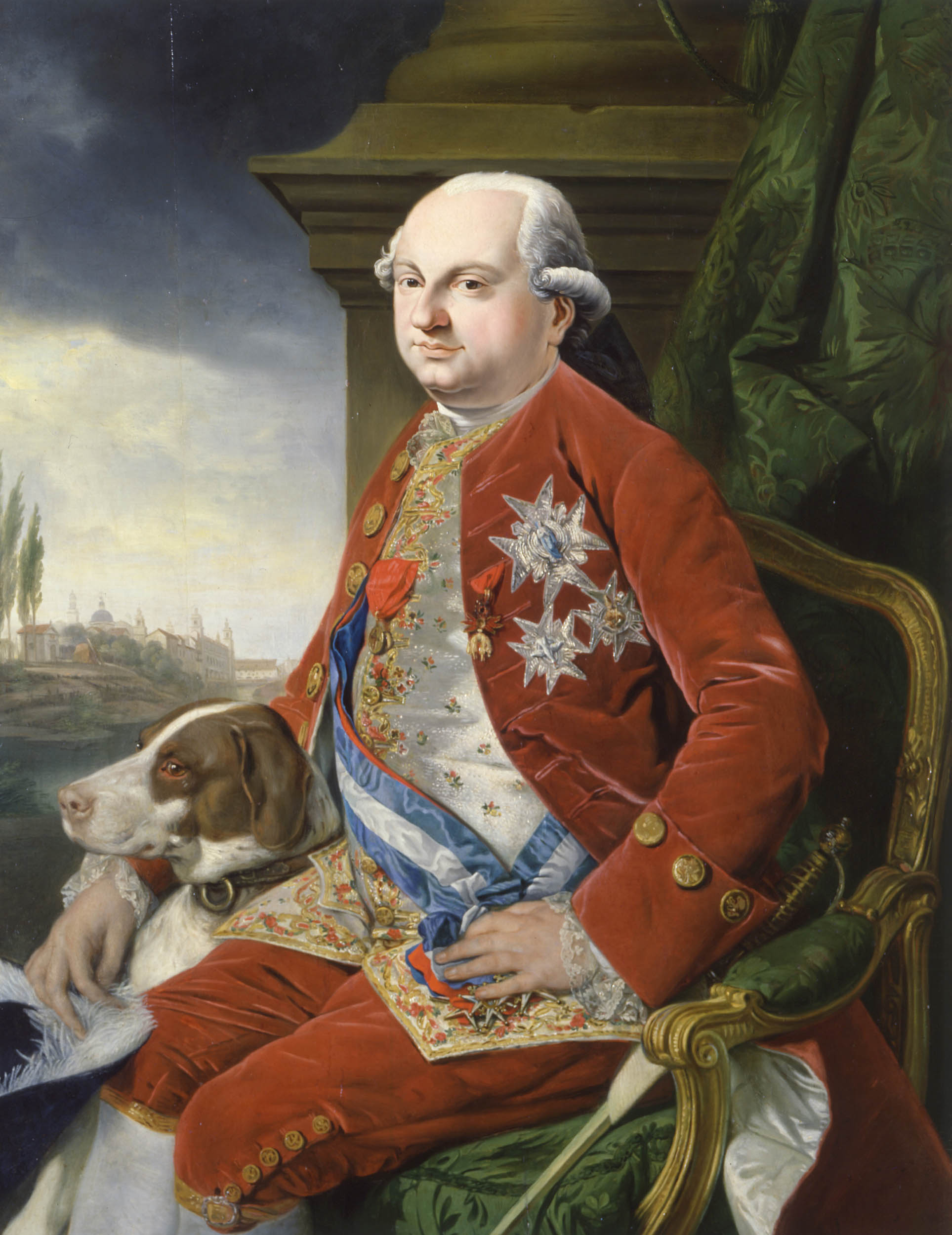
Duke Ferdinand I with the Colorno palace in the back

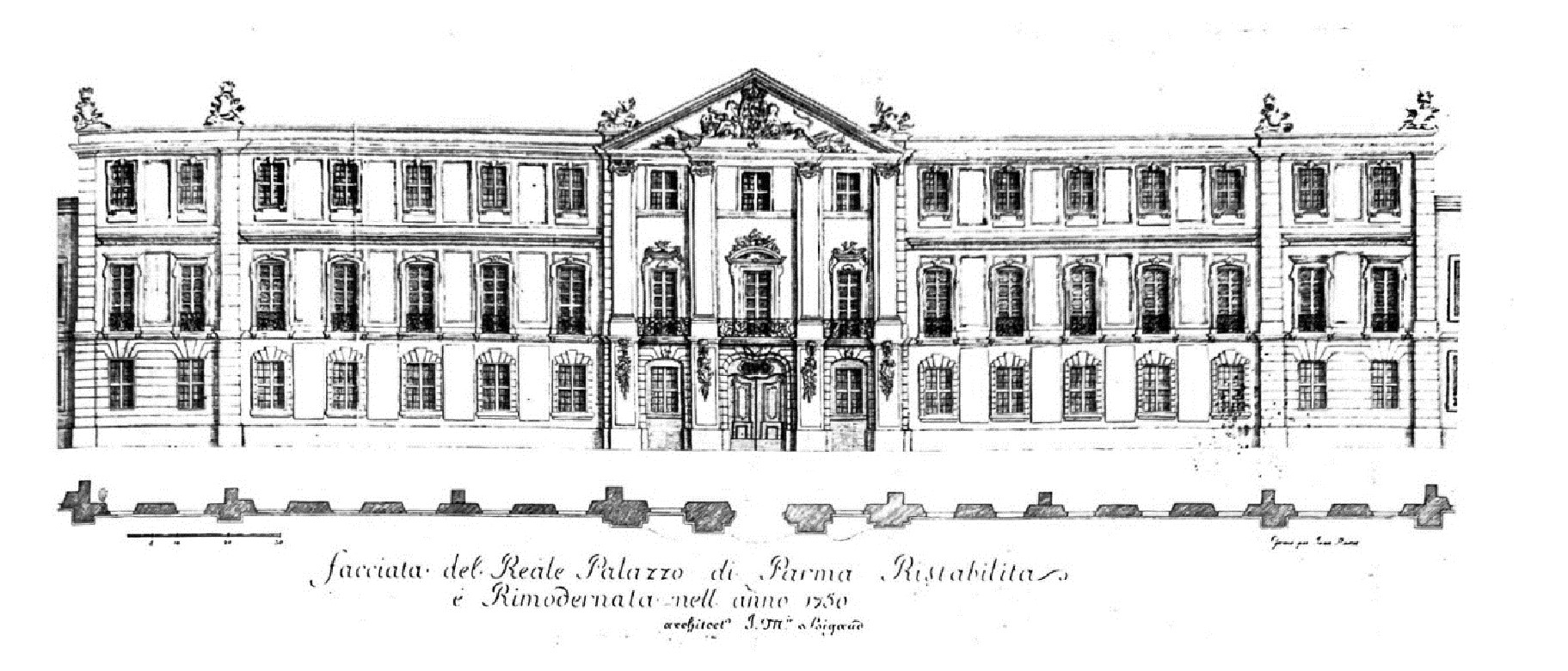
The 1750s rococo facade by Jean Marie Bigaud

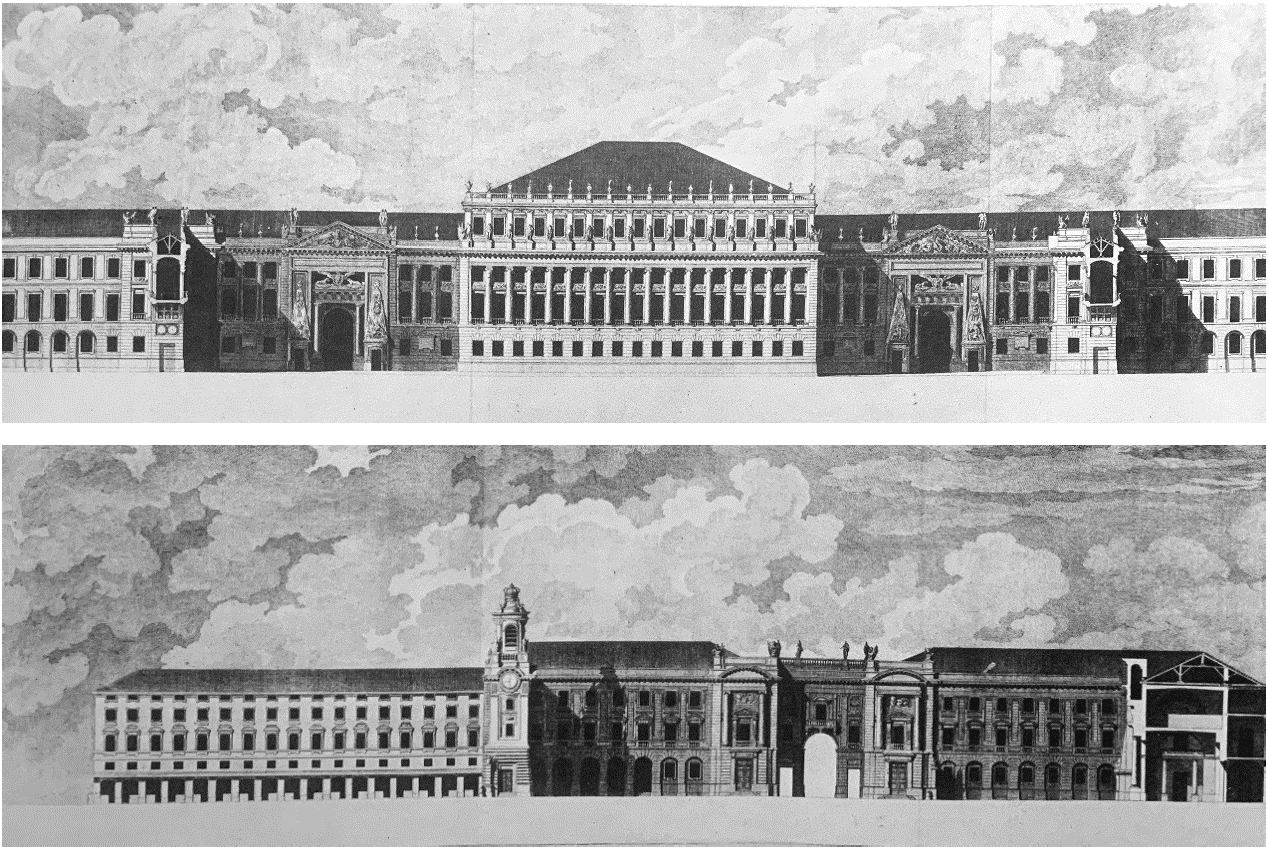
Design for a new ducal palace by Petitot

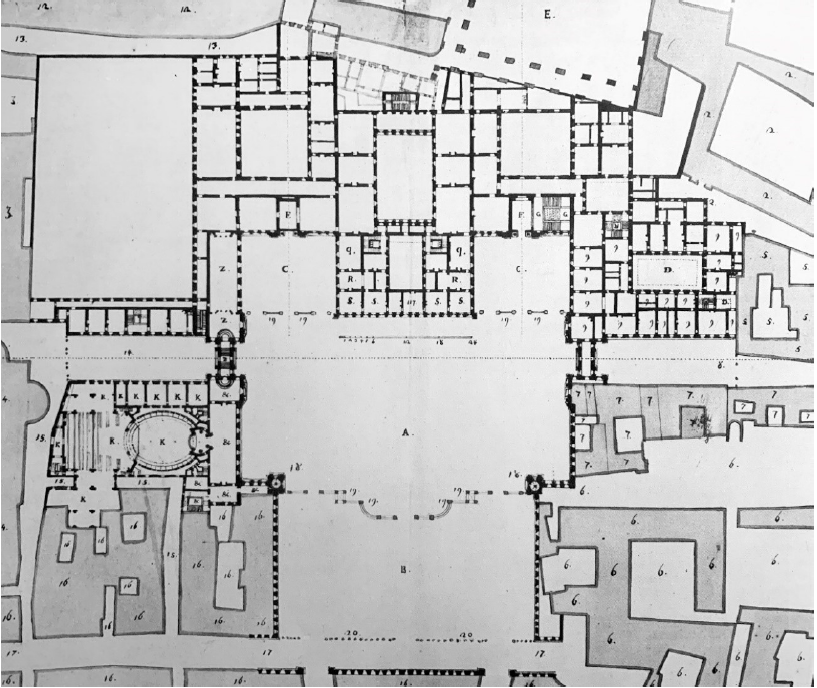
Petitot's project to reconstruct the ducal palace

After an interlude of more than ten years, during which Parma was under the rule of the House of Habsburg, in 1748 the duchy regained its independence with the Treaty of Aix-la-Chapelle, and Infante Philip (1720–1765), another son of Elisabeth Farnese, became the new duke. He primarily focused on embellishing the ducal palace of Colorno, but in 1750, Duke Philip commissioned a new northern façade for the ducal palace. This rococo façade was the work of Antoine Carlier and Jean Marie Bigoeud. This intervention was to be overshadowed by the projects of the following decade.

Duke Ferdinand I (1751–1802) considered the ducal palace too modest. And promoted by his chief minister Guillaume du Tillot, he commissioned the architect Ennemond Alexandre Petitot to design a new palace. Petitot created a grandiose plan, a new ducal residence (or "Royal Palace" as referenced in the documents) with a grand cour d'honneur and frontal square. Facing the rococo decoration developed by Petitot inside the palace, the east façade showed a classical severity, especially in the central body, clearly influenced by the Palazzo Chiericati built by Andrea Palladio in Vicenza. The lateral wings, on the other hand, served to regularize the square and conceal the heterogeneous buildings behind them. On the other hand, the grand square, inspired by the French royal squares, would extend to the present-day Strada Cavour, surpassing in size the other two squares of the city, the Piazza Grande and the Piazza del Duomo, symbolizing the preeminence of the sovereign over municipal and religious power, respectively.

However, Petitot's plan first required the demolition of numerous buildings between the Palazzo della Pilotta and the current Garibaldi road, including half of the old ducal palace and the new 1750s façade. These massive demolitions happened in 1766. However, financial difficulties prevented the completion of the monumental plans. And the duke and his wife lost interest in the Parmesan palaces, therefore, a large void remained and only the palace interiors were renovated.

In 1801, Napoleon incorporated the Duchy of Parma into France. Nothing much happened to the ducal palace, except for the demolition of the Dominican church and convent of San Pietro Martire in 1813, which had been one of the main obstacles to the realization of many architectural projects in the past.

=== Marie Louise of Habsburg - The neoclassical palace ===
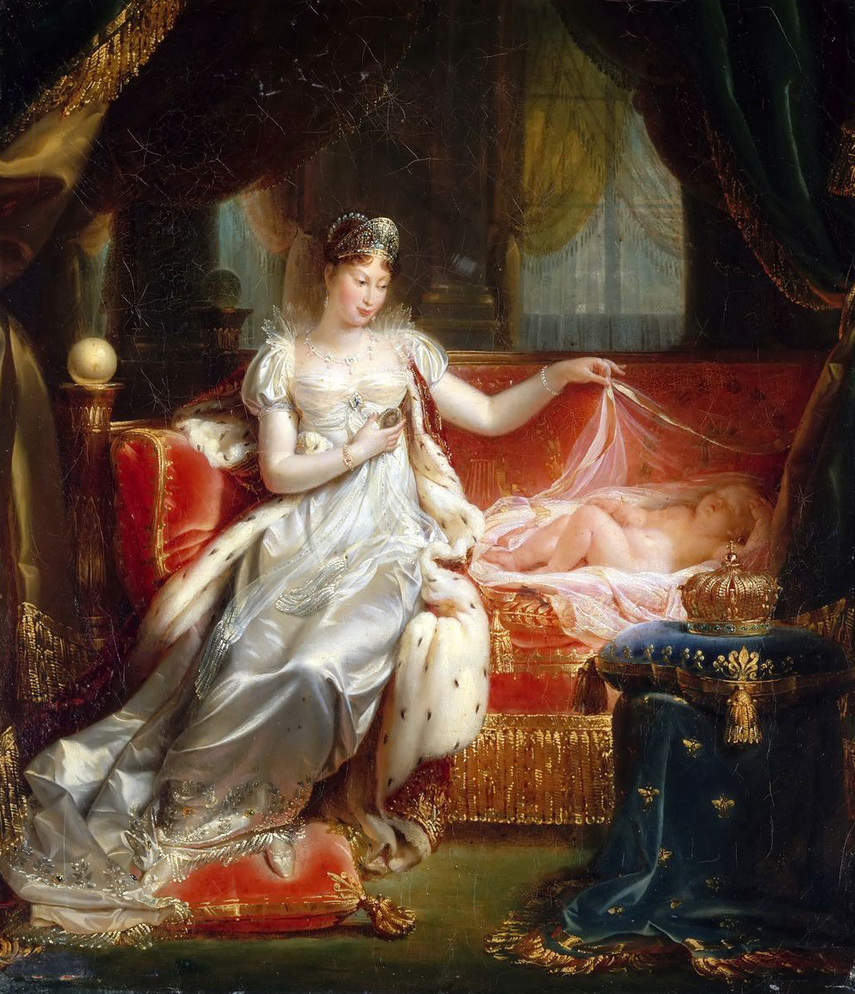
Marie Louise with the King of Rome by Joseph Franque

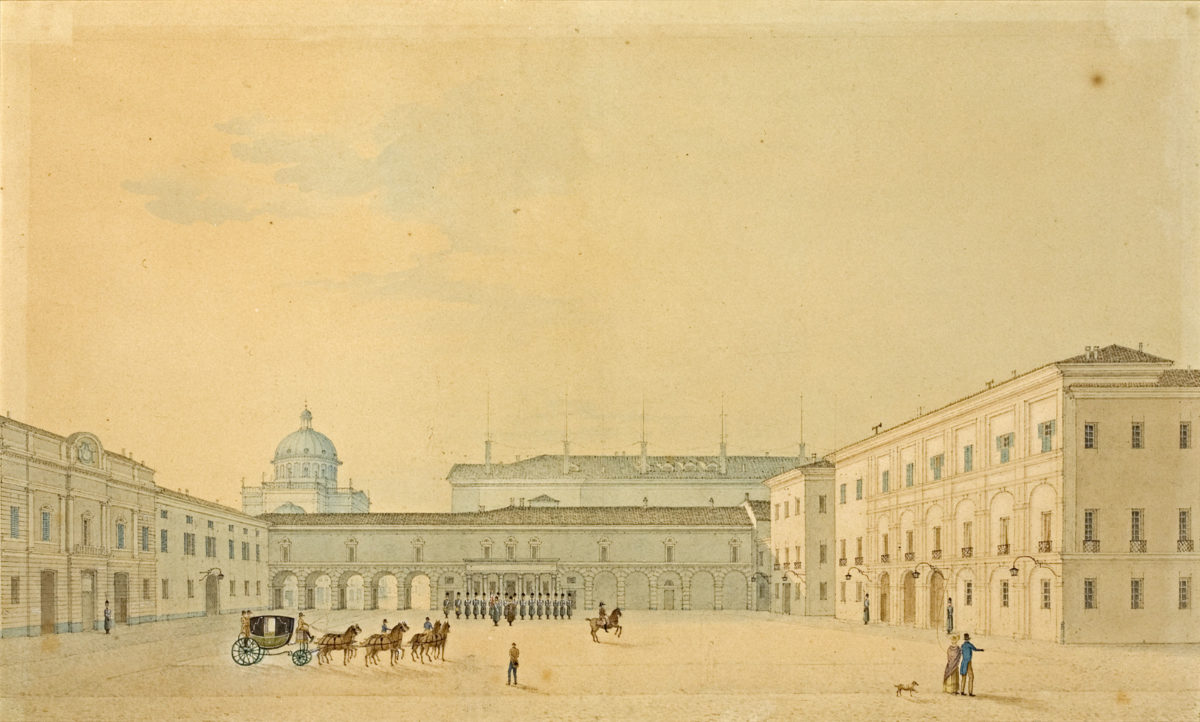
The ducal palace by Giuseppe Alinovi (1811–1848) around 1830 before the neoclassical reconstruction by Marie Louise in 1833

In 1816, upon the arrival of the new Duchess of Parma, Marie Louise (1791–1847), Napoleon's second wife, the old ducal palace still presented a rather labyrinthine and heterogeneous appearance, as depicted in a painting by Giuseppe Alinovi from around 1830. The large space left by the demolitions of the 18th century was now occupied by a square, called Piazza di Corte, which roughly corresponds to the current Piazza della Pace. On the right (west) stood the façade of the Ducal Palace that had survived the demolitions of 1767, with a temporary neo-Renaissance façade made by Petitot. In the background (south) appeared the rooftops of the Teatro Regio and the basilica of Santa Maria della Steccatta. Just in front of the aforementioned structures, there was a low building, almost an elevated passageway, which housed the guardhouse and connected the Ducal Palace with the Palazzo di Riserva, located on the left (east). The latter, currently the Glauco Lombardi Museum, had been built in 1764 by Petitot to accommodate the duke's illustrious guests, as well as a court theater.

Initially, Marie Louise only concerned herself with adapting the rooms for herself, her second husband Count Adam von Neipperg (1775–1829), and their children. A series of watercolors by Giuseppe Naudin precisely depict the interiors, which were more bourgeois than royal, of the palace.

==== Gallery: A tour of the palace interiors in the time of Marie-Louise (1832) through the watercolours by Giuseppe Naudin ====
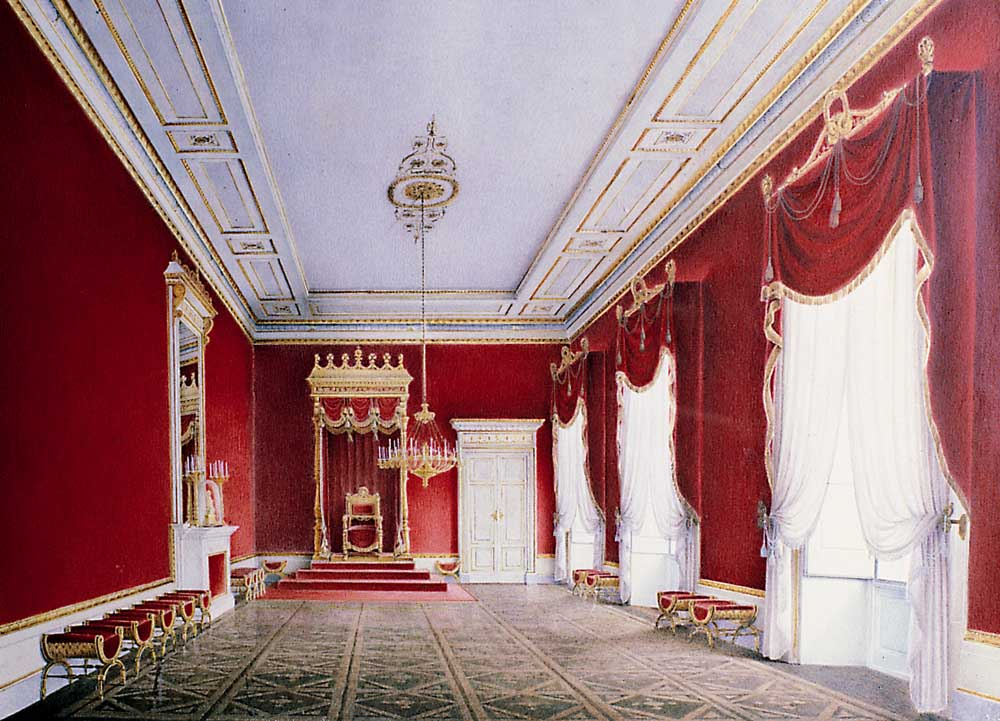
The throne room

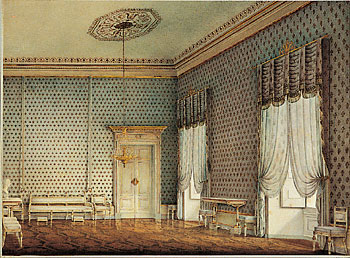
Reception room

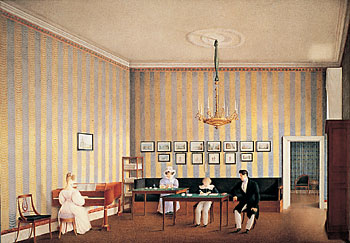
Study of Marie-Louise's children

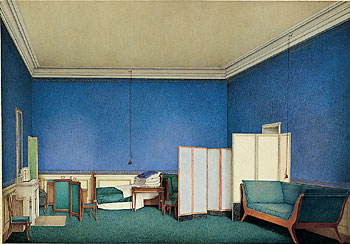
Bedroom of Adam von Neipperg

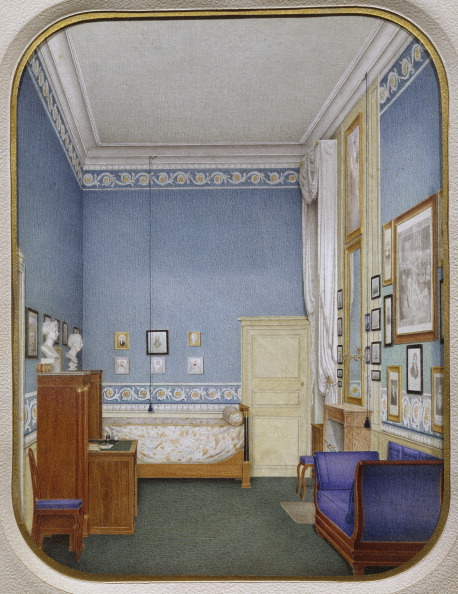
Marie-Louise's bedroom

Finally, in 1833, Duchess Marie Louise (1791–1847), engaged the architect Nicola Bettoli to reconstruct the façade in neoclassical style. The works were carried out between 1833 and 1834. The neoclassical style and the Ionic columns match the façade of the opposing Palazzo di Riserva, which was connected to the Ducal palace by a corridor. The renovation works also involved the interior of the palace, which has been captured in water colours by Giuseppe Naudin.

=== From the Italian Unification till Today ===
After the Unification of Italy, the palace became the seat of the regional prefecture. Its name changed to Palazzo del Governo. And the ducal palace was emptied of its treasures, which were transferred to other residences of the House of Savoy, such as the Quirinal Palace or the Royal Palace of Venice. The connection between the Ducal palace and the Palazzo di Riserva was demolished at the start of the 20th century.

The palace was severely hit and damaged by Allied air raids on 13 May 1944. Immediately after the Second World War, it was demolished leaving a hole in the middle of the city centre. There has been a proposal to reconstruct the palace in its original form. However, the regional superintendency for antiquities rejected the project in 1963. Various other attempts to rebuild the palace also did not have any effect. The empty space at the Piazzale della Pace was occupied by parking lots for year. But in 1998, the architect Mario Botta created a large lawn on the location of the palace.

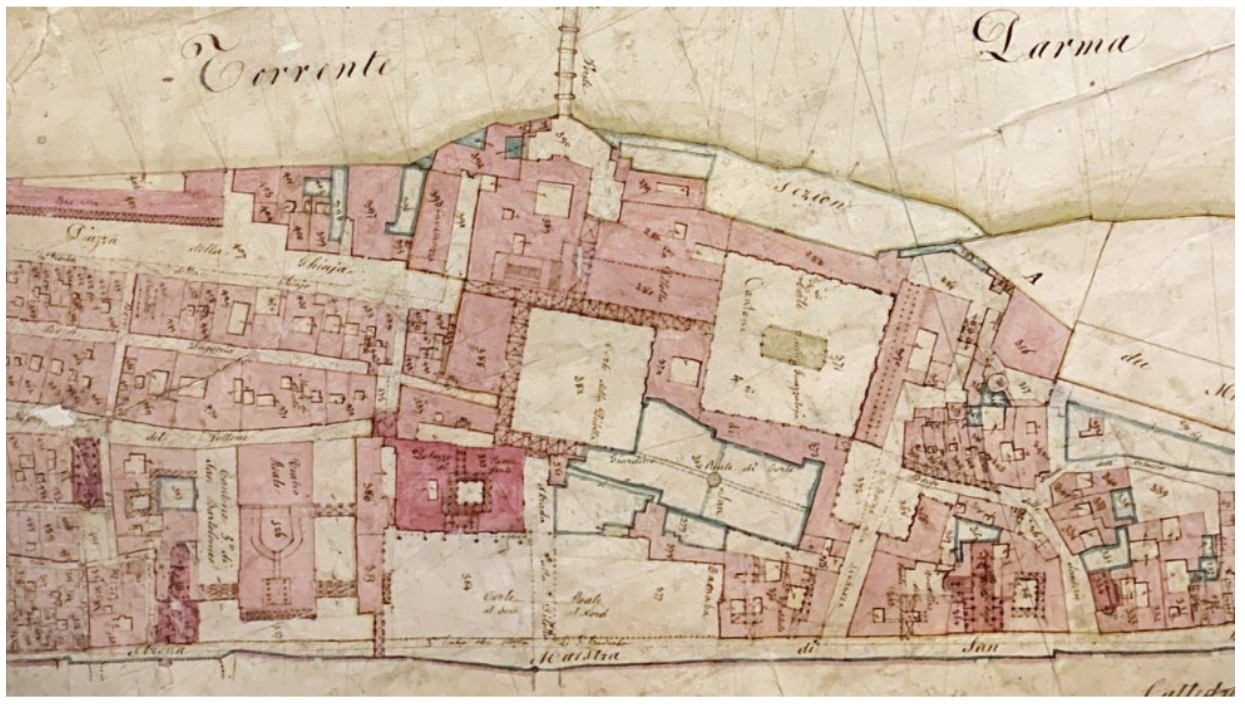
Plan of the ducal palace and its surroundings in 1856

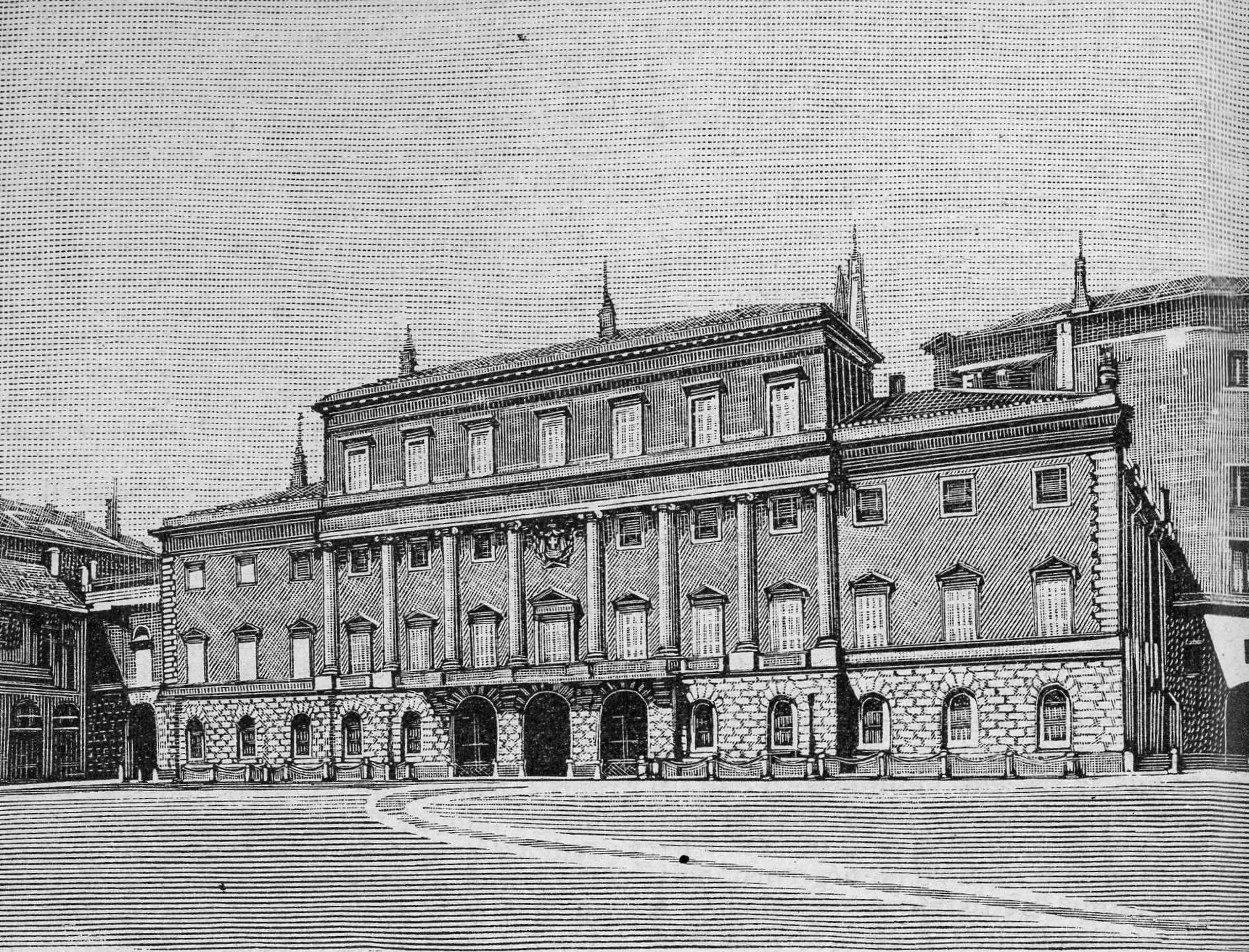
The ducal palace around 1888

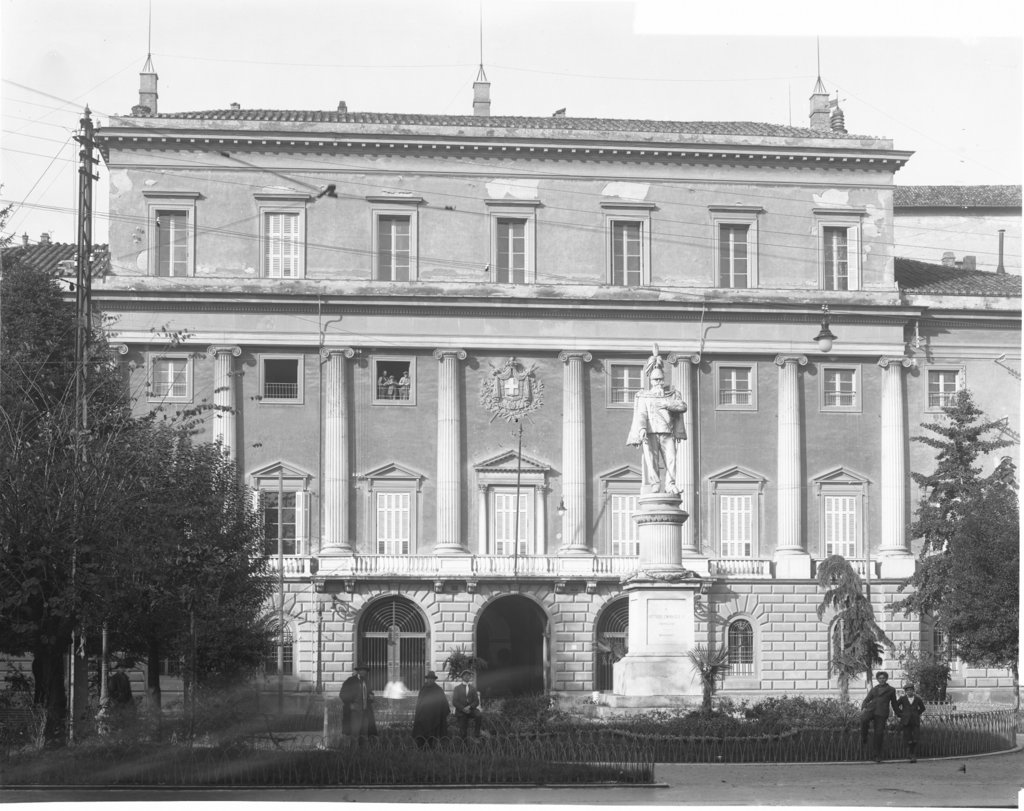
The ducal palace around 1921

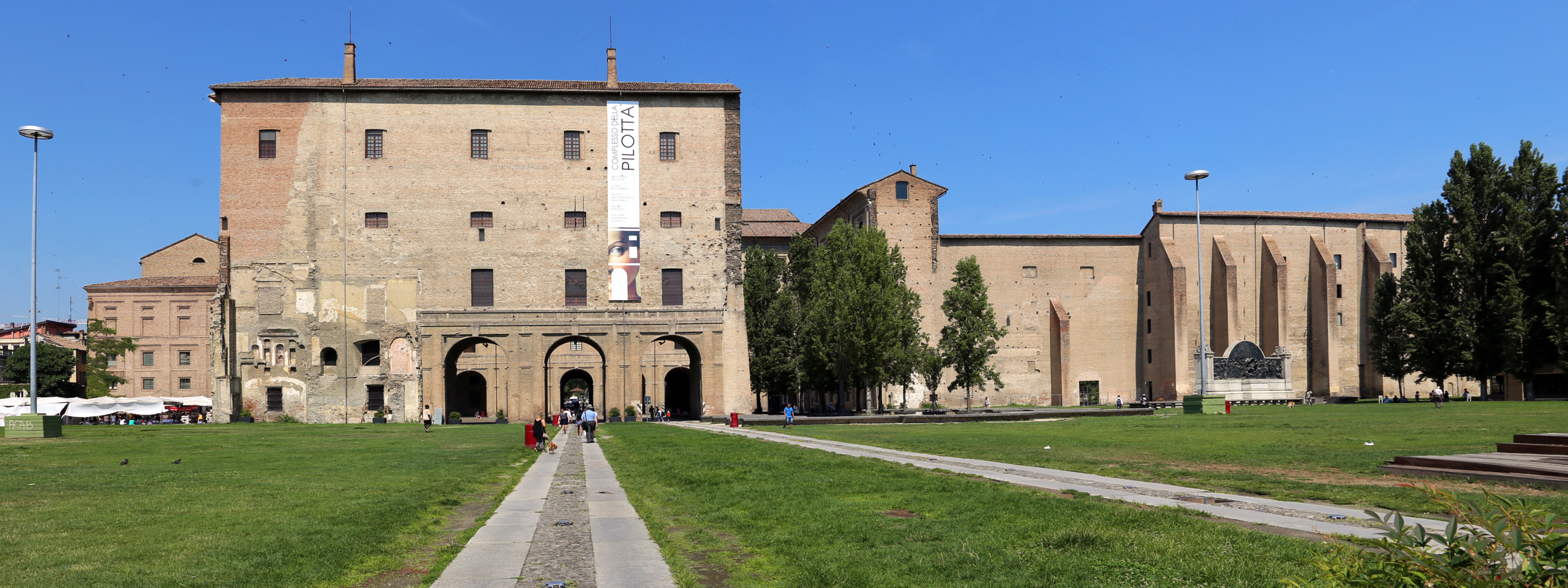
View of the Piazale della Pace with the Palazzo della Pilotta, on the left is the former location of the Ducal Palace of Parma

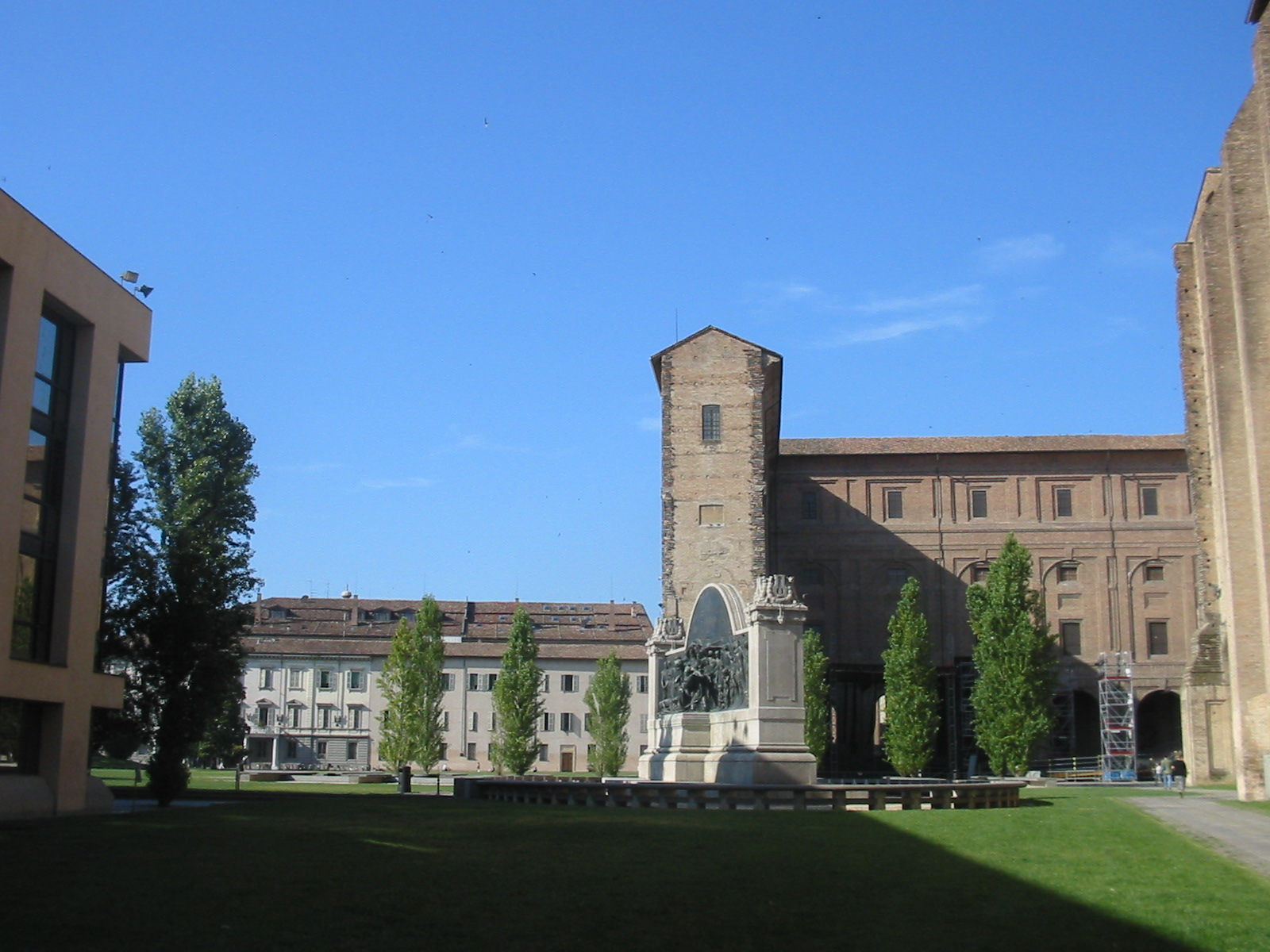
View of the Piazale della Pace with the Palazzo della Pilotta in direction of where the location was of the Ducal Palace of Parma

== Gallery: Maps and Plans of the Ducal Palace of Parma ==
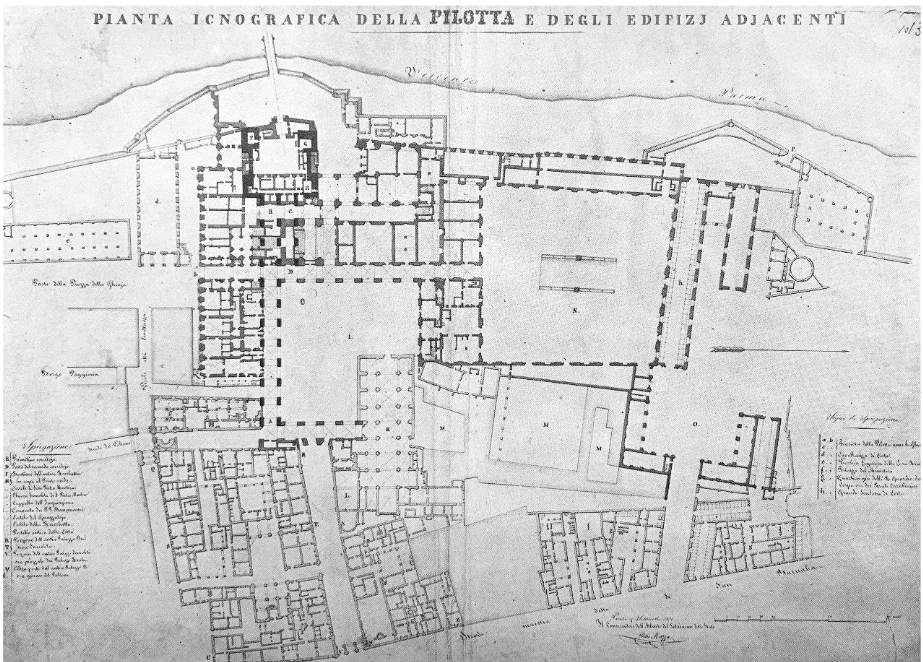
Plan of the Ducal Palace and the Pilotta Palace

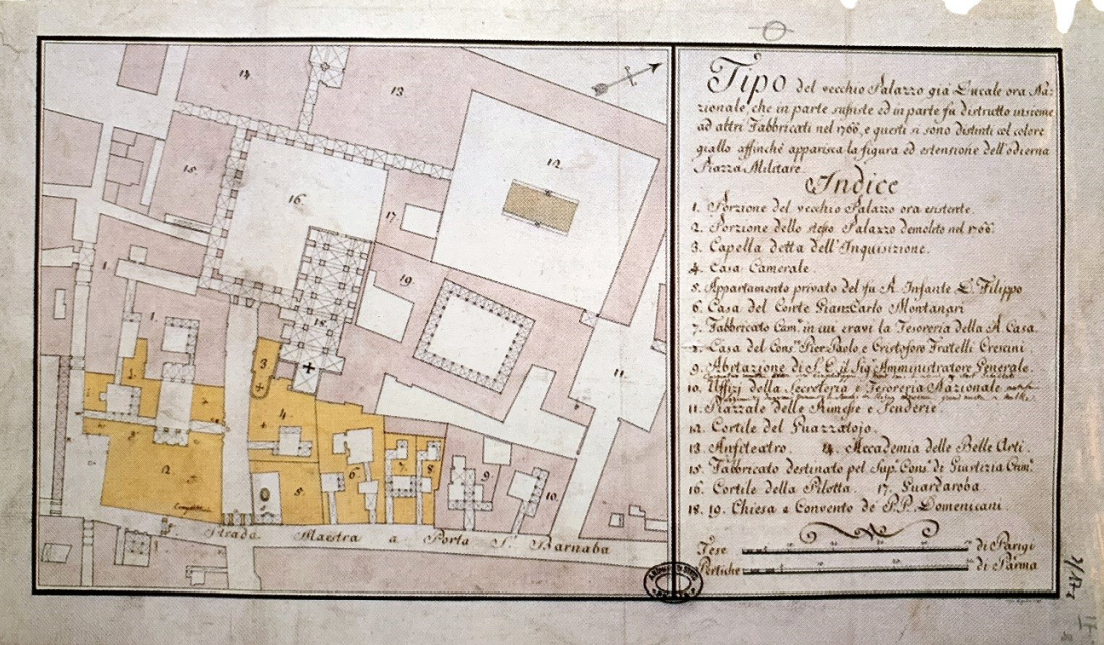
Plan of the Ducal palace before the Petitot project started. Buildings highlighted in yellow have been demolished to make room for the new design

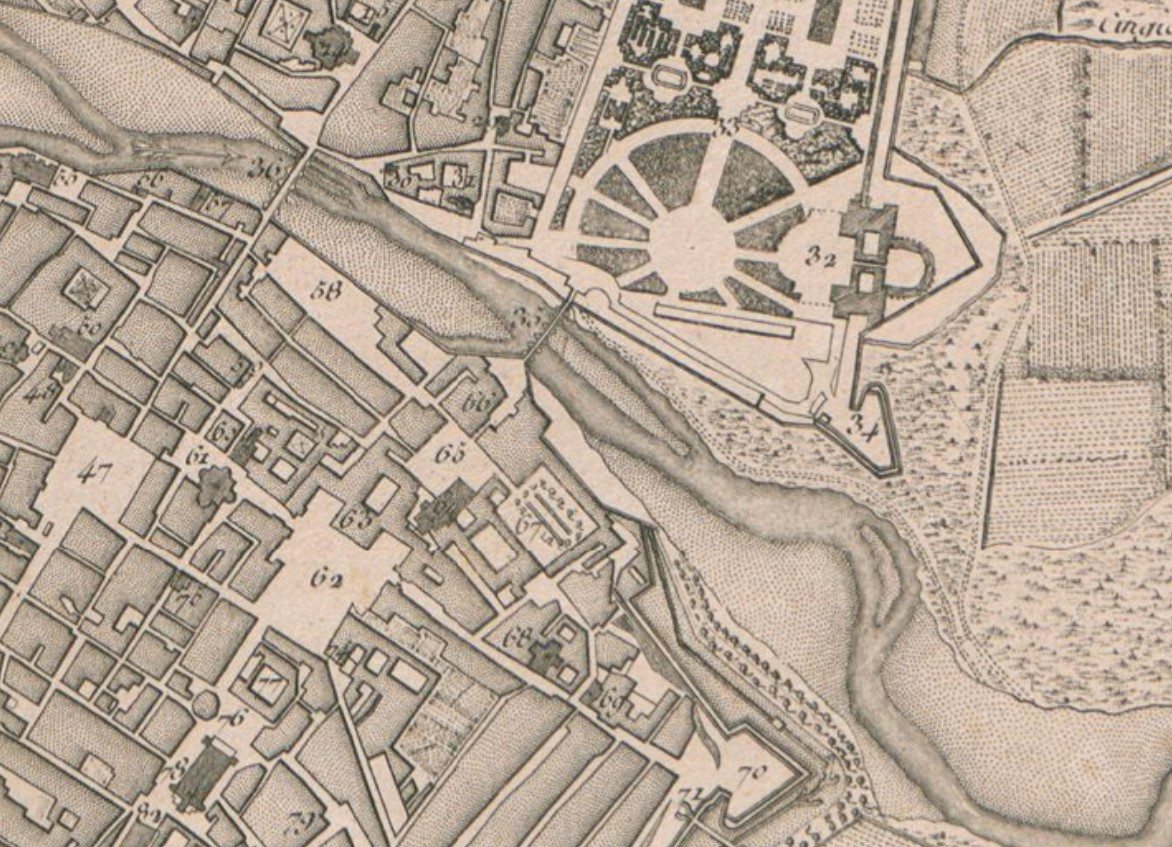
Extract from Jérôme Lalande's 1769 plan of Parma showing the Ducal Palace (nr. 63) like if the Petitot project was completed

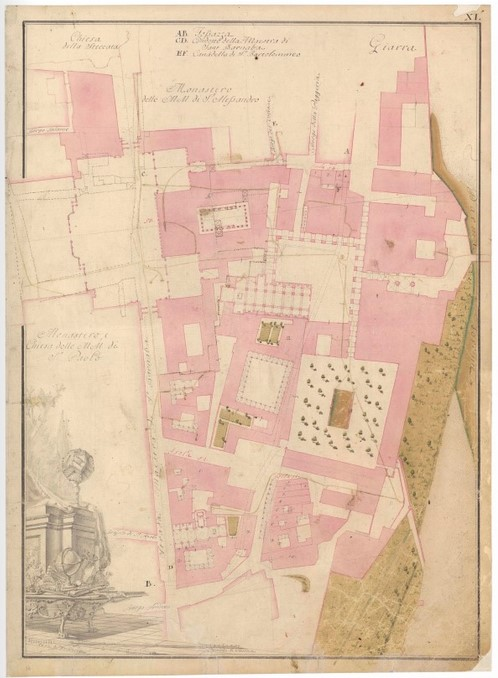
Extract from the Atlante Sardi's atlas of Parma from 1767 showing the Ducal Palace and its surroundings like if the Petitot project was completed

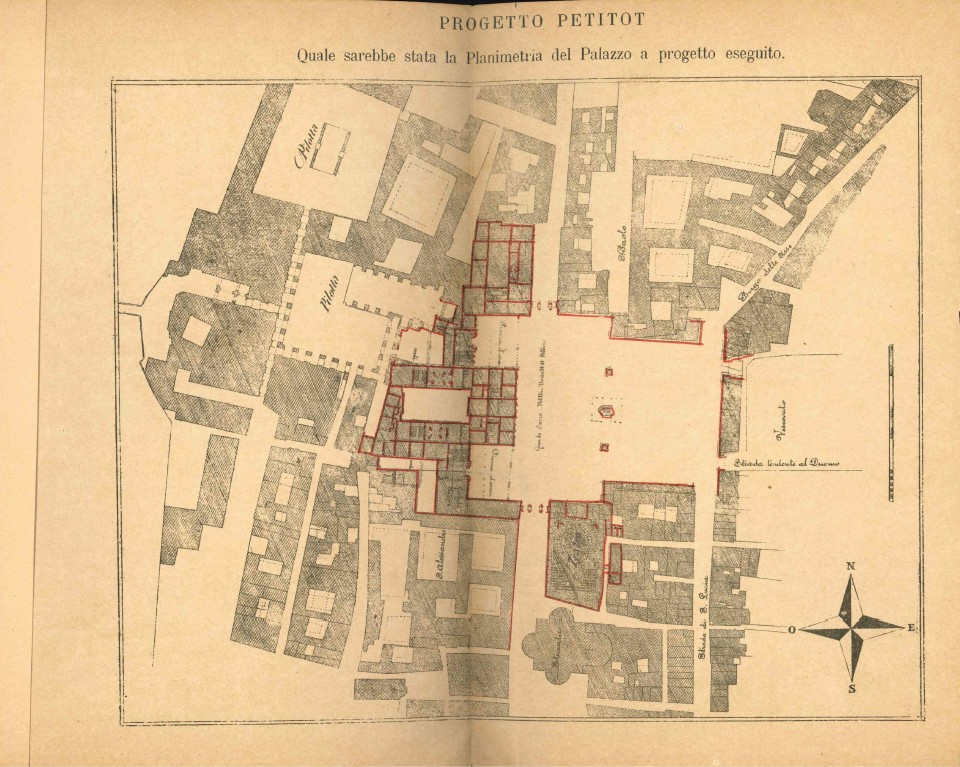
Petitot's project in relation to its surroundings

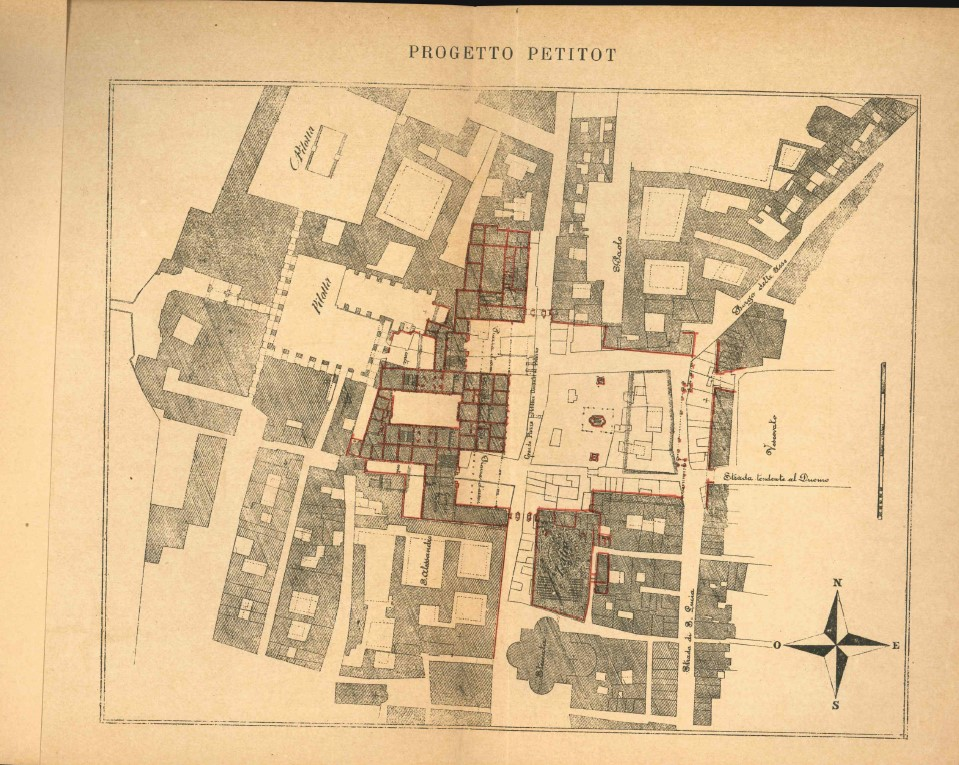
Petitot's project plan overlying the buildings that were demolished to make place

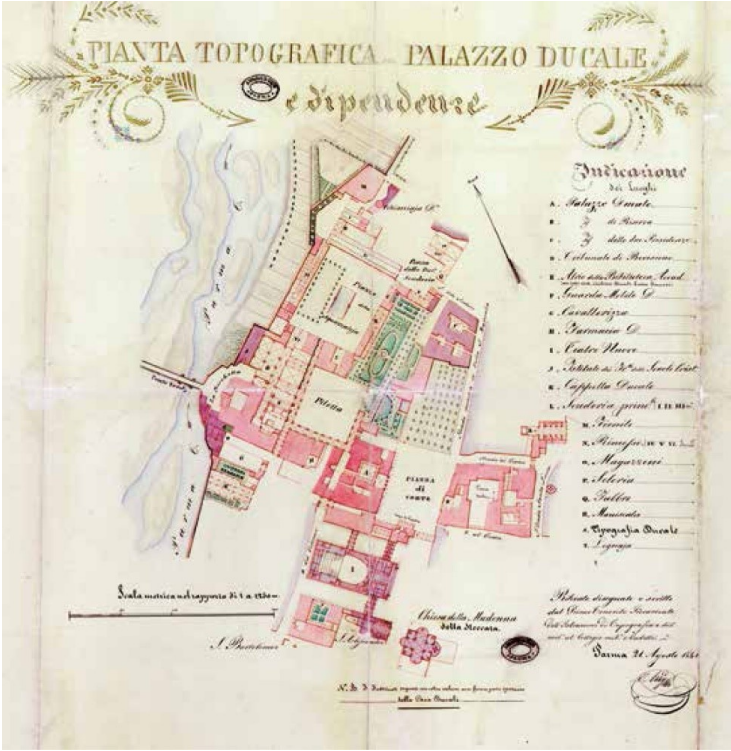
1841 map of the Ducal Palace and its surroundings
