= Pier Francesco Battistelli =

Italian painter

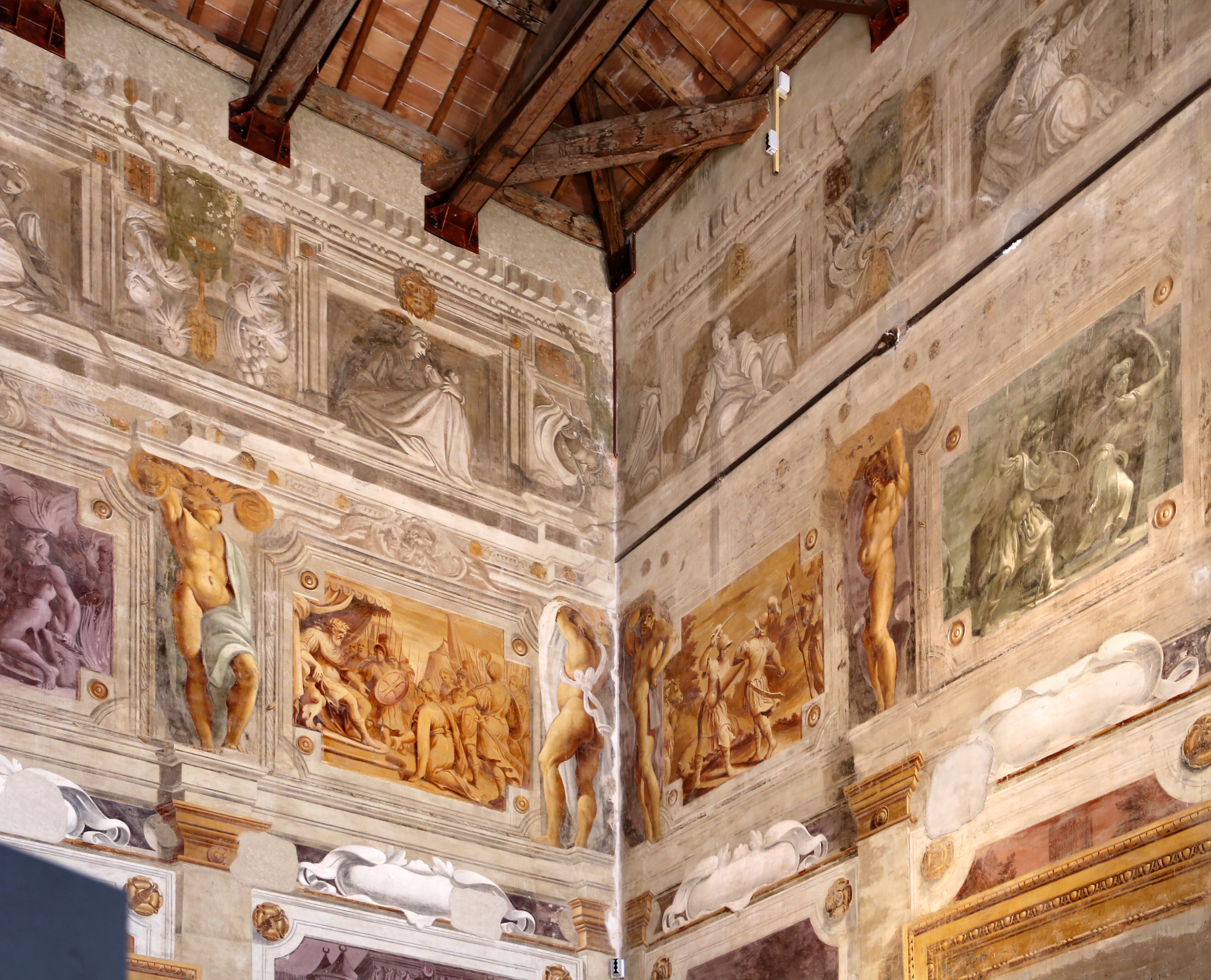
Decoration of the Sala dei Giganti in Palazzo Bentivoglio, Gualtieri (Reggio Emilia, Italy)

Pier Francesco Battistelli (17th century) was an Italian painter active in the early-Baroque period, mainly in his hometown of Bologna, as well as Parma. He painted quadratura.

== Biography ==
He was born in Pieve di Cento (Bologna) in the second half of the 16th century. Between 1605 and 1607, he is documented as an "Accademico Incamminato" (an academic of the Carracci school) and was a pupil of Girolamo Curti (known as "il Dentone"). He was a painter of architecture and adornment, "very well founded in quadrature and perspective" as Malvasia underlines, and he even taught perspective lessons at the Carracci academy.

His activity, which took place mainly in the regions between Parma and Bologna, was documented only in the second and third decades of the seventeenth century. It consists, for the most part, of ornamental-decorative works that Battistelli executed on commission of the local lords, notably the Bentivoglio family, all equally engaged in the efforts to embellish their palaces according to the standards of the new perspective taste.

Between 1614 and 1617, he established a close collaboration with Guercino, working as the team leader for the frescoes in Casa Pannini and Casa Provenzale in Cento; their bond was such that Guercino served as the godfather to Battistelli's son in 1617.

The first documented work refers to the fresco Battistelli executed in the dome of the sanctuary of the Madonna della Celletta, near Argenta, in 1613. This work, which miraculously survived the earthquake of 1624, was destroyed during the bombings of the Second World War.

Around 1617, he was commissioned by Marquis Enzo Bentivoglio to renovate the castle of Ponte Poledrano in the Baroque style, where recent studies have identified traces of his work depicting Nereids and Muses.

From 10 May 1618 he was in the service of Ranuccio I Farnese, Duke of Parma, who involved him in the decoration of the Ducal Palace of Parma. He contributed to the design of the façade of the Palazzo della Pilotta and collaborated on the Teatro Farnese.

He was later commissioned by the Duke of Mirandola to decorate the Salone delle Feste of the Ducal Palace (today's Castello dei Pico), following a design by Francesco Brizzi. In this context, Malvasia, in his Felsina Pittrice (1678), disparagingly described him as a "pittore bassissimo".

In his final years, he worked on the decoration of the Sala dei Giganti at Palazzo Bentivoglio in Gualtieri.

Battistelli died in Bologna on 16 March 1625.

== Sources ==
- Ticozzi, Stefano (1830). Dizionario degli architetti, scultori, pittori, intagliatori in rame ed in pietra, coniatori di medaglie, musaicisti, niellatori, intarsiatori d’ogni età e d’ogni nazione, vol. 1, p. 124. Milan: Gaetano Schiepatti. Google Books.
- Malvasia, Carlo Cesare (1678). Felsina Pittrice, vol. II.
- Bagni, Prisco (1984). Guercino a Cento. Le decorazioni di casa Pannini. Bologna.
