= Palazzo di Riserva =

Building in Parma, Italy

Coordinates: 44°48′13.9″N 10°19′41.1″E

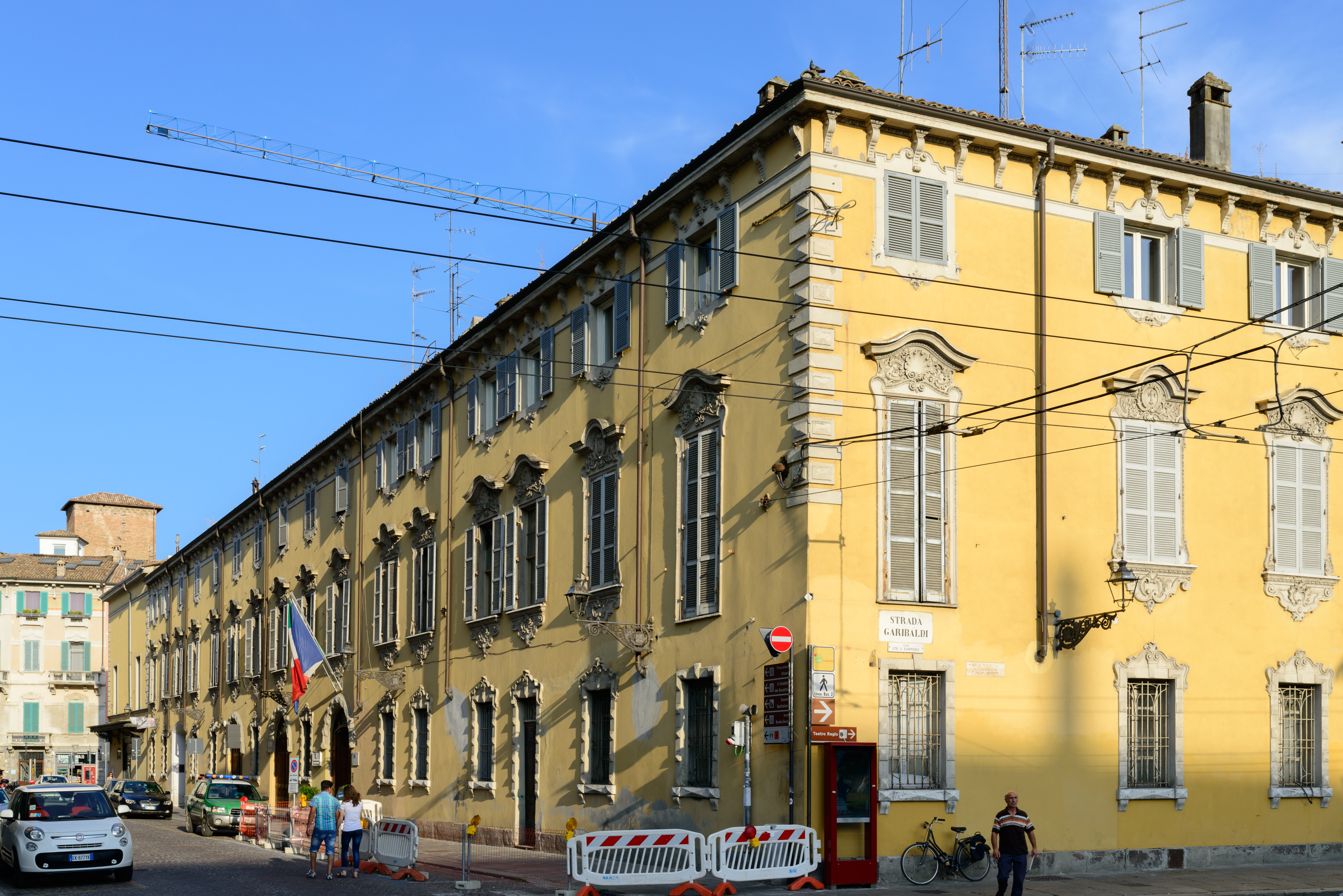
Palazzo di Riserva

The Palazzo di Riserva, also known as the Palazzo delle Poste because for long it hosted the offices of the Postal Service, is a Neoclassical-style palace in central Parma, region of Emilia Romagna, Italy. The large structure now hosts the Museo Glauco Lombardi displaying collections from 19th-century Parma, as well as offices of the postal service, the provincial forestry service, a literary club, and several shops. It has been much altered over the years.

== History ==
By the 17th century, this building was one of a series of buildings, adjacent to the Palazzo Ducale and della Pilotta, employed by the ruling Farnese for government purposes, including lodging for official visitors. It also contained the civic theater, built by Stefano Lolli in 1687, but which was later razed once the Teatro Regio (1821-1829) was built.

In 1764, rooms in the central portion, now housing the museum, were refurbished by the architect E.A. Petitot on orders of Duke Philip of Parma and his powerful minister G. Du Tillot, into a gambling hall for noblemen and courtesans.

The Bourbon Charles III, Duke of Parma (1849-1854) altered part of the structure to be his private residence. The work was entrusted to the architect Gazzola.

== See also ==
- Ducal Palace of Colorno
- Ducal Palace of Parma
- Palazzo del Giardino
- Palazzo della Pilotta
