= Giuseppe Alinovi =

Italian painter

Giuseppe Alinovi (Parma, February 25, 1811 – Parma, August 9, 1848) was an Italian painter, mainly painting vedute in a Neoclassical style, often in light watercolors. The Italian composer and court organist Giuseppe Alinovi (1790 - 1869) was his father.

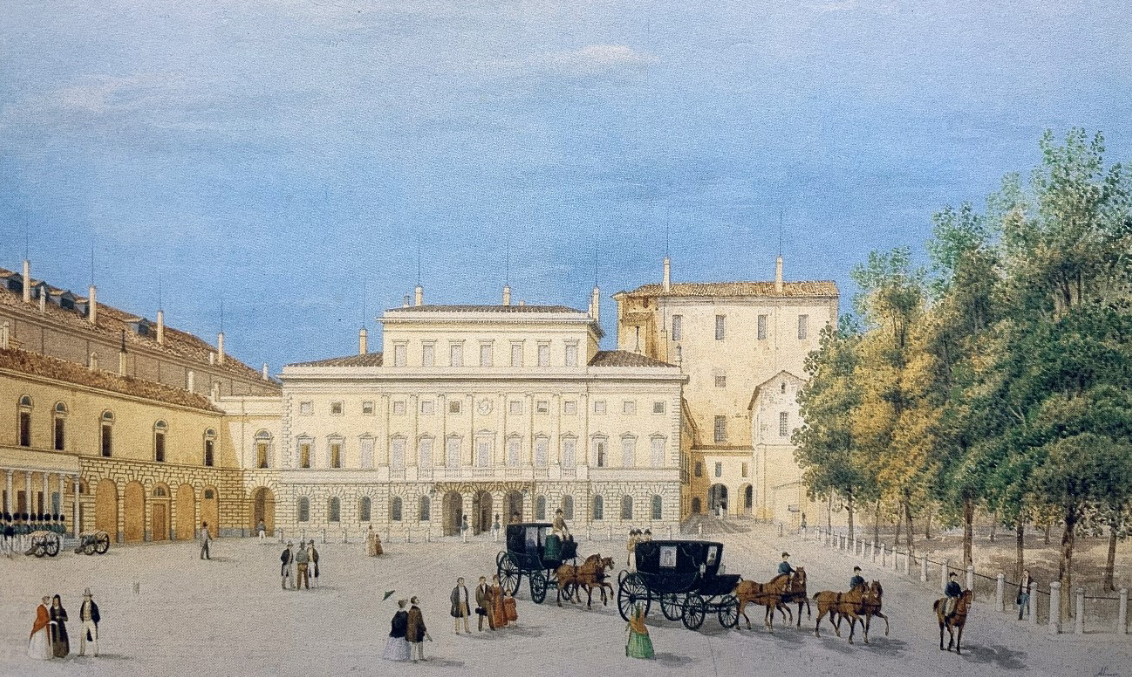
Ducal Palace of Parma.

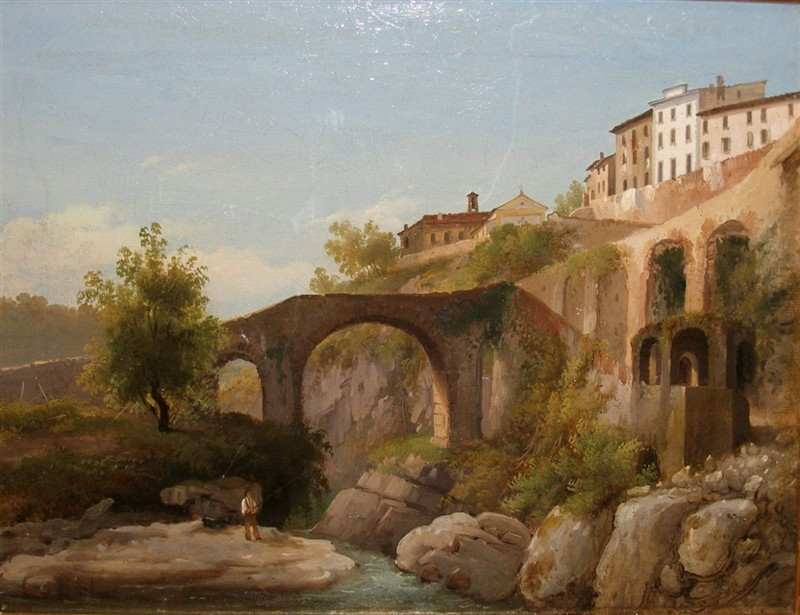
Bagnone in Lunigiana.

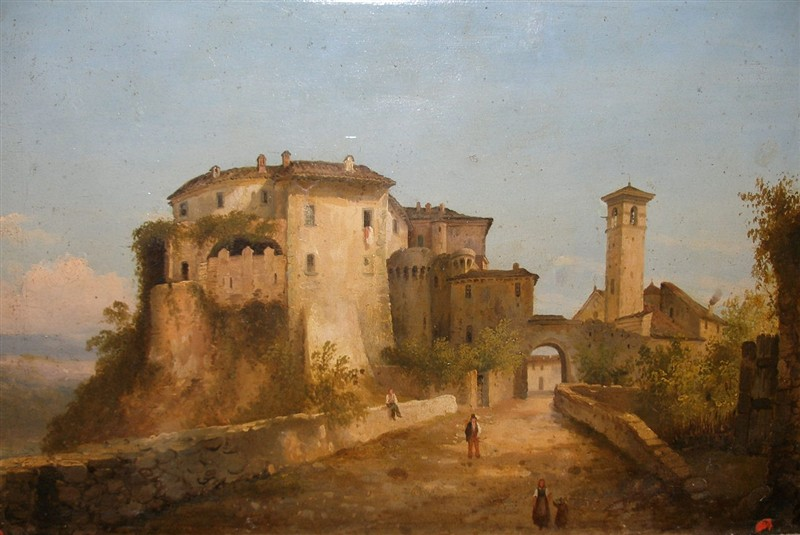
Villafranca.

== Biography ==
He trained under Giuseppe Boccaccio (1792 – 1852) in Parma. His depiction of the Fortress of San Vitale in Fontanellato is presently in the Museo Rocca Sanvitale (Art Museum) in Fontanellato. His painting of the Palazzo Ducale di Parma (1833-1834) is found in the art collections of the Fondazione Cariparma.

For an 1839 album of views of Parma, he painted La strada da Parma a Pontremoli and a Veduta d'Ischia. In the National Gallery at Parma, are two small oil paintings: Strada di villaggio con una chiesa a sinistra and Villaggio sui monti; at the Museo Glauco Lombardi are Il Castello di Fontanellato, and various watercolors, including: Il Palazzo Ducale di Parma, The Duke's Church in Colorno, The Ducal Palace of Colorno (1847), The Gardens of the Pilotta.
