= Abdon Alinovi =

Italian politician (1923–2018)

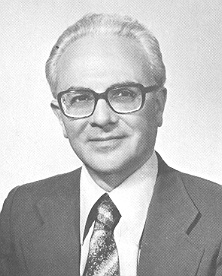

Member of the Chamber of Deputies
- In office 5 July 1976 – 22 April 1992
- Constituency: Naples

Personal details
- Born: 6 May 1923 Eboli, Kingdom of Italy
- Died: 15 February 2018 (aged 94) Naples, Italy
- Party: Italian Communist Party
- Other political affiliations: Democrats of the Left

Abdon Alinovi (6 May 1923 – 15 February 2018) was an Italian politician.

Alinovi was born in Eboli on 6 May 1923. He moved to Naples and became active in the Italian Communist Party. In 1976, Alinovi sat in the Chamber of Deputies, representing Naples until 1992. He later joined the Democrats of the Left and served as the party's Naples chapter president.

Alinovi died in Naples at the age of 94 on 15 February 2018.
