= Museo Glauco Lombardi =

Museum in Parma, Emilia-Romagna, Italy

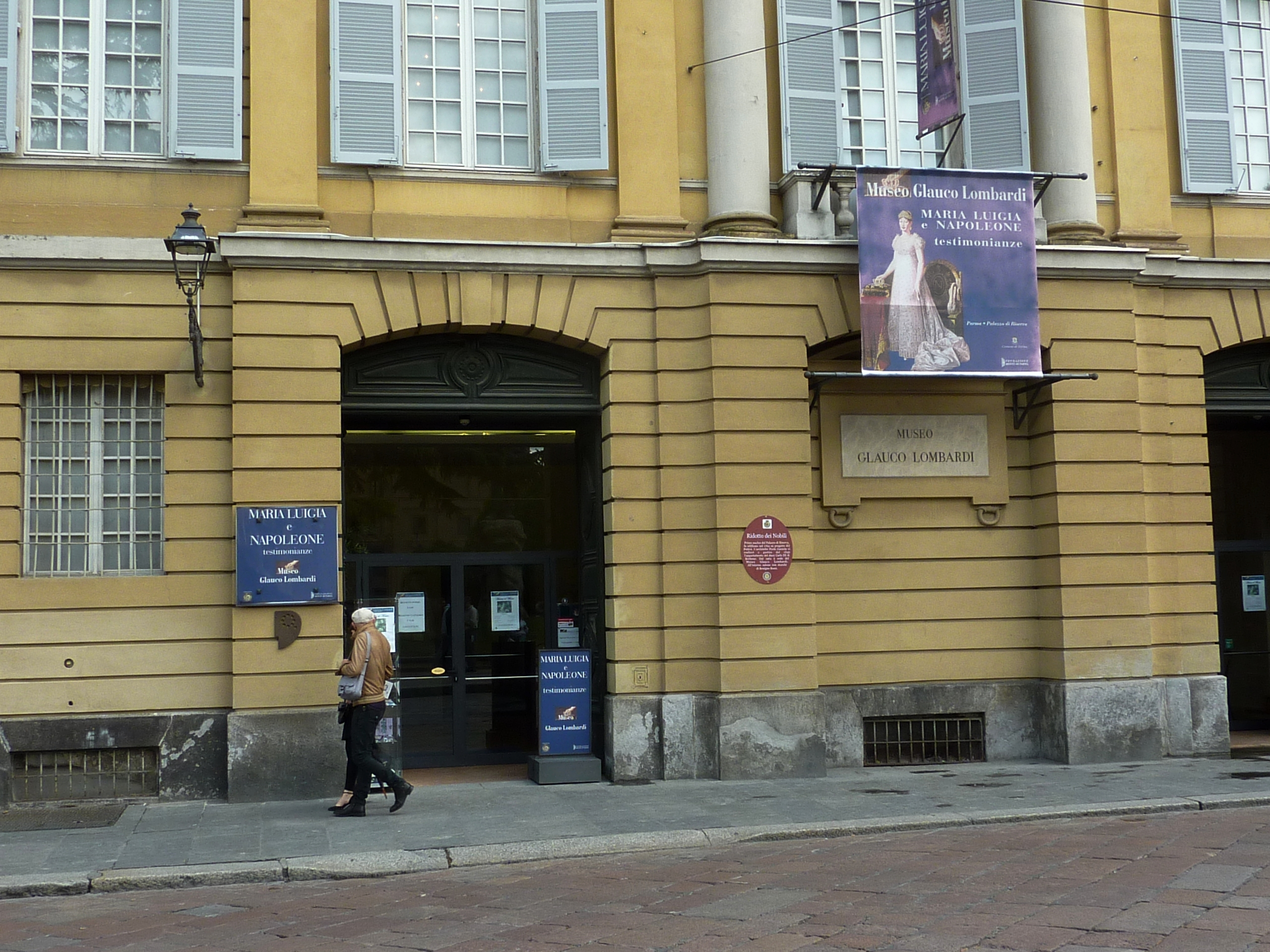
- Entrance to the Museo Glauco Lombardi (2011)
- Location: Palazzo di Riserva, Parma, Italy
- Coordinates: 44.8037°N 10.3280°E
- Website: www.museoglaucolombardi.it/en/

The Museo Lombardi is a museum displaying an eclectic collection of 19th-century art and cultural works from Parma. It is located in the Palazzo di Riserva on Strada Garibaldi #5 in central Parma, Emilia-Romagna, Italy.

== History ==
The museum was created by the efforts of Glauco Lombardi (1881–1971) to collect, study, and conserve the artistic and documentary heritage of 19th-century Parma under the Bourbons (1748–1802, 1847–1859) and Marie Louise, Duchess of Parma (1816–1847). Many of these items were largely scattered during the period of Italian Unification in various residences of the Savoy family. Lombardi often recovered the works from the antiquary market or in private collections.

From 1915 to 1943, the original nucleus of the Museo Lombardi was housed in the ballroom and adjacent rooms of the Ducal Palace of Colorno. In 1934, Lombardi was able to buy for the museum the precious objects that had belonged to Duchess Marie Louise, grandmother of the then owner, count Giovanni Sanvitale,

The Second World War and post-war years brought further difficulties, and not until 1961, was the Museo Glauco Lombardi able to reopen in new premises, within the Palazzo di Riserva in the center of Parma. From 1997 to 1999, the museum underwent a major restoration, in order to account for the new museum premises and modern and effective systems of security and display.

The collections include dresses, furniture, inkwells, engravings, jewelry, and porcelain. The museum displays a collection of 19th-century paintings from artists active or collected in Parma, including Paolo Toschi (1788–1854), Giuseppe Molteni (1800–1867), François Gérard (1770–1837) and Giuseppe Drugman (1810–1846).
