= Bodoni (disambiguation) =

Bodoni is a typeface.

Bodoni may also refer to:

- Bodoni (surname), list of people with the surname
- The Bodoni Museum, Parma-based museum devoted to Giambattista Bodoni
- Officina Bodoni, private press named after Giambattista Bodoni
