= Simone Moschino =

Italian sculptor and architect (1533-1610)

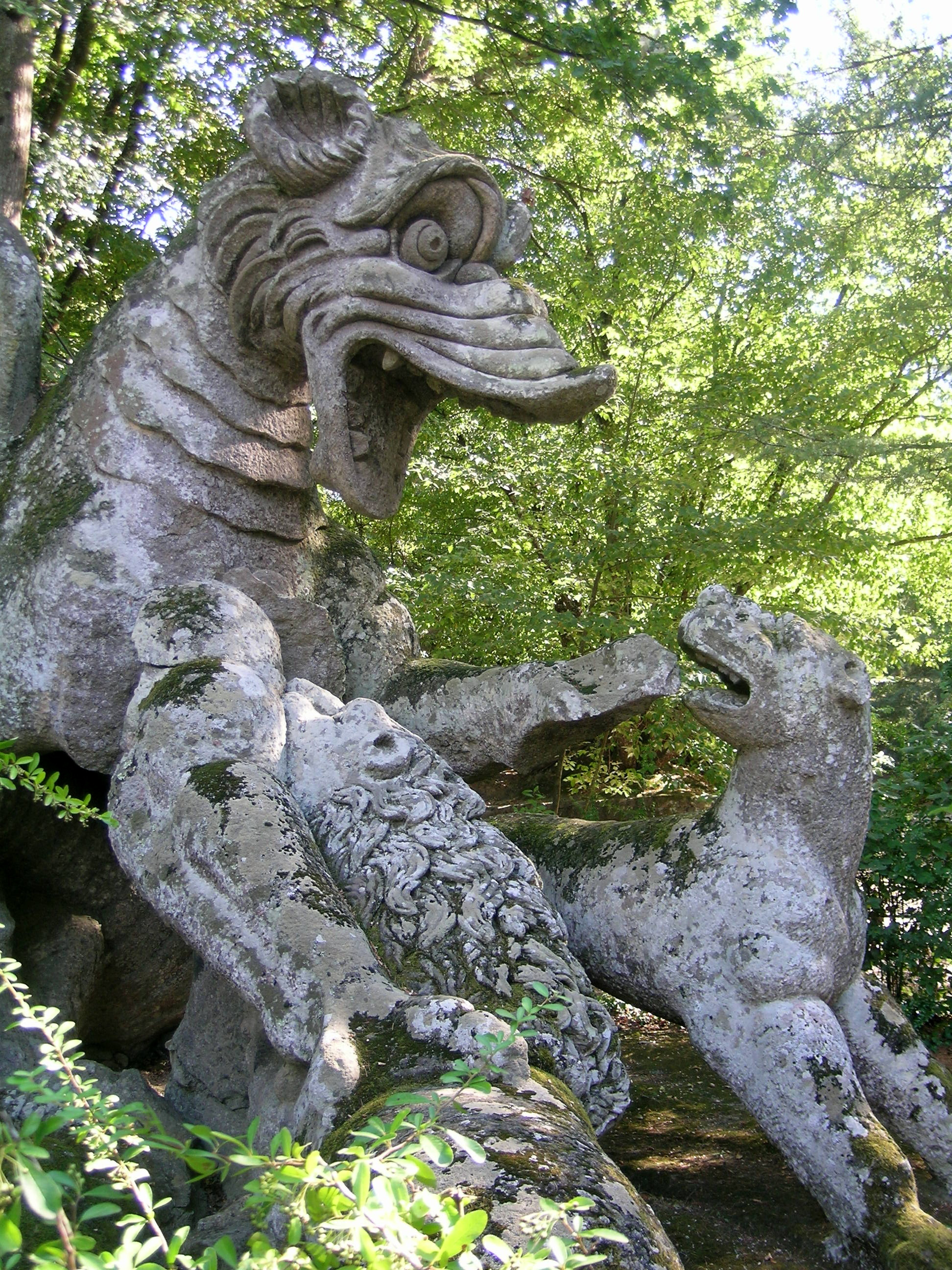
Dragon with Lions - sculpture in the Sacro Bosco di Bomarzo

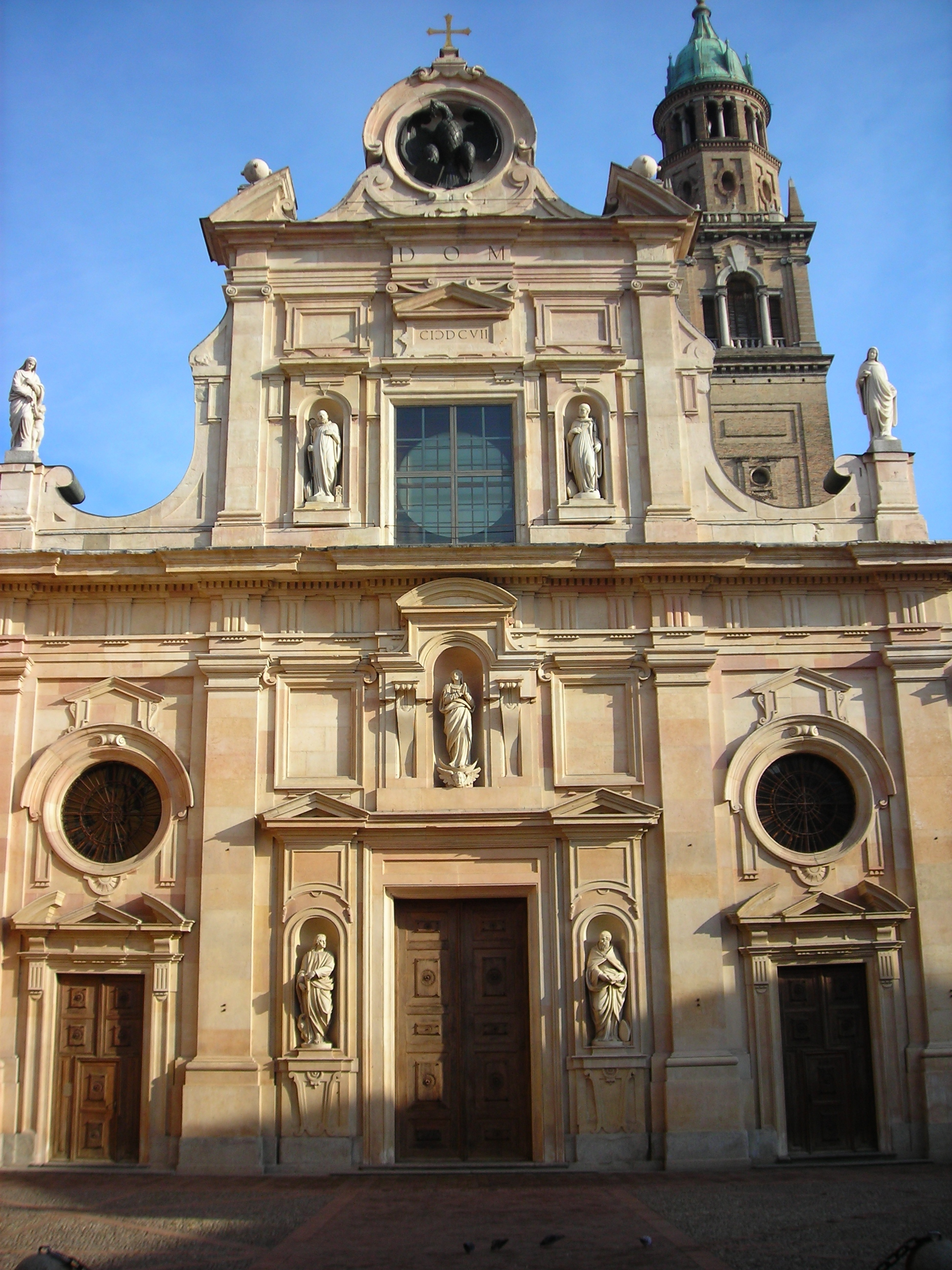
Facade of San Giovanni Evangelista (1604-07) in Parma

Simone Moschino (12 November 1553 - 20 June 1610) was an Italian Renaissance sculptor and architect, born in Orvieto as Simone Simoncelli.

The son of the court sculptor Francesco Mosca and nephew of Simone Mosca, he was trained in the Tuscan Mannerist school, particularly under Ammannati and Buontalenti. He began working as a sculptor with work for the villa Orsini in Bomarzo, before working on the statues for the Sacro Bosco di Bomarzo - at "Il Sacro Bosco di Bomarzo". In September 2007, a conference was held at Palazzo Orsini in Bomarzo, where Simone Moschino was proven to be the main artist behind the 'Bomarzo monsters' sculptures. On his father Francesco's death, Ottavio Farnese summoned Simone to Parma on the recommendation of Vicino Orsini.

In October 1578 he arrived in Parma but the following year he temporarily returned to Bomarzo, probably to complete a number of incomplete works. After returning to Parma he and Giovanni Boscoli co-produced the huge now-lost fountain in front of the new Palazzo del Giardino, with Moschino completing it after Boscoli's death in 1589. After the death of Ottavio's wife Margaret of Austria, Ranuccio Farnese had Moschino design her tomb monument in the San Sisto church in Piacenza.

He also worked as an architect in Parma, such as on the expansion of the monastery of Sant'Alessandro, the marble facade of San Giovanni Evangelista church, the monumental gateway to the Citadel of Parma and the interior of the stairway at palazzo della Pilotta. The design for the bell-tower at San Sepolcro church is attributed to him and Giovanni Battista Tinti. He died in Parma.
