= Giambattista Bodoni =

Italian type-designer, printer, and publisher (1740–1813)

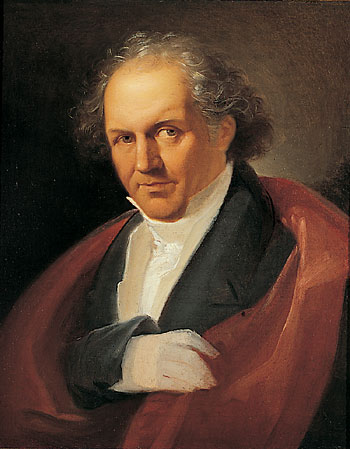
Portrait of Bodoni (c. 1805–1806), by Giuseppe Lucatelli. Museo Glauco Lombardi.

Giambattista Bodoni (/bəˈdoʊni/, Italian: [dʒambatˈtista boˈdoːni]; 16 February 1740 – 30 November 1813) was an Italian typographer, type-designer, compositor, printer, and publisher in Parma.

He first took the type-designs of Pierre Simon Fournier as his exemplars, but afterwards became an admirer of the more modelled types of John Baskerville; and he and Firmin Didot evolved a style of type called "Modern", in which the letters are cut in such a way as to produce a strong contrast between the thick and thin parts of their body. Bodoni designed many typefaces, each one in a large range of type sizes. He is even more admired as a compositor than as a type designer, as the large range of sizes which he cut enabled him to compose his pages with the greatest possible subtlety of spacing. Like Baskerville, he sets off his texts with wide margins and uses little or no illustrations or decorations.

Bodoni achieved an unprecedented level of technical refinement, allowing him to faithfully reproduce letterforms with very thin "hairlines", standing in sharp contrast to the thicker lines constituting the main stems of the characters. He became known for his designs of pseudoclassical typefaces and highly styled editions, some considered more apt "to be admired for typeface and layout, not to be studied or read". His printing reflected an aesthetic of plain, unadorned style, combined with purity of materials. This style attracted many admirers and imitators, surpassing the popularity of French typographers such as Philippe Grandjean and Pierre Simon Fournier. Bodoni has also had his share of detractors, including William Morris, who felt that his almost mechanical perfection seemed cold and inhumane.

There have been several modern revivals of his typefaces, all called Bodoni. They are often used as display faces.

== Biography ==
=== Childhood in Saluzzo (1740–1758) ===
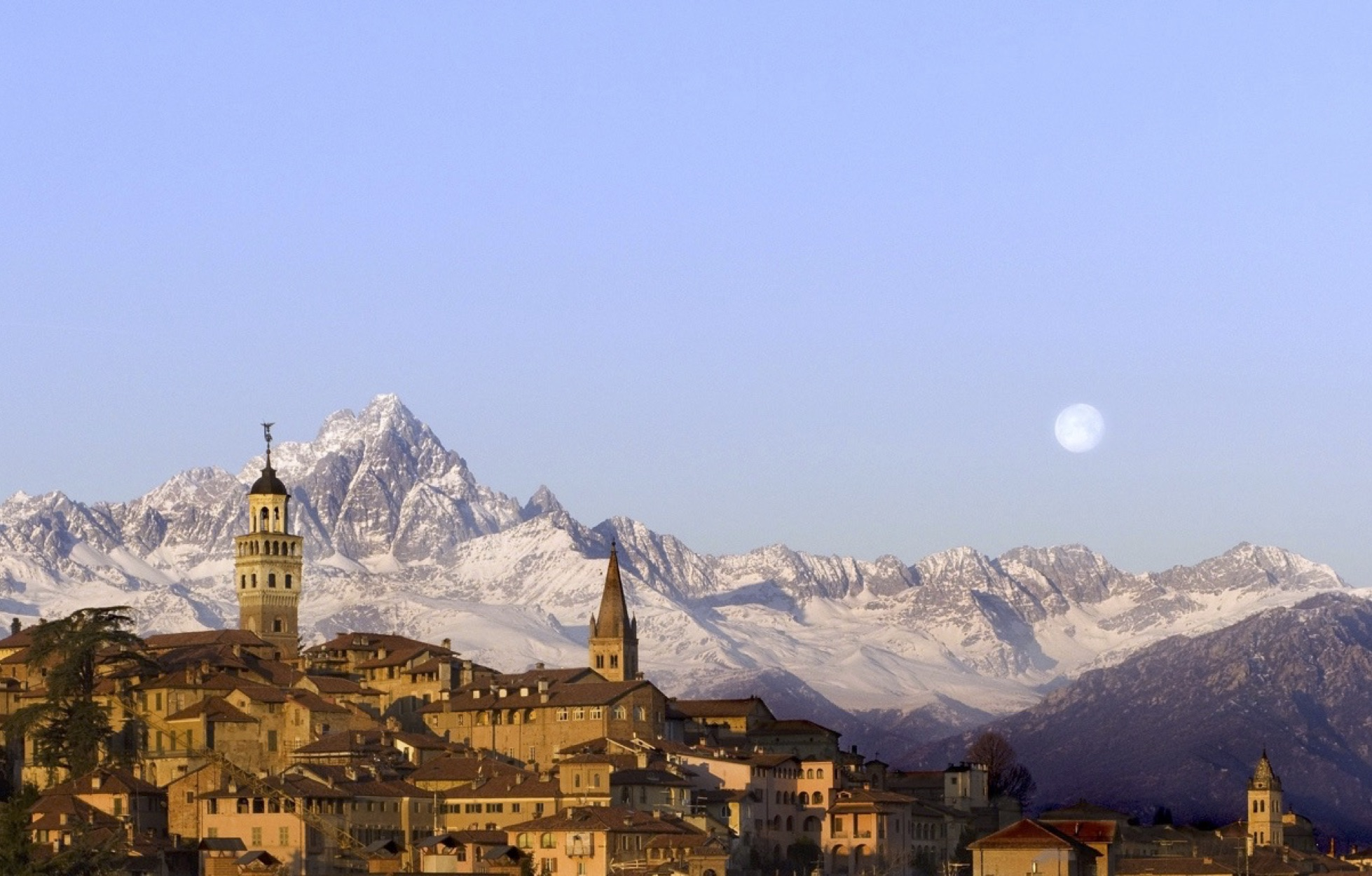
Saluzzo with Monviso in background

Bodoni's birthplace is set in the foothills of the Cottian Alps, in what was then Kingdom of Sardinia, and is now Piedmont. He was the seventh child and fourth son of Francesco Agostino Bodoni and Paola Margherita Giolitti. His father and grandfather were both printers in Saluzzo, and as a child his toys were his grandfather's leftover punches and matrices. He learned the printing trade working at his father's side, and his gift for wood-engraving and printing was evident very early. So was his ambition and liveliness. At the age of 17 he decided to travel to Rome with the intention of securing fame and fortune as a printer. He left Saluzzo on 8 February 1758.

=== Training in Rome (1758–1766) ===
In Rome, Bodoni found work as an assistant compositor (typesetter) at the press of the Sacra Congregatio de Propaganda Fide (The Congregation for the Evangelization of Peoples), the missionary arm of the Vatican. He flourished under the careful supervision of Cardinal Giuseppe Spinelli, the prefect of the Propaganda Fide, and Costantino Ruggieri, the superintendent of the press. One of his first tasks was sorting and cleaning punches in a wide variety of Middle Eastern and Asian languages. Bodoni quickly demonstrated his gift for exotic languages and, as a

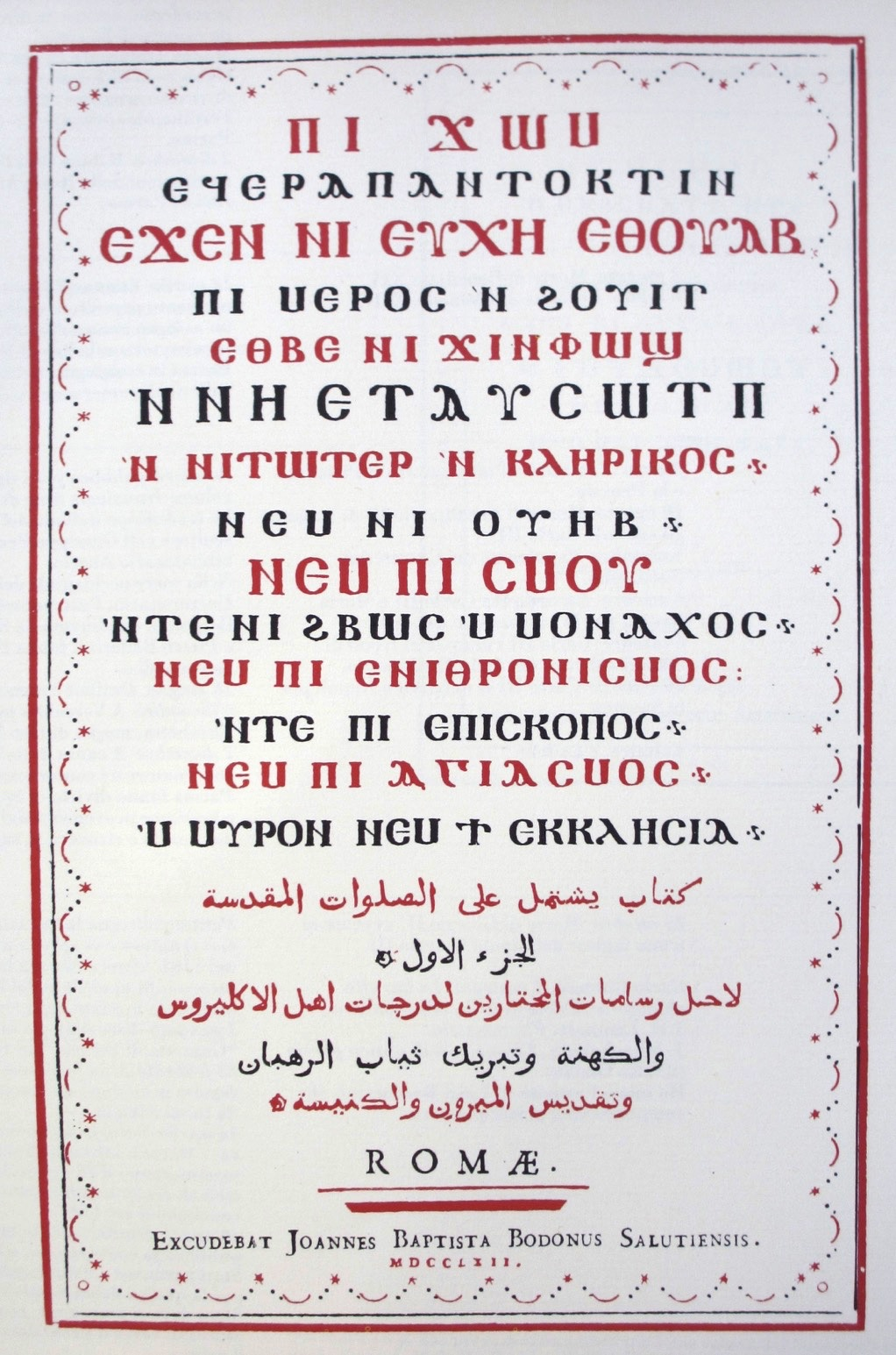
Pontificale copto-arabo with Bodoni acknowledgement.

result, he was sent to study Hebrew and Arabic at “La Sapienza,” (Sapienza University of Rome). Bodoni soon became the press's compositor of foreign languages, and began to typeset books. Spinelli and Ruggieri were so delighted with his work on the "Pontificale Arabo-Copto" that they allowed him to add his name and birthplace to subsequent printings. He then began cutting his own punches.

After eight years at the Propaganda Fide press, Bodoni's remarkable skill was renowned, but he was ripe for change. Saddened by the death of Spinelli and Ruggieri's tragic suicide, and encouraged by British friends, he left Rome for England, a country which, under the influence of Baskerville whose books were much admired on the Continent, had become a leader in printing innovation. (Note: It is not certain, though, that Bodoni actually planned to come to England with the specific goal of meeting Baskerville, as has sometimes been reported.) Bodoni's plan was summarily scotched by sickness; on his journey north, he succumbed to Tertian fever (malaria), and returned home to Saluzzo to recuperate.

=== Life and work in Parma (1768–1813) ===
After convalescing in Saluzzo, Bodoni started working with his father again. Meanwhile, in Parma, the young duke, Don Ferdinando di Borbone (Duke Ferdinand of Parma), and the prime minister, Guillaume du Tillot, were making plans to start a royal press. They wanted someone hardworking and talented to set it up and run it. Father Paolo Maria Paciaudi, the librarian at Parma, who had known Bodoni in Rome, put the young man's name forward. In February 1768, with the permission of Duke Vittorio Amedo III of Savoy, Bodoni left Saluzzo for the court of Parma.

He started work right away. The challenge was tremendous; he needed help, so wrote to two of his brothers to come from Saluzzo to assist him. One of them, Giuseppe, remained by his side at the press in Parma for over 30 years. In tandem with Du Tillot, Bodoni acquired everything necessary for a printing business of the highest order: presses, paper, ink, tools, and he ordered type from Fournier in France. He used Fournier's letters for early work published in Parma, gradually replacing it with his own imitations of Fournier, and eventually developing his own style.

His first major publication at the royal press was the extravagant volume in celebration of the wedding of the duke of Parma to Archduchess Maria Amalia of Austria, "Descrizione delle Feste Celebrate in Parma per le Auguste Nozze . . ."As an example of its kind, it remains unsurpassed in its beauty and printing technique, and it showed the rest of Europe that the young Italian was a printer to be reckoned with.

Several major presentation volumes would follow, along with the various publications required by the court: announcements, invitations, posters, and many sonnets written by those who wished their work to be printed by the great Bodoni. He also began a series of specimen volumes, the first of which, "Fregi e majuscule" (1771) was in direct imitation of Fournier. His Manuale tipografico of 1788 paved the way for his masterwork, the "Manuale tipografico" of 1818, published posthumously by his widow.

Other cities tried to woo Bodoni away from Parma. Other patrons wished to oust the duke. The most formidable of these was José Nicolás de Azara, the Spanish ambassador to Rome. He felt Bodoni was wasting himself on unimportant work for the duke when he should instead be printing gorgeous editions of the classics. Bodoni was tempted by the offer to move to Rome, but in 1791, when the duke realized the seriousness of the threat, he offered Bodoni his own private press where he could print whatever he wished for whomever he wished. Bodoni had no desire to leave comfortable Parma, where he had just married (at the age of 51) Margherita Dall’Aglio, a local woman 18 years his junior. He remained in Parma for the rest of his life, running both ducal and private presses, and printing editions of the classics for Azara and other patrons.

In the years following 1791, Bodoni produced much of his greatest work, including the great classics of Horace, Virgil, Anacreon, Tasso, and Homer, among others. Napoleon was so delighted with the gift of Bodoni's "Iliad" that he made him a Chevalier of the Order of the Reunion and gave him a pension for life.

The duke of Parma died suddenly and mysteriously in 1802, the duchess fled to Prague, and the French swooped in to fill the vacuum. Bodoni, who lived to work, was apolitical and had no trouble in allying himself with the new régime.

His fame became comparable to that of today's rock star. Visitors flocked to his print works on the banks of the river Parma, wanting a glimpse of him working in his studio. Benjamin Franklin, a printer himself, wrote a fan letter. In 1805, even the emperor Napoleon and empress Josephine visited the city and asked to see him; alas, that very day Bodoni was confined to bed with a disastrous attack of gout, a disease that was to plague him until the end of his life.

On his trip to Paris to crown Napoleon emperor, Pope Pius VII had been impressed by a copy of Jean-Joseph Marcel's "Oratio Dominica", which contained the Lord's Prayer in 150 languages. Visiting Bodoni on his way back to Rome, he challenged him to surpass the Frenchman's achievement. Bodoni took up the challenge, and in 1806 he was able to present the Pope with an "Oratio Dominica" in 155 languages.

Before his death on 30 November 1813, Bodoni had started work on a series of French classics for his new patron, Joachim Murat, Napoleon's brother-in-law. The "Théatre Complet de Jean Racine" was on the press on the day of his death. His favorite title page was the one for "Boileau Despréaux."

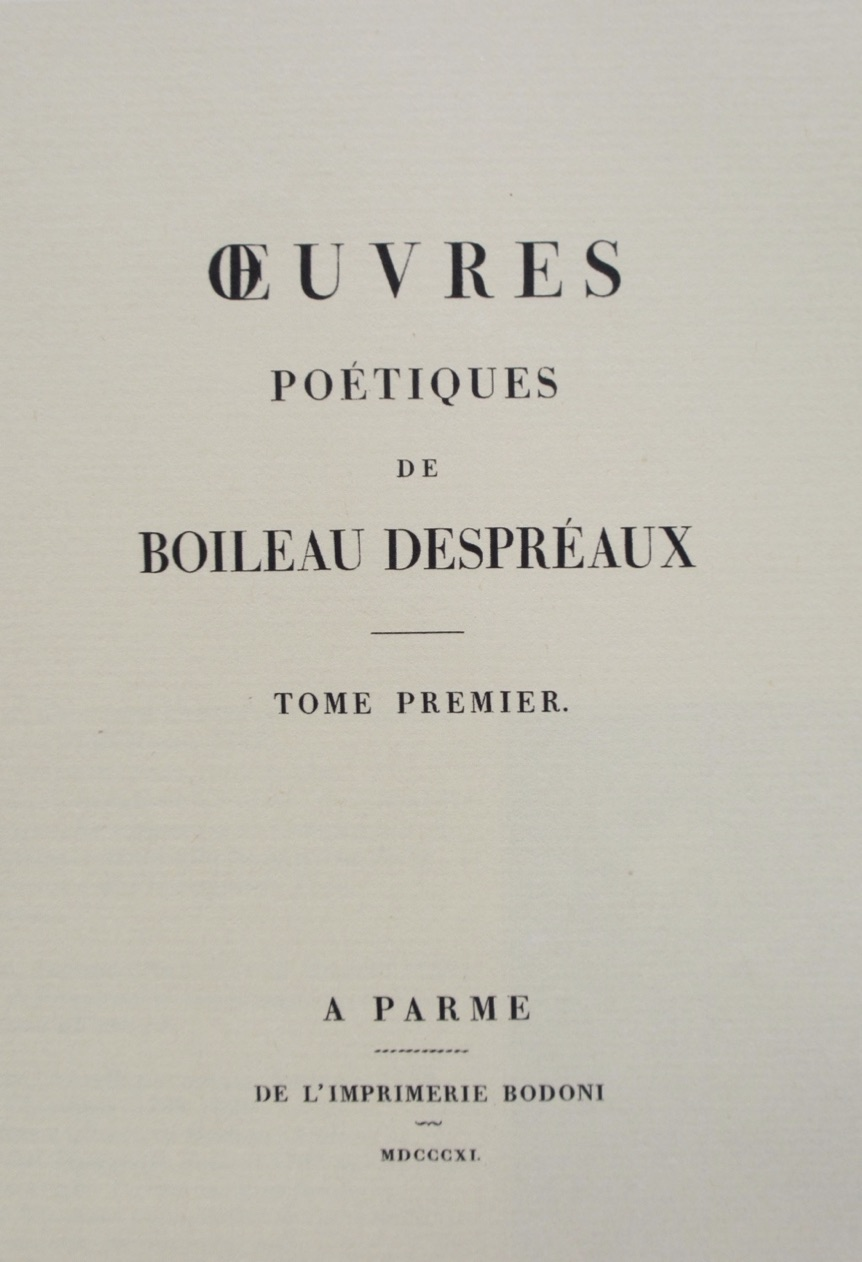
Title page. Boileau Despréaux.

He had to cut the type expressly for the title to fit on one line. It would be up to Bodoni's widow to complete the series. Margherita Dall’Aglio Bodoni picked up where her husband left off, completed the French classics, and then five years after Bodoni died, published the Manuale typografico of 1818, the specimen book to end all specimen books. Published in two volumes, it was over 600 pages long and contained 265 pages of roman characters, “imperceptibly declining in size, romans, italics, and script types, and the series of 125 capital letters; 181 pages of Greek and Oriental characters; 1036 decorations and 31 borders; followed in the last 20 pages by symbols, ciphers, numerals, and musical examples.

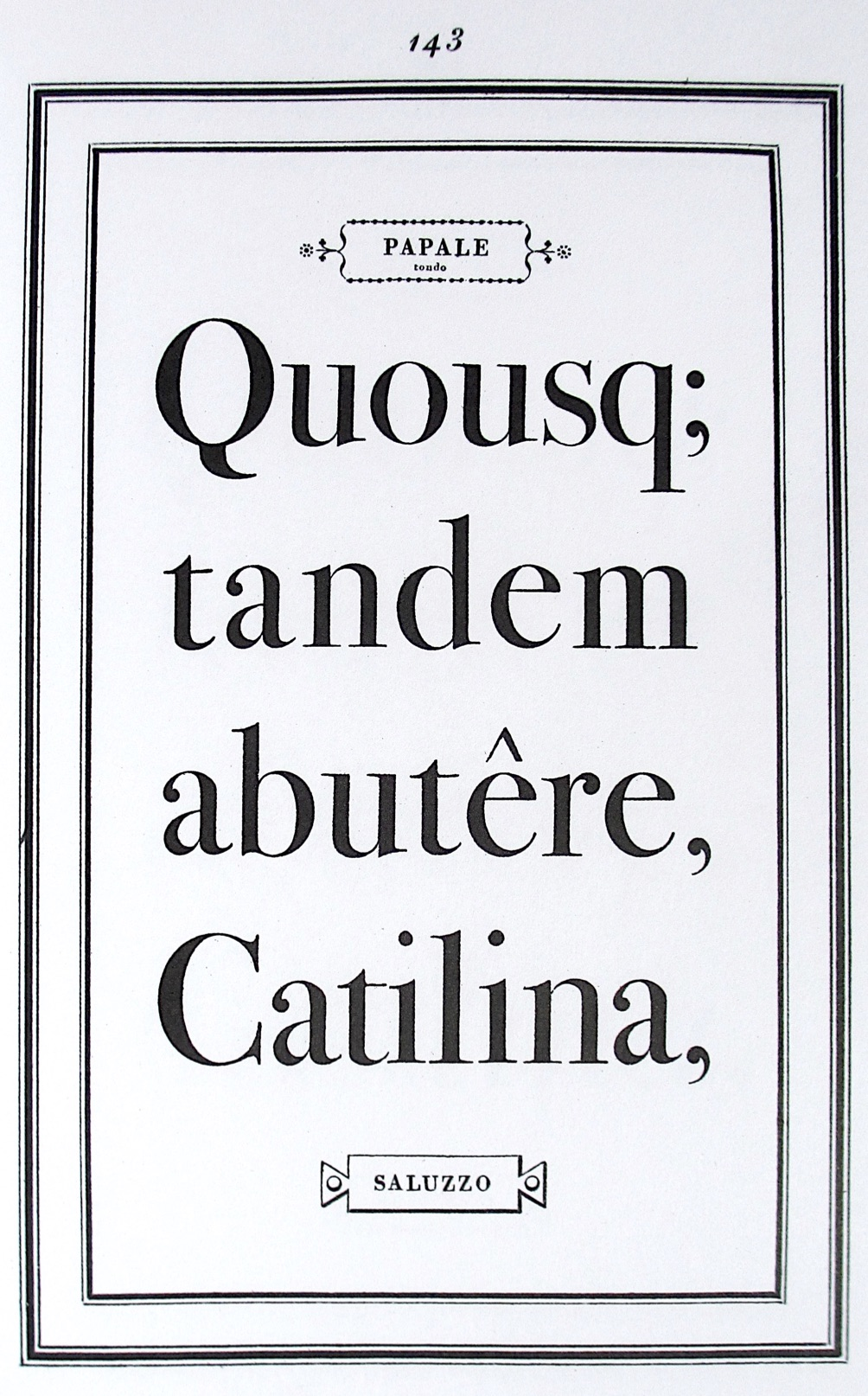
Quosque tandem . . . The largest Bodoni font of all (in honor of Saluzzo).

”

== Since 1813 ==
=== Bodoni Museum ===
The Museo Bodoniano was opened in Parma, Italy in 1963. The entrance is shared with the Biblioteca Palatina, both housed within the museum and theater complex of the Palazzo della Pilotta.

== Notable editions ==
- Descrizione delle Feste Celebrate in Parma per le Auguste Nozze… (1769?)
- Epithalamia Exoticis Linguis Reddita (1775)
- Santorini's Anatomici summi septemdecim tabulae… (1775)
- Aminta (1780)
- The Works of Homer (1791)
- Virgil's Aeneid (1793)
- The Divine Comedy (1795)
- Didymi Taurinensis de Pronuntiatione Divini Nominis (1799) Horne called this volume "A most elegant edition, particularly on account of the diversity of characters..."
- Oratio Dominica (1806)
- Homer's Iliad (1808) This work has been singled out for praise for the fidelity of the Greek letters to the form of those in Greek manuscripts.
- Cimelio… (1811)
- Oeuvres Poétiques de Boileau (1811)
- Manuale tipografico (1818, posthumous)

== See also ==
- Bodoni, a series of typefaces
- Amoretti Brothers
