= Jacopo Bertoia =

Italian painter

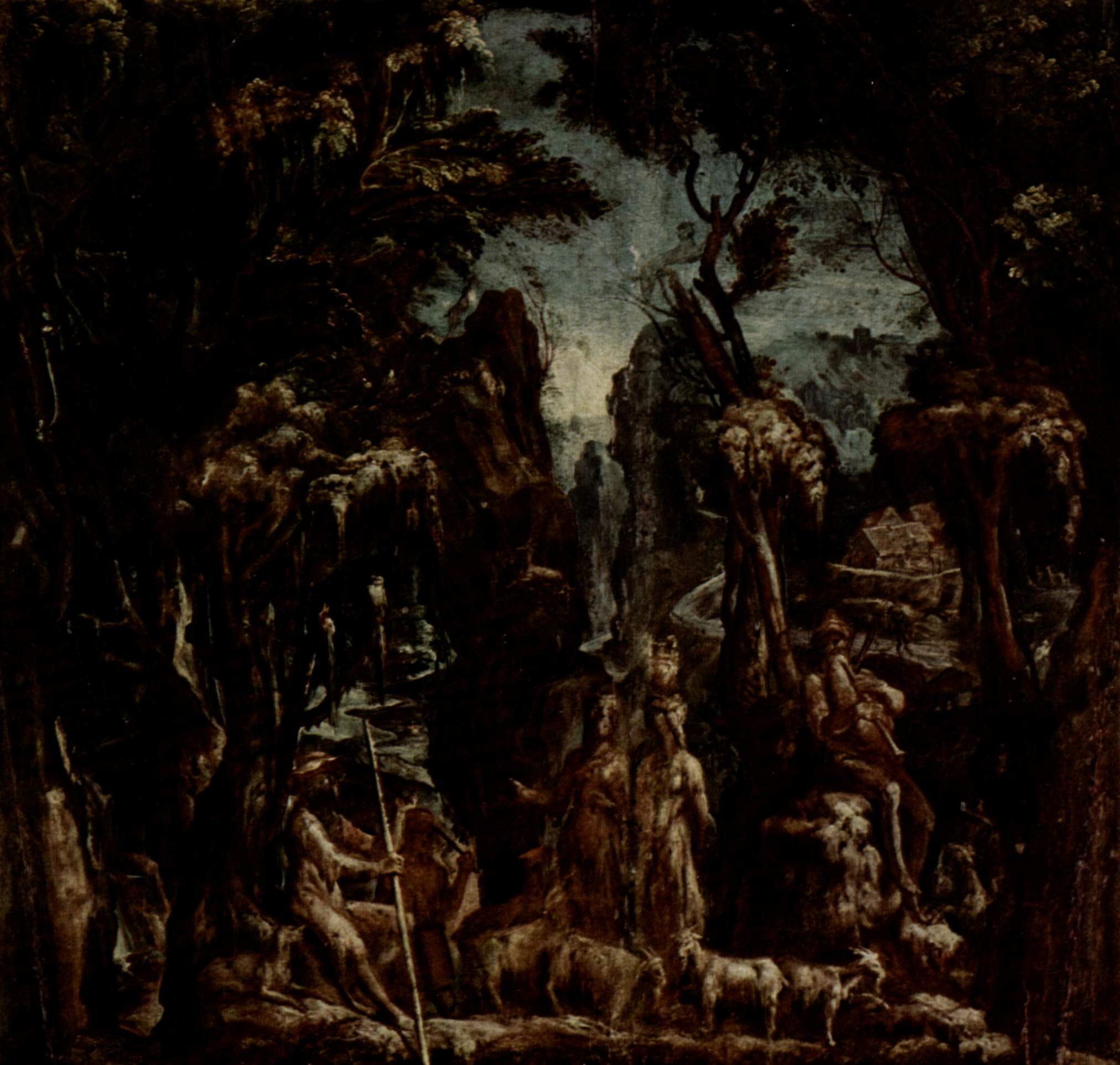
Giacomo Zanguidi, Fantastic landscape, 1570

Jacopo Bertoia, also known as Giacomo Zanguidi or Jacopo Zanguidi or Bertoja, (1544 – ca. 1574), was an Italian painter of a late-Renaissance or Mannerist style that emerged in Parma towards the end of the 16th century.

He was strongly influenced by Parmigianino.

Born in Parma, he studied in Bologna with Sabatini. His masterpiece is the Sala del Bacio, in the Palazzo del Giardino in Parma. He also helped decorate the Sala di Orfeo in the same palace.

In Rome, he was part of the team that frescoed the walls of the Oratorio del Gonfalone in Rome, painting the panel depicting the Entry of Christ into Jerusalem. He was commissioned by Cardinal Alessandro Farnese in 1572–1573 to paint galleries (Sale del Giudizio, della Penitenza, dei Sogni, as well as the Anticamera degli Angeli) of the Villa Farnese in Caprarola, where he replaced the role of Taddeo Zuccari. He had earlier worked in Caprarola with Federico Zuccari in 1574, painting in the Sala di Ercole.
