= Giovanni Boscoli =

Italian sculptor

Giovanni Boscoli (c.1524 – c.1592) was an Italian Renaissance sculptor and architect, also known as Nanni da Montepulciano after his birthplace of Montepulciano. His father Tomaso was also an architect.

He studied under Giorgio Vasari and moved to Parma in 1564 to work for duke Ottavio Farnese, for whom he designed the monumental fountain in front of the Palazzo del Giardino, from which he gained his nickname Giovanni della Fontana. He also designed the 'corridor' at the Palazzo della Pilotta in Parma. Outside the city he designed the villa Carona in Fornovo, the villa Paveri Fontana in Collecchio and the Borgo San Donnino fortifications.

The stucco work on the walls of the room dedicated to Pope Leo X in Leo X Apartments in the Palazzo Vecchio in Florence are attributed to Boscoli and Leonardo Ricciarelli. He also produced a "gilded turtle with a candle" for the salone dei Cinquecento in Palazzo Vecchio. He died in Parma.
