= Amoretti Brothers =

Italian family of type-engravers, printers, mechanics, and blacksmiths

Amoretti
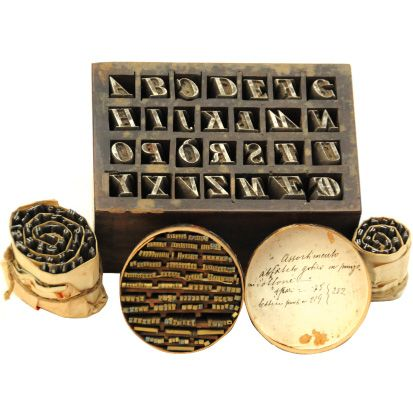
- Country: Reggio-Emilia, Italy
- Origin: San Pancrazio Parmense
- Founded: 18th century
- Traditions: Bodoni's pupils, engravers, inventors and printers
- Dissolution: 19th century, San Pancrazio Parmense

The Amoretti (San Pancrazio Parmense, 18th to 19th centuries) were a family of type-engravers, printers, mechanics, and blacksmiths of the Duchy of Parma. They were initially friends and pupils of the printer Giambattista Bodoni, although they ultimately parted ways with him to establish their own printing house and type foundry in 1791, in direct competition with their mentor.

== The cooperation with Giambattista Bodoni ==
When Bodoni was called to Parma in 1768, several generations of the Amoretti family had been practicing blacksmiths and mechanics in their native hamlet of San Pancrazio Parmense. Their skill was recognized even by the Prime Minister of the Duchy of Parma and Piacenza, Guillaume du Tillot. In 1774, the brothers Pancrazio Amoretti and Giacomo Amoretti received an order from Bodoni to build steel forms to found metal printing types, because the brass ones the printer had commissioned to a watchmaker were losing precision too quickly.

The mandate that Minister Du Tillot stipulated with Bodoni also committed the latter to mentor pupils in the art of printing. The printer noticed Giacomo's skill as a blacksmith and proposed that he begin engraving the punches that Bodoni would later refine.

Andrea Amoretti, the eldest child of Pancrazio, helped his uncle James to engrave the punches and both worked in the type foundry of the Royal Printing House. Andrea independently cut several of Bodoni's punches, including the "Parma" size, the smallest font Bodoni ever proposed and used.

The correspondence between Giambattista and his brother Joseph also provides evidence on the friendship between Bodoni and the Amorettis.

== The disagreement with Bodoni ==
In 1791, the Duke of Parma granted Bodoni permission to open a private printing house and the printer turned to the Amoretti family to manufacture presses, punches, and types for his edition of the Odes of Horace. However, rumors were circulating in Parma that the Amoretti family were not merely skilled craftsmen, but they had also helped Bodoni in designing and inventing his types: Abbot Andrea Mazza, former librarian of the Duchy of Parma, writing to Girolamo Tiraboschi, the librarian of the Duchy of Modena, indicated that the Amoretti family had actively contributed to the formation of Bodoni type and to the beauty of Bodoni's print of Odes of Horace text, an issue which is still the subject of debate among scholars: "I believed too that our brothers [Pancrazio and Giacomo Amoretti] and their sons [don Andrea and his brothers], the punchcutters, were just executors of Bodoni's drawings and at the beginning it was really like that, despite the task of refining the punches was theirs. However, since the typefaces of Bodoni are making even the stars jealous, the credit entirely goes to the Amoretti."

Historians believe that the Amoretti family asked Bodoni to recognize the full scope of their contributions, probably with an acknowledgement of their name on his prints. When he refused, they felt betrayed and broke away from him to open a type foundry and a printing house ("co' caratteri dei Fratelli Amoretti") in San Pancrazio, with the support of part of the Court that disliked the "foreigner" Bodoni. When Bodoni learned of the newly established type foundry, he became furious. Bodoni's feeling of betrayal and mutual recriminations between him and the Amoretti family fostered the rift between the two parties.

The alleged will of Joseph Bodoni, Giambattista's brother, written 3 September 1815, in Saluzzo, states: "If the lawyer acknowledges, with the reason that my brother (Giambattista) was the one who made the types, reply him that Bodoni didn't engrave any type. Those who prepared all the steel pieces to make the punches were Pancratio and James Amoretti, Andrea Amoretti carved those, the assistant James Amoretti tempered those, beat and justified moulds, and Peter Amoretti was the one that made forms for all types' sizes."

== The workshop under Don Andrea ==
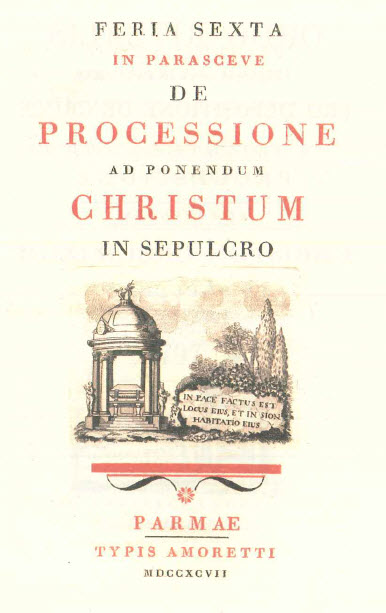
Feria Sexta, Typis Amoretti, 1797

From 1791 to 1795, the Amoretti family — i.e. the brothers Pancrazio, James and Francesco and the children of the first, the so-named "brothers Amoretti" Andrea, John, Peter and Victorinus — built all workshop tools needed to produce characters and subsequently printed and cut the punches of their own alphabet.

The printing activities of the Amoretti began in 1795 with the sonnet The Typography, dedicated to the Duke of Parma Ferdinand I of Bourbon, with another dedicated to Adeodato Turchi, bishop of Parma, on the occasion of his visit to the workshop in San Pancrazio, and other sonnets.

In 1796, they published the Funeral Prayers and Speech on Political Secret of Turchi, which was so similar to Bodoni's editions that it was difficult for experts to distinguish between the creators of the printed editions. In 1797, they published the Feria Sexta in parasceve de processione ad ponendum Christum in sepulcro, a music book printed in red and black.

The masterpiece of the Amoretti printing house was the Sonnets about Harmony by Angelo Mazza, printed 1801 and dedicated to Ludwig I of Bourbon, appointed King of Etruria by Napoleon Bonaparte. The Amoretti family ceased production in 1802: their last printing was a series of works by Giovanni Boccaccio.

Their works were always published with the words "co' caratteri de' Fratelli Amoretti" ("with type of the Amoretti brothers") or "Typis Amoretti", while the news about the opening of this new workshop, competing with that of Bodoni, soon spread throughout Italy and the Amorettis received orders from Parma, Pisa, Genoa, Florence, Livorno, Montefiscone and Bologna, thanks to the elegance of the types that, compared to Bodoni's, were more durable and slightly less costly.

Between 1797 and 1799, Bodoni and the Amoretti were struggling to acquire orders from Milan's National Printing House. When Lorenzo Manini was head of the Milanese workshop, the Amoretti family received requests for large numbers of types and printing presses. Under the supervision of Giambattista Locatelli, who succeeded Lorenzo Manini, Bodoni won the bigger part of the contracts; but each time the creation of Bodoni's typefaces was attributed to the Amoretti, rumours which mainly circulated in Italy and France, the former reacted with anger.

== The foundry under Francesco ==
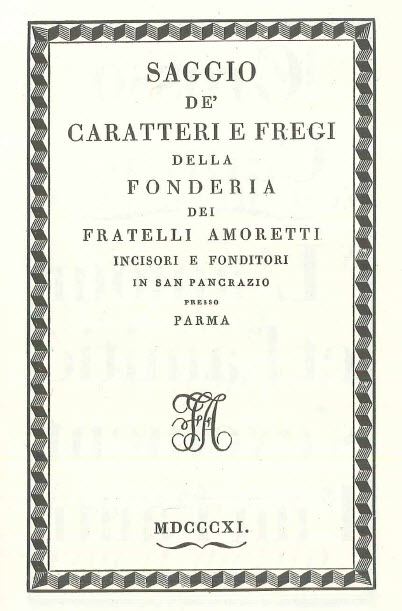
Manual typographical Amoretti brothers, 1811

After the death of Don Andrea in 1807, Francesco Amoretti assumed direction of the workshop. The business of selling types and typography tools (presses, forms, moulds, barrettes, composers, etc.) flourished, as evidenced by reports that French imperial officials relayed to the Parisian Government, regarding the productive activities of Taro, a newly formed administrative area under the Napoleonic regime.

The Saggio de' caratteri e fregi della fonderia dei fratelli Amoretti incisori e fonditori in San Pancrazio presso Parma (transl. Sampler of the typefaces, friezes and decorations, from the foundry of the Amoretti brothers, typecutters and founders, in San Pancrazio by Parma), containing more than 1300 different decorations and characters, was published in 1811. It was followed, after a few years, by the additional Saggio de' fregi della fonderia de' fratelli Amoretti (transl. Sample of friezes from the Amoretti brothers foundry).

These printing catalogues show the work of Don Andrea, "pillar of his family and his workshop," as can be read upon his tombstone.

== Victorinus, transfer to Bologna, and epilogue ==
In 1827, Victorinus remained sole master of the workshop, which was moved from San Pancrazio, an outlying town, to the city of Parma itself where the new, updated catalogue Nuovo saggio de' caratteri e fregi della fonderia dei fratelli Amoretti incisori e fonditori in Parma was published in 1830.

The uprisings of 1830–1831 in Parma led Victorinus Amoretti to accept the enticing invitation of the papal authorities to move the foundry to Bologna. There the printing activities continued as the Amoretti foundry was joined to the Sassi Printing House until 1845, when Victorinus died.

His son Joseph held the company until 1863, when his son-in-law Ferdinand Negroni was called to guide it. In 1880 the last became the sole owner and finally changed the brand name to 'Negroni'; subsequently this company was absorbed by the Nebbiolo Enterprises of Turin at the beginning of the 20th century and in 1924 ceased operations altogether.

In their native San Pancrazio Parmense, on the facade of the house that hosted the old workshop, there is an inscription of Professor Umberto Benassi from 1913, the year of the First Bodoni's Celebration. Restored on 30 November 2013, by the local Cultural Association and the Municipality of Parma, on the occasion of the Second Bodoni's Celebrations, it says: In this house / had workshop and home / the Amoretti / valiant ironsmiths, mechanics / typefounders / Don Andrea Amoretti / worthy typecutting pupil and emulator / of the great Bodoni / created here 1795–1807 / types of rare beauty / master to the brothers John/Peter/Victorinus / James / their paternal uncle / first mayor of this Municipality / from 23 March 1806 / equally distinguished cutter of punches / built here watches of admirable precision / the Municipality and citizens wish to remember these former glories of San Pancrazio / MMXIII

Until the 1970s the entire stretch of Via Emilia through the hamlet was called "Fratelli Amoretti Street" and when the road name was changed to Via Emilia Nazionale, the name "Via Fratelli Amoretti" was transferred to the alley that leads from the Via Emilia to the churchyard of the parish church.

== See also ==
- Font (typography)
- Giambattista Bodoni
- History of Western typography
- Letterpress printing
- List of type designers
- Punch (typography)
- Typeface
- Typesetting

== General bibliography ==
- A. De Pasquale and A. Amoretti, Bodoni e gli Amoretti concorrenti anche a Milano, Parma: Museo Bodoniano, 2013.
- A. De Pasquale, Allievi e antagonisti di Giambattista Bodoni: gli Amoretti di San Pancrazio, Parma: Artegrafica Silva, 2009.
- A. Ciavarella, Una celebre rivalità: i rapporti di bodoni coi fratelli Amoretti di San Pancrazio, "Bollettino del Museo Bodoniano", 4 (1980), pp. 100–104.
- G. Lombardi, Il dissidio di G. B. Bodoni con i suoi migliori allievi: gli Amoretti, «Archivio storico per le Province Parmensi», V (1940), pp. 109–116.
- U. Benassi, Commemorazione di G. B. Bodoni e dei fratelli Amoretti, Parma: Federale, 1913.
