= Bodoni (surname) =

Bodoni is a surname. Notable people with the surname include:

- Gavril Bănulescu-Bodoni (1746–1821), Moldovan clergyman
- Giambattista Bodoni (1740–1813), Italian engraver, publisher and printer, creator of the Bodoni typeface
- Giancarlo Bodoni, American Brazilian jiu-jitsu practitioner
- Zsolt Bodoni (born 1975), Hungarian painter
