= Palazzo del Giardino =

Palace in Parma, Italy

Coordinates: 44.8079°N 10.3223°E

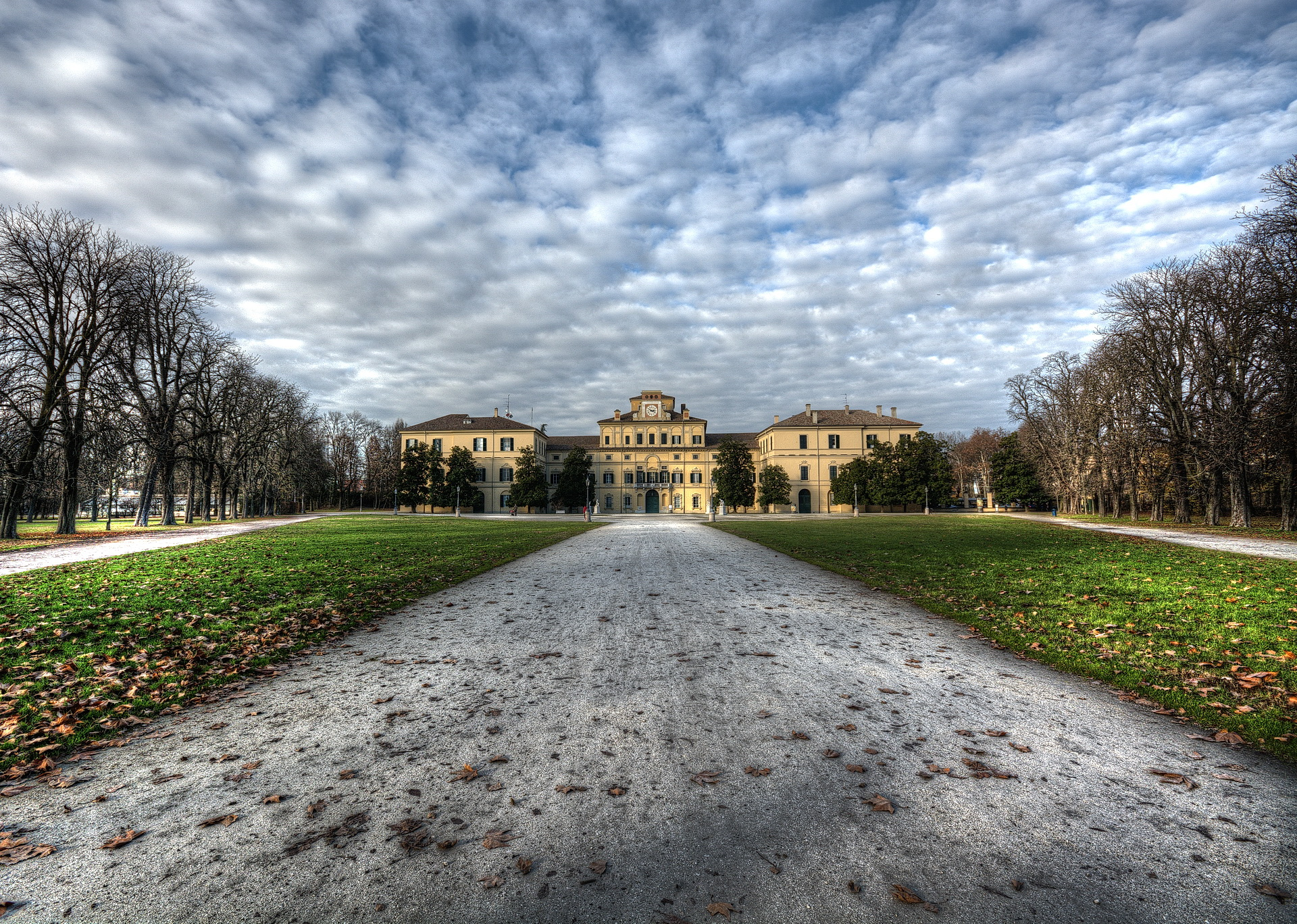
Palazzo del Giardino

The Palazzo del Giardino ("Garden Palace"), also known as the Palazzo Ducale del Giardino ("Ducal Garden Palace"), is a historic building located within the Parco Ducale in Parma.

It should not be confused with the former official residence of the Duke of Parma, built by the House of Farnese, later residence of all the Dukes (including Marie Louise, Duchess of Parma, former Empress of the French and Queen consort of Italy as wife of Napoléon), situated between the Palazzo della Pilotta and the Palazzo della Provincia, in what is now known as piazzale della Pace. The Dukes of Parma also resided at the Ducal Palace of Colorno and the Casino dei Boschi in Sala Baganza.

The main Ducal Palace in Parma—together with the Palazzo della Pilotta and the Reinach Theater—was destroyed during an early morning air raid on 13 May 1944. The attack was carried out by the 781st Squadron of the 465th Heavy Bombardment Group of the United States Air Force, which dropped nine general-purpose bombs on the city centre.

Presently, the Palazzo del Giardino houses Parma's Provincial Carabinieri Command and the Carbinieri's Reparto investigazioni scientifiche (RIS). It is due to house a local office for the European Food Safety Authority.

== History ==
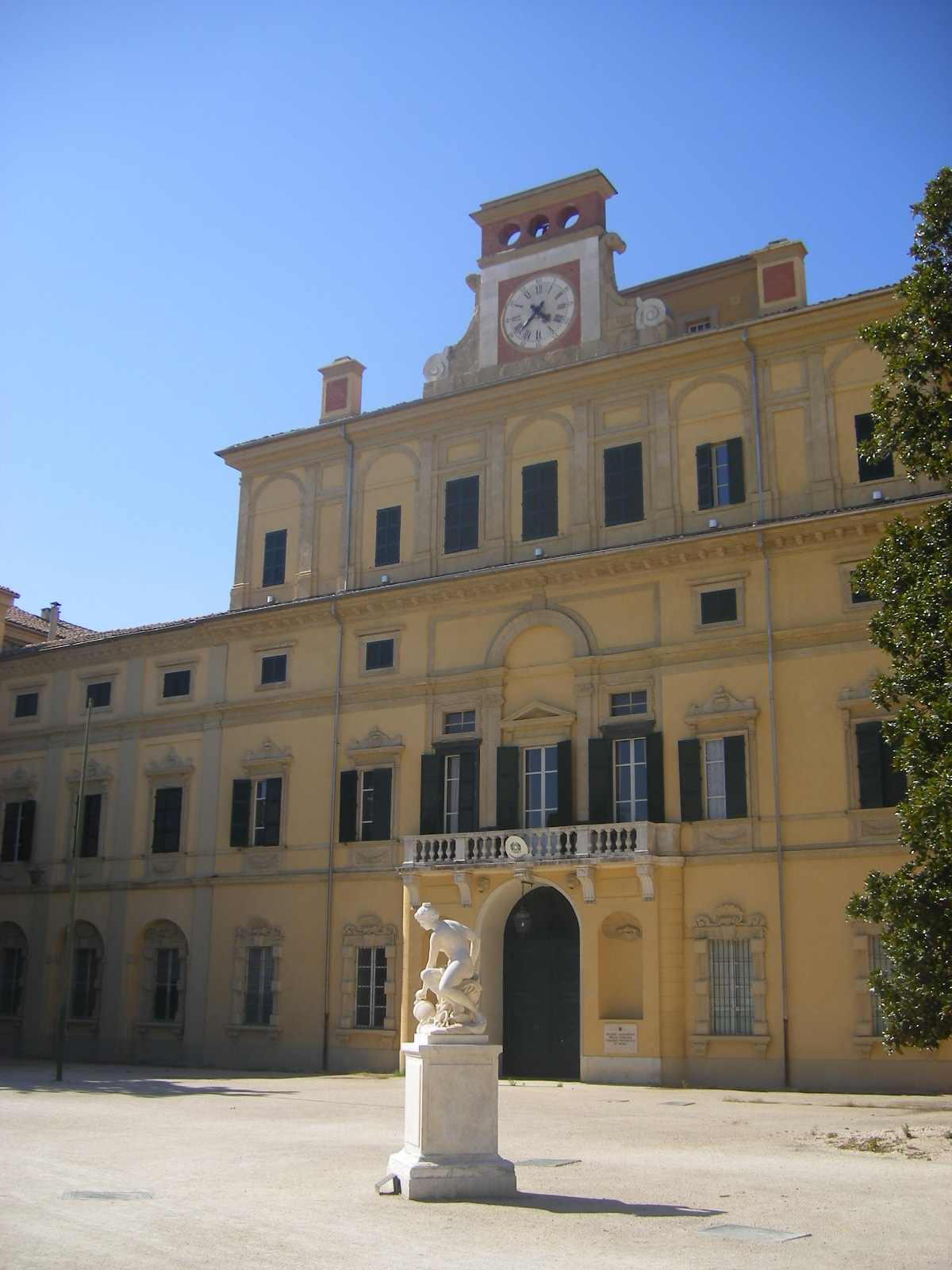
Façade

Construction of a palace on the site was commissioned in 1561 by Duke Ottavio Farnese, who needed a permanent seat for the court of the Duchy of Parma and Piacenza. He selected a plot adjacent to an existing defensive turret designed by the Sforza. Jacopo Barozzi was appointed to design the new building, while Giovanni Francesco Testa oversaw its construction. The layout and façades drew inspiration from other Farnese residences of the period, notably the Palazzo Farnese in Rome and the Villa Farnese at Caprarola.

The palace interiors were richly decorated by a circle of late-Renaissance and early-Baroque artists: Girolamo Mirola, Jacopo Zanguidi (known as "il Bertoja"), Agostino Carracci, Carlo Cignani, Jan Soens, Cesare Baglioni, Giovanni Battista Trotti (known as "il Malosso") and Luca Reti.

Early in the 17th century the building was enlarged. First Simone Moschino added new courtyards, and then Girolamo Rainaldi extended the wings on either side of the original rectangular plan.

Giovanni Boscoli designed a large fountain in front of the new palace, featuring multiple statues and elaborate water displays. In a letter to Pico della Mirandola, Vitellozzo Vitelli argued that Boscoli's fountain was superior to the one at the Palazzo Farnese in Caprarola.

The Palazzo del Giardino reached its height of splendour under Ranuccio I Farnese but fell into neglect during the reign of his son, Odoardo I Farnese, who was preoccupied with military campaigns. The ducal court continued to use the palace until the second half of the 17th century, when they shifted their residence to other buildings around the Palazzo della Pilotta.

In the 1680s and 1690s, Duke Ranuccio II Farnese initiated extensive renovations of both the palace and its gardens. These late-17th-century works were largely based on designs by the French architect Ennemond Alexandre Petitot, who also ordered the demolition of Boscoli's original fountain after it became insanitary.

After Italian unification, the palace was used as an infantry training school. It suffered severe damage during an air raid in the Second World War.

On 9 September 1943, the school's commander, Colonel Gaetano Ricci, refused German demands to surrender. A battle ensued, which the Germans won after deploying armoured vehicles. Five Italian soldiers were killed and twenty wounded; their sacrifice is now commemorated by a marble plaque on the building.

Following the battle, the palace was left unguarded and vulnerable to vandalism, and by the end of the war it had been heavily devastated. Although the building was later repurposed as the base for the Carabinieri's Comando della Legione, post-war reconstruction efforts were delayed by bureaucratic obstacles. Work on the completely destroyed south-west wing did not begin until 1959 and was only completed in 1968.

Several restoration and improvement projects have taken place since 2004, some of them funded by the national lottery.

== Artworks ==
On the ground floor are works by the early 17th-century artist Cesare Baglioni. A monumental 17th-century staircase leads to a large salone on the first floor, named the Sala degli Uccelli after its stucco and fresco decoration of 224 species of birds by Benigno Bossi. Other rooms open off this salone - they house various frescoes and stucco-work from the Farnese era:

- Sala di Alcina - The oldest room in the palace, with circa 1568 frescoes by Girolamo Mirola, with collaboration from Jacopo Zanguidi, showing scenes from book VI of Orlando Furioso
- Sala dell'Aetas Felicior (or "Sala del Bacio") - Fresco by Zanguidi, 1570–1573, with scenes of Venus and Cupid; named after the Latin inscription Aetas Felicior on the freize running along the ceiling and the dancing scene with a kiss (bacio) glimpsed among crystal columns, a typical creation of late Mannerism, where the space is exploited as a means of naturalistic illusion.
- Sala d'Orfeo - Frescoes by Mirola and Zanguidi, 1568–1570, with scenes of the love story of Orpheus between architectonic figures.
- Sala di Erminia - Frescoes by the Bolognese artist Alessandro Tiarini, 1628, with scenes from Gerusalemme liberata and stucco work of tangled branches by Carlo Bossi.
- Sala dell'Amore - Ceiling frescoes by Agostino Carracci showing maternal love (Venus looking at her son Aeneas as he heads for Italy), heavenly love (Venus and Mars) and human love (Peleus and Thetis); he died in 1602, leaving the work to be completed in 1679–80 by Carlo Cignani with other scenes on the theme of love.
- Sala delle Leggende - The window side of the room shows two frescoes by the Flemish artist Jan Soens, whilst the other three sides have 1604–1619 frescoes by Giovan Battista Trotti (Jupiter Crowning Bacchus, Accompanied by Venus, The Sacrifice of Alcestis and Circe Turning Ulysses' Companions Back Into Men).
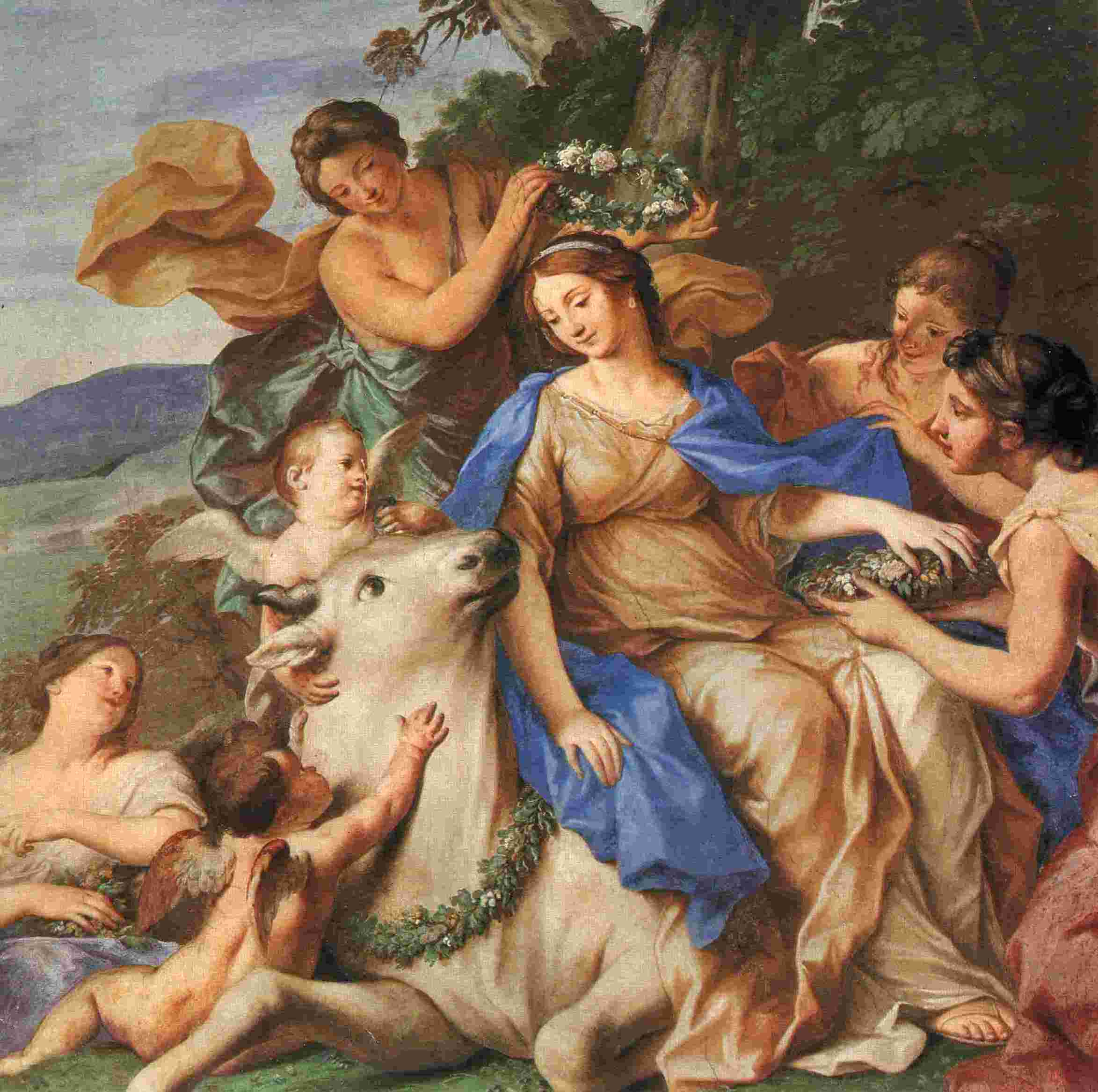
Carlo Cignani, Rape of Europa (detail).

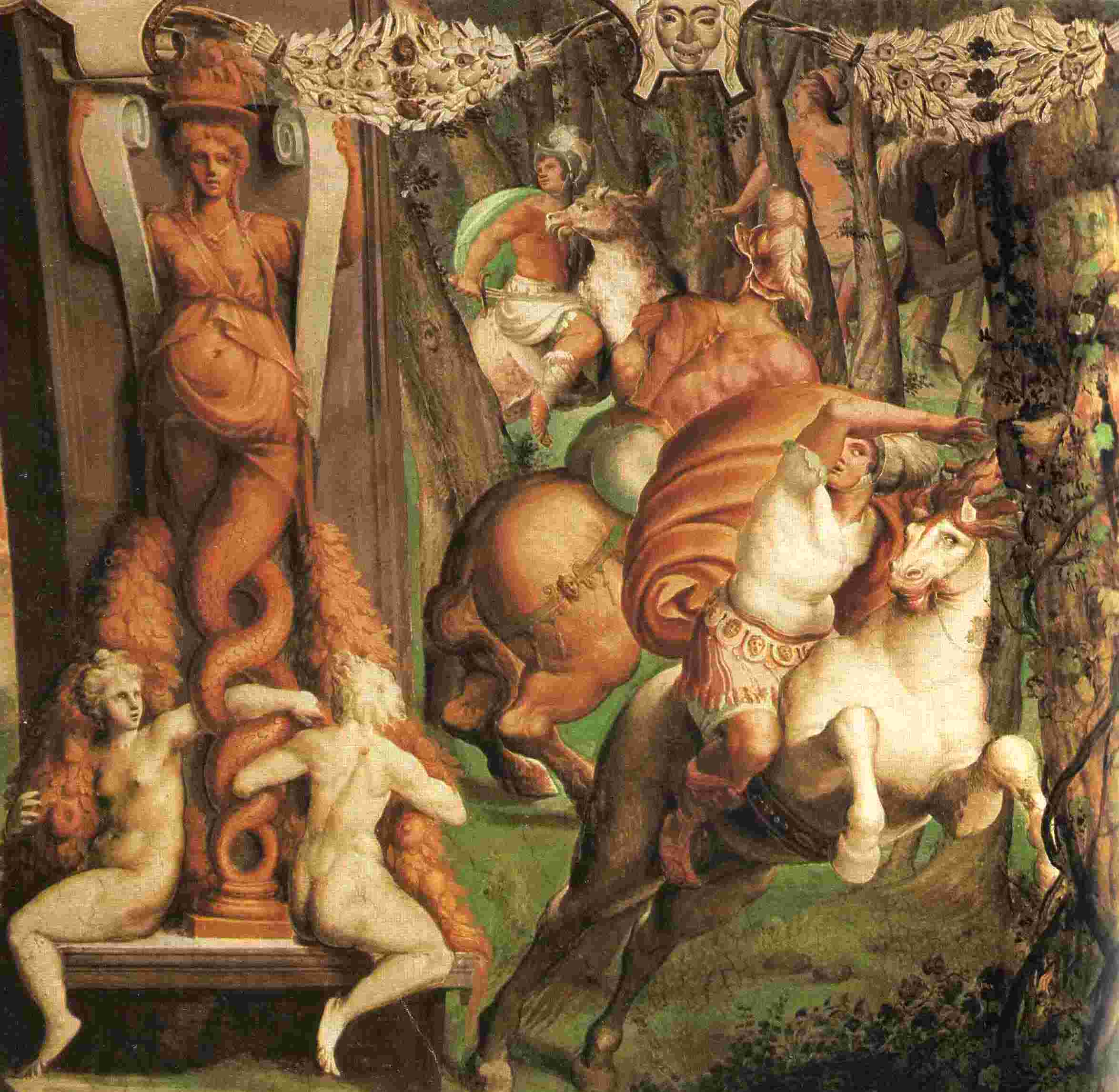
Jacopo Zanguidi, fresco in Sala dell'Aetas Felicior (detail).

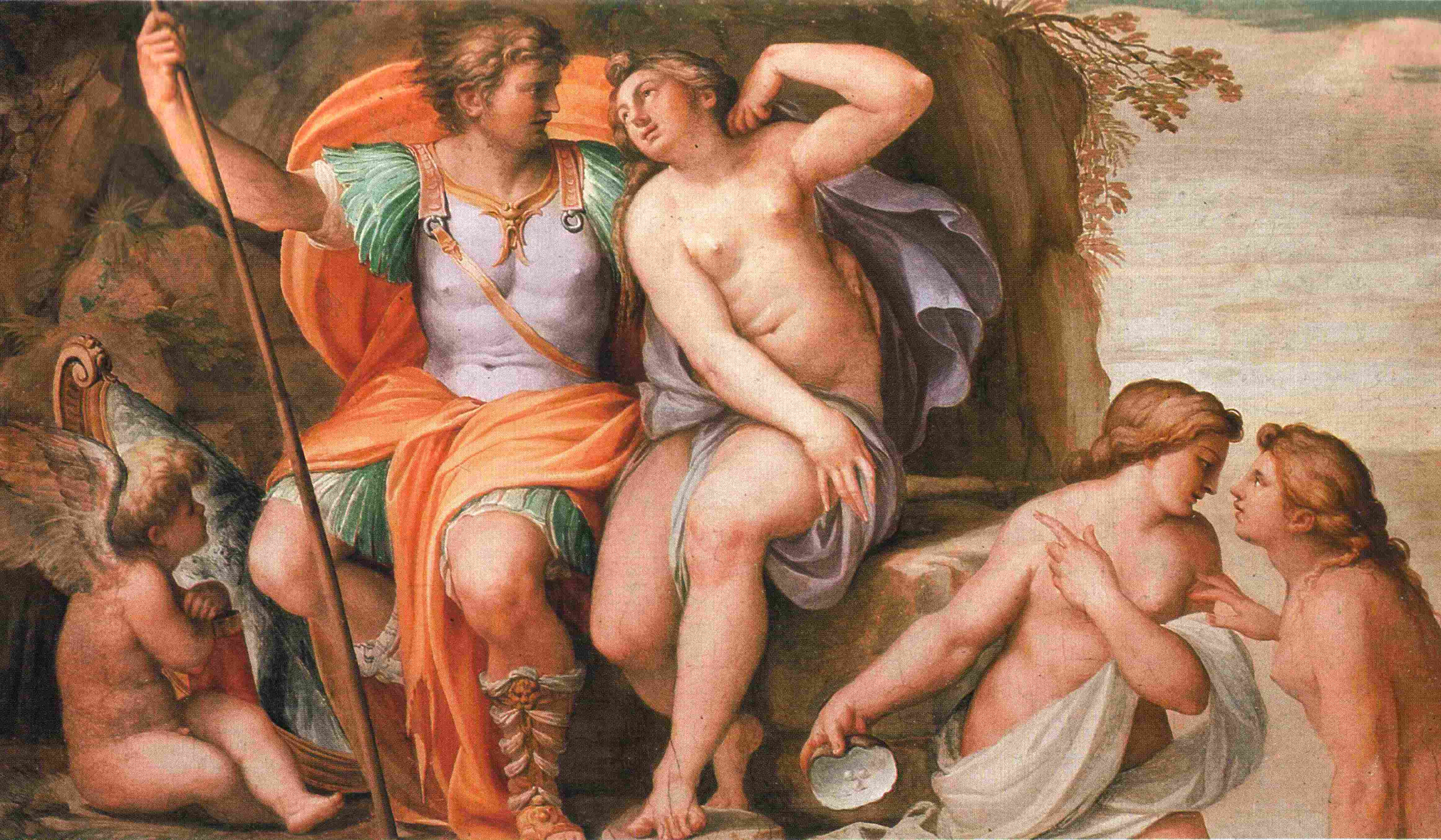
Agostino Carracci, Venus and Mars.

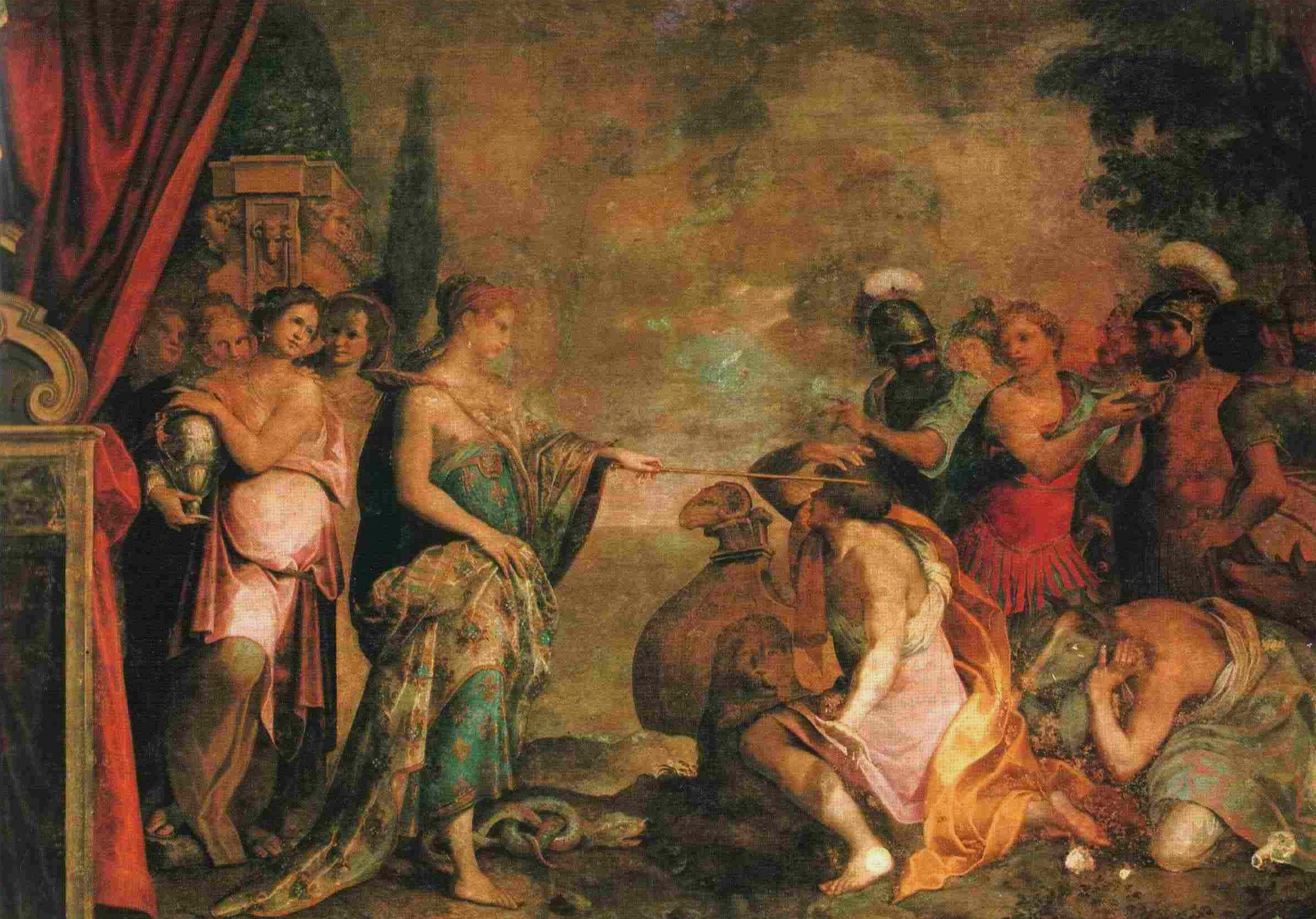
Giovan Battista Trotti, Circe Turning Ulysses' Companions Back Into Men.

== Bibliography ==
- (in Italian) Dante Zucchelli e Renzo Fedocci, Il Palazzo Ducale di Parma, Artegrafica Silva, Parma 1980

== See also ==
- Ducal Palace of Colorno
- Ducal Palace of Parma
- Palazzo della Pilotta
- Palazzo di Riserva
