= Bodoni Museum =

Printing museum in Parma, Italy

Coordinates: 44.80456°N 10.32597°E

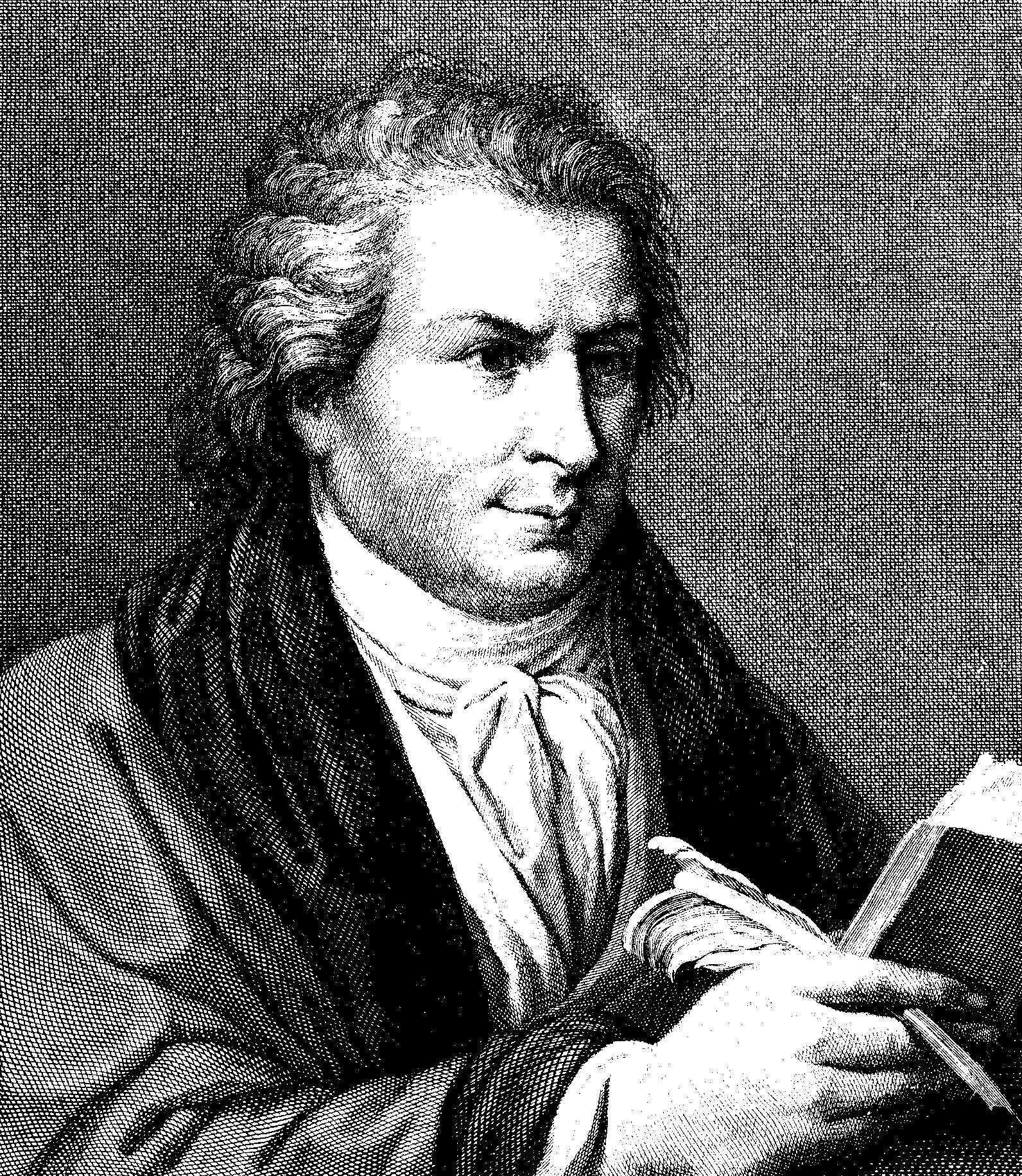
Giambattista Bodoni

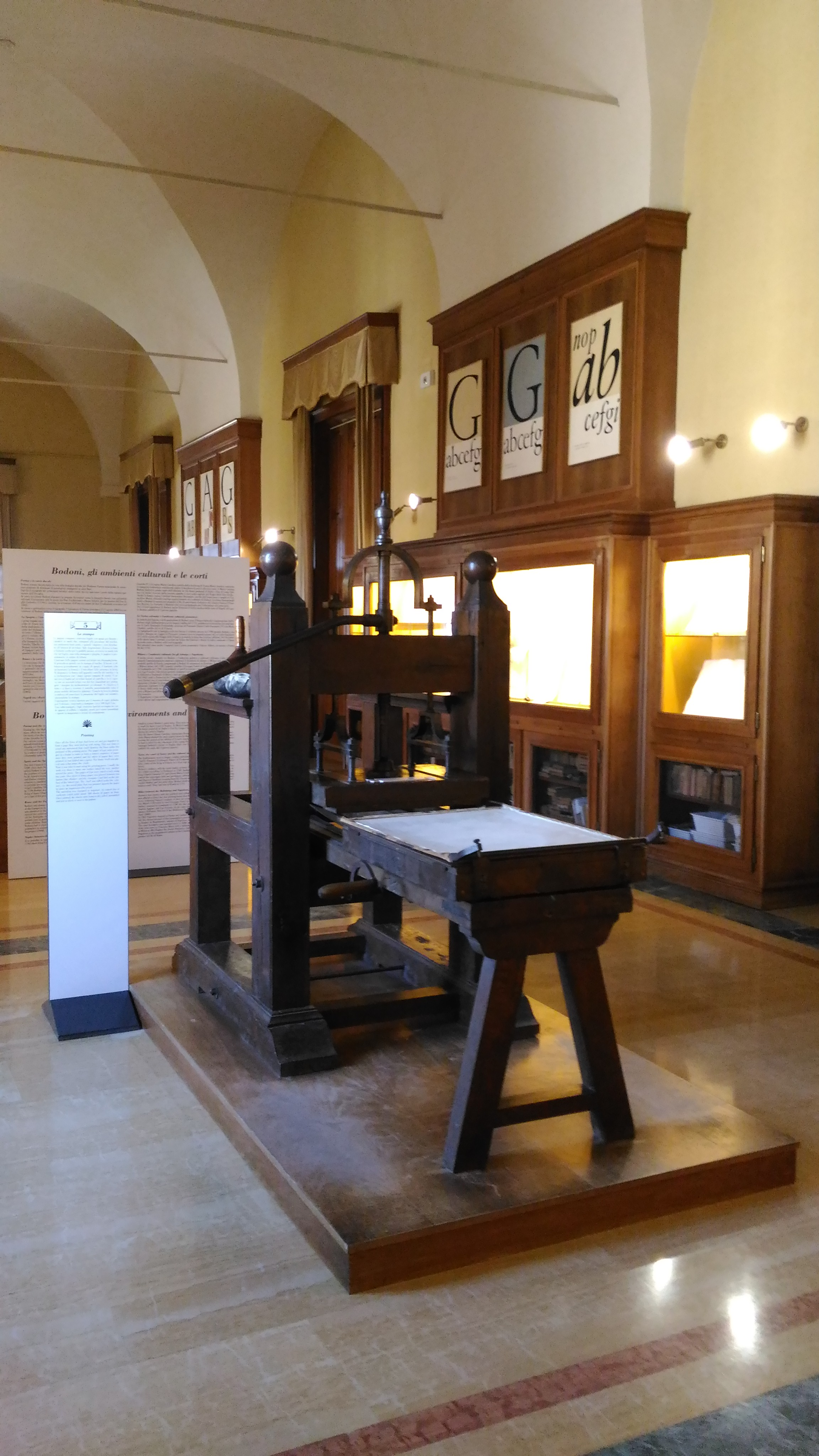
Museum Bodoniano

The Bodoni Museum of Parma is a museum dedicated to Giambattista Bodoni (1740–1813), situated in the Palazzo della Pilotta building on the premises of the Palatina Library.

The museum's treasure is composed of thousands of volumes, a rich correspondence and various typographic tools of Bodoni's Printing Office. The collection dedicated to the history of the book, comprising both manuscripts and the printed editions, constitutes one of the museum's most prestigious sections.

The concept of a museum hosting the treasures of Bodoni's Printing Office dates back to 1940. The material, rescued from the bombardment that destroyed the Palatina Library during the Second World War, was finally assembled and displayed in the museum in 1963.

After an intense phase of activity and research, the museum struggled between 1983 and 1999, being repeatedly refinanced and reopened. In 2004 the museum joined the Association of European Printing Museums and in 2005 entered the Governing Council of the Associazione Italiana dei Musei della Stampa e della carta (A.I.M.S.C.).
