= Citadel of Parma =

Fortress in Parma, Italy

- Parma, Emilia-Romagna in Italy
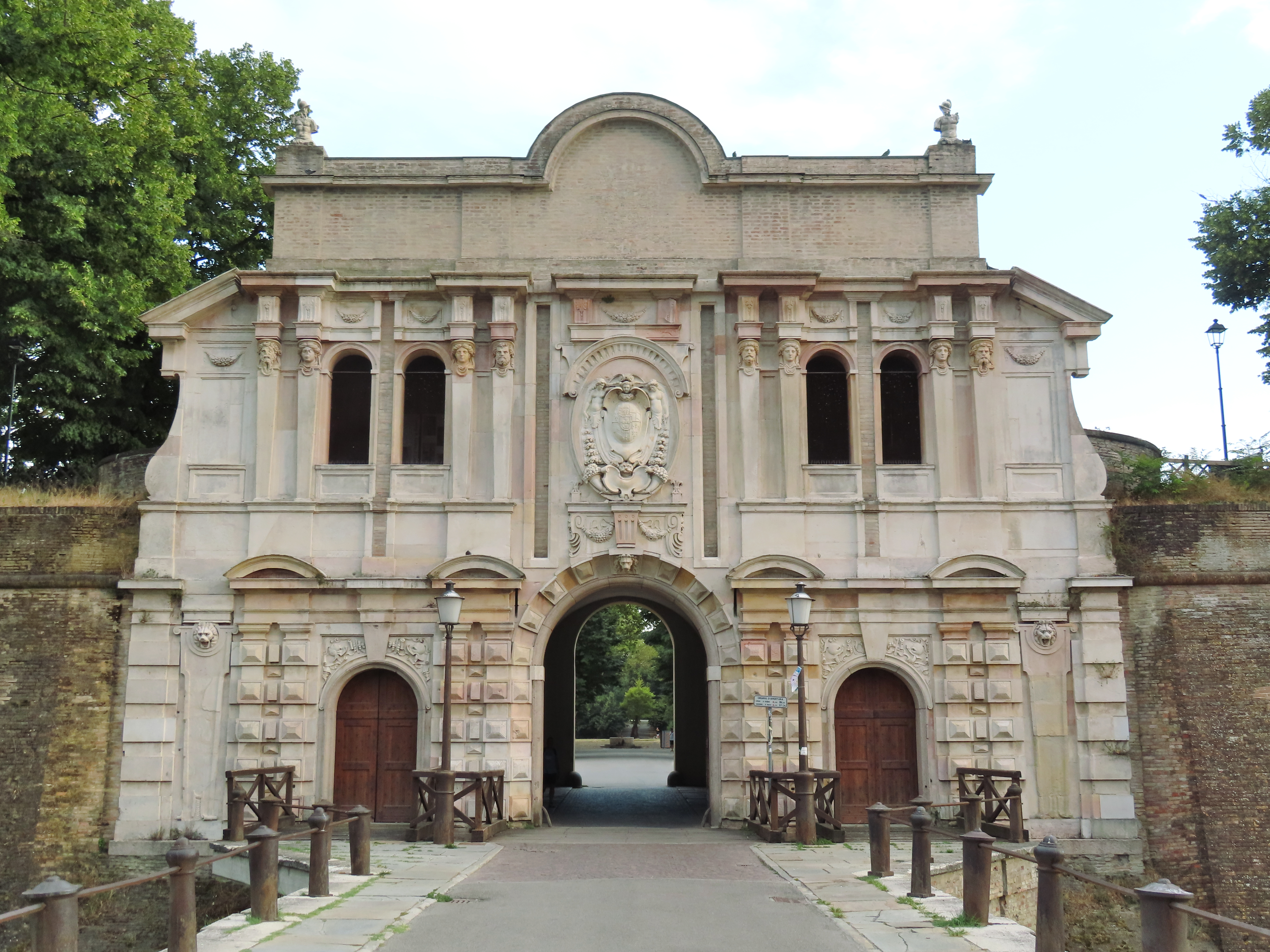
- Monumental gate

Site information
- Type: Military citadel
- Owner: Municipality of Parma
- Open to the public: Yes
- Condition: Public park

Location
- Coordinates: 44°47′36″N 10°19′52″E

Site history
- Built: 1591 under Duke Alessandro Farnese - 1599 under Duke Ranuccio I Farnese
- Built by: Duke Alessandro Farnese
- Materials: Brick

The Citadel of Parma (Italian: Cittadella di Parma) is a pentagonal fortress built in the Emilian city in the last years of the 16th century.

The structure was erected at the behest of the Duke of Parma and Piacenza Alessandro Farnese and entrusted to the engineers Giovanni Antonio Stirpio de' Brunelli and Genesio Bresciani with the collaboration of Smeraldo Smeraldi. To build it, the Maggiore canal was diverted, whose course was joined with that of the Comune canal up to the Porta Nuova (today's Barriera Farini).

Created for defensive purposes, and for this reason equipped with ramparts and moats, it was later used as barracks, as a prison for political crimes and as a place for executions. Between the late 20th and early 21st centuries, the fortress, which retains its original pentagonal shape, was renovated and used as a public park, with spaces dedicated to sports and children's activities.

The structure has five bastions. The main entrance, characterized by a monumental facade in Angera stone, is to the north, while the other, the Porta del Soccorso, is to the south. The main entrance gate, designed by Simone Moschino and built by Giambattista Carra in 1596, has been preserved without later modifications.

== History ==
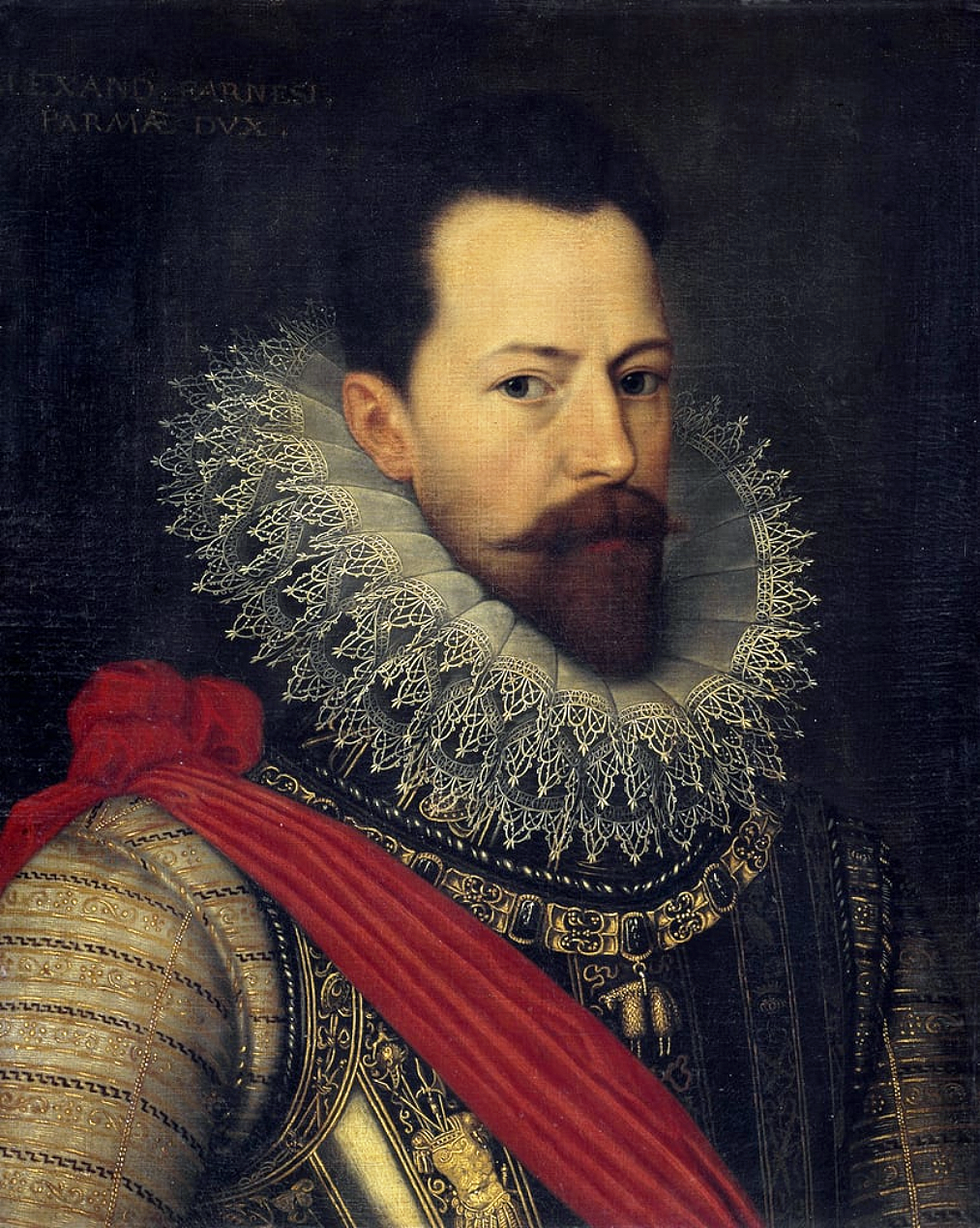
Alessandro Farnese in a portrait by Otto Venius (ca. 1585).

=== Historical context and site selection ===
Alessandro Farnese, who in his youth had the opportunity to learn from his father Ottavio the art of war and from the duchy's commissioner of war and artillery Francesco De Marchi (1504–1576) the principles of fortifications, decided in 1589 to build one in Parma, even though he was convinced that "the loyalty of a city was obtained not by building citadels, but by pulling them down." It was the duke himself who drew the outline of the fortress, who drew inspiration for its design from the one built by Francesco Paciotto in Antwerp. On whether he would have his plans followed to the letter, the duke was adamant, so much so that he prevented his son Ranuccio from intervening in its realization. The Citadel thus became a symbol of Parma's renewal, surpassing in prestige the Parco Ducale built by Ottavio Farnese precisely to give it greater dignity than other cities, including Piacenza.

However, upon the death of Pope Paul III, the Papal States abandoned their favorable attitude toward the construction of the Citadel. (Note: On November 20, 1589, Ranuccio wrote to his father to warn him of the situation, speaking of "some speeches that are being made in Parma on behalf of the new Castle that someone is putting into consideration that Your Highness cannot build the said Castle without license from the Pope...." On March 12, 1590 Alexander replied, "The Pope's inclination, tending more and more every day to show at our house the little will he holds, it seems to me that we should put our hand to it as soon as possible..." In Archivio di Stato di Parma (ASP), Governo Farnesiano, Fabbriche ducali e fortificazioni, busta n°3, Castello di Parma.) The duke nevertheless decided to proceed with the construction, partly in light of the tension with neighboring states and to resist possible invasions. Nonetheless, the Citadel was never used for defensive purposes and was soon converted into a prison, causing speculation that the duke had conceived it as a repressive tool.

In order to choose the site for the fortress, the conformation of the land was studied, looking for land that could provide materials to build it, (Note: Zorzi and Morosini drafted a report in October 1598 at the end of the inspection: "The quality of the soil is excellent, being very tenacious and chalky; which also brings great convenience, since the ditch itself comes to supply the material for making the stones..." In ASP, coll. cit., envelope no. 3.) and the arrangement of the surrounding waterways, so as to facilitate the operation of the moats. The choice thus fell on the southern part of the city, between Porta Nuova and the Stradella rampart.

The Antwerp fortress was reproduced to scale, with a smaller size due to reasons probably related to limited financial resources or location. The fortress was thus leaned against the walls, causing work to begin close to the Renaissance perimeter of the city. To follow the project, however, the bastions of Stradella and Porta Nuova were torn down. The latter, commissioned by Ottavio Farnese in 1573, was rebuilt along the perimeter of the new walls. (Note: The "Note of the orders given to me Smeraldo by S.m Gio. Ant.o on September 30, 1591" read, "All the city walls, the Bastion of the Hermits, the platform of S. Cristoforo with all the wall up to the front of the castle gate should be repaired..." The indication, also reported in the "memorial" that Stirpio delivered to Smeraldi, was later declined in detail by the Deputies to the Reparation, who arranged to "have the bastion of the Stradella of this city destroyed for the benefit of the said building, and from the said Bastion all the following wall, beginning from the said bastion and coming up to half of the bastion of Porta Nova..." Letter dated October 17, 1591, Municipal Archives, envelope 754.)

=== The long debate on the shape of the fortress ===
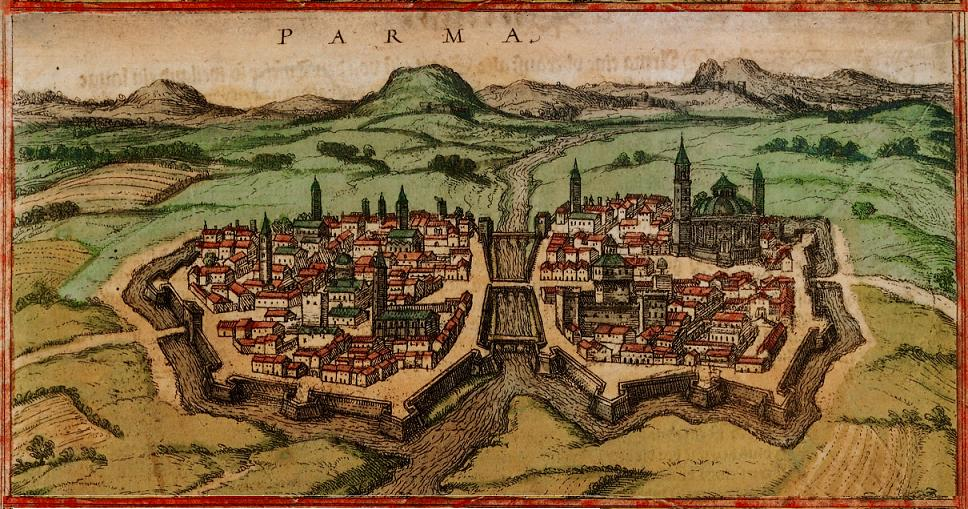
Sixteenth-century map of the city of Parma in the early days of the duchy.

The choice of the pentagonal shape adopted for the citadel of Parma has its roots in the long debate that took place during the 15th and 16th centuries about what was the right number of bastions to give the structure for better defensibility for strategic purposes. The maintenance of a radiocentric shape, consistent with the Renaissance conception of the city, and the pursuit of features of extreme functionality of the complex were the two main causes that led to the choice of the pentagonal shape for the construction of citadels. The study of fortifications, in which every single technical-geometric element is carefully dosed in order to achieve the most suitable shape and size, sees the maintenance of a physical centrality as a necessary element to be able to reconcile and mold the shape of the fortress with the characteristics of the surrounding territory. Hence the choice of a five-sided, elongated shape rather than an equilateral one. In the second half of the century, after several realizations, the pentagonal shape would be chosen, as in the Fortezza da Basso in Florence (1533) and the Cittadella Farnesiana in Piacenza (1547), designed by Antonio da Sangallo the Younger.

Sangallo's signature feature, found in the palace-fortress of Caprarola, lies in his ability to combine aesthetics and functionality, civil and military architecture. With the passage of time, it is possible to note the improvement of military town planning in the sixteenth century, as evidenced also by the outer wall of Castel Sant'Angelo, designed by Francesco Laparelli and begun in 1562. Moreover, although the search for precise geometries is noticeable, it is possible to observe a desire to abandon a certain formal closure in favor of a figurative openness toward the medieval structure and the study of urban structure marked by the presence of the river.

=== Construction of the Citadel and consequences ===
The construction of the Citadel entailed several non-negligible consequences for the city of Parma, both environmentally, socially and economically. First of all, the enormous space required for the construction of the complex, together with the need to keep the outer perimeter of the structure (the so-called tagliate) free, so as not to leave any possible shelters for the enemy in case of siege, led to the demolition of numerous buildings, from the simple dwellings of the population to the highest level buildings up to even religious ones. The urban structure of the city was affected quite a bit, even in the following centuries; likewise, the very role of the city itself was also profoundly altered, with an anticipation of the city's later urban and economic decline, similar to what also happened in Antwerp, where the entrenchment of military units within the citadel caused such tension that it drove away trade, thus displacing markets and financial transfers, contributing therefore to the city's impoverishment.

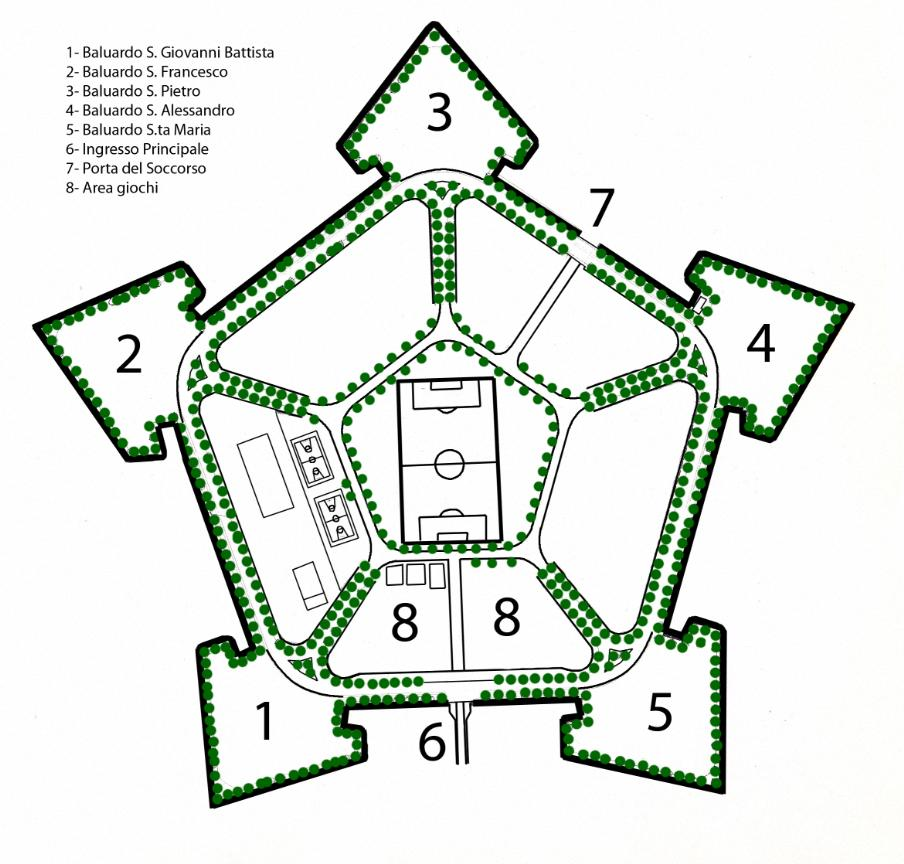
Planimetry of the Citadel of Parma.

==== The gates ====
The citadel historically had only two entrances, located one in the northern part of the complex, facing the city, and the other in the southern part, facing what was then the countryside. The entrance facing the city was crowned by a gate of monumental character, while the one facing the outside was called the "Relief Gate." Consistent with what is reported in a notarial act of 1596, the design of the main gate was said to have been conceived by Simone Moschino, in line with the criteria for the construction of monumental entrances to cities or citadels in the 16th century. (Note: In Saccardi's deed of August 29, 1596, Carra "undertakes to give all the stones that will be needed, and to work according to the design made by Mr. Simone Moschino, consistent with the parts and measures below declared." In Adorni (2008, p. 177).) The gate stands today without its original appearance being substantially affected, except for the upper part, made of brick, the only modification made over time. The construction time of this gate was rather long: when completed, it turned out to be divided into three bays communicating through a series of rooms intended for the guard and control units; on the upper floor, meanwhile, was located the castellan's dwelling, spaced from the facade by means of a corridor leading to the observation posts. The original plan also called for the installation of four embrasures, which were never really integrated into the structure. The "Relief Gate," by contrast, underwent substantial reconstruction in the aftermath of World War II, thus appearing much simpler and more approximate when compared to the original design, which saw it enriched by more refined and complex designs, with granite moldings and the two monumental cannons placed to the side of the entrance.

==== The works ====
Work on the construction of the citadel began in 1591, under the supervision of the ducal engineer Giovanni Antonio Stirpio de' Brunelli. (Note: For more details see Vincenzo Banzola (1973). Giovanni Antonio Stirpio de' Brunelli da Busseto ingegnere ed architetto militare di Alessandro Farnese. Parma: Tipolitografia Benedettina.) Prince Ranuccio, on the other hand, personally took care of the financial aspect, while Count Cosimo Tagliaferri, "doctor of laws," attended to the administrative part. However, since Duke Alessandro was in Flanders at the time of the construction, it is not certain whether or not Ranuccio faithfully followed the directives left to him by his father. On the other hand, some documents attest to the difficulties related to some problems that arose during the construction of the citadel, which prolonged the construction time beyond what was expected. First of all, already at the beginning of the works, a substantial disagreement emerged between Brunelli and the ducal officials, who imposed restrictions related to the construction time. (Note: In a letter dated 17 August 1590, the Duke ordered "that the work be begun as soon as possible and that it be carried out with such speed and order that it will be visible in the defences and that the guard and artillery will be in place in a few days, so that if anyone had thought of disturbing us, not only could they not do it, but they would not be able to do it in time [...]" In ASP, coll. cit., envelope no. 3.) In addition, the meddling of Alessandro Farnese's administrators caused several problems in the technical sphere as well: this led to a long series of mutual accusations between those in charge of the project, as attested in the two letters sent by the ducal secretary Pico to Duke Alessandro in which, in addition to strongly expressing the intention of wanting to equip the fortress with guards and artillery, Brunelli is basically accused.

Seeking at all costs to complete the work, he did not hesitate to make decisions discordant with the will of the city community and, at times, of Alessandro himself. Disagreements between Brunelli and the administrators grew as time went on, to the point that it became a recurring practice, in order to discredit his opponent, to deliberately allow him to make design mistakes. (Note: In a letter to Cardinal Odoardo, Governor Ceserini writes: "[...] Stirpio is so much at odds with these engineers, and the engineers and commissioners and superior ministers are also so much at odds with him, that it is impossible that work can be done, and (what is worse) there is competition on one side and the other that the partner makes a mistake..." 3 February 1592.) In this climate, it ended up that in 1592 Brunelli was sent back to Flanders on the express order of the duke, who appointed Bresciani in his place, joined by Smeraldo Smeraldi, thus stabilizing the situation. (Note: On 30 July 1592, Ranuccio wrote to his father: "As far as the Castle is concerned, it is in a very good state of repair, but it is being worked on slowly, since there are no more than six hundred people due to a lack of money. The ramparts, particularly those on the squares and those that look towards the Porta di San Micheli, are showing many cracks, and I doubt that it was easy to maintain them this winter. The disorder came from the lack of diligence that was put into making them, but Genese is repairing them as best he can. [...]")

Smeraldo Smeraldi is credited with many designs of the fortress. Stirpio himself drew on his expertise by providing solutions to various problems with particular effort. Among Smeraldi's most important designs are: the plan of the fortress (which includes measurements of some of its elements), a survey of the outline of the Citadel and the city walls, and a section of the moats and ramparts.

From the beginning, the construction of the Citadel required a huge financial effort, inevitably attracting various interests throughout the area. Alessandro intended to entrust his household with the economic burden of building the fortress; moreover, the realization of such an ambitious project at the same time gave employment to many citizens, (Note: In 1591 there were about three thousand people on the site, including women and children. In Papagno (1982).) and this also unintentionally contributed to limiting the riots that arose during the periods of major famine. However, several frauds occurred during the course of the work, concerning very often the quality of the materials, sometimes really bad, or the labor, with work being sloppy or even not performed. Such events fell under indictment on both Stirpio and Smeraldi.

=== Subsequent transformations and problems ===
Over the centuries the Citadel underwent several transformations. The first were arranged by the dukes Odoardo and Ranuccio II Farnese, who decided on the restoration of the walls and the strengthening of the arsenals, as well as increasing the armaments for its defense. Their successors Francesco and Antonio, on the other hand, limited themselves to perfecting the defensive system and the internal control system, but did not intervene massively. The refinement, however, proved to be in vain: after Antonio's death, the Citadel was stormed by several foreign powers, and during this period leaded guardhouses were installed on the ramparts, underground guardhouses were organized ready to counterattack the enemy from ten sorties, facilities were built to house the military, and a house was built for the priest. Warehouses for use in case of siege and prisons were also built inside the Citadel. In the castellan's apartment next to the entrance, guardhouses equipped with five batteries of cannons were installed.

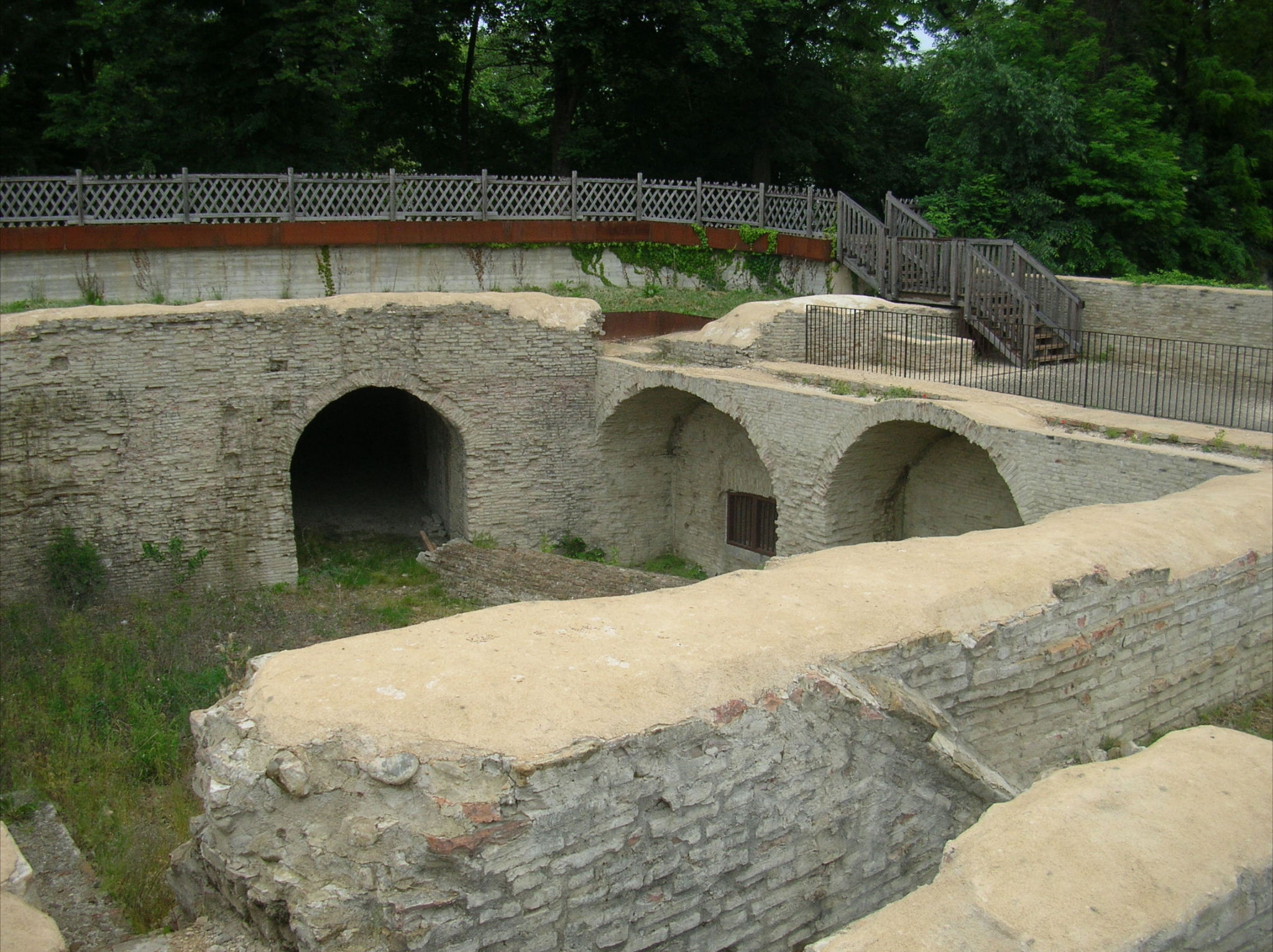
Restoration of the Santa Maria Bastion at the Citadel of Parma.

In 1747, on the other hand, it was a survey by engineer Borelli that raised the need for interventions on the ramparts and curtains: conservation defects were found in the faces of the Bastions of San Francesco, Sant'Alessandro, Santa Maria and San Giovanni and in the curtain between the latter two. The scholar Emilio Casa, who discussed the condition of the Citadel from 1734 to the duchy of Charles III, also described a building, probably a cult building: its existence is also confirmed by the oldest maps of the Citadel.

In the 19th century, some ramparts collapsed and were rebuilt, thus the occasion was taken to raise the walls and make them less easy to storm. Between 1842 and 1859, moreover, two barracks and a warehouse reserved for artillery and trailing materials were built in the fortress, effectively transforming the Citadel from a defensive structure into a barracks, a function to which it had in fact been permanently destined since the Treaty of Aachen in 1748, except for the Napoleonic interlude (1802–1814) and the first part of the second Habsburg rule over the Duchy. During the rule of Marie Louise and Adam Neipperg the fortress housed an infantry regiment and its parades.

Starting in 1818, the Citadel became home to the Military College, which was later renamed the Military School and relocated. Subsequently, the fortress underwent significant modifications: Charles-René de Bombelles had a barracks built there that was higher than the walls, and Charles III had a drawbridge and some trenches built, which – combined with the continuous transit of artillery pieces and military units – earned it the new name arranged by Charles III, "War Square." The last changes were finally made after World War II: first the barracks were demolished and then, as a result of the city's expansion, the moat was reduced.

=== 21st century ===
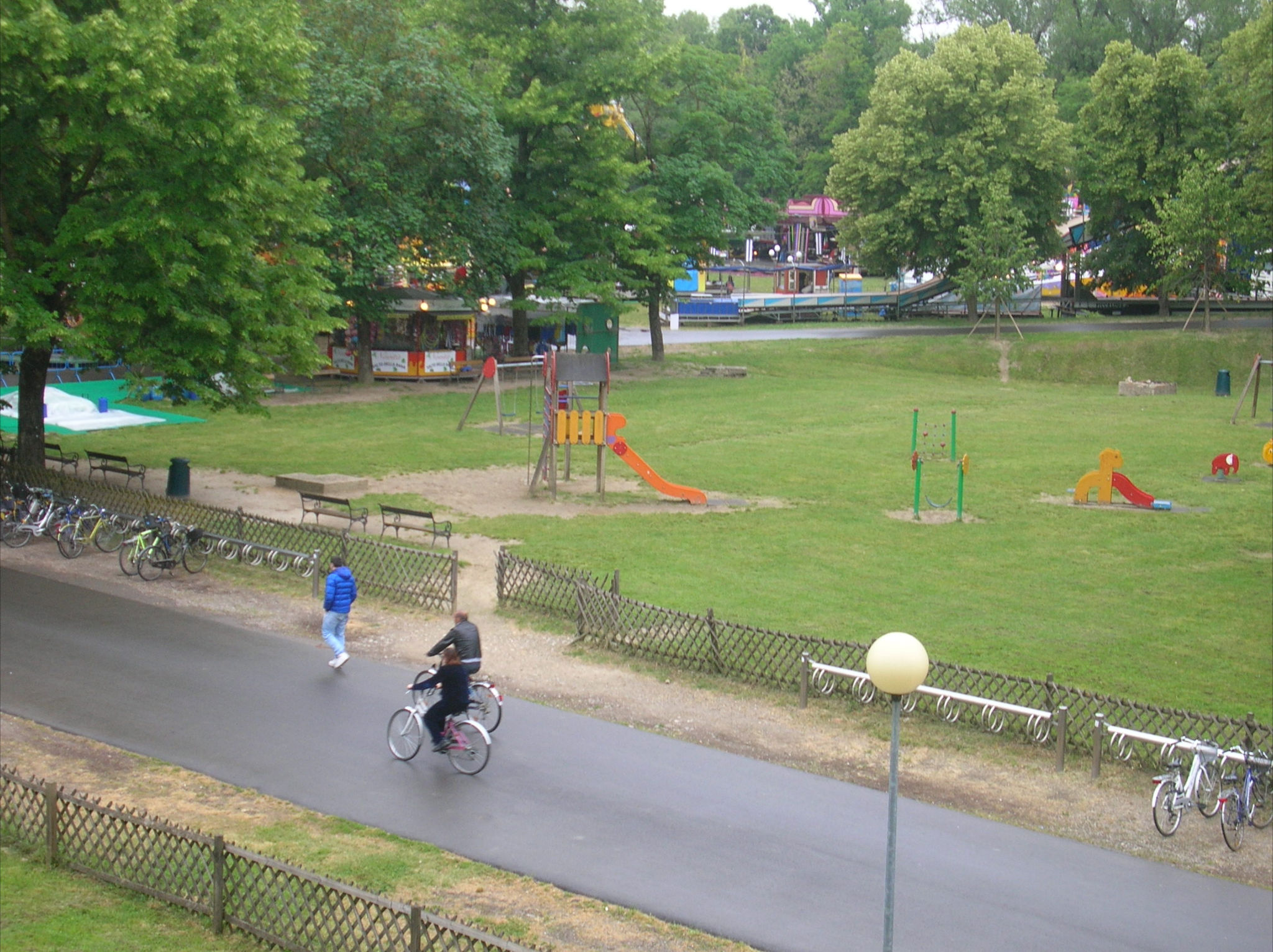
Citadel Park

==== Restoration ====
The Citadel was restored in 2009 at the request of the City of Parma, with a project carried out by Studio Canali. The project, which aimed to introduce services for citizens inside the historic structure while protecting its architectural aspects threatened by vegetation, focused on the static consolidation of the ramparts and the conservative restoration of the atriums leaning against the two monumental gates.

The restoration, which could count on funding of 2.2 million euros, started with the care of the gardens, which cover more than 120000 m^{2} between the part inside the walls and the one outside, through pruning works, planting of new trees and landscaping of the lawns. In a second phase, some synthetic soccer fields and a basketball court were to be built in the lower part of the Citadel, but this has not happened yet. In the upper part of the ramparts, the use of which for jogging is frequent, the time championship system was installed, through which citadel-goers can consult their activity data on a scoreboard.

The last step of the project was the installation of a bar, toilets and changing rooms at the youth hostel, the creation of an area equipped with children's games in the central part and the removal of architectural barriers in the northeast rampart area.

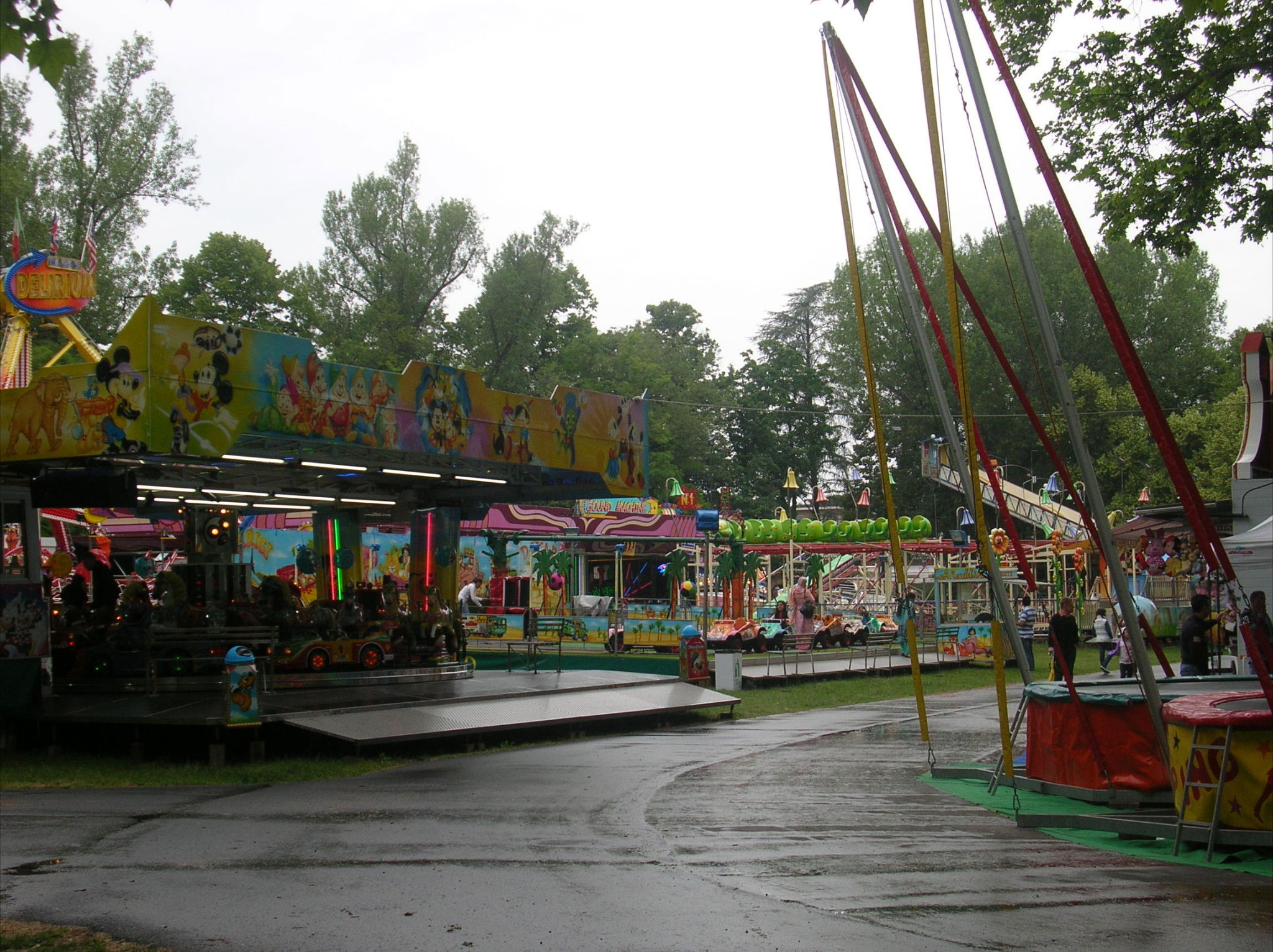
Amusement park at the Citadel Park.

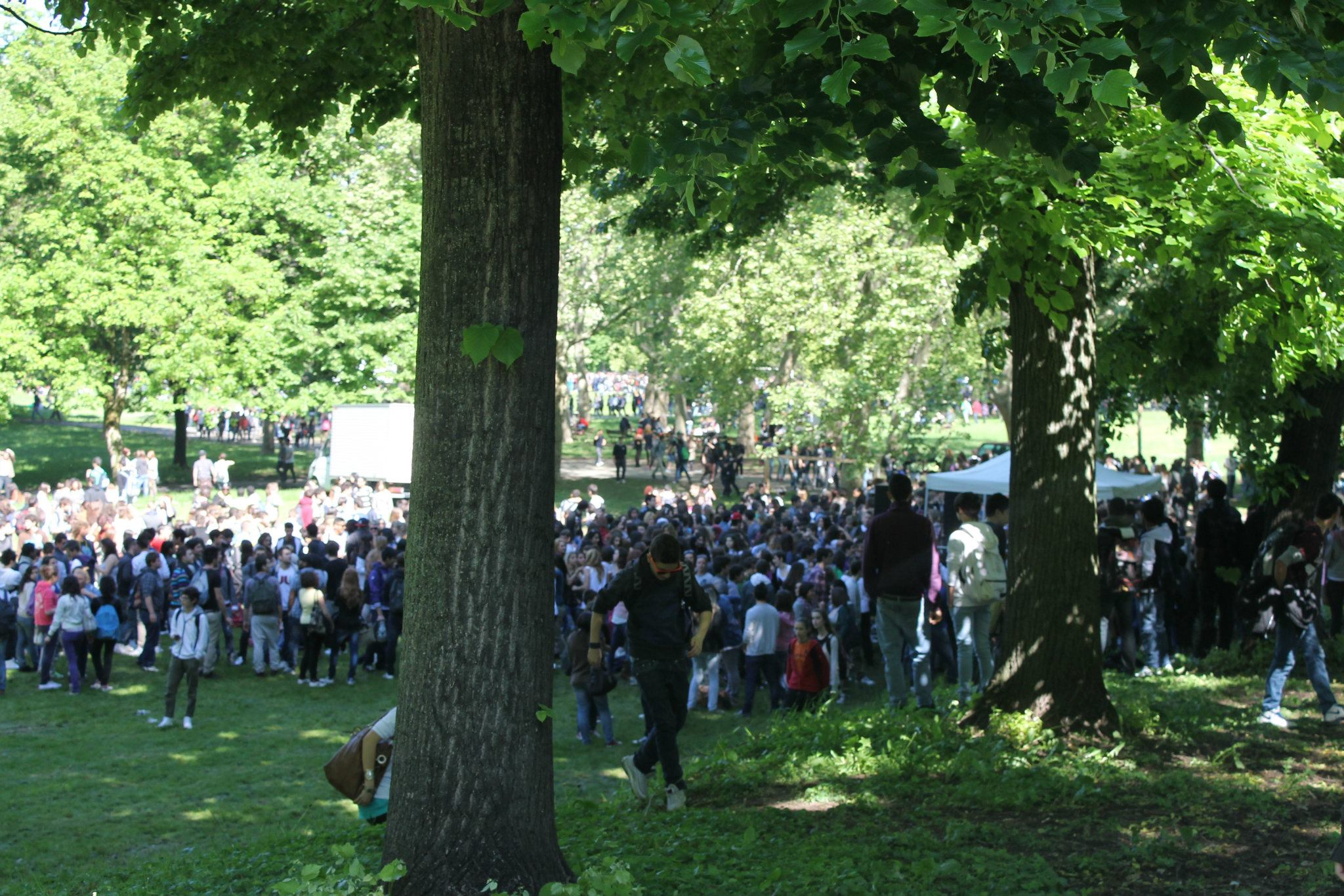
Art Day 2012.

==== Art Day ====
On an annual basis, the Citadel park hosts the Art and Creativity Day, an event in which various students, from the city's leading high schools, come together to display and admire some of the various types of work they have created, such as paintings, drawings, comics, photographs, sculptures, and body painting. Through this experience, it is possible for the children to showcase their skills and abilities in the artistic context. In parallel, musical performances are held, with DJ sets and concerts also organized by the students. At the end of the day, a jury of students and professors eventually awards prizes to those who are judged the best.

==== Amusement park ====
In late spring each year, the park also hosts an amusement park. The City of Parma, with the stated goal of "filling public spaces instead of desertifying them," organizes a theme day there for charitable purposes.

== See also ==
- Alexander Farnese, Duke of Parma

== Bibliography ==
- Adorni, Bruno (2008). L'architettura a Parma sotto i primi Farnese: 1545-1630. Reggio Emilia: Diabasis.
- Papagno, Giuseppe; Marzio Achille Romani (1982). Una Cittadella e una città (il Castello Nuovo farnesiano di Parma, 1589-1597): tensioni sociali e strategie politiche attorno alla costruzione di una fortezza urbana. Bologna: Il mulino.
- Casa, Emilio (1897). La Cittadella di Parma. Parma: Tipografia Luigi Battei.
- Conforti, Paolo (1982). La Cittadella di Parma. Parma: Rotaract Club.
- Guidoni, E.; A. Marino (1991). "La cittadella di Parma". Storia dell'urbanistica, il Cinquecento. Laterza.
