= Oratio Dominica =

1805 book by J. J. Marcel

Oratio Dominica CL Linguis Versa (Italian: Il Libro di Preghiere Della Domenica) is a book written in Latin by Jean-Joseph Marcel. This work was printed in 1805 to honor the visit of Pope Pius VII to France for the coronation of Napoleon in 1804, using types that had been taken out of Italy after Napoleon's invasion in 1796. It contains the Lord's Prayer printed in 150 different languages and dialects. The book is divided alphabetically, and by geographic continents, comprising Asia, Europe, Africa, and the Americas. The section on the Americas shows nineteen Native American languages.

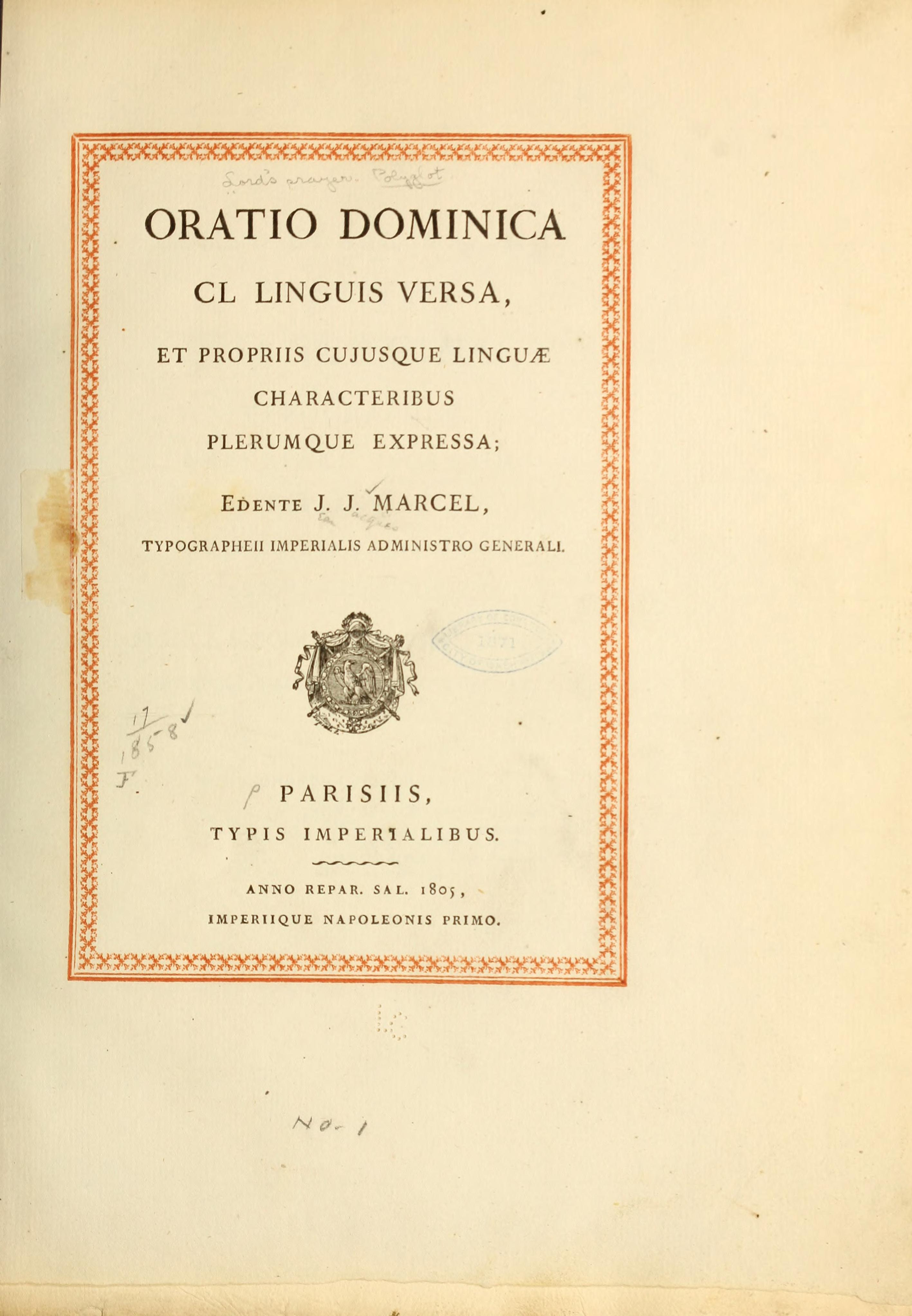
"Oratio Dominica" Book
