= Jean-Joseph Marcel =

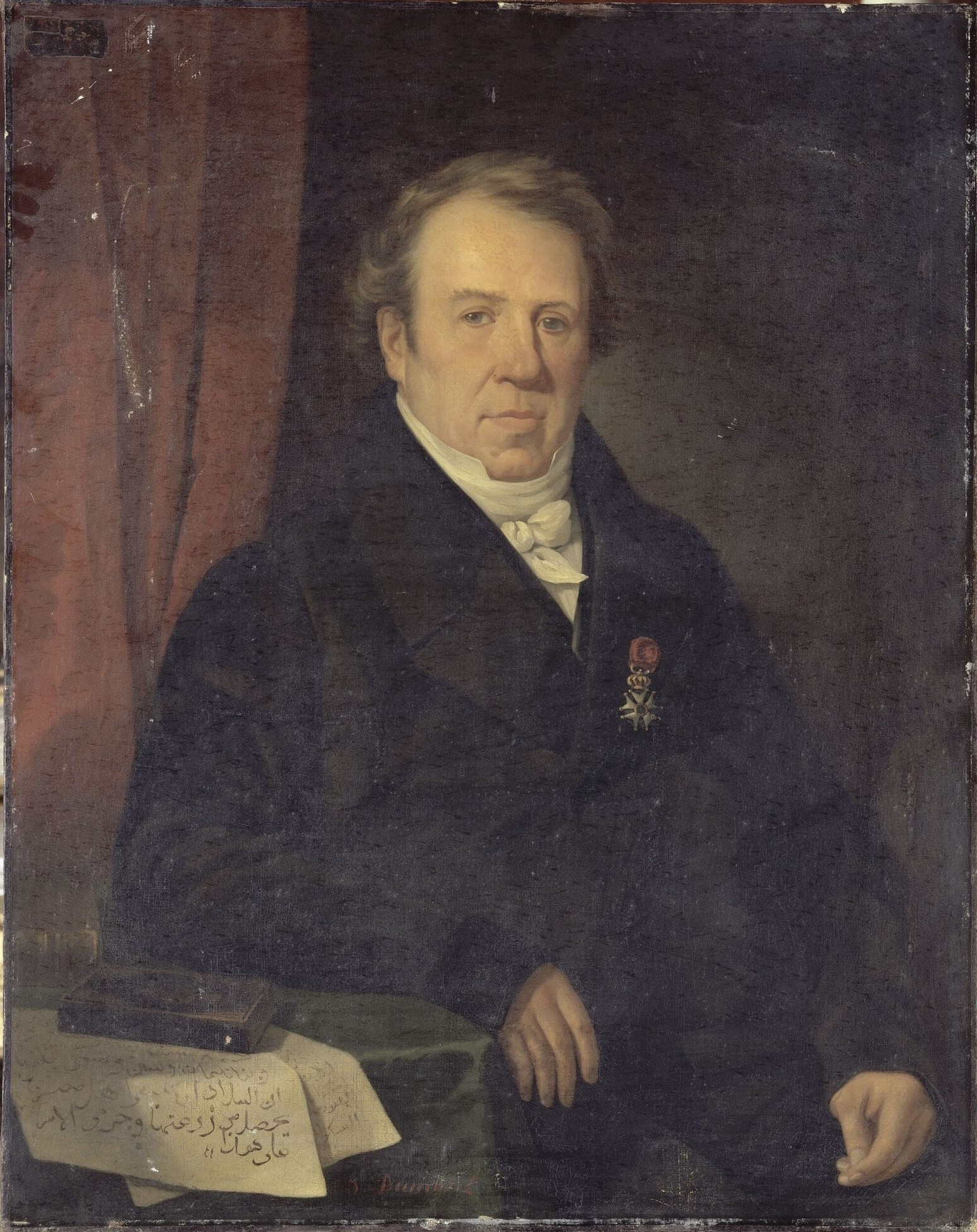
Portrait by François Dumont

Jean-Joseph Marcel (24 November 1776 – 11 March 1854) was a French printer and engineer. He was also a savant who accompanied Napoleon's 1798 campaign in Egypt as a member of the Commission des Sciences et des Arts, a corps of 167 technical experts.

== Early years ==
Marcel was born in Paris, France.

== Rosetta Stone ==
During the French Campaign in Egypt, the Rosetta Stone was discovered and transported to Cairo for examination by scholars. Jean-Joseph Marcel, who was also a gifted linguist, is credited as the first person to recognise that the middle text of the Rosetta Stone, originally guessed to be Syriac, was in fact the Egyptian demotic script, rarely used for stone inscriptions and therefore seldom seen by scholars at that time. It was Marcel, along with the artist and inventor Nicolas-Jacques Conté, who figured out a way to use the Stone as a printing block. The prints that were made were circulated to scholars in Europe, who started the work of translating the texts, which culminated just over 20 years later, when Jean-François Champollion deciphered the Egyptian texts in 1822.

== Director of Imperial Press ==
When he returned to France, on 1 January 1803, Marcel was appointed the Director of the Imperial Press, where he remained until 1815. In 1805, during a visit by Pope Pius VII, he had the Lord's Prayer printed in one hundred and fifty languages in the Pope's presence, under the title Oratio Dominica. At the time of the conquest of Algeria in 1830, he published an Arabic-French dictionary.

== Honors ==
He was made a Chevalier (Knight) of the Legion of Honor for his services to the state.

== Death ==
Marcel died in Paris.

== Bibliography ==
- "Notice nécrologique et littéraire sur M. J.J. Marcel ... ancien directeur de l'imprimerie impériale, etc. par M. Belin, drogman chancelier, interprète en chef de l'armée d'Orient" in Journal asiatique, 5th ser. vol. 3 (1854) pp. 553–562 Online text
