= Palazzo della Pilotta =

Complex of edifices in Parma, Italy

Coordinates: 44°48′18″N 10°19′34″E

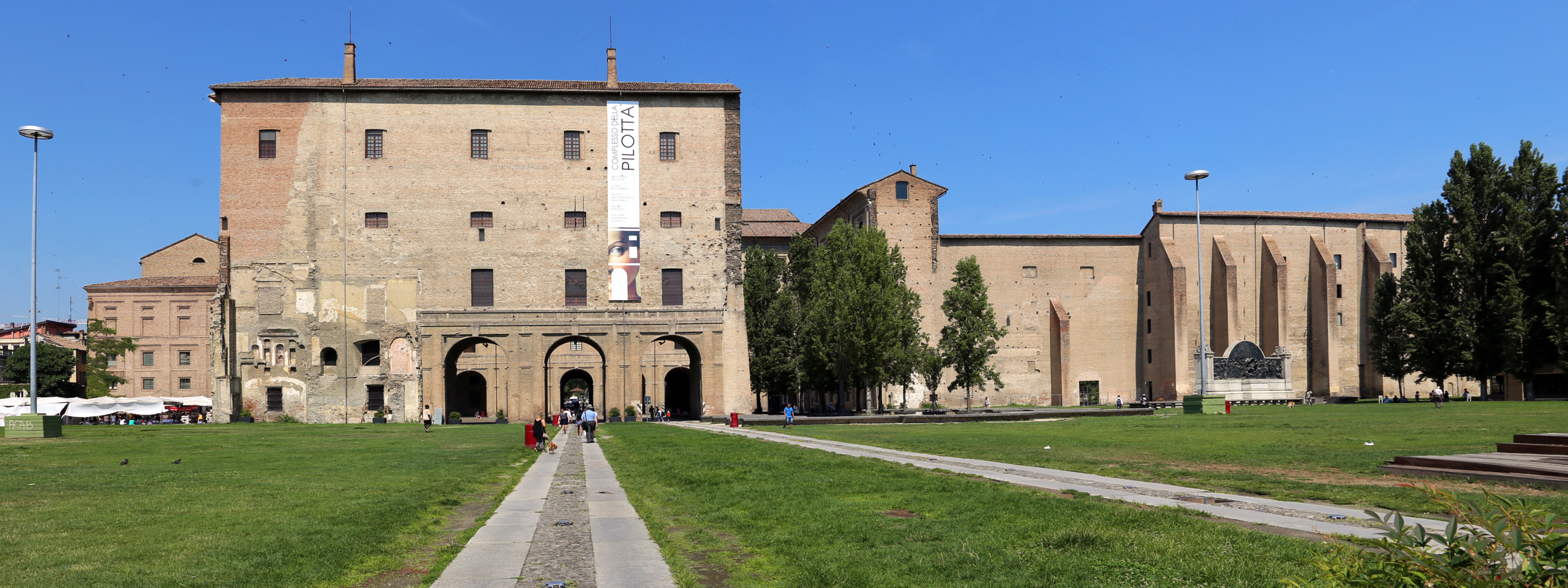
View of Palazzo della Pilotta. The rebuilt part on the right is where once was the church of St. Peter. The large hole was caused by a bombing.

The Palazzo della Pilotta is a complex of edifices located between Piazzale della Pace and the Lungoparma in the historical centre of Parma, region of Emilia Romagna, Italy. Its name derives from the game of pilota played at one time by Spanish soldiers stationed in Parma.

== History ==
Development of the Palazzo della Pilotta over time

Built around 1583, during the last years of reign of Duke Ottavio Farnese, it developed around the corridor (Corridore) which connected the keep (Rocchetta, traces of which can be seen next the river Parma) to the Ducal Palace: the latter, begun in 1622 under Duke Ranuccio I, was never completed. the façade on the Piazza della Ghiaia is missing and the annexed Dominican church of St. Peter was demolished only in recent times.

The existing complex includes three courts: the Cortile di San Pietro Martire (now best known as Cortile della Pilotta), Cortile del Guazzatoio (originally della pelota) and the Cortile della Racchetta. The Pilotta was to house a large hall, later turned into the Teatro Farnese, the stables and the grooms' residences, the Academy Hall and other rooms.

After the end of the Farnese family rule of Parma, much of the movable assets of the palace were removed by then Duke Charles I, later King of Spain, and taken to Naples in the 1730s. The Biblioteca Palatina was established here by 1769. Elizabeth Farnese, Queen of Spain, was born here in 1692.

In the second half of the nineteenth century, the Reinach Theatre was built on the area of the previous church of San Pietro Martire, inaugurated in 1871. In 1939 it changed its name to Teatro Paganini and was almost completely destroyed, along with parts of the palace, by an aerial bombardment in May 1944, and then demolished. The old Doge's Palace was also severely damaged and then demolished.

Between 1986 and 2001, after a long and debated planning phase, the redevelopment of the Piazzale della Pace was completed on a project by the Swiss architect Mario Botta, creating the large garden and the fountain that follows the perimeter of the former church of San Pietro.

== Museums ==
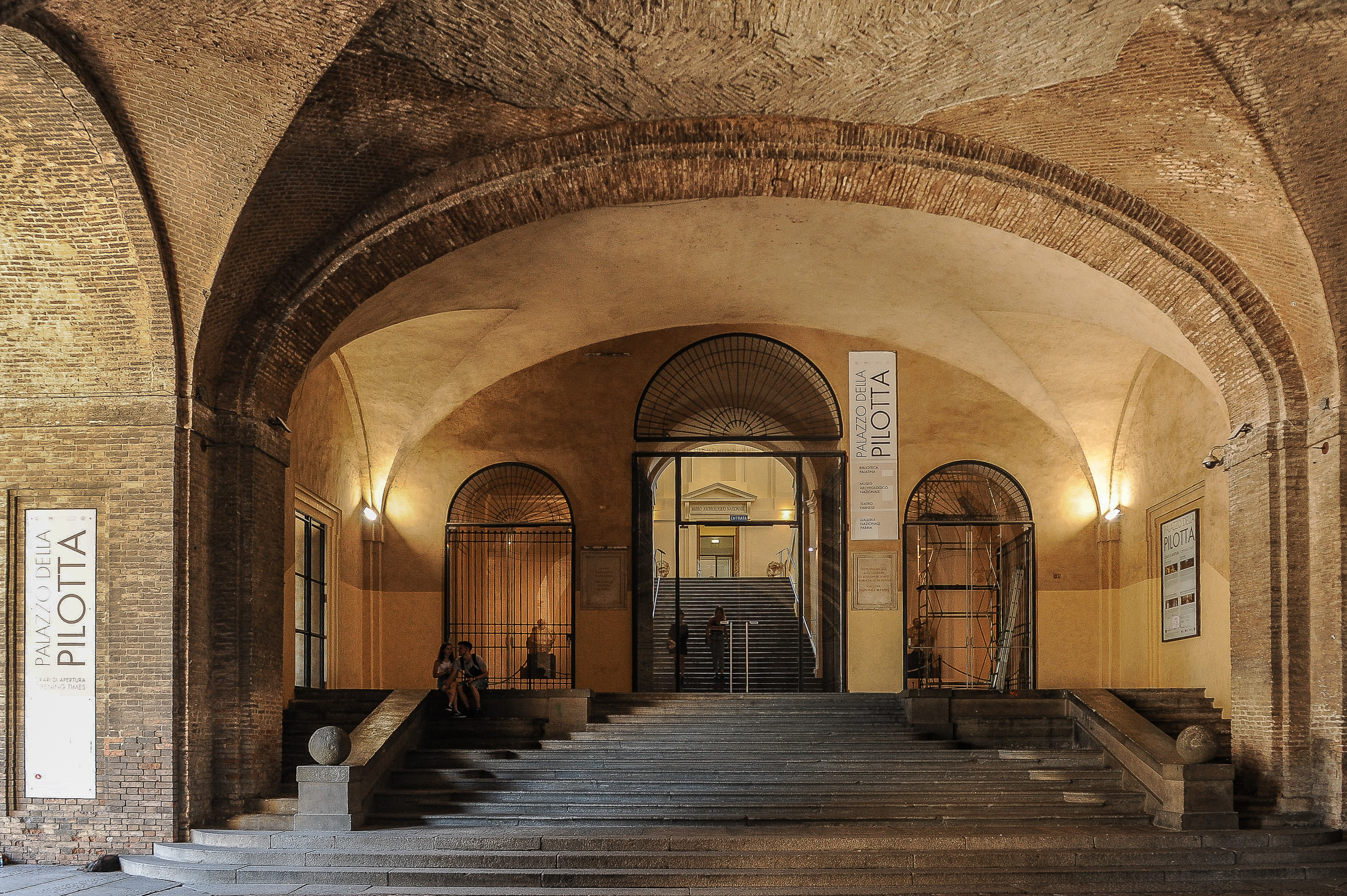
Museum entrance

By 2015, the building spaces had been taken up by a number of cultural institutions and museums, including in addition to the library:

- National Archaeological Museum
- Liceo artistico statale Paolo Toschi (it), an art school named after Paolo Toschi
- Museo Bodoniano (it), a museum dedicated to Giambattista Bodoni
- Teatro Farnese
- Galleria Nazionale di Parma

== See also ==
- Ball of wind
- Valencian pilota
- Ducal Palace of Colorno
- Ducal Palace of Parma
- Palazzo del Giardino
- Palazzo di Riserva
