= Ducal Chapel of San Liborio =

Chapel in Emilia-Romagna, Italy

Coordinates: 44°55′51″N 10°22′41″E

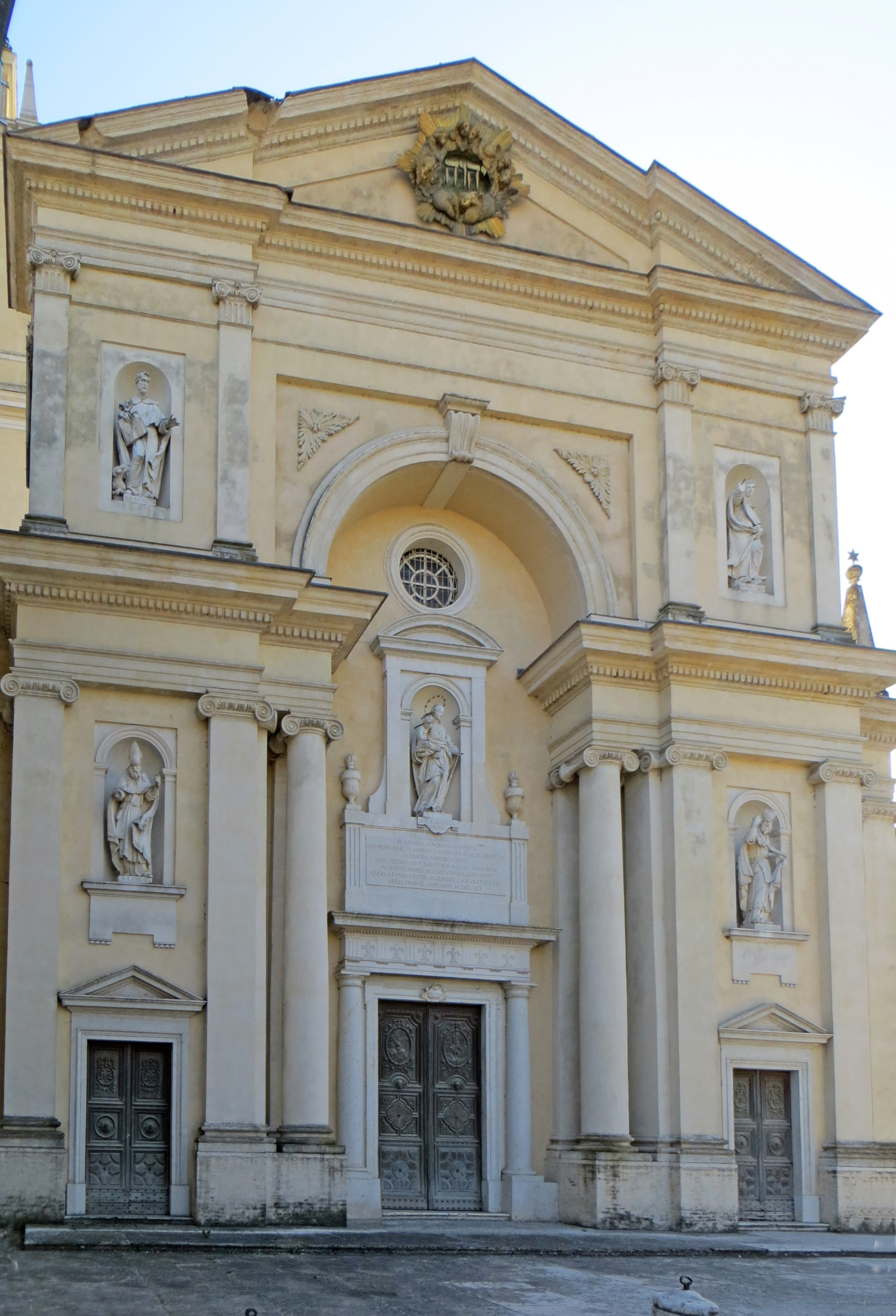
- Facade
- Ducal Chapel of San Liborio
- Location: Colorno, Emilia-Romagna, Italy
- Address: Via Roma 3
- Denomination: Roman Catholic

History
- Founder: Ferdinand I, Duke of Parma
- Dedication: Liborius of Le Mans
- Consecrated: 1777

Architecture
- Architect(s): Ennemond Alexandre Petitot, Gaspare Turbini, Pietro Cugini, Donnino Ferrari, Louis-Auguste Feneulle and Domenico Cossetti
- Style: Neoclassical
- Groundbreaking: 1775
- Completed: 1792

Administration
- Diocese: Diocese of Parma

The Ducal Chapel of San Liborio is a Catholic place of worship characterized by neoclassical forms, located at Via Roma 3 in Colorno, within the province and Diocese of Parma, behind the grand Ducal Palace.

Originally built in 1722 as a palatine chapel on the initiative of Duke Francesco Farnese, likely designed by Giuliano Mozzani, the church was rebuilt between 1775 and 1777 under the patronage of Duke Ferdinand I, possibly by Gaspare Turbini, who drew inspiration from Ennemond Alexandre Petitot's 1754 designs. Between 1789 and 1792, it was expanded by an unidentified architect, possibly Pietro Cugini, Donnino Ferrari, Louis-Auguste Feneulle, or Domenico Cossetti.

The chapel is regarded, for the integrity of its forms, as a "monument of neoclassical art" and one of the churches housing the greatest number of artworks in the diocese.

== History ==
=== First chapel ===
Around 1722, upon completion of the renovation works on the Ducal Palace and its expansive park, Francesco Farnese decided to construct a palatine chapel dedicated to Saint Liborius, the patron saint of those afflicted with kidney stones, a condition from which the Duke of Parma suffered. The oratory, likely designed by architect Giuliano Mozzani, who had previously worked on the palace, was completed in 1725. The Baroque place of worship, bordered to the northeast by the Naviglio canal, featured a single-nave plan flanked by one chapel on each side, with an entrance to the southeast and an apsed presbytery to the northwest. It was surmounted by a high drum supporting a dome, topped with a lantern.

In 1734, during the Battle of Colorno, the church sustained partial damage.

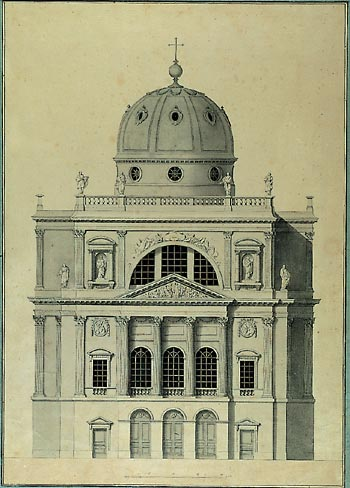
Elevation project of the chapel, designed by Ennemond Alexandre Petitot in 1755

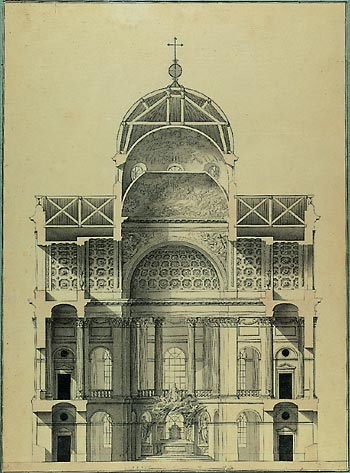
Cross-sectional project of the chapel, designed by Ennemond Alexandre Petitot in 1755

In 1755, Duke Philip of Bourbon commissioned Ennemond Alexandre Petitot to design a grander, more expansive chapel that would harmonize with the adjacent palace. The architect produced two drawings and five prints, which were used by carpenter Michel Poncet and carver Marc Vibert to create a scaled wooden model of the new structure. The proposed church, in neoclassical style, was to feature a Latin cross plan with three naves and three vertical orders, the middle one—intended for the duke and his court—being taller and more opulent, adorned with statues and Corinthian columns. A large dome was planned to crown the roof. However, construction never commenced.

=== Second chapel ===
About two decades later, Duke Ferdinand of Bourbon resolved to fulfill his father’s vision. The architect responsible remains uncertain, but a surviving copy of a project drafted by Gaspare Turbini in 1772 suggests his involvement, with the design inspired by Petitot’s general layout and decorations. In early 1775, the Baroque chapel was demolished, and the foundation stone for the new temple was laid on May 16 of that year. (Note: An inscription in the mortar covering the vault of the central nave reads: "In the year of the Lord 1775, on December 15, I, Francesco Antonelli, with companions, completed the vault of this church with the assistance of the great [...] Pietro Maria Monteverdi, who laid the first stone in the foundations on May 16, 1775." See Pellegri (1981, p. 103).) Construction continued for approximately two years, and on October 16, 1777, the place of worship was solemnly consecrated by Alessandro Garimberti, Bishop of Borgo San Donnino.

The neoclassical church was designed with a Latin cross plan comprising three naves, with an entrance to the southwest and an apsed presbytery to the northeast, adjacent to the Naviglio canal. The symmetrical facade featured three portals leading to the narthex, flanked by two spaces for confessionals. The nave was bordered by four chapels on each side, dedicated on the right to the Holy Family, the relics of saints, Saint Peter Martyr, and Saint Dominic, and on the left to the Crucifix, Saint Pius V, Saint Vincent Ferrer, and Our Lady of the Rosary. To the southeast were the chambers of the Relics, the Fire, and the Well, spaces for the confraternities of Saint Roch, the Most Holy Name of God, and the Most Holy Rosary, as well as the bell tower and, at the rear, the sacristy.

The building was immediately enriched with numerous artworks, including oils by Gaetano Callani, Giuseppe Baldrighi, Antonio Bresciani, Pietro Pedroni, Pietro Melchiorre Ferrari, and Laurent Pécheux. Decorative elements were crafted in the following years by prominent ducal artists, including painters Domenico Muzzi and Evangelista Ferrari, stucco artist Benigno Bossi, carvers Ignazio Marchetti, Giuseppe Sbravati, and Giovanni Prati, and carpenter Michel Poncet. An organ by Giovanni Cavalletti was also installed on the choir loft.

In 1786, the chapel of the Holy Relics was renovated based on a design by Donnino Ferrari. The space was decorated by painters Gaetano Ghidetti and Antonio Bresciani, with furnishings crafted by carver Ignazio Verstrackt.

During the same period, to improve access to the monumental building, the Naviglio canal was diverted eastward, and a road was established in its place.

=== Third chapel ===
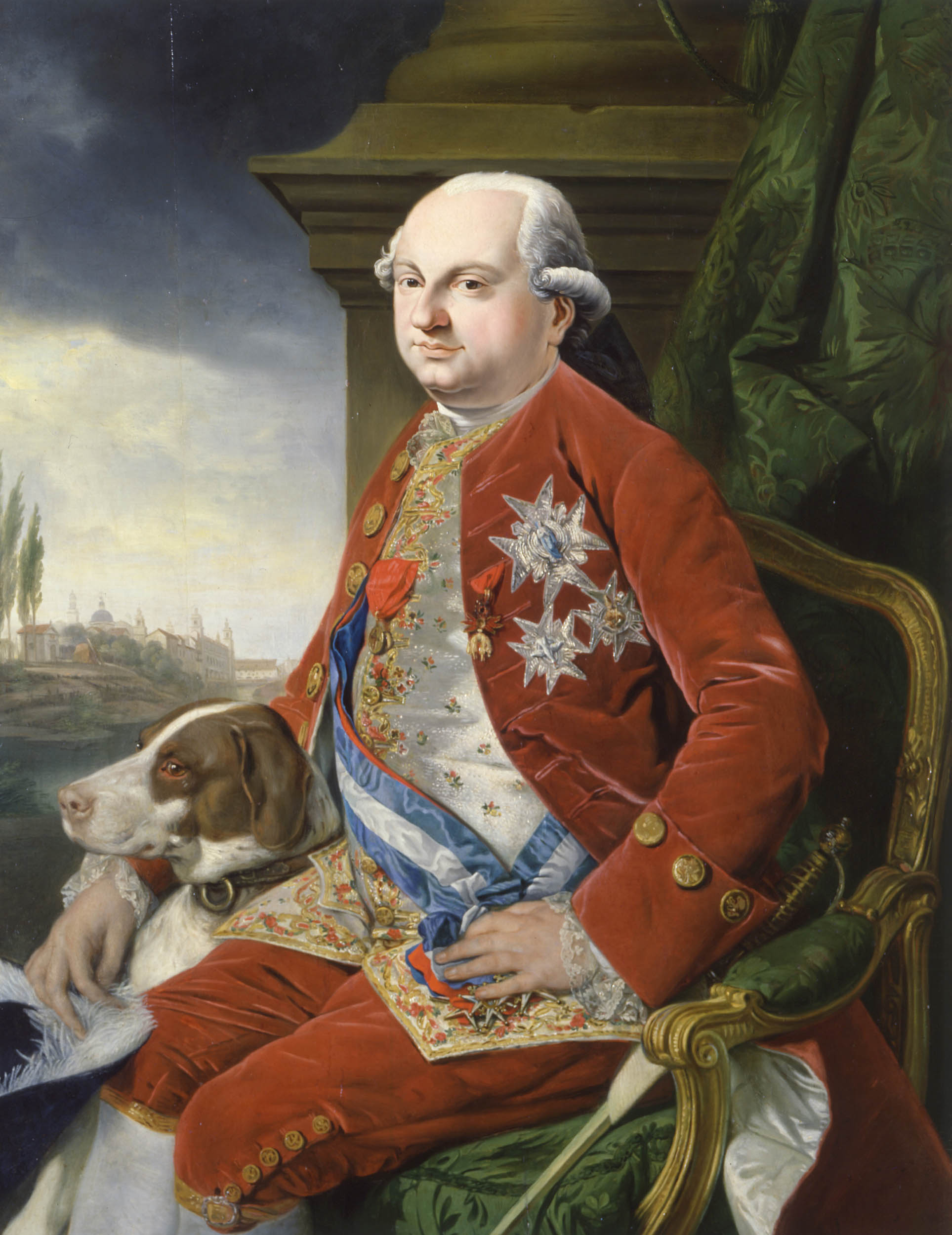
Ferdinand of Bourbon in a portrait by Johan Zoffany (1778–79)

The rerouting of the Naviglio canal did not fully resolve the issue of limited external access, as the facade faced an internal courtyard of the palace, making the chapel primarily a ducal preserve. To facilitate public access, in 1788, Ferdinand of Bourbon decided to reorient the church by 180 degrees and significantly extend the nave. The Duke commissioned an unidentified architect, with historians debating whether it was Pietro Cugini or Donnino Ferrari. Cugini is known to have submitted a facade design, which was not approved, but he likely oversaw the renovation works. Some internal spaces, including the presbytery, were designed and directed by Ferrari, while the main facade is speculated by some scholars to have been designed by Louis-Auguste Feneulle or Domenico Cossetti between 1789 and 1791.

Construction began in 1789 with the demolition of the facade, the presbytery, and most of the lateral spaces, preserving only the transept, dome, some chapels, and the bell tower. The works lasted approximately three years, and on October 16, 1792, the new church was solemnly consecrated by Bishop of Parma Adeodato Turchi.

The palatine chapel, maintaining the neoclassical style outlined by Petitot’s 1754 project, was adorned by numerous contemporary artists, continuing the earlier decorative scheme. Most furnishings were retained, though some were adapted to the building’s new dimensions. The original wooden, gilded, and carved high altar from 1777, crafted by Ignazio Marchetti and Giuseppe Sbravati, which included an altarpiece and four statues representing the allegories of Justice, Hope, Faith, and Charity, was not reused. (Note: The statues of Faith and Charity were later relocated to the sides of the altarpiece frame of the high altar in the Colorno Cathedral. See Pellegri (1981, p. 199).) The original organ was replaced with a new one featuring 2,898 pipes, crafted by brothers Andrea and Giuseppe Serassi between 1792 and 1796.

To further enhance accessibility, in 1796, Ferdinand commissioned the construction of a new bridge over the Parma River, dedicated to Saint John Nepomuk, designed by engineer Giuseppe Cocconcelli.

Between 1834 and 1844, the chapel hosted all religious services in Colorno during the complete renovation of the Santa Margherita Cathedral.

In 1862, with the transfer of the Ducal Palace and its dependencies to the public domain, the grand building was stripped of all its furnishings, except for the San Liborio Chapel, which preserved nearly all its rich artistic heritage. In 1870, the entire complex was acquired by the Province of Parma.

In 2010, significant restoration work began, focusing on the facade, the forecourt, the bell tower, and the adjacent buildings’ exteriors, concluding the following year. However, between January 25 and 27, 2012, the strong earthquakes caused damage to the palace complex, including the Ducal Chapel, leading to its closure for worship. The church underwent further restoration and structural reinforcement, targeting the nave vaults, bell tower, pediment, and facade sculptures. It reopened on July 28, 2013, while the palace restoration was completed two years later, with an official inauguration on February 21, 2015. Additional works, addressing the temple’s external plaster and vases on the facade’s crowning that fell during the earthquake, began in 2020.

== Description ==
The church is designed on a Latin cross plan with three naves flanked by six chapels on each side, with the entrance to the northeast and an apsed presbytery to the southwest.

=== Exterior ===
==== Facade ====
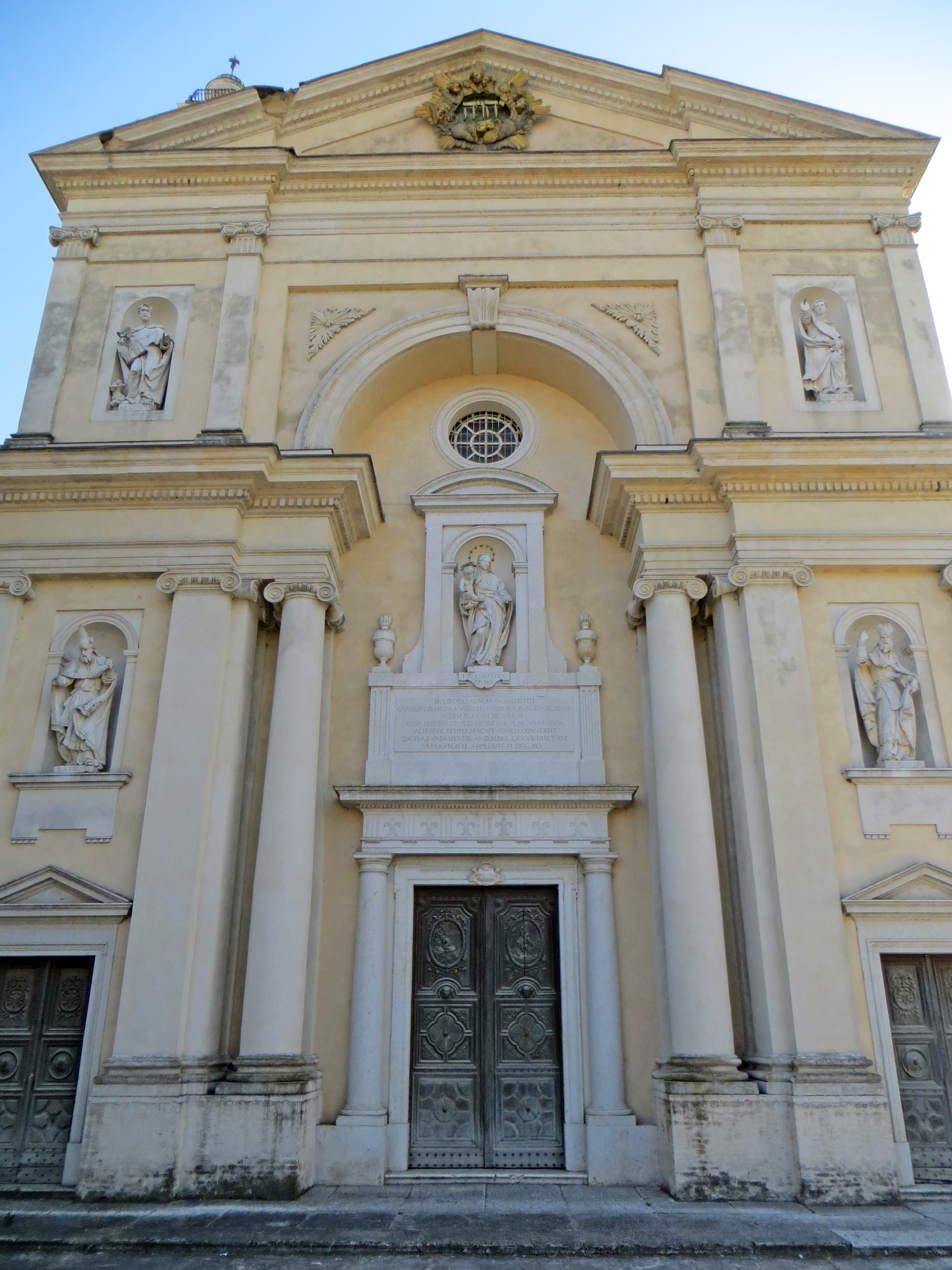
Central portion of the facade

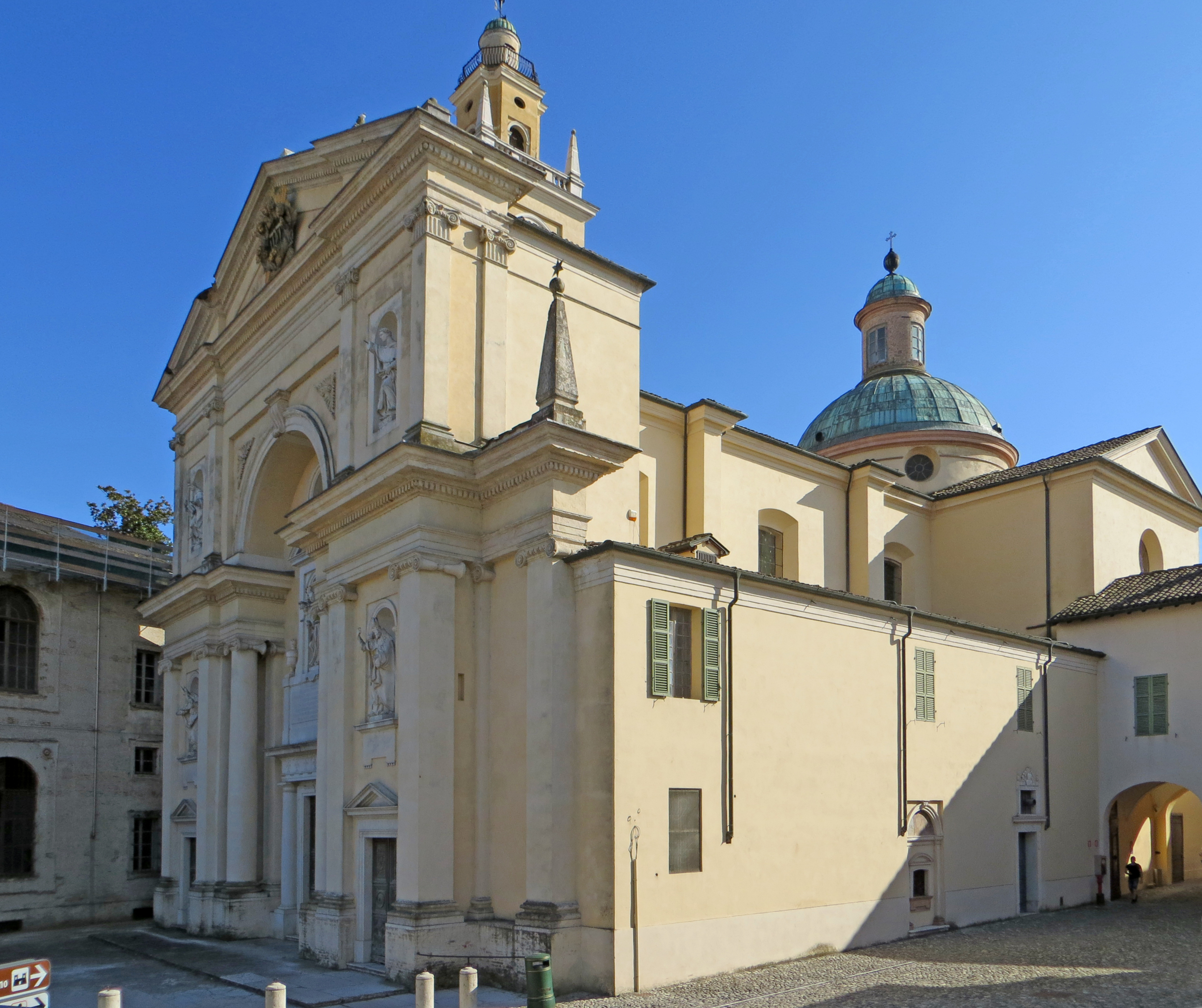
Facade and northwest side

The monumental, symmetrical gable facade, entirely plastered like the rest of the building, is divided horizontally into two sections by a high string course, interrupted at the center.

The lower section is divided into three parts. The lateral projections are defined by Ionic pilasters, while the central section is flanked by two Ionic columns. The main entrance portal, framed by a molding and two Doric half-columns supporting an architrave decorated with triglyphs alternating with Bourbon lilies, is enclosed by a double-leaf wooden door, carved in 1777 by Ignazio Marchetti, Giuseppe Sbravati, and Giovanni Prati with geometric motifs and scenes of the Sacrifice of Isaac on the right and the Delivery of the Tablets to Moses on the left. Above the portal, a large slab bears a Latin inscription commemorating the chapel’s foundation and reconstruction: "D. Liborio Cenoman Antistiti - Quam prius hic Francisci Farnesii Par. Plac. Ducis pietas - Aedem sacram dicaverat - Mox Ferdinandus I Hisp. Inf. Par. Plac. Vast. Dux - In huius templi magnitudinem convertit - Quod a fundamentis An. D. MDCCLXXVII erectum - Versa fronte ampliavit MDCCXCI". The inscription is surmounted by a round arch niche crowned by a semicircular pediment, containing a white Verona marble statue of the Madonna with Child, crafted by Gaetano Cignaroli between 1789 and 1791. Higher up, a central oculus is framed by a molding. The lateral projections feature two secondary entrance portals, framed by moldings and topped with triangular pediments, enclosed by double-leaf wooden doors carved in 1777 by Marchetti with geometric motifs. Above these are two round arch niches containing marble statues of Saint Liborius and Saint Bernard, also by Cignaroli.

The upper section is divided by four Ionic pilasters, aligned with those below. A large round arch connects the lower lateral projections, while two niches on either side house marble statues of Saint Vincent Ferrer and Saint Peter of Verona, also by Cignaroli. The facade is crowned by a large triangular pediment with a dentiled cornice, featuring a bronze sculpture of cherubs arranged in a radial pattern around the Hebrew inscription יהוה (Jehovah), crafted by Benedetto Silvestre. At the apex, four slender vases and a central metal cross rise.

The facade extends at the ends in correspondence with the chapels, with two sections defined by Ionic pilasters and topped with attics. Two tall pyramidal pinnacles crown the structure.

==== Sides and bell tower ====
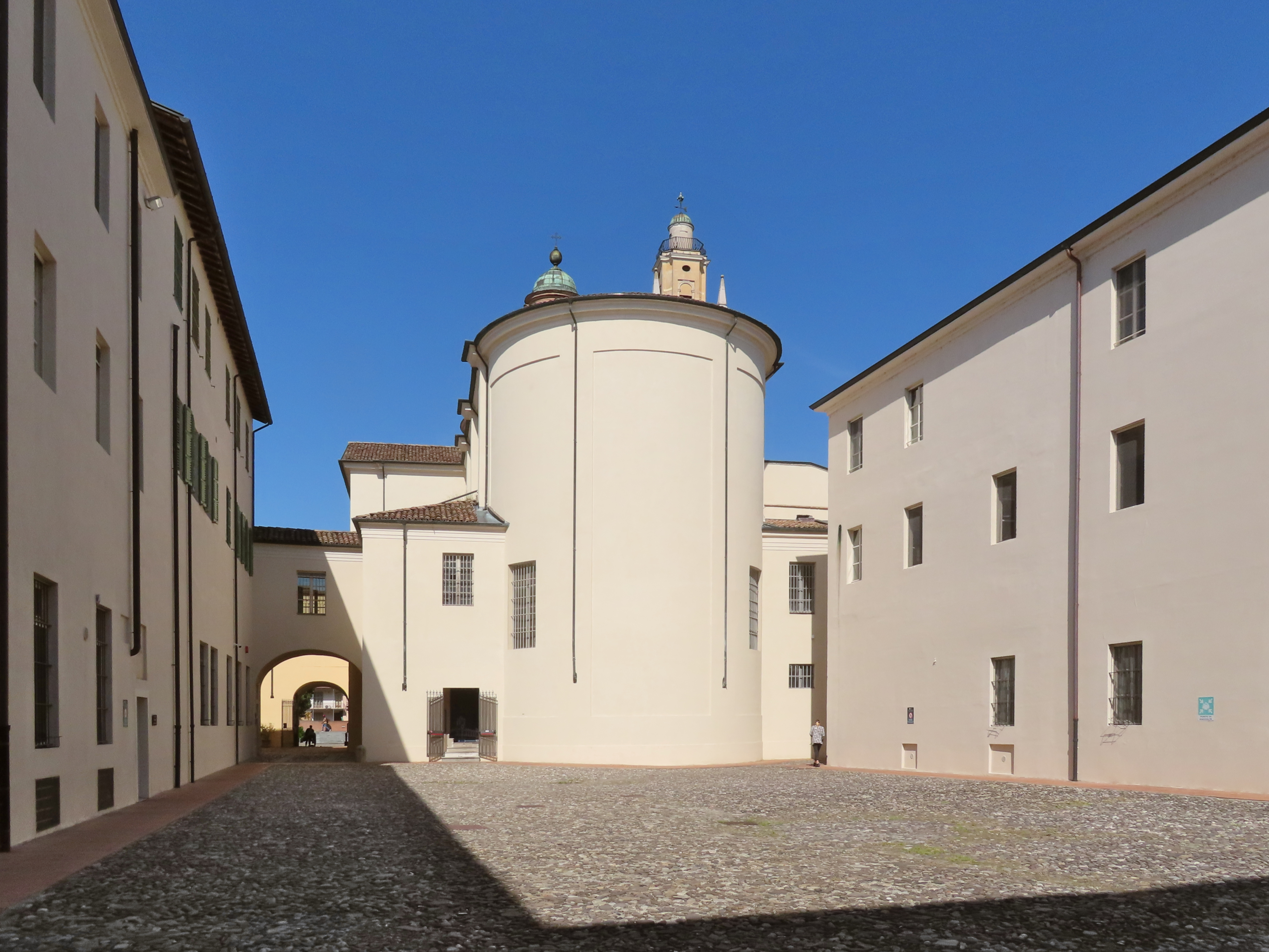
Apse

The free right side features several openings. Approximately halfway along the facade, a window with a segmental arch is framed by a molding topped with a semicircular pediment. This window overlooks a space adjacent to the Saint Pius V chapel, originally housing a polychrome terracotta sculpture of the Deposition from the Tomb, crafted by Laurent Guyard in 1775 and relocated to the Saint Dominic chapel in the mid-20th century. The window is flanked by two Doric pilasters supporting a large lunette with a round arch, containing a fresco of the Pietà.

On the same side, near the gallery connecting to Duke Ferdinand’s new apartment, is a portal framed by a molded cornice and topped with a projecting architrave. Above it, a small window with a semicircular pediment is adorned with two relief torches and a high-relief medallion featuring the Christogram and the number XXI, surrounded by garlands.

At the center of the roof, where the central nave and transept intersect, a dome rises on a drum, crowned by a lantern.

On the left, adjacent to the small chapel of Saints Hyacinth and Rose, a bell tower rises in three tiers separated by string courses. The belfry opens on all four sides with large monoforas with round arches framed by Doric pilasters. Above a projecting perimeter cornice, a lantern with an octagonal base rises between four pyramidal pinnacles, topped by a circular lantern.

=== Interior ===
==== Naves ====
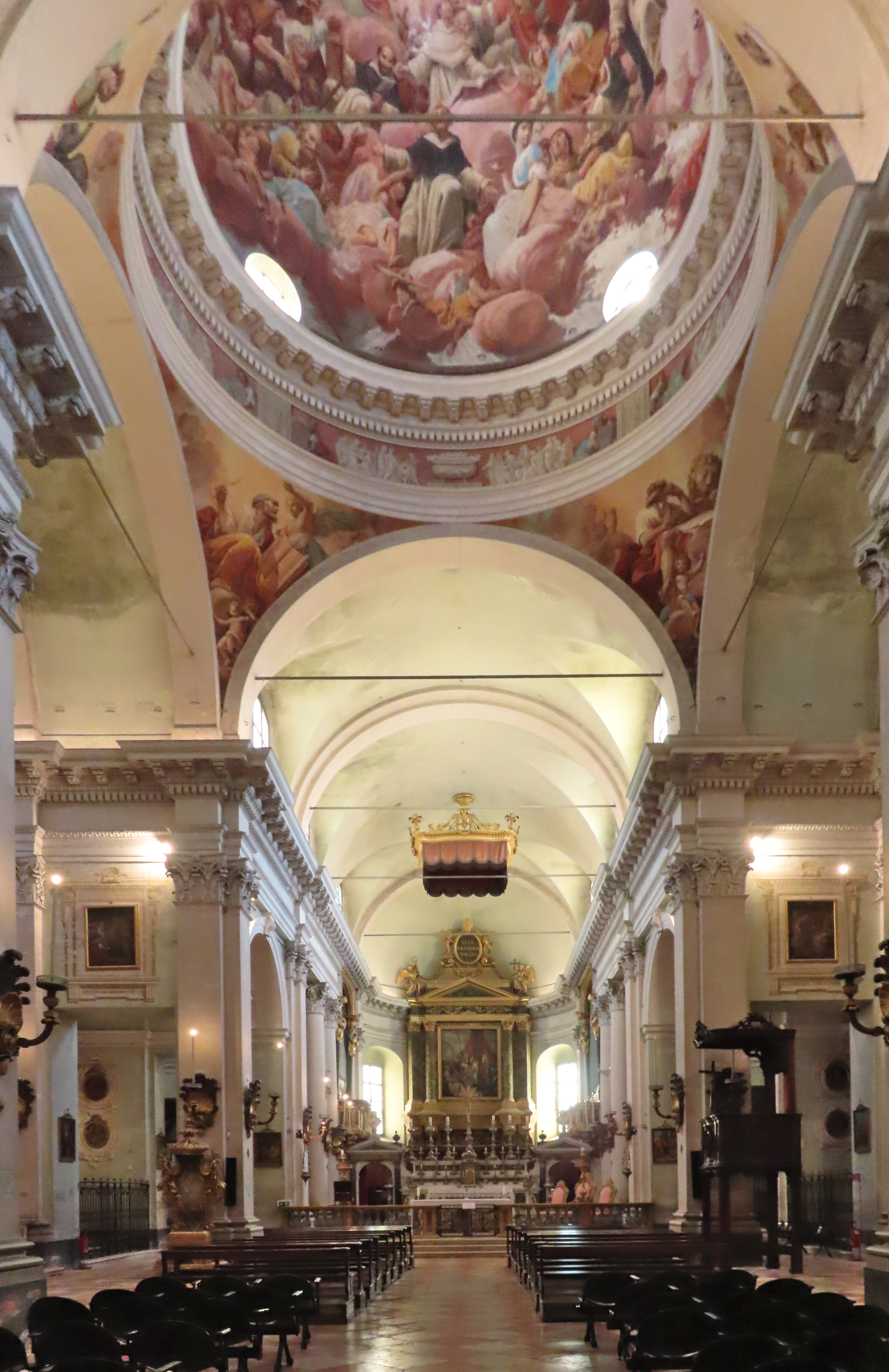
Central nave

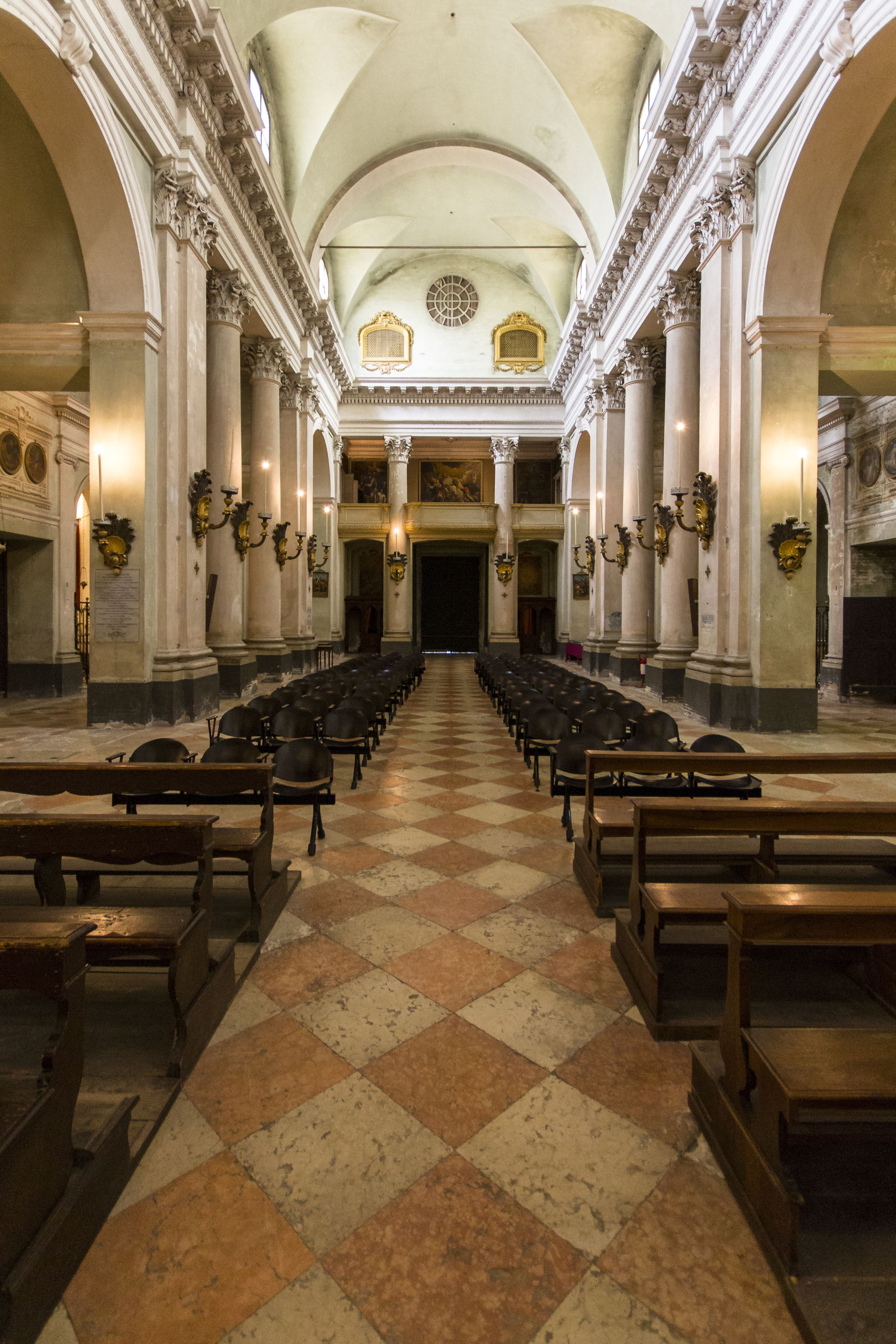
Counterfacade

Upon entering through the portals, one reaches the narthex, separated from the nave by a giant Corinthian colonnade supporting the ducal tribune, crafted by Ignazio Verstrackt or Ignazio Marchetti in 1792. Between the entrances are two neoclassical wooden confessionals with three arches, crafted by Michel Poncet toward the end of the 18th century, and, higher up, two processional banners depicting the Christogram Adored by Two Angels and the Madonna of the Rosary with Saint Dominic and Blessed Stephana, painted by Antonio Bresciani in 1786. On either side are two oils depicting Christ and the Adulteress and the Death of Saint Alexis, by an unknown artist from the second half of the 18th century. Above, in the ducal tribune, are canvases depicting Saint Isidore the Farmer and a Holy Bishop Adoring the Eucharist, dating to around 1650, the Communion of Saint Lucy, painted in the second half of the 18th century by an anonymous artist close to Gaetano Callani, and a Carthusian Saint in Glory, created by Giovanni Evangelista Draghi in the early 18th century.

The nave retains its original flooring of alternating white marble and Red Verona marble square tiles in a checkerboard pattern. The wide central nave, covered by a barrel vault with lunettes, is separated from the side aisles by alternating giant-order colonnades and round arches supported by sturdy pilasters adorned with lesenes, sustaining a high perimeter entablature decorated with dentils and consoles. The columns and pilasters are embellished with a series of gilded wooden candleholder plaques carved by Ignazio Marchetti in 1792, and are crowned with stucco Corinthian capitals, crafted along with the cornice by Benigno Bossi in 1777 and again in 1791.

On the pilasters and in the side aisles, several tombstones are embedded, including one from 1777 for the French general Léopold-Marc de Ligniville, who died during the attack on Colorno on June 1, 1734, commissioned by Duke Ferdinand, one from 1788 for Maria Anna Le Blanc, personal maid to Duchess Maria Amalia, one from 1795 for Filippo Spritz, court gardener during the reigns of Philip and Ferdinand, and one from 1798 for Luigi Pesci, court cook to Duke Ferdinand.

On the right, beside the transept, stands the pulpit in walnut, crafted by Poncet, carved by Marchetti, and sculpted by Sbravati in 1779. Supported by four small columns, the structure features three panels adorned with garlands and medallions depicting Saint Dominic, Saint Vincent Ferrer, and Saint Peter Martyr. The rear wooden wall, accessible via a poplar staircase, supports a baldachin, with the ceiling decorated with the Dove of the Holy Spirit within a radial pattern.

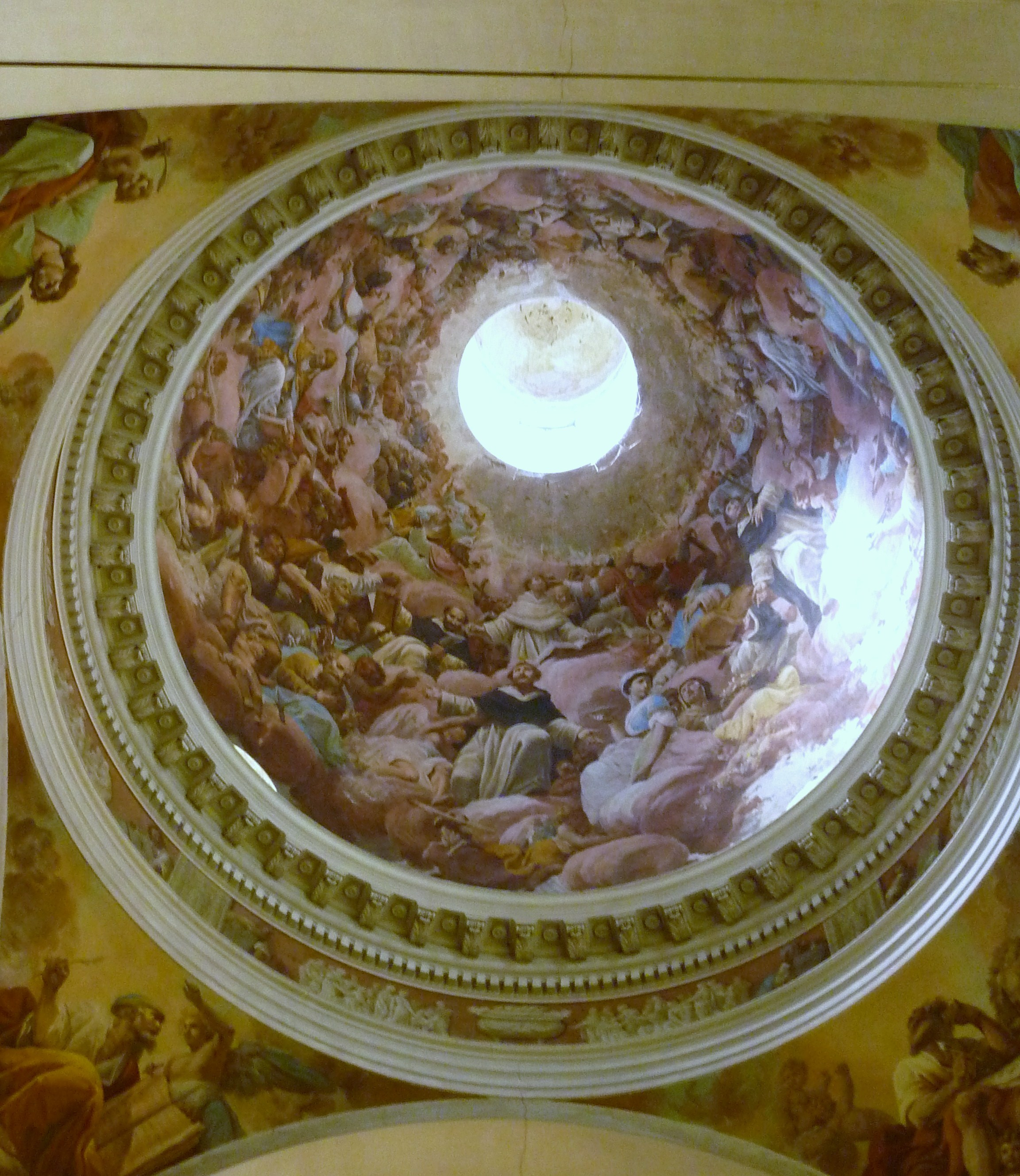
Dome

At the intersection of the central nave and transept, four pendentives support the entablature and the hemispherical dome, crowned by a lantern. The pendentives are adorned with frescoes of the Four Evangelists, painted by Domenico Muzzi between 1793 and 1794. Muzzi also created the contemporaneous dome painting, depicting the Coronation of the Virgin among Prophets, Patriarchs, and Saints in Glory, featuring about one hundred figures spiraling toward the summit among clouds.

==== Chapels ====
Each side aisle opens, through wide arches, to six lateral chapels, with the largest located at the transept.

===== Right side =====
On the right, the first chapel, with a barrel vault and dedicated to Saint Pius V, houses a marble altar sculpted by Domenico Della Meschina between 1790 and 1793. The altar table, adorned with a gray marble antependium, is surmounted by a tabernacle shaped like a small Corinthian temple. Above rises the altarpiece, framed by two Corinthian columns supporting a triangular pediment, topped with two angel sculptures. Within it is the altarpiece depicting Saints Pius and Bernard with Other Dominican Saints, painted by Pietro Pedroni in Rome in 1780 on Ferdinand’s commission. On either side, within frames crafted by Ignazio Marchetti, are four ovals depicting Saint Ignatius the Confessor, Saint Didacus the Confessor, Saint Sylvester the Pope Confessor, and Saint Anthony of Padua the Confessor, painted by Antonio Bresciani between 1773 and 1793. Adjacent is a space that, until the mid-20th century, housed the polychrome terracotta sculpture of the Deposition from the Tomb, crafted by Laurent Guyard in 1775.

The second chapel, barrel-vaulted and dedicated to the holy relics, features a marble altar sculpted by Della Meschina between 1790 and 1793. The table, supported by two small pilasters, is topped with an Ionic temple-shaped tabernacle. Above rises the altarpiece, framed by two Corinthian columns supporting two telamons depicting Angels, crowned by a triangular pediment. Within it, two glass reliquaries are placed in niches separated by pilasters on two levels marked by a semicircular pediment: the simpler lower one, set on a tuff slab from a Roman-era catacomb, contains the remains of Saint Aconia; the upper one, crowned by an elaborately carved wooden finial by Ignazio Marchetti, houses the body of Saint Prima. On either side, within frames by Marchetti, are four ovals depicting Saint Paul the Hermit, Saint John Nepomuk, Saint Mary Magdalene de' Pazzi, and Saint Januarius, Bishop and Martyr, painted by Bresciani between 1773 and 1779.

The third chapel, barrel-vaulted and dedicated to Saint Joseph and the Holy Family, features a marble altar sculpted by Della Meschina between 1790 and 1792. The table, adorned with a polychrome marble antependium, is topped with a tabernacle shaped like a small temple, crowned by a small niche containing a wooden statuette of the Child Jesus, crafted by Pietro Viganò in the second half of the 18th century. Above rises the altarpiece frame, framed by two Composite columns supporting a broken triangular pediment, containing a medallion framed by two pilasters and a triangular tympanum. Within it is the altarpiece depicting the Holy Family with Saints Francis and Augustine, painted by Pietro Melchiorre Ferrari in 1780. On either side, within frames by Marchetti, are four ovals depicting Saint Francis Solanus, Saint Margaret of Cortona, Saint Francis of Paola, and Saint Berthold of Parma, painted by Bresciani between 1773 and 1779.

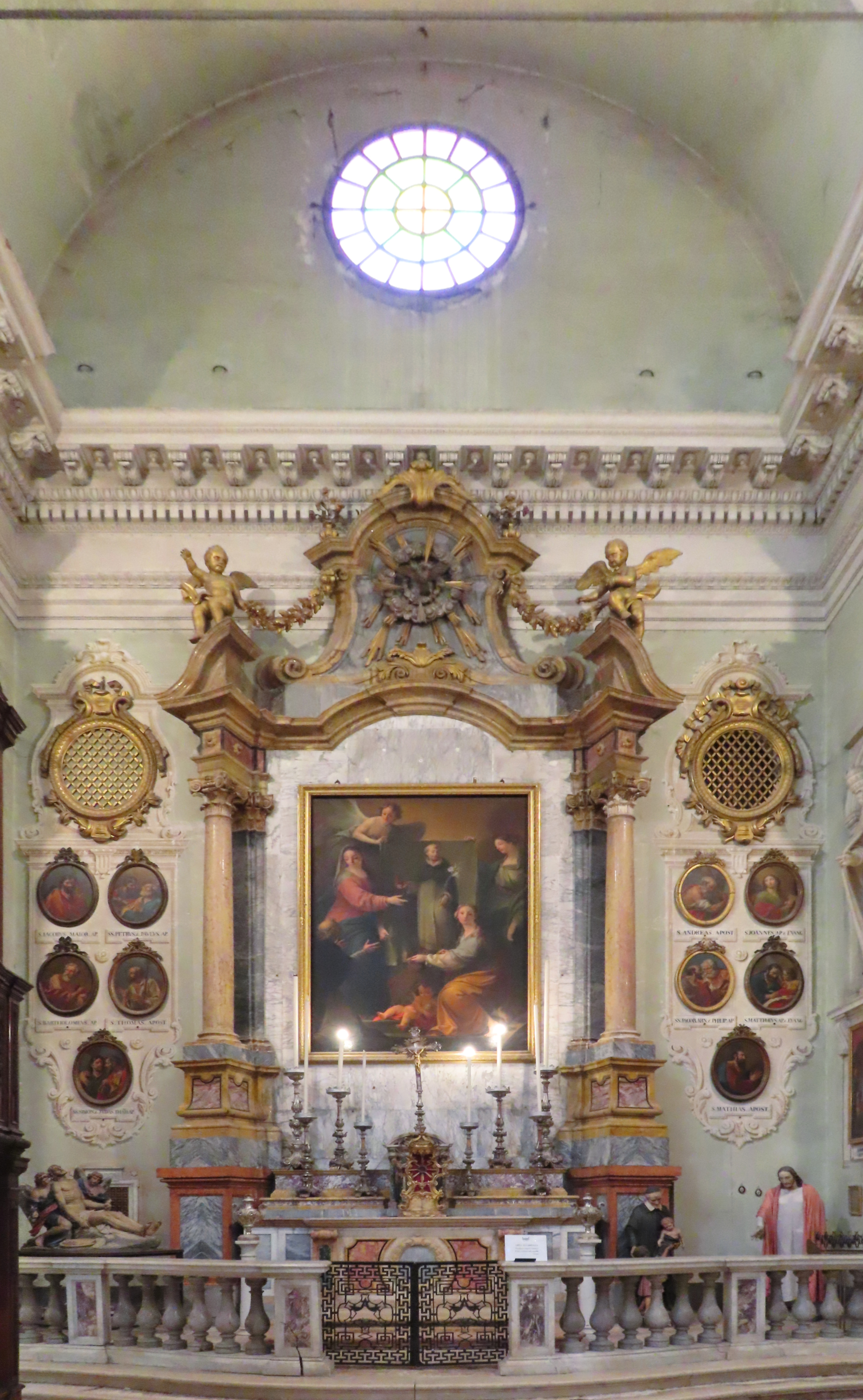
Chapel of Saint Dominic

The large fourth chapel, located at the transept and barrel-vaulted, is dedicated to Saint Dominic and houses a marble altar sculpted by Della Meschina between 1790 and 1792. The table, adorned with a polychrome marble antependium, is topped with a Corinthian temple-shaped tabernacle with bronze decorations. Above rises an altarpiece crafted between 1775 and 1777 by the same sculptor, framed by two Corinthian columns supporting a broken mixed-line pediment, within which stands a Rococo wooden finial by Della Meschina’s workshop, featuring a central medallion of the Dove of the Holy Spirit flanked by two volutes adorned with garlands and two angel statues. The altarpiece depicts the Apparition of Saint Dominic in Soriano, painted by Benigno Bossi in 1781. On either side, within frames by Marchetti, are ten ovals depicting the apostles, painted by Bresciani between 1773 and 1779: on the right are Saint Andrew the Apostle, Saint John the Apostle and Evangelist, Saints James the Less and Philip the Apostles, Saint Matthew the Apostle and Evangelist, and Saint Matthias the Apostle, while on the left are Saint James the Great, Saints Peter and Paul the Apostles, Saint Bartholomew the Apostle, Saint Thomas the Apostle, and Saints Simon and Jude Thaddaeus the Apostles. On the right side wall is a canvas depicting Saint Louis of France Giving the Crown of Thorns to Blessed Bartholomew of Breganze, painted by Domenico Muzzi between 1790 and 1799, surmounted by a niche containing a plaster statue of the Blessed Benedict XI, crafted by Gaetano Cignaroli between 1789 and 1793. Further along, above the side aisle, is an oil painting of Saint Alberto da Bergamo Praying, also by Muzzi between 1790 and 1799. On the left side wall is a late 18th-century canvas of the Blessed Giovanni Buralli, surmounted by a niche with a plaster statue of Saint Pius V, also by Cignaroli between 1789 and 1793. Further along, above the side aisle, is an oil painting of the Blessed Ursuline of Parma, from the late 18th century. On one side is the terracotta sculptural group of the Deposition from the Tomb, crafted by Guyard in 1775 for the space adjacent to the Saint Pius V chapel.

The fifth chapel, featuring a barrel vault and dedicated to Saint Vincent Ferrer, retains its original 1792 polychrome marble floor arranged in geometric patterns. The late 18th-century altar, adorned with a polychrome marble frontal, supports several intricately carved wooden candelabra with four and five arms, dating to approximately 1792. Above, the altarpiece, framed by a retablo, displays the Miracle of Saint Vincent Ferrer, painted by Laurent Pécheux in Turin between 1777 and 1779, commissioned by Ferdinand. Flanking the altarpiece, within frames crafted by Marchetti, are four oval paintings depicting Saint John the Baptist, Saint Maurus the Abbot, Saint Margaret and the Guardian Angel, created by Bresciani between 1773 and 1779. On one side, a processional banner portrays the Madonna with Child and Saint Roch, also painted by Bresciani around 1775.

The sixth chapel, covered by a barrel vault and dedicated to the Crucifix, houses a marble altar sculpted between 1780 and 1790. The altar table, decorated with a polychrome marble frontal, is supported by two corbels and surmounted by a tabernacle shaped like a small Ionic temple. Above, the retablo, framed by two Corinthian columns supporting a crowning architrave, holds two sculptures of cherubs bearing the face of Christ. Within the retablo, a large semicircular niche contains a substantial wooden crucifix, dating to around 1700, originally from the demolished Church of San Pietro Martire in Parma. On either side are two paintings depicting Christ in the Garden of Gethsemane and Christ Scourged, executed by Francesco Curradi in the first half of the 17th century, possibly for the Certosa di Parma.

Above the door at the end of the right nave, a painting depicts Saint Homobonus, created by Pietro Melchiorre Ferrari around 1780.

===== Left side =====
On the left, the first chapel, barrel-vaulted and dedicated to Saint Roch or Saint Bernard, features a marble altar likely sculpted by Domenico Della Meschina between 1789 and 1792. The altar table, adorned with a polychrome marble frontal, is surmounted by a tabernacle. Above, the retablo, framed by two columns and two Corinthian semi-columns supporting a crowning cornice, includes a semicircular lunette decorated with medallions, containing a high relief depicting two angels bearing the coats of arms of Saints Bernard and Roch. Within the retablo, the altarpiece portrays Saint Bernard Blessing Parma, Surrounded by Patron Saints, painted by Domenico Muzzi around 1780. Flanking it, within frames crafted by Ignazio Marchetti, are four oval paintings depicting Saint Stephen, Saint Agatha, Saints Lucy, Apollonia, and Blaise and Saint Aloysius Gonzaga, painted by Antonio Bresciani between 1773 and 1779.

The second chapel, covered by a barrel vault and dedicated to Saints Hyacinth and Rose, houses a marble altar sculpted by Della Meschina between 1789 and 1793. The altar table, decorated with a polychrome marble frontal, is surmounted by a tabernacle shaped like a small temple. Above, the retablo, framed by two Ionic pilasters supporting a crowning architrave, features a central semicircular pediment with sculptures of cherubs. Within the retablo, the altarpiece depicts Saints Rose, Hyacinth, and Catherine of Siena, painted by Princess Maria Antonia of Parma and her teacher Domenico Muzzi around 1780. Flanking it, within frames by Marchetti, are four oval paintings depicting Saint Francis Xavier, Saint Eurosia, Saint Amantius and Saint Irene, painted by Bresciani between 1773 and 1779.

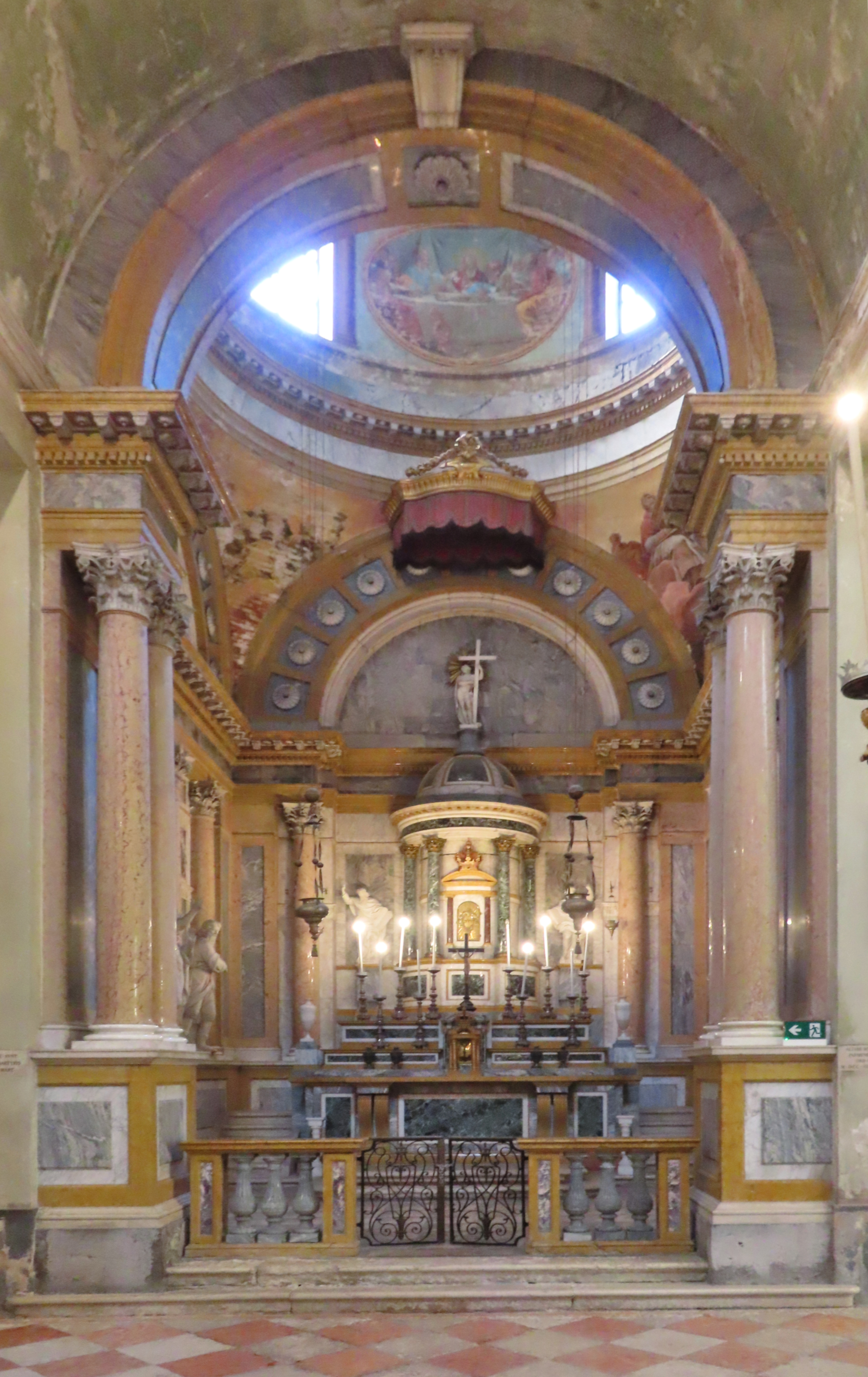
Chapel of the Blessed Sacrament

The third chapel, dedicated to the Blessed Sacrament, is built on a square plan and features elaborate neoclassical marble decoration, crafted by Domenico Della Meschina based on a design by an unknown architect, identified by historians as either Pietro Cugini or Donnino Ferrari. The space is preceded by a balustrade in polychrome marble and a triumphal arch with a semicircular span, supported by two pairs of Corinthian columns in red Verona marble, surmounted by a perimeter entablature in yellow marble and bardiglio. The side walls, clad in Carrara marble, are articulated by four Corinthian columns, defining three green marble panels on each side, where three white marble statues by Giuseppe Maria Castelpoggi, created in 1793, depict the biblical figures Amos, David, Ezekiel, Isaiah, Malachi and Zechariah. At the top, above the entablature, two large semicircular lunettes rise. At the rear, the altar, entirely crafted by Della Meschina in polychrome marble, possibly sourced, according to some scholars, from the Domus Tiberiana on the Palatine Hill in Rome, features a table decorated with a green marble frontal, surmounted by a tabernacle shaped like a small temple. Above, supported by four green marble columns with bronze Corinthian capitals, stands a ciborium with a semicircular base, covered by a marble dome, crowned by a statue of Christ Carrying the Cross, executed by Castelpoggi. At the center is a large tabernacle, framed by two red marble columns supporting a semicircular yellow marble pediment. Flanking the ciborium are two additional statues by Castelpoggi, depicting Moses and Elijah. On either side of the altar, two symmetrical staircases lead to the base of the ciborium, where, behind two tall Carrara marble vases sculpted by Della Meschina, two columns with Corinthian capitals support a large semicircular arch decorated with marble medallions. At the keystone, a richly carved gilded wooden baldachin, crafted by Ignazio Marchetti in 1793, is suspended. From the corners of the perimeter entablature rise four pendentives painted with depictions of Dominican Saints, supporting a drum enriched with a marble band containing four windows alternating with four medallions depicting mythological scenes. Crowning the chapel is a wide hemispherical dome, adorned with a fresco of the Glory of Angels, painted by Domenico Muzzi in 1793.

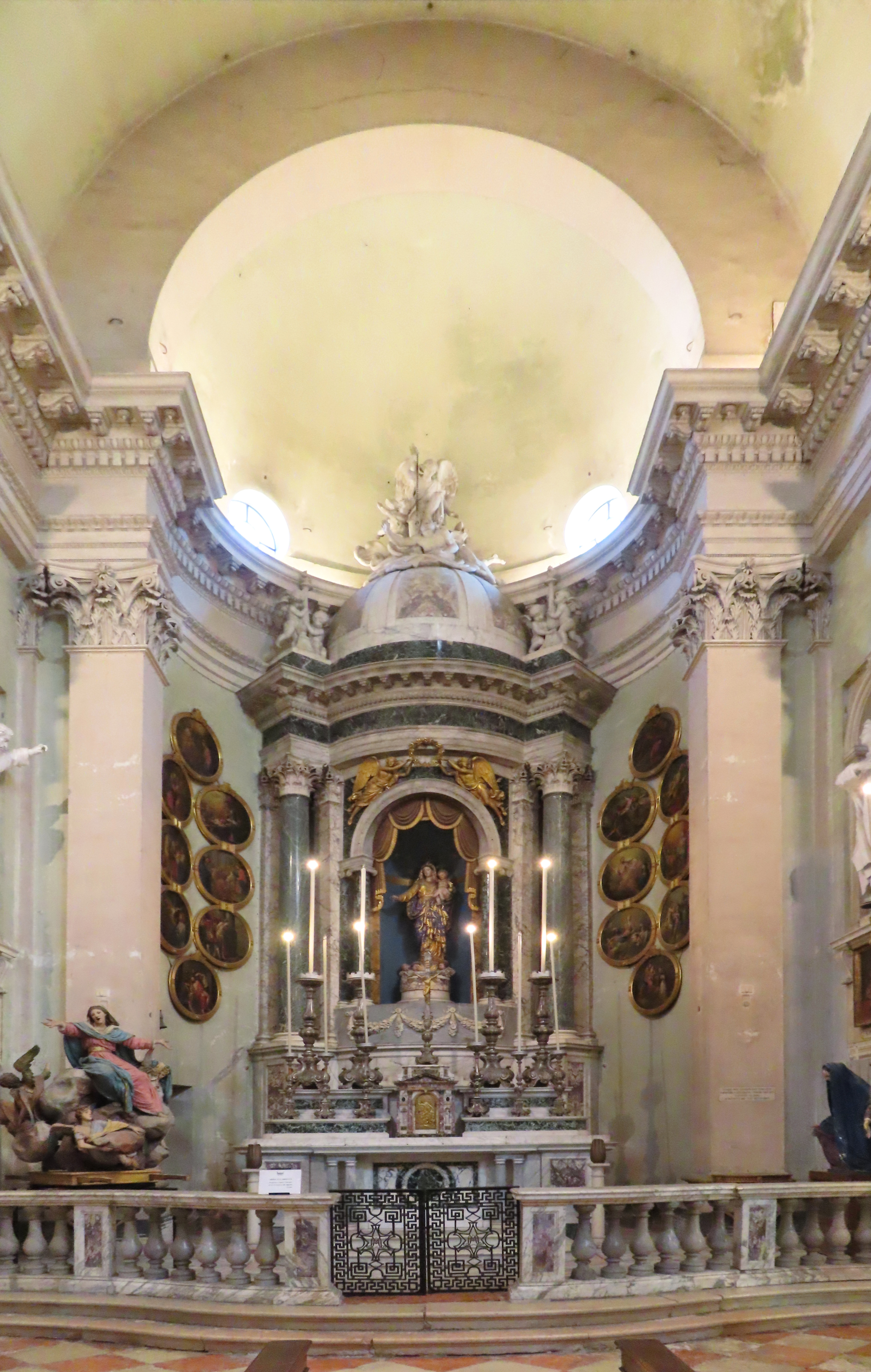
Chapel of the Blessed Virgin of the Rosary

The spacious fourth chapel, located at the transept and covered by a barrel vault before a triumphal arch supported by Corinthian pilasters and a semi-dome in the apse area, is dedicated to the Blessed Virgin of the Rosary. At the rear, a marble altar sculpted by Della Meschina in 1796 features a table decorated with a polychrome marble frontal, framed by two pairs of twin columns, and surmounted by a tabernacle shaped like a small temple with bronze columns. It is flanked by two small niches containing marble statuettes of Moses and another prophet. Above, a marble retablo with an elliptical plan, framed by two Corinthian columns supporting an entablature, is crowned by a stucco statue of Saint Michael Crushing the Demon, attributed to Gaetano Cignaroli, with two white marble sculptures of Pairs of Cherubs on either side. The retablo encloses a semicircular niche, framed by two Ionic columns, containing a polychrome wooden statue of the Madonna with Child, crafted by Pietro Viganò between 1790 and 1796. The statue is concealed by a canvas curtain, painted by Gaetano Callani between 1796 and 1799 with the depiction of the Marian Monogram. Flanking the retablo, within two sets of eight wooden oval frames, are sixteen small oil paintings by Callani from 1796, depicting the Madonna of the Rosary with Saint Dominic and the fifteen Mysteries of the Rosary: the Annunciation, the Visitation, the Nativity of Jesus, the Circumcision of Jesus, the Disputation of Jesus with the Doctors of the Temple, the Agony of Christ in the Garden of Gethsemane, the Flagellation of Christ, the Crowning with Thorns, the Ascent of Christ to Mount Calvary, the Crucifixion of Christ, the Resurrection of Christ, the Ascension of Christ, the Pentecost, the Coronation of the Virgin Mary and the Assumption of the Virgin.

On the right side wall, before the triumphal arch, a painting depicts the Virgin of the Seven Sorrows, dating to the early 19th century and is surmounted by a niche containing a plaster statue of Saint Dominic, executed by Gaetano Cignaroli between 1789 and 1793. Further along, above the side aisle, an oil painting depicts the Blessed Pietro Geremia of Palermo Praying to Avert a Fire, created by Pietro Melchiorre Ferrari in 1785. On the left side wall, a painting depicts Saint Philomena, dating to the early 19th century and is surmounted by a niche containing a plaster statue of Saint Catherine of Siena, also executed by Cignaroli between 1789 and 1793. Further along, above the side aisle, an oil painting depicts the Blessed John of Salerno Baptizing, created by Ferrari in 1785. On one side, a sculpted group in painted papier-mâché depicting the Assumption of the Virgin with Angels, created by Callani between 1791 and 1795, rests on a gilded and carved wooden processional base.

The fifth chapel, barrel-vaulted and dedicated to Saint Thomas Aquinas and the Dominican Saints, houses a marble altar sculpted between 1780 and 1790. The altar table, adorned with a wooden frontal, is surmounted by a tabernacle shaped like a small Ionic temple. Above, the retablo, framed by two Ionic columns supporting a broken semicircular pediment, features a medallion at its apex. Within the retablo, the altarpiece depicts Dominican Saints Thomas Aquinas, Peter Martyr, Teresa, Louis of France, and Ferdinand of Castile Adoring the Statue of Faith, painted by Giuseppe Baldrighi in 1780. Flanking it, within frames by Marchetti, are four oval paintings depicting Saint Michael the Archangel, Saint Cecilia, Saint Lawrence the Deacon and Saints Fabian and Sebastian, painted by Bresciani between 1773 and 1779.

The deep sixth chapel, dedicated to the Holy Relics and entirely crafted by various artists in 1786 based on a design by architect Donnino Ferrari, is structured on two levels connected by two side staircases. The space is preceded by a staircase leading to a semicircular triumphal arch supported by two Doric columns. Below, at the center, a wooden altar, supported by two fluted pilasters, contains a glass reliquary that housed the remains of Blessed Stephana de Quinzanis until 1986, when they were transferred to the Church of San Giacomo in Soncino. The altar is surmounted by a wooden tabernacle shaped like a small temple. The side walls are adorned with tempera paintings depicting Blessed Stephana Receiving the Stigmata and the Death of Blessed Stephana, almost certainly executed by Antonio Bresciani in 1786, within contemporary quadratures by Gaetano Ghidetti. The barrel vault ceiling features a large curvilinear frame by Ghidetti, containing a depiction of the Trinity, also by Bresciani. Two wooden side staircases with wrought iron railings lead to the upper chamber, enclosed by a gate adorned with Bourbon emblems at the top, crafted by Benedetto Silvestre in 1786. The rectangular space houses a large gilded wooden shelving unit along three walls, carved by Ignazio Verstrackt in 1786. The shelving, articulated by small pilasters, is covered by a curtain, at the center of which is a contemporary painting of Blessed Stephana and Angels, attributed to Antonio Bresciani or, according to some scholars, Pietro Rotari. The shelves house numerous reliquaries, including a richly carved rococo wooden display from the second half of the 18th century, a 1786 urn containing the remains of Saint Clement and a late 18th-century tablet-shaped reliquary crafted by Ignazio Marchetti. Crowning the space, on four pendentives, is an elliptical-based dome with a lantern, adorned with a tempera painting of the Glory of Angels by Bresciani, set within quadratures by Ghidetti.

Above the door at the end of the left nave, a painting depicts Saint Marinus, created by Benigno Bossi in 1780.

==== Sanctuary ====
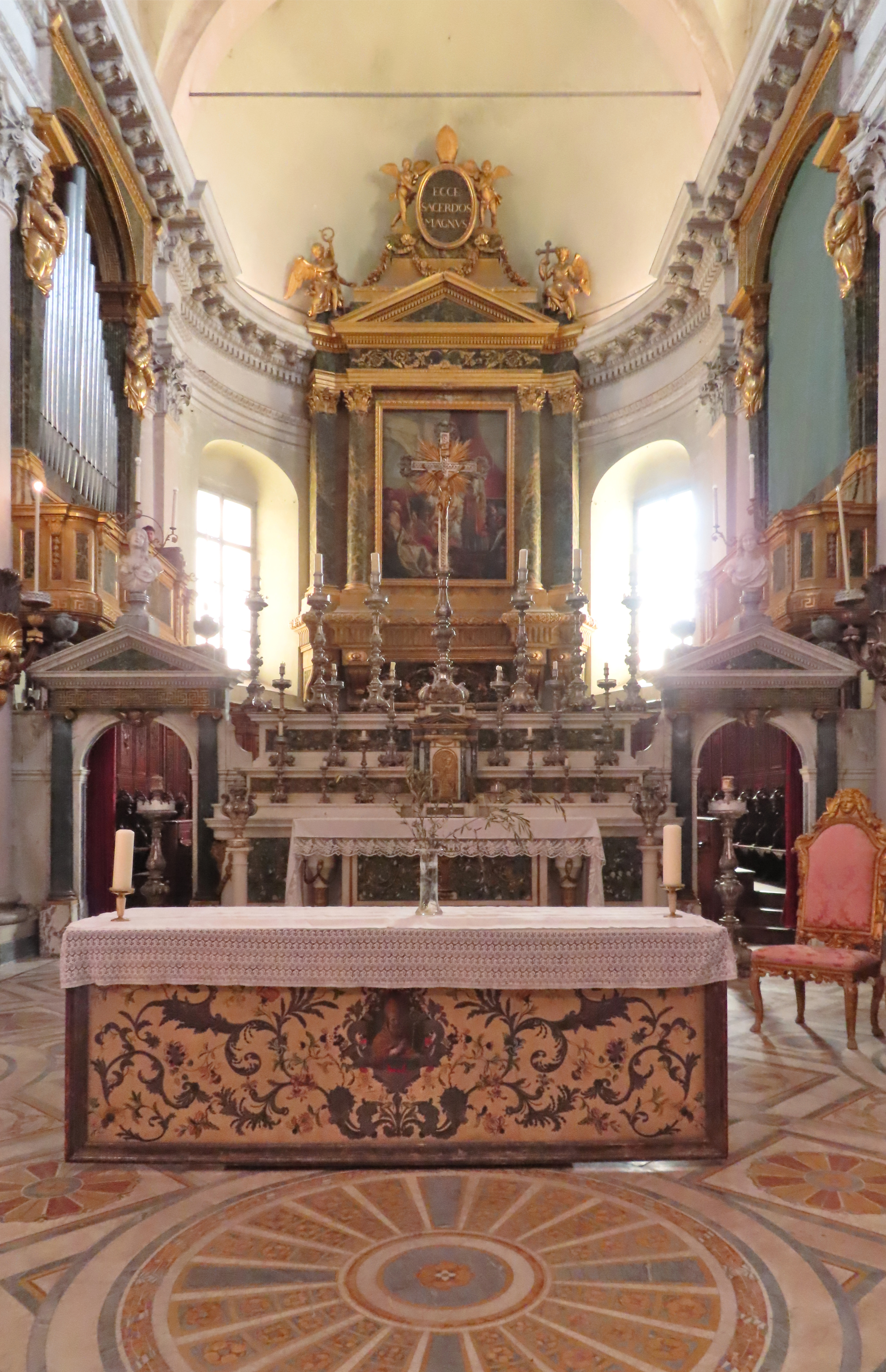
Sanctuary

The sanctuary, entirely constructed in 1792 based on a design by architect Donnino Ferrari, features a richly inlaid polychrome marble floor, slightly elevated above the nave.

At the center is the post-conciliar main altar table. At the rear, elevated by a few steps, stands the original main marble altar, sculpted by Domenico Della Meschina. The altar table, adorned with a green marble frontal, is supported by two vase-shaped columns decorated with bronze garlands. Above, a tabernacle shaped like a small Corinthian temple, is enclosed by a semicircular bronze door sculpted with the Resurrection of Christ, executed by Giuseppe Sbravati. Flanking it are two bronze statuettes representing the allegories of Faith and Hope, also by Sbravati, who also created the sculptural group crowning the tabernacle’s pediment, depicting Angels with a Lamb.

Aligned with the original altar, on each side, a marble portal with a semicircular arch, framed by two Ionic columns supporting a bronze architrave and a triangular pediment, is crowned by two gray marble vases by Della Meschina at the pediment’s extremities, and a central Carrara marble bust of a Saint by Gaetano Cignaroli.

The side walls, articulated by Corinthian semi-columns, feature two symmetrical gilded wooden consoles, carved by Michel Poncet between 1779 and 1793. Higher up, two semicircular niches contain plaster statues of Saint Peter and Saint Paul, crafted by Cignaroli.

The space is enclosed above by a lunetted barrel vault, continuous with the nave. At the center of the ceiling, above the original main altar, hangs a richly carved rococo-style gilded wooden baldachin, crafted by Ignazio Marchetti between 1789 and 1792.

At the rear, behind the original altar, extends the apsidal choir. The spacious area features a floor of long wooden planks arranged in panels, installed in 1777 for the second Ducal Chapel of San Liborio. Along the walls is the choir, crafted in 1777 by Michel Poncet, Ignazio Marchetti, and Giovanni Prati, and extended in 1792 by Poncet, Marchetti, Giuseppe Sbravati, and Carlo Gianetti to fit the new apse. The fifty wooden stalls, arranged on two levels and articulated by volutes crowned with lion heads, feature upper backrests adorned with panels and divided by Corinthian pilasters. A richly carved high entablature crowns the structure. At the center is a rotating lectern for the choir, crafted by Poncet, Marchetti, and Prati in 1777, adorned with sculptures of lion heads. Crowning it is a wooden statuette of David Playing the Harp, attributed to Poncet or Sbravati.

At the back of the apse, between two large windows, stands a monumental gilded wooden altarpiece, painted to resemble green marble, crafted in 1792 by Marchetti based on a design by Donnino Ferrari. The structure, supported by four volutes, rises from a tall, intricately carved base and is framed by a Corinthian column and pilaster on each side. At the top, it is crowned by an entablature, surmounted by a triangular pediment with a projecting cornice. At the pinnacle, a large central medallion bears the inscription "Ecce Sacerdos Magno". Flanking it are two sculptures of flying cherubs, created by Sbravati, who also crafted the two pairs of angels positioned at the extremities. Within the altarpiece is a large canvas depicting the Sermon of Saint Liborius, painted between 1776 and 1777 by Gaetano Callani. This work anticipated the distinctive characteristics of Neoclassicism, moving beyond the prevailing Baroque conventions of the period.

On the side walls, between two pairs of Corinthian half-columns, two symmetrical choir lofts open up, carved in 1792 by Ignazio Verstrackt based on a design by an unknown architect, identified by historians as possibly Ennemond Alexandre Petitot, Donnino Ferrari, or Pietro Cugini. Each loft, made of gilded wood and painted to mimic green marble, features a parapet with a curvilinear profile, articulated by pilasters. At the ends, two pilasters topped with telamons support Ionic capitals, which in turn uphold a broad flattened arch. Inside the left choir loft is the Serassi organ.

===== Serassi organ =====
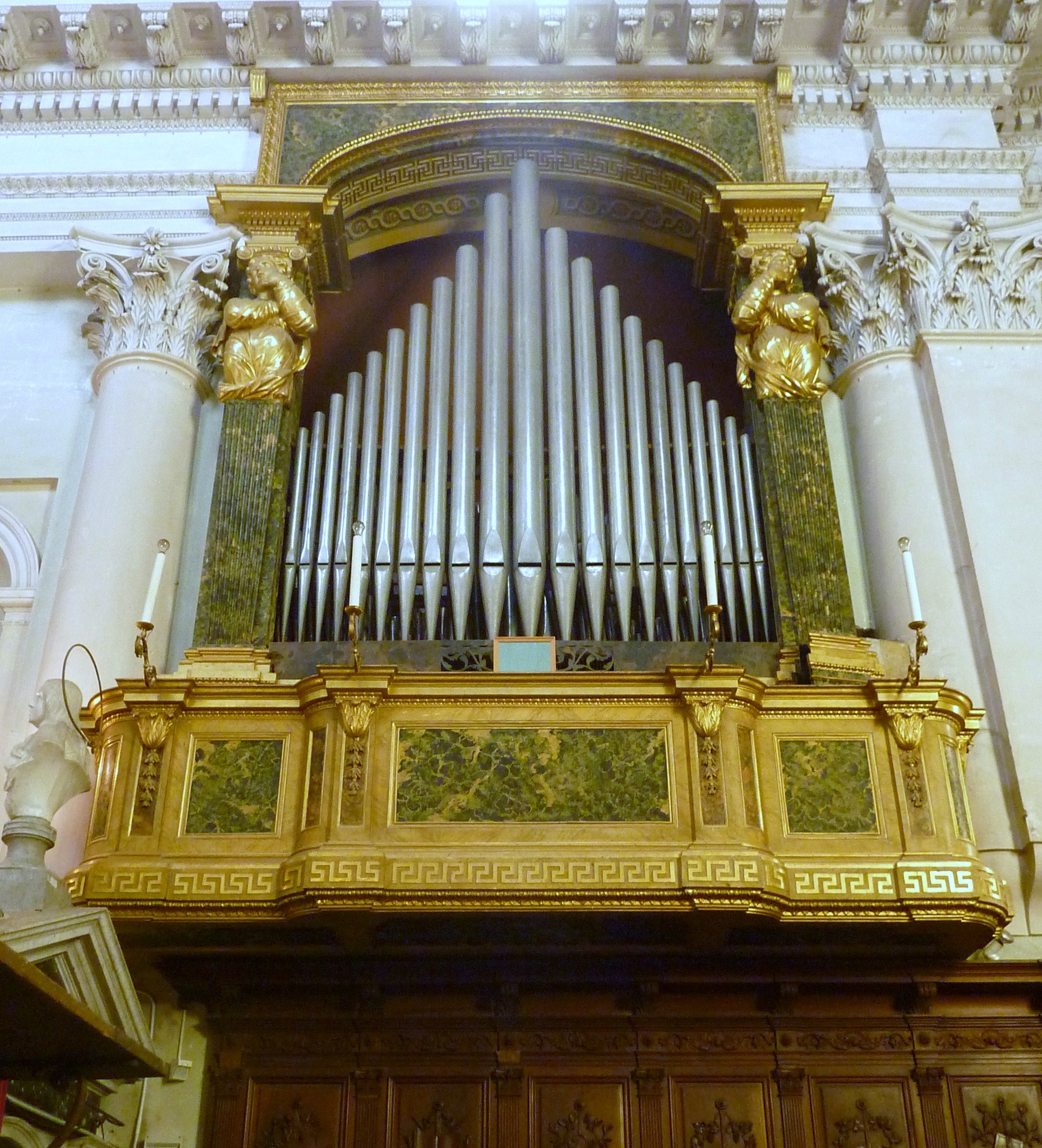
Serassi organ

The monumental organ, commissioned by Duke Ferdinand, was built between 1792 and 1796 by the brothers Andrea and Giuseppe Serassi, replacing a smaller instrument constructed by Giovanni Cavalletti in 1777. It stood out immediately among the works of the Bergamasque organ builders for its considerable size and innovative features, including the first-time introduction of stops. Following the Unification of Italy, with the transfer of the Ducal Palace and its appurtenances to the state, the organ, previously maintained in perfect condition by appointed organ builders, was neglected for decades. Untouched by alterations, it was fully restored in 1984 by the Tamburini firm of Crema and solemnly inaugurated on 5 May 1985 with concerts that gave rise to the annual "L'organo ritrovato" series, replaced in 2015 by the Serassi Festival.

The instrument comprises three sections: the main organ, the echo organ, and the third organ. It is equipped with two keyboards, a lectern-style pedalboard, eight bellows, and 2,898 pipes, all made of tin and distributed across 68 stops. The facade features 21 pipes arranged in a cusped formation.

==== Sacristy ====
The door at the end of the left nave leads to the ante-sacristy, where a carved Baroque frame from the 17th century, containing a 19th-century oil painting, is preserved. Additionally, fifteen 18th-century glass-mounted engravings depicting the Twelve Apostles and three evangelists, created by Marco Alvise Pitteri, are housed there.

The ante-sacristy opens into the sacristy, designed on a square plan and divided transversely by two Doric colonnades into three aisles, with the central one covered by a lunette-vaulted ceiling. At the far end, a marble altar sculpted by Domenico Della Meschina in 1794 stands on a few steps. The altar table, supported by two brackets, is surmounted by a tabernacle shaped like a small temple. Above it rises the altarpiece, framed by two Ionic pilasters supporting a semicircular pediment. Within the altarpiece is a canvas depicting the Sorrowful Virgin, painted by Domenico Muzzi between 1790 and 1799. Flanking it are two wooden busts representing Saint Dominic and Saint Catherine of Siena, crafted by Giuseppe Sbravati in 1777.

The side walls symmetrically house two large double-bodied wooden cabinets, carved by Michel Poncet and Ignazio Marchetti based on a design by Donnino Ferrari. These cabinets contain liturgical objects and vestments, including a table crucifix made of jasper and bronze by the Poncet workshop in the second half of the 18th century, a wooden plaque of the Confraternity of Saint Roch, carved by Marchetti in 1775, an altar frontal in painted wood depicting Saint Liborius Bishop, created by Domenico Muzzi between 1760 and 1770, a liturgical book cover embroidered in gold from 1763, various chalices, vases, monstrances, ciboria, altar cards, and 18th-century silver exposition stands, as well as numerous embroidered copes, chasubles, stoles, surplices, albs, altar cloths, and umbracula from the 18th and 19th centuries.

The space also houses a canvas depicting Benedict XI, dating to the second half of the 18th century, two small 16th-century oils portraying the Announcing Angel and the Annunciated Virgin, a processional banner depicting the Virgin with Child and Saint Roch, painted by Antonio Bresciani in 1775, two small canvases reproducing Saint Dominic and the Miracle of Saint Dominic, created by Duke Ferdinand between 1765 and 1785, two 17th-century paintings depicting the Blessed Nicholas and Saint Anthelm and three silk altar frontals, one of which is adorned with a central stucco medallion depicting the Virgin with Child and Saint Dominic, crafted by Marchetti, likely in collaboration with Giovanni Prati, between 1760 and 1770.

== See also ==
- Ducal Palace of Colorno
- Francesco Farnese
- Ferdinand I, Duke of Parma
- Ennemond Alexandre Petitot
- Duchy of Parma and Piacenza
- Province of Parma

== Bibliography ==
- Dall'Acqua, Marzio, ed. (1999). Enciclopedia di Parma [Encyclopedia of Parma] (2 ed.). Parma: SEGEA spa (under license from FMR spa-Franco Maria Ricci).
- Quintavalle, Arturo Carlo, ed. (2020). Storia di Parma [History of Parma]. Vol. VIII. Parma: Monte Università Parma. ISBN 978-88-7847-588-5.
- Cirillo, Giuseppe; Godi, Giovanni (1986). Guida artistica del Parmense [Artistic Guide to the Parmense]. Vol. I. Parma: Artegrafica Silva.
- Dall'Aglio, Italo (1966). La Diocesi di Parma [The Diocese of Parma]. Vol. I. Parma: Scuola Tipografica Benedettina.
- Mordacci, Alessandra (2009). La Reggia di Colorno [The Palace of Colorno]. Castelli del parmense. Parma: Gazzetta di Parma.
- Pellegri, Marco (1981). Colorno Villa Ducale [Colorno Ducal Villa]. Parma: Cassa di Risparmio di Parma.
