= Antonio Bresciani =

Antonio Bresciani may refer to:

- Antonio Bresciani (artist), Italian painter and engraver
- Antonio Bresciani (writer), Italian Jesuit priest and writer
