= Pezzani =

Pezzani is an Italian surname. Notable people with the surname include:

- Gianni Pezzani (real name Giovanni Pezzani, born 1951), Italian photographer
- Renzo Pezzani (1898–1951), Italian poet and writer
