= Sant'Uldarico, Parma =

Church in Parma, Italy

Coordinates: 44°47′48.73″N 10°19′38.85″E

Church of st uldarico; Chiesa di Sant'Uldarico (Italian)
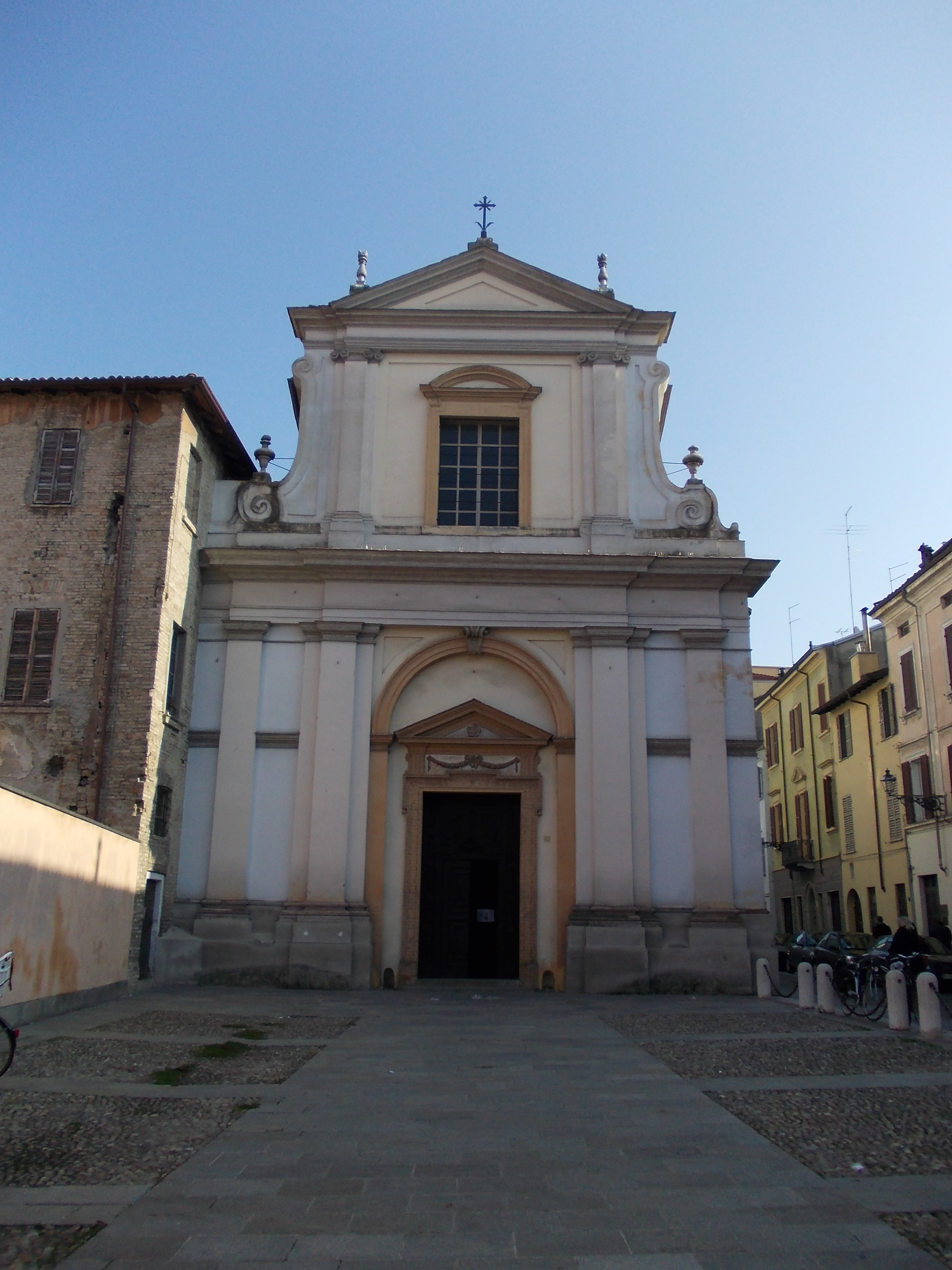

Religion
- Affiliation: Catholic
- Year consecrated: 1411

Location
- Location: Parma, Italy
- Interactive map of: Church of st uldarico; Chiesa di Sant'Uldarico (Italian)

Architecture
- Architect: Gaetano Ghidetti
- Style: Baroque
- Completed: facade (1762)

The church of Sant'Uldarico is located on Farini Street in Parma.

== History ==
The church of Sant'Uldarico was built on the site of ancient Roman theater, and initially consecrated in 1411. The present façade was completed in 1762 by Gaetano Ghidetti. The frescoes of the cupola and nave are by Antonio Bresciani. The church contains also paintings by Lionello Spada, Clemente Ruta, Giovanni Battista Borghesi, Girolamo Donini, and Giovanni Tebaldi. The choir stalls for the monks were commissioned in 1505 from Gian Giacomo Baruffi.
