= Ducal Palace of Colorno =

Palace in Emilia-Romagna, Italy

Coordinates: 44°55′48″N 10°22′37″E

- Palazzo ducale di Colorno
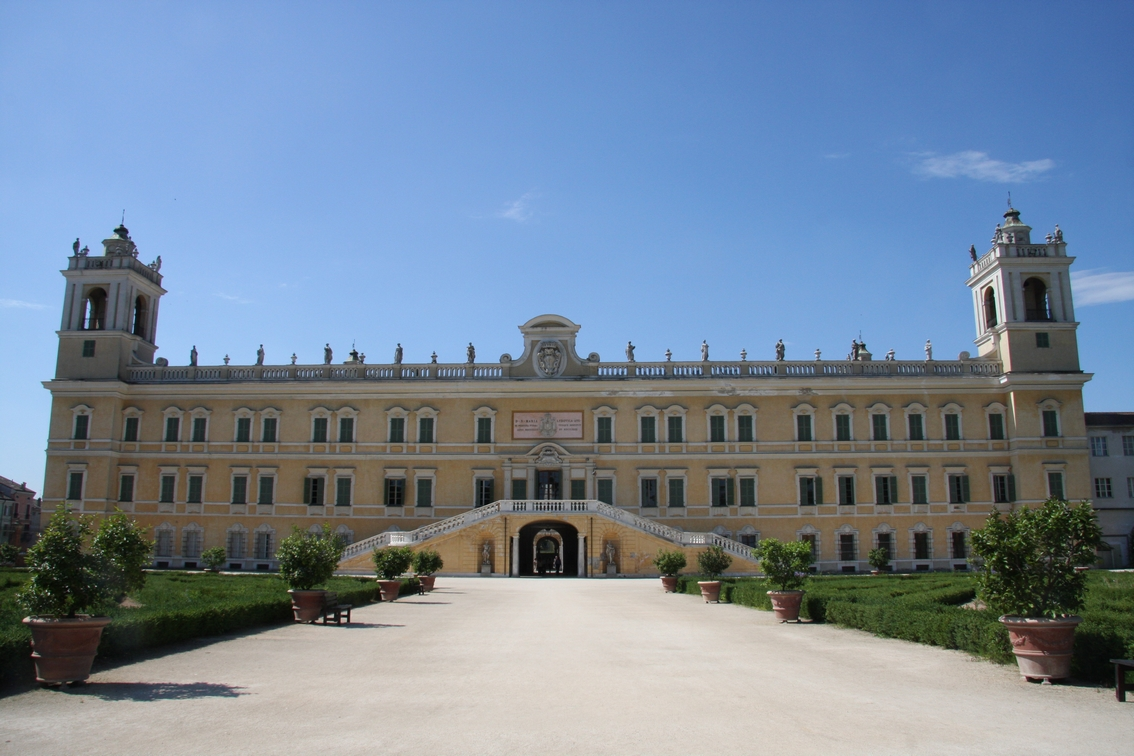
- Façade of the Ducal Palace of Colorno.
- Interactive map of the Ducal Palace of Colorno area
- Alternative names: Reggia di Colorno

General information
- Type: Palace
- Architectural style: Italian Baroque
- Location: Colorno, province of Parma
- Client: Francesco Farnese, Duke of Parma

Technical details
- Floor count: 3

Design and construction
- Architect: Ferdinando Galli-Bibiena Ennemond Alexandre Petitot

Website
- www.reggiadicolorno.it

The Ducal Palace, also known as Reggia di Colorno, is an edifice in the territory of Colorno, Emilia Romagna, Italy. The palace we see today was refurbished by Francesco Farnese, Duke of Parma in the early 18th century on the remains of a former castle.

== History ==
A square Rocca (castle) was built on the site by Azzo da Correggio as a defence along the Po River. It belonged to the Correggio and Terzi families, and in the 16th-17th centuries it was restored by countess Barbara Sanseverino, who desired a true palace for her court, and to house her prestigious collection of works by painters such as Raphael, Titian, Mantegna and Correggio. This collection was dispersed in following centuries.

After the beheading of Barbara Sanseverino by the Duke Ranuccio I Farnese, the palace was expropriated by the Duke. His son, Ranuccio II Farnese and his wife Margherita Violante began a complete reconstruction that was completed under their son Francesco, directed by architect Ferdinando Bibbiena.

The palace was the home of Enrichetta d'Este, widow of Antonio Farnese, Duke of Parma.

In the 18th century, Duke Philip commissioned its restoration by the French architect Ennemond Alexandre Petitot, and tried to emulate in the interior the decor of the Palace of Versailles. Philip was married to Princess Louise-Élisabeth of France, who was the eldest daughter of Louis XV of France. On November 28, 1807, after the annexation of the Duchy of Parma to the French Empire, the palace was declared "imperial property" and new restoration works were started. After the Congress of Vienna, the duchy went to Marie Louise, Napoleon's wife, who made the Reggia her favourite residence and created a wide English-style garden.

After the unification of Italy, it became a state possession, and in 1870 it was acquired by the province of Parma, and is now home to ALMA, a world-renowned Italian culinary school.

== The park ==
The first park dates from that of 1480, commissioned by count Roberto Sanseverino d'Aragona. Under Francesco Farnese it was renovated with a mix of French- and Italian-style landscape garden, which was further modified by Duchess Marie Louise.

Damaged during World War II, it has been recently returned to its antique splendour by a restoration.

== See also ==
- List of Baroque residences
- Ducal Palace of Parma
- Palazzo del Giardino
- Palazzo della Pilotta
- Palazzo di Riserva
- Castles of the Duchy
- Ducal Chapel of San Liborio

== Literature ==
- Pattera, Allegra (2021–2022). Le residenze, i giardini e le riserve di caccia ducali di Parma, Colorno e Sala. La valorizzazione dell'asse del verde dalla pianura alle colline attraverso un percorso di mobilità dolce (PDF) (Thesis). Turin: Politecnico di Torino. p. 487.
