= Gaetano Ghidetti =

Italian painter

Gaetano Ghidetti (6 April 1723, in Parma – 22 September 1792, in Parma) was an Italian scenic designer, quadratura painter, and architect.

== History ==
He trained with his father, a wood and frame artist, and began as a painter of architectural details. He worked on many architectural projects, including the facade of Sant'Uldarico, and the interiors of Sant'Antonio Abate. He is also known for his work as a scenic designer. In 1757, along with Antonio Malagoli, he painted the scenery for three operas: La buona figliuola, Catone in Utica, and Issipile. In 1758, he collaborated with Ruspaggiari to paint the decoration for the French ballet for the opera, Recimiro re de' Goti. Also in that year he decorated the Teatrino Ducale di Colorno. In 1760, he was paid 1548 lire for the scenes of I Tindaridi by Tommaso Traetta.

From 1774 to 1781, he made scenography in the Ducal Theater in Parma, working with Grassi. In 1781, he decorated the theater itself. He was made professor in the Parmesan Academy, and was knighted by the Duchy.
