= Palazzo Lechi, Montirone =

Coordinates: 45.4431°N 10.2281°E

The Palazzo Lechi, or more aptly also called Villa di Conti Lechi, is a rural palace located on via del Palazzo 60 in Montirone, Province of Brescia, region of Lombardy, Italy.

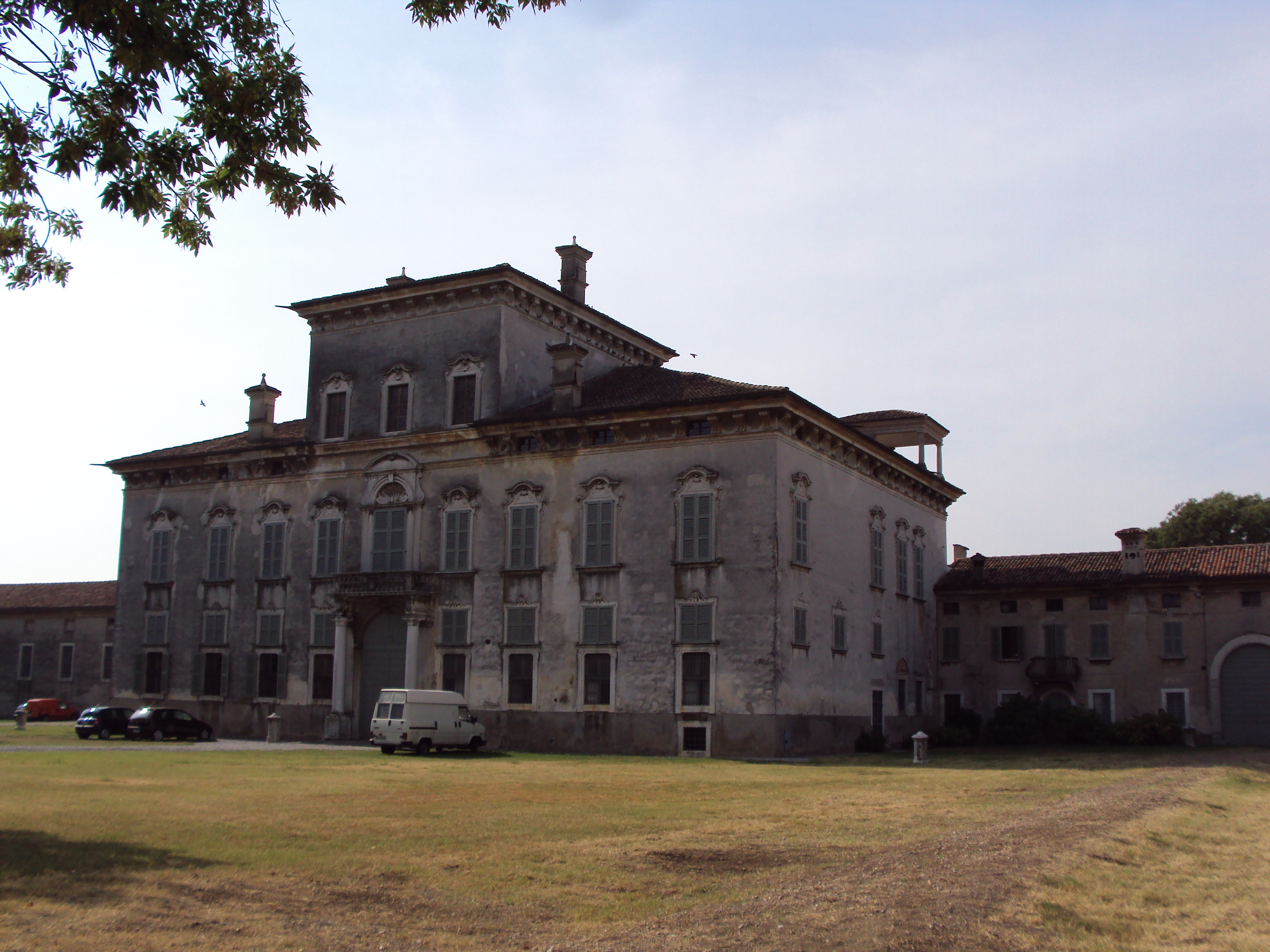
Palazzo Lechi

== History ==
The palace was commissioned by Count Pietro Lechi from the architect Marco Antonio Turbino, father of Gaspero Antonio Turbino. Construction took place between 1738 and 1746. The son would help design the gardens around the villa. The tall central structure has a porticoed courtyard with two recessed wings. The stables have columns (1755) decorated with Olympian gods or flower vases. The villa was frescoed by many

artists, including Pietro Scalvini, Giancarlo Galli Bibiena, the quadraturist Battaglioli, Francesco Zuccarelli, and Carlo Carloni. The villa chapel was decorated by Francesco Savanni. The main altarpiece was completed by Giovanni Battista Pittoni. Among the sculptors working in the palace were Alessandro and Antonio Callegari, Lorenzo Muttoni, and Rodolfo Vantini.

Many of the villa's movable artworks and music collection were looted during the Austrian-Russian invasion of 1799. Giuseppe Lechi of the family owning the villa, had served with the Austrian Army, but elected to join the French Republican forces, as well as fighting with Napoleon and later Murat.
