= Benigno Bossi =

Italian painter

Benigno Bossi (1727–1792) was an Italian engraver, painter, and stucco artist.

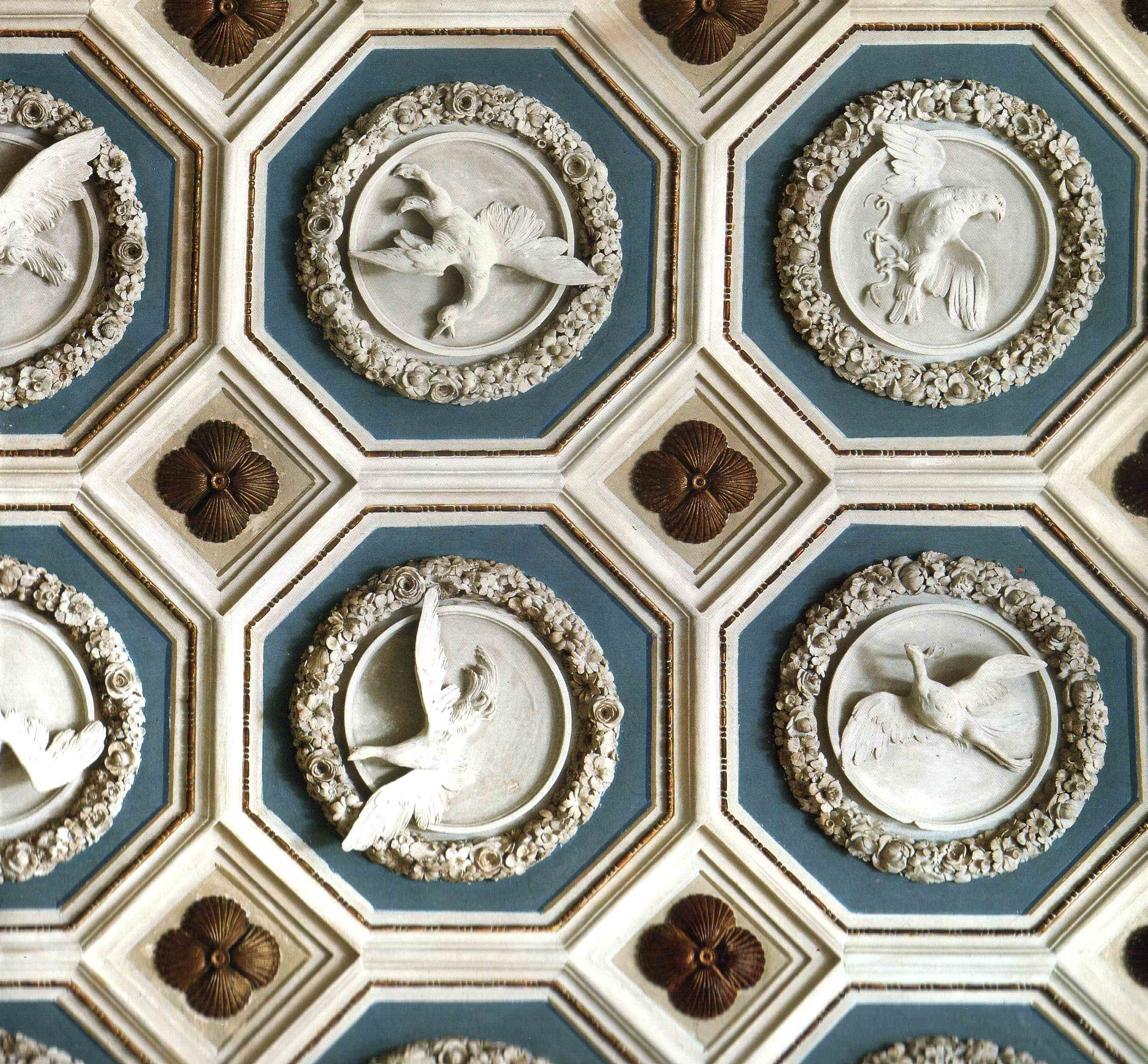
Sala degli Uccelli in Palazzo del Giardino in Parma with over 250 individualized stucco roundels depicting birds

== Life ==
He was born at Arcisate near Milan. He was intended to have studied painting under Pompeo Batoni, but that artist's death prevented it, and he was advised by Anton Raphael Mengs and Christian Wilhelm Ernst Dietrich to apply himself to engraving. He stayed for a time in Nuremberg and Dresden, but during the Seven Years' War he had to leave Saxony, and went in 1760 to Parma where he found patronage by the duke.

He died in Parma on 4 November 1792. Some sources appear to misspell his name as Benigno Rossi.

== Prints ==
He engraved the following prints:

1. Self-portrait.
2. A Presentation in the Temple (1755).
3. Forty small etchings of Heads, and other subjects.
4. A Mascarade à la Grecque and a Suite des Vases after Ennemond Alexandre Petitot.
5. Four of Trophies (1771).
6. Four of the Attributes of the Seasons (1770).
7. Two of children.
8. Allegorical figures representing the Towns in Piedmont.
9. A set of 29 plates after the drawings of Parmigianino.

== Bibliography ==
- Bryan, Michael (1886). Robert Edmund Graves (ed.). Dictionary of Painters and Engravers, Biographical and Critical. Vol. I A-K. London: George Bell and Sons. pp. 162–163.
