= Colorno =

- Comune
- Comune di Colorno
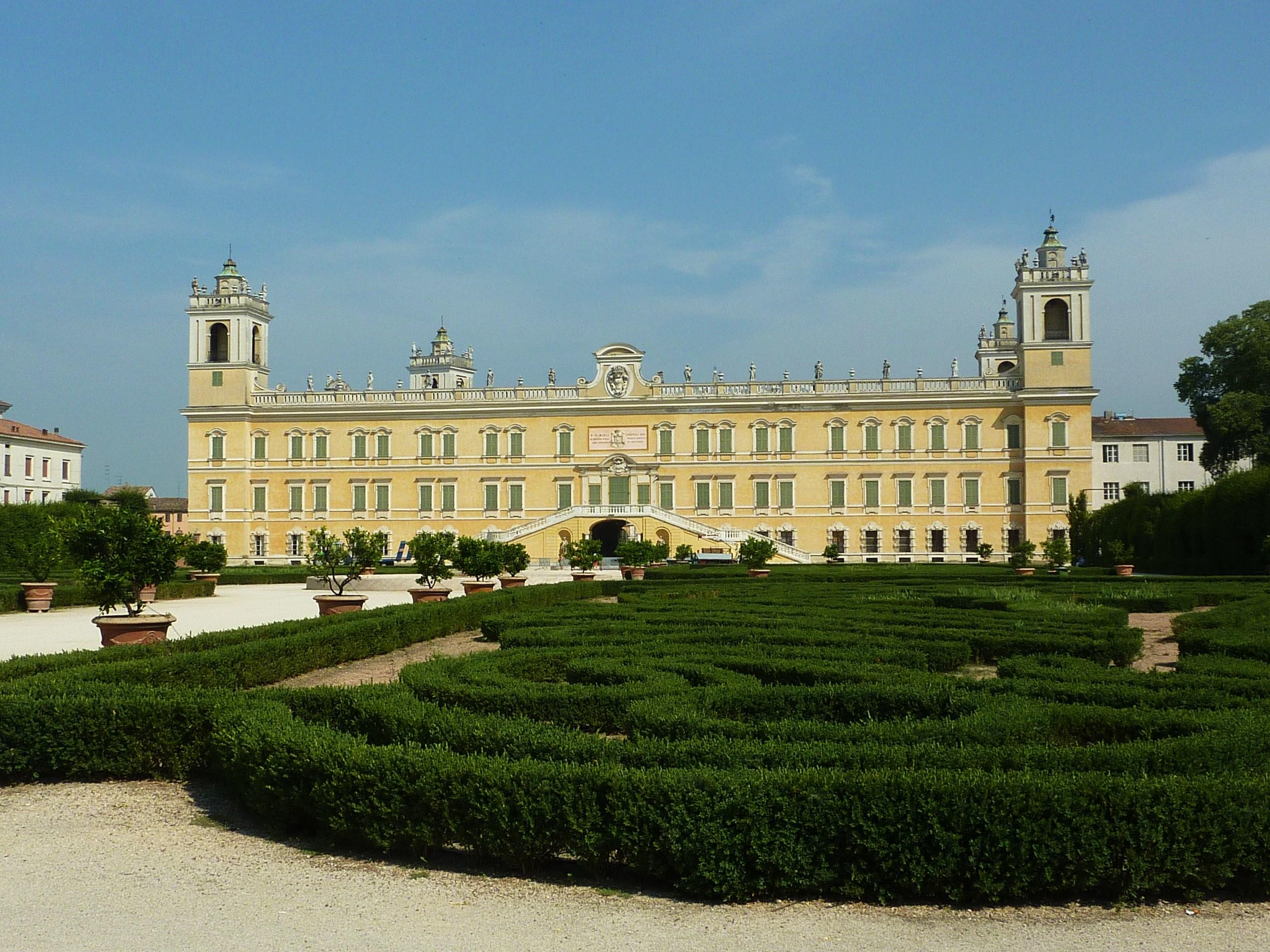
- Reggia di Colorno

- Location within Italy Location within Emilia-Romagna
- Coordinates: 44°56′N 10°23′E
- Country: Italy
- Region: Emilia-Romagna
- Province: Parma (PR)
- Frazioni: Argine, Ca'Basse, Cadassa, Casello, Chiesa, Copermio, Corte e Parrocchia, Mezzano Rondani, Osteria, Sacca, Sanguigna, Stazione, Trai, Vedole

Government
  - Mayor: Christian Stocchi

Area
  - Total: 48.41 km^{2} (18.69 sq mi)
- Elevation: 29 m (95 ft)

Population (30 June 2017)
  - Total: 8,988
  - Density: 185.7/km^{2} (480.9/sq mi)
- Demonym: Colornesi
- Time zone: UTC+1 (CET)
  - Summer (DST): UTC+2 (CEST)
- Postal code: 43052
- Dialing code: 0521
- Patron saint: St. Margaret
- Saint day: July 20
- Website: Official website

Colorno (Parmigiano: Colórni) is a comune (municipality) in the Province of Parma, within the Italian region of Emilia-Romagna. It is located about 90 kilometres (56 mi) northwest of Bologna and approximately 15 kilometres (9 mi) north of Parma.

Colorno borders the following municipalities: Casalmaggiore, Gussola, Martignana di Po, Mezzani, Sissa Trecasali, and Torrile.

== History ==
The history of Colorno begins around the year 1004 A.D., when the town is mentioned in a document that established the ownership of some properties of the bishopric of Parma. After the sale of property in favour of the municipality of Parma, Colorno is remembered as one of the few towns that resisted the advance of the Holy Roman Emperor Frederick II in 1247, when he led a campaign in order to punish the city of Parma for its infidelity. During the 14th and the 15th century the castle of Colorno and its surroundings were ruled by the House of Terzi, a noble family from Parma.

In 1458 Francesco I Sforza, Duke of Milan, awarded the feud of Colorno to Roberto Sanseverino d'Aragona and his descendants, whom ruled until 1612. In this period, many of the most important buildings of Colorno were constructed, as the Oratory of Saint Liborius and the Torre delle Acque.

With the death of Antonio Farnese, the Duchy of Parma passed to Charles III of Spain, and cause of the War of the Polish Succession, the 29th of June 1734 took place the Battle of Colorno, between Franco-Sardinian and Austrian troops. During the House of Bourbon period, Colorno reached its maximum splendor with some works by the famous artist Ennemond Alexandre Petitot and the laic politics of Guillaume du Tillot. An important addition was the construction of Cappella Ducale di San Liborio and the Venaria Reale one. After the Congress of Vienna, the Duchy of Parma was given to Napoleon's wife, Marie-Louise of Habsburg-Lorraine. Under her rule, the Ducal Palace of Colorno was expanded and embellished, making it her summer estate. After the death of the Duchess in 1847, the Duchy of Parma and Piacenza returned to the House of Bourbon-Parma, and so did Colorno.

Today Colorno is part of the Unione Bassa Est Parmense, an institution that brings together some municipalities in the East part of the Province of Parma.

== Main sights ==
The main attraction of Colorno is the Ducal Palace (Reggia), built in the 18th century for the Farnese family.

Other sights include:

- The Aranciaia, erected in 1710–1712 by Duke Francesco Farnese as a shelter for the orange and lemon trees that in summer decorated the Ducal Palace. It was designed by Ferdinando Galli Bibiena. It is currently the seat of the Museum of the Peasant Civilisation and Pre-Industrial Technology.
- The Water Tower (1718–1719).
- Santa Margherita – a church dating mainly to the 16th century.

== Cuisine ==
A typical dish from this town and area of the Province of Parma, is the Tortél Dóls, a kind of Ravioli with a bittersweet stuffing, whose origin goes back to the times of the Empress Marie-Louise of France, Duchess of Parma. Other typical dishes are the same as Parma, like anolini and tortelli d'erbetta, mostly eaten during the Christmas season.

== Notable people ==
- Gianni Pezzani, photographer
- Piero Schivazappa, film director
