= Gianni Pezzani =

Italian photographer (born 1951)

Gianni Pezzani (real name Giovanni Pezzani, born on 18 June 1951 in Colorno), is an Italian photographer.

== Biography ==
Gianni Pezzani was born in Colorno, a small town in the Province of Parma on 18 June 1951. He attended the University of Florence where in 1979 he graduated in agricultural sciences.

== Work ==
His knowledge of chemistry, learnt during his university studies, allowed him to undertake research on photographic toning in the late 1970s. This allowed him to be amongst the first photographers in Italy to become involved in the study of colour, freeing himself from the predominance of black-and-white photography.

Thanks to the research on photographic toning in 1981 he was chosen by Time Life as one of the six most important up-and-coming photographers of the year; his portfolio was published in the yearbook Photography Year.

He worked for Condé Nast from 1981 to 2007. He combines fashion photography with research that in 1981 lead him to realize a series of photographs during a trip to the United States in the company of Franco Fontana. These works are shown at the Galleria Civica in Modena in 1984. The same year he too part in a travelling exhibition on Italian photography atone of the more important galleries in China.

In 1984 moved to Japan, where he worked for Mamiya and begins to design clothing.

Between 1984 and 1993 he traveled from Tokyo to Bali and then to New Zealand.

In 1993, after returning to Italy, he moved to Milan, but maintained a refuge in an old house in Torrechiara, in the province of Parma, at the foot of a castle.

In 2008 he started "Milano Notte", new work in which the Lombard city is photographed in its nocturnal solitude. He will conduct the same work in the city of Tokyo between January 2010 and December 2011. One of his most recent projects, begun in 2010 and still in progress, is "Mouche à lire": carefully selected pages of books on which to place a fly, immortalizing the dipteran on the written page, evidence of a long devotion and passion for reading.

Another of his most recent projects is "Magnetica": the research consists in putting on a magnet rotating at a steady speed, paper prisms or small objects made of glass or plastic that, thanks to the long exposure time of the camera; those make the illusion of three-dimensional shapes.

The last published project is "Tensione superficiale": it focuses on the return of the chemical phenomenon that is highlighted in images where the water falls form spherical geometries, that the human eye can hardly grasp.

== Main series ==
=== Margini, viaggio senza ritorno (1978–1985) ===
It is the author's first project. Mainly shot around Colorno, it is made of a group of images where the author shoots the landscape from the inside of a car, so that the automobile is visible. In another group of images the car is abandoned at the side of the road and the framing is focused on both the automobile and the surroundings. In the last group of images abandoned farmhouses, level crossings and filling stations are found. The photographs were toned by the author himself, with his own chemical recipes.

=== Cucina della mamma sorpresa nella notte (1980–1983) ===
The author shot in his own house. Most of the images focus on common objects like the phone, plates, a sponge or a cup. The photographs were toned by the author himself.

=== Troppo cazzo (1980) ===
The project consists in reinterpreting the Parma lowland adding a plastic phallus to the scenario, an alienating, ironic and intentionally provocative presence.

=== Passeggiata a Pisa (1981) ===
The project originates from the request of Giacinto Gnudi, the then president of the Tourism Agency of the province of Pisa, to produce a photographic documentation of the city. The historical inner city is almost always represented without the human presence.

=== USA (1982) ===
Photographs were taken during a journey in the USA together with the photographer Franco Fontana. The projects shares many points in common with "Margini, Viaggio senza ritorno", one being the investigation on the relationship between the automobile and the landscape.

=== Tokyo perduta (1985–1987) ===
The project consists in blurred pictures of the city of Tokyo. The objective of the author was to return the emotional stiffness of the city.

=== Humus (2004–2013) ===
The series focuses on documenting the hills nearby Parma and in particular the woods and the trees in that area.

=== Erbe (2008) ===
The point of view is no longer that of the human being: the camera is placed on the ground to simulate the perspective of a mouse or an insect.

=== Milano Notte (2008–2015), Nippon Night (2011), Parma dorme (2013–2014) ===
The three projects include shots taken at night. The main feature is again the absence of human beings and the relationship between the automobiles and the city architectures.

=== Mouche à lire (2009–2015) ===
Photographs immortalize dipterans leaned on pages of books written by the authors that characterized the author's readings, such as Kerouac, Kafka e Flaiano

=== Magnetica (2014–2015) ===
One of Pezzani's most recent projects is "Magnetica": the research consists in putting on a magnet rotating at a steady speed, paper prisms or small objects made of glass or plastic which give the illusion of three-dimensional shapes thanks to the long exposure time of the camera.

=== Tensione superficiale (2016) ===
The project focuses, as the title suggests, on the return of the chemical phenomenon that is highlighted in images where the water falls form spherical geometries, that the human eye can hardly grasp.

=== Blues Smoke (2017–2018) ===
With this project the author continues his research on the capability of photography to return the "not visible": clouds made of smoke that seem to lay on a completely black background, a uniformity able to highlight lines and volumes of almost transparent contortions, of a delicate veil that change their shapes continuously.

=== Girovaghi (2019) ===
Using the same technical gimmick as in the "Magnetica" project, some portraits taken of friends and artists seem to move swirling in space, rendering multiple personalities.

=== Covidi (2020) ===
During the long period of isolation caused by COVID-19, the author transforms his own home into a photographic set, relating everyday objects in an ironic and often grotesque dialogue. Domestic stories, expressions of surreal intimacy and improbable balances.

=== La collezione involontaria (2021) ===
A project commissioned by The Humanitarian Society of Milan whose aim was to bear witness to the Milanese institution's collection, recontextualising the works within the host architecture.

=== Mondo adulto (2022) ===
Photographs that, through a subtly ironic narrative, show the female body in the eroticism of everyday gestures.

=== Res Parvae (2025) ===
Surreal portraits of small households objects that come to life, irreverent and ironic in an almost otherworldly dimension.

== Main publications ==
- Arturo Carlo Quintavalle (1979). Enciclopedia pratica per fotografare (in Italian). Vol. A–C. Milan: Fratelli Fabbri Editori.
- Arturo Carlo Quintavalle (1980). Gianni Pezzani (in Italian). Milan: il Diaframma Ediphoto.
- "il diaframma". il diaframma (in Italian) (248). Milan: il Diaframma Ediphoto. 1980.
- "Photography Year 1981". Photography Year. Alexandria, Virginia (USA): Time-Life Books. 1981. ISSN 0090-4406.
- Photography Year 1981–82. London: Time-Life Books. 1981. ISBN 0705403890.
- Linee della ricerca artistica in Italia 1960-1980 (in Italian). Rome: De Luca Publisher. 1981.
- Giuseppe Bonini, ed. (1982). Luoghi dell'Immaginario, momenti della fotografia italiana contemporanea (in Italian).
- Selection 1983. Tokyo, Ginza: Kodak Nagase Photo Salon. 1983.
- "Camera Mainichi". Camera Mainichi (in Japanese) (11). 1983.
- "Progresso Fotografico". Progresso Fotografico (in Italian) (febbraio). Milan: Editrice Progresso. 1984. ISSN 0033-0868.
- T-Show. Storia e nuovi stili della T-Shirt (in Italian). Milan: Electa. 1984. ISBN 8843510282.
- Giuseppe Bonini, ed. (1984). Simulacri del paesaggio: mostra di: Augusto De Luca, Gianni Pezzani, Mimmo Jodice, Maurizio Mantovi (in Italian). Modena: Panini.
- Ken Damy (1984). Gianni Pezzani (in Italian). Milan: Edizioni Progresso Fotografico.
- "British Journal of Photography (annuario)". The British Journal of Photography. 1985. ISSN 0007-1196.
- Arturo Carlo Quintavalle, ed. (1985). Tendenze artistiche in Italia 1970–1985 (in Italian). Rome.
- Fotografi italiani. Diario immaginario di Lanfranco Colombo (in Italian). Bergamo: Bolis Edizioni. 1993. ISBN 8878270482.
- Arturo Carlo Quintavalle (1994). Messa a fuoco. Studi sulla fotografia (in Italian). Milan: Feltrinelli. ISBN 880710010X.
- VITA DA BAMBINO nelle immagini di 108 fotografi italiani (in Italian). con un racconto di Bianca Pitzorno. Udine: Arti Grafiche Friulane. 1995. ISBN 88-86550-13-8.
- Giannino Malossi, ed. (1998). The Style Engine. New York: The Monacelli Press. ISBN 1885254954.
- Giannino Malossi, ed. (1998). Il Motore della Moda (in Italian). New York: The Monacelli Press. ISBN 8879400452.
- Arturo Carlo Quintavalle, ed. (2000). Gianni Pezzani, Quaderno n. 77 (in Italian). Parma: Centro Studio e Archivio della Comunicazione, Università di Parma.
- Roberto Mutti, ed. (2002). "Immagine Fotografica", n. 328, Portfolio (in Italian).
- Guido Vergani, ed. (2004). Dizionario della moda (in Italian). Milan: Baldini Castoldi Dalai. ISBN 8880898663.
- TRASH. Impressioni sull'ambiente (in Italian). 2004.
- Il Diaframma di Lanfranco Colombo. I Maestri della Fotografia (in Italian). Peggy Guggenheim Collection. 2005.
- Philippe Daverio; Jean Blanchaert, eds. (2007). 13 x 17. Mille artisti per un'indagine eccentrica sull'arte in Italia (in Italian). Milan: Rizzoli. ISBN 978-8817018951.
- Carlo Mambriani, ed. (2009). Il Bosco di Torrile: storia e futuro di una foresta perduta (in Italian). Reggio Emilia: Diabasis. ISBN 978-88-8103-640-0.
- Tempo Zero 2010, calendario del Comune di Milano (in Italian). Nava Design. 2010.
- Arturo Carlo Quintavalle; Gloria Bianchino, eds. (2010). Nove100 (in Italian). Milano: Skira. ISBN 978-8857205618.
- Arturo Carlo Quintavalle; Gloria Bianchino, eds. (2012). I Mille scatti per una storia d'Italia (in Italian). Milan: Skira. ISBN 978-8857214269.
- Arturo Carlo Quintavalle (2013). Gianni Pezzani. Ombre (in English and Italian). Milan: Skira. ISBN 978-8857221762.
- Gianni Pezzani; Andrea Tinterri (2014). Parma dorme (in Italian). Milan: Skira. ISBN 978-8857225630.
- Arturo Carlo Quintavalle, ed. (2014). Fuoco nero. Materia e struttura attorno e dopo Burri (in Italian). Milan: Skira. ISBN 978-8857222042.
- Noema Gallery, ed. (2015). Gianni Pezzani. Magnetica (in English and Italian). with texts by Denis Curti and Andrea Tinterri. Pesaro: Greta Edizioni. ISBN 978-88-99367-01-5.,
- "L'Aperitivo Illustrato". L'Aperitivo Illustrato (in English and Italian) (69). Pesaro: Greta Edizioni. 2015. ISSN 2037-0490.
- "#AI Magazine - The Art Review". L'Aperitivo Illustrato (in Italian) (75). 2017. ISSN 2037-0490.
- Gianni Pezzani, ed. (2023). Inclassificabile (in Italian). Parma: Nuova Editrice Berti. ISBN 9788873648123.
- Giovanna Calvenzi, ed. (2026). La Vittoria di Brescia. 40 fotografi e un’eterna bellezza (in Italian). Milan: Skira.

== Main exhibitions ==
=== Group ===
- 1979: Pisa, "1° Incontro nazionale con i fotografi per la Regata delle Antiche Repubbliche Marinare"
- 1981: Rome, Palazzo delle Esposizioni, "Linee della ricerca artistica in Italia 1960–1980"
- 1982: Modena, Galleria Civica, "Simulacri del paesaggio"
- 1982: Suzzara, Galleria d'Arte Contemporanea, "Luoghi dell’Immaginario, momenti della fotografia italiana contemporanea"
- 1983: Beijing, travelling exhibition
- 1983: Malmö, Malmö Art Museum
- 1984: Paris, Centre Pompidou, "IMAGES ET IMAGINAIRE D’ARCHITECTURE"
- 1984: Milan, galleria Studio Marconi, "T-Show"
- 1985: Rome, Palazzo delle Esposizioni
- 1985: Belgrade, Befu '85, 7th World Biennal of Photography
- 1993: Bergamo, Galleria d'Arte Moderna e Contemporanea, "Fotografi italiani. Diario immaginario di Lanfranco Colombo"
- 1998: Florence, Stazione Leopolda, "Il motore della moda" (outfitting by Achille Castiglioni, Gianfranco Cavaglià, Italo Lupi)
- 2003: Turin, Palazzo Barolo, "Viaggio in Giappone" (in the exhibition "Cosa c’è dietro al Kimono")
- 2004: Genova, "TRASH. Impressioni sull'ambiente"
- 2005: Venice, Peggy Guggenheim Collection, "Il Diaframma di Lanfranco Colombo. I Maestri della Fotografia"
- 2005: Venice, Chiesa di San Gallo, "13 x 17. Mille artisti per un'indagine eccentrica sull'arte in Italia"
- 2010: Parma, Palazzo del Governatore, "Nove100" (photography section)
- 2011: Reggio Emilia, Italian Pavilion (Emilia Romagna section), 54th Venice Art Biennale
- 2012: Parma, Palazzo del Governatore, "Mille scatti per una storia d'Italia"
- 2013: Milan, Fondazione Mudima, "Prove di fotografia"
- 2014: Parma, Palazzo della Pilotta (Salone delle Scuderie), "Fuoco nero: materia e struttura attorno e dopo Burri"
- 2021: Brescia, Macof, Brescia Photo Festival 2021 - "Patrimoni"
- 2021: Milano Photo Festival "Forms & Shapes"
- 2026: Brescia, Museo di Santa Giulia, "La Vittoria di Brescia. 40 fotografi e un’eterna bellezza"

=== Solo ===
- 1979: Milan, il Diaframma/Canon
- 1980: Grenoble, Galerie Madeleine
- 1983: Tokyo, Kodak Nagase Photo Salon Ginza
- 1983: Turin, Libreria Agorà, "Edipo ed Elettra"
- 1984: Brussels, Paul Pia Gallery
- 2000: Fondazione Magnani-Rocca, "Retrospettiva"
- 2007: Milan, Hublab Gallery, "Humus"
- 2011: Brescia, WavePhotogallery, Antologica "1970 – 2011"
- 2014: Parma, Portici del Grano, "Parma dorme"
- 2015: Milan, showroom Boffi, "Magnetica"
- 2015: Brescia, Planet Vigasio, "Brescia Dorme"
- 2017: Milan, Società Umanitaria, "Milano Notte"
- 2018: Milano, Après-coup, "Viraggi"
- 2021: Brescia, Biblioteca Comunale di Vobarno, "Humus"
- 2024: Brescia, Spazio Fondazione Negri, "Inclassificabile"
