= Gasparo Antonio Turbini =

Italian architect and Jesuit priest

Gasparo Antonio Turbini (December 16, 1728 - 1802) was an Italian architect and Jesuit priest, mainly active in a Neoclassical-style in the Province of Brescia, Italy.

== Biography ==
Gasparo was born to a Marcantonio Turbini (died 1756) from Lugano in Switzerland. Among his works were the Palaces in Brescia of Conti Soardi, of Luzzaghi, and of Conte Cesare Provaglio. Marcantonio designed the entry staircase of the Casa Fenaroli and Villa or Palazzo Conti Lechi a Montirone. He designed the parish church of Manerbio.

Gasparo joined the Jesuit order in 1746, and received his education in mathematics and physics through the order, with particular tutelage under Francesco Sanvitale. Gasparo himself taught at the Jesuit college in Brescia. He was admitted to the Accademia Clementina of Bologna in October 1762, the Accademia Reale di Parma in 1772, and the Accademia Agraria of Brescia in 1776. He was a polymath and presented dissertations on varied subjects at the Libreria Pubblica Quiriniana of Brescia, including talks on Roman Baths, and on ancient and modern theater construction, and on the construction of ovens to dry grains. He published a number of volumes, mainly translations and commentaries on architecture.

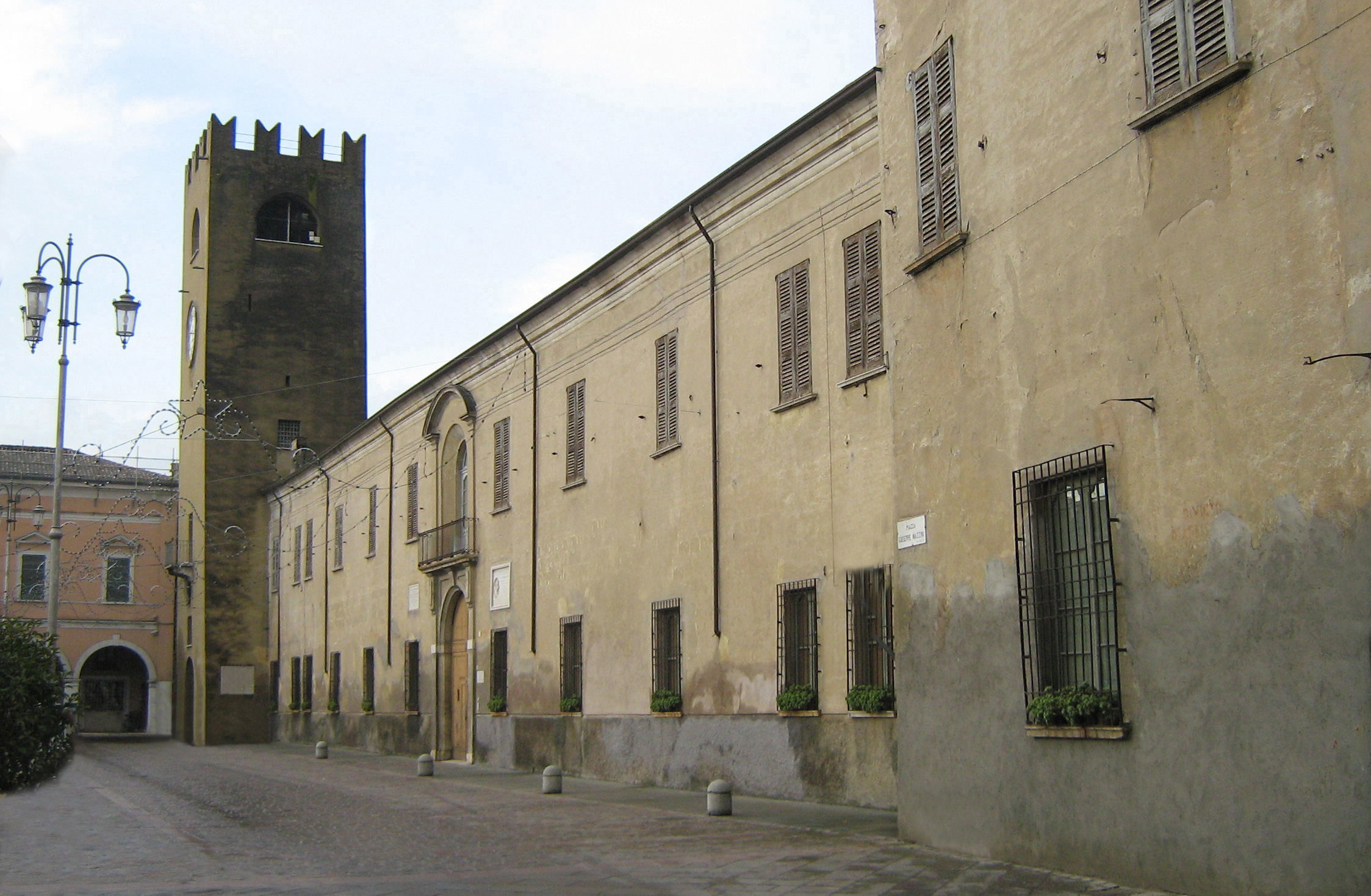
Palazzo Gonzaga-Acerbi, Castel Goffredo

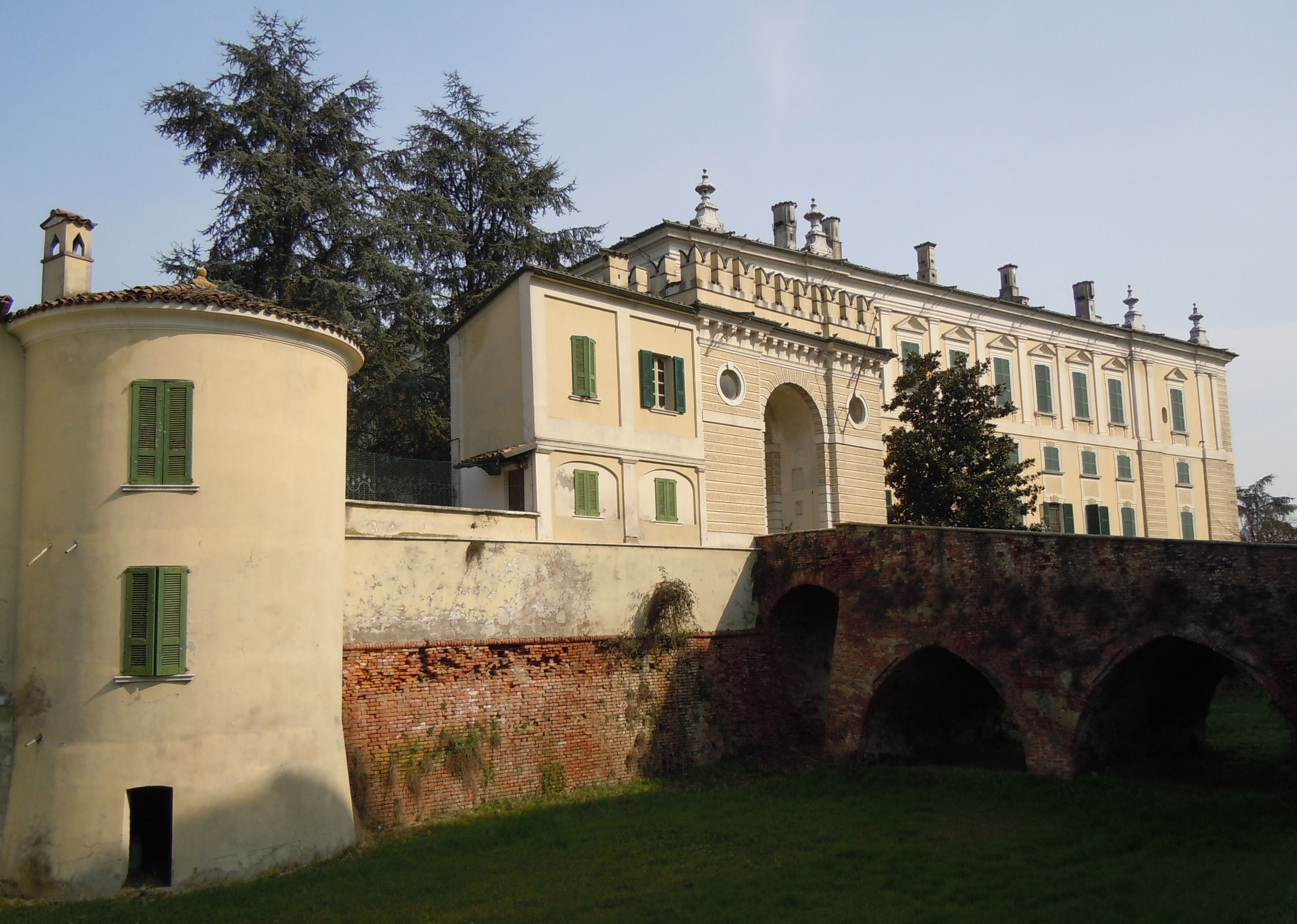
Palazzo Gambara, Pralboino

He was very prolific as an architect, and his works include:

- Palazzo Ugoni, Brescia
- Houses for Onofri a' Miracoli, G. Torriceni alla Grazie, Covi at Santa Giulia in Brescia
- Palazo B Durini a Santa Croce
- Church and home for the Knights of Malta
- Parish church of Preseglie (1750)
- Parish church of Montirone (1762-1810)
- Parish church di San Lorenzo in Nuvolera (1766-1786)
- Sanctuary of the Madonna della Neve, Adro (completed 1776)
- Facade and Staircase of Teatro Grande, Brescia (1780)
- Parish church of Palosco, Province of Bergamo
- Church of San Leonardo, Bergamo
- Vault of the Church of Gussago (1753)
- Sanctuary of the Virgin del Patrocinio at Valle Tavareda, (1750) outside Brescia
- Palazzo Vertua Massetti in Quinzano d'Oglio (1780)
- Portico of Palazzo Ciocca in Quinzano d'Oglio
- Palazzo Gambara in Pralboino (1782)
- Parish church Natività di Maria Vergine of Berlingo (1788)
- Parish church of Cologne (1791-1827)
- Church of Santa Maria Assunta, Pisogne (1799) with design by Antonio Marchetti
- Main altar, Church of Bagolino
- Main Salon of Palazzo Pilati, Montichiari
- Parish church of Gussago
- Church of Santa Maria Assunta, San Paolo
- Altar of the Parish Church of San Pietro e Paolo, Toscolano-Maderno
- Villa Fenaroli, Seniga
- Palazzo Fenaroli, Brescia
- Palazzo Gonzaga-Acerbi, Castel Goffredo with Carlo Bollani, Mantua
- Palazzo Soardi at Gavazza near Orcinuovi
- Refurbishment of Palazzo Gonzaga-Acerbi in Castel Goffredo, Mantua.
