= Battle of Colorno =

1734 battle

- Part of the War of the Polish Succession
Date	25 May - 5 June 1734
Location	Colorno, Duchy of Parma Emilia-Romagna, Italy) 44°56′N 10°23′E
Result	Franco-Sardinian victory

Belligerents
France; Sardinia	Holy Roman Empire

Commanders and leaders
(Kingdom of Sardinia) Charles Emmanuel III of Sardinia (Kingdom of France) François-Marie, 1st duc de Broglie (Kingdom of France) François de Franquetot de Coigny (Kingdom of France) Noël Jourda de Vaux	(Holy Roman Empire) Florimund Mercy (Holy Roman Empire) Frederick of Württemberg (Holy Roman Empire) Léopold-Marc de Ligniville †

Strength
65,000 men	60,000 men

Casualties and losses
1,600 killed and wounded	1,300 killed and wounded

The Battle of Colorno consisted of two battles, fought between 25 May and 5 June 1734, between Franco-Sardinian and Austrian (Habsburg) troops as part of the War of Polish Succession.

Begun on 25 May 1734, the Imperial Austro-German armies conquered and occupied Colorno and its palace during the decisive attack of 1 June.
During the second battle of 4-5 June the Franco-Piedmontese drove them out of Colorno again, forcing them to withdraw.

These events were part of the Polish War of Succession and were the prelude of the larger Battle of San Pietro, which took place in the Valera Campaign, outside the walls of Parma, on 29 June 1734.
