= Antonio Bresciani (artist) =

Italian painter and engraver (1720–1817)

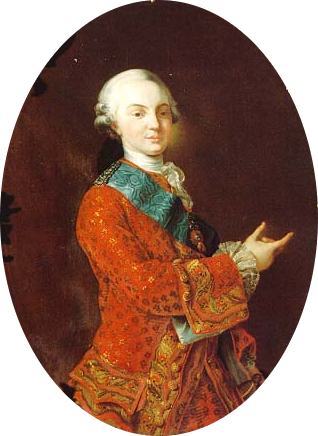

Antonio Bresciani (Piacenza, 1720 - 31 October 1817) was an Italian painter and engraver.

== Biography ==
He was born to poor parents trained under Carlo Bianchi in Piacenza. He moved in 1740 to work in Bologna with Donato Creti. In 1748, he moved back to Piacenza and engraved some of the works of Ludovico Carracci. He moved to Parma, where he painted a canvas of San Macario for the church of Sant'Eulalia (parish church of Sant'Ilario d'Enza). He also painted a Convito d'Epulone (depicting an event in the Parable of the Rich Man and Lazarus) for the church of San Lazzaro Alberoni, attached to Collegio Alberoni in Piacenza. He painted a Sant'Alberto resuscitates a youth for the fifth chapel at right of Carmine in Parma; a St Martino and St James Apostle for the church of Santa Maria Bianca; and a Multiplication of the Loaves for the church of Sant'Andrea.

He was named the professor of painting at the Academy of Fine Arts of Parma, and in 1777 was made academic of honor for the Clementine Academy in Bologna.
