= Convitto Nazionale Maria Luigia =

School in Parma, Emilia-Romagna, Italy

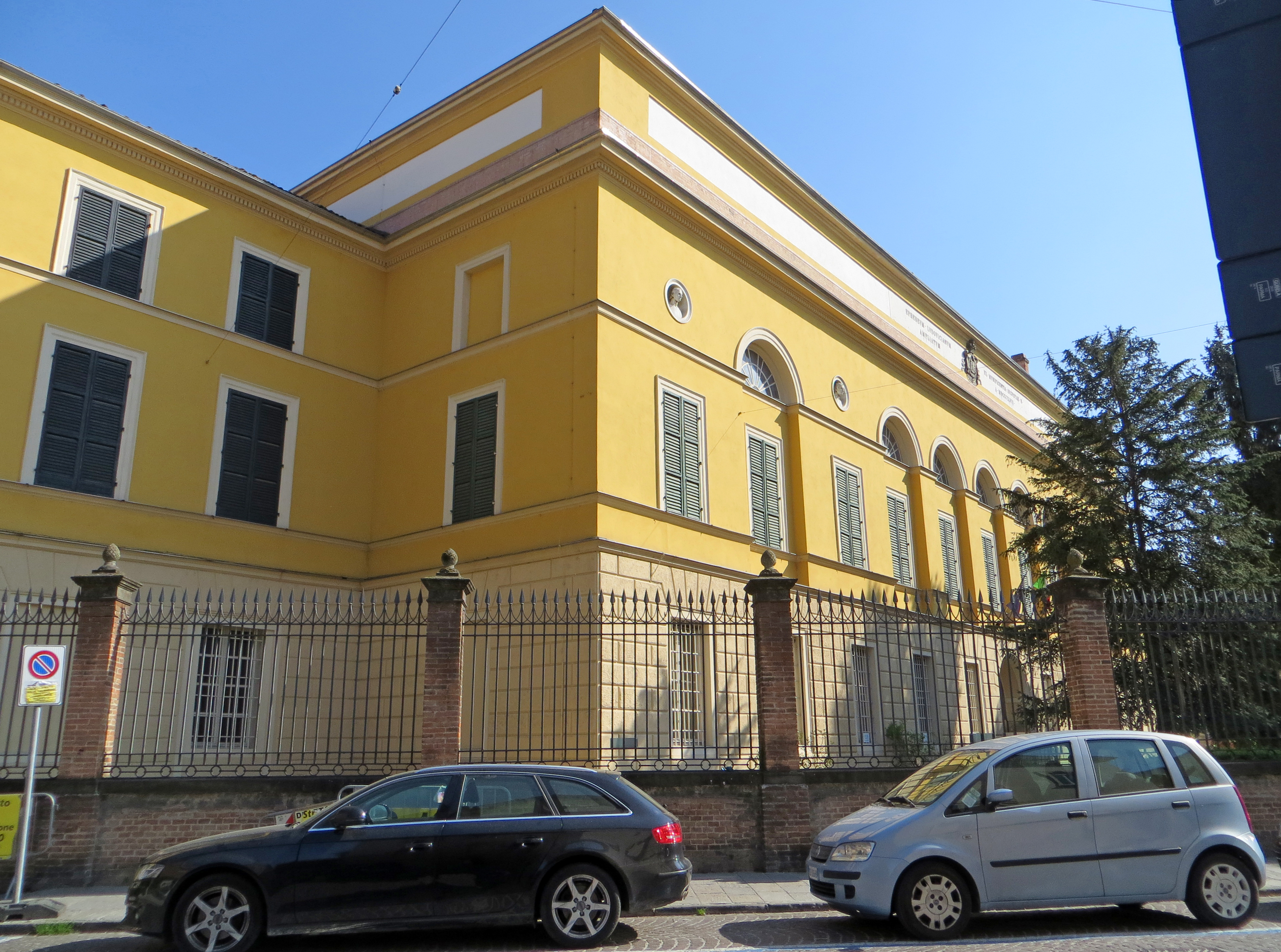
Present facade

The Convitto Nazionale Maria Luigia, once known as the Collegio Ducale Maria Luigia, is a state school located on Borgo Lalatta 14 within the grounds of the Palazzo Imperiale dell'Arena (formerly owned by the Lalatta family) in Parma, region of Emilia-Romagna, Italy.

== History ==
The buildings putatively stand atop a site which once housed a large Ancient Roman arena. In 1158, the emperor Barbarossa built a palace at the site, completed by 1162. Over the next two centuries it had various owners, and required various reconstructions. In 1547, what had become a dilapidated building was inherited by the aristocratic Larlatta family, who refurbished some of the frescoed rooms, including the Sala dei Giganti, which was decorated by Lattanzio Gambara, and the Biblioteca Storica, decorated by Michelangelo Anselmi. It was briefly owned by the ruling Farnese family from 1624 to 1652, but repossessed by the Lalatta until 1755, when it was first endowed to become a school by the canon Antonio Lalatta.

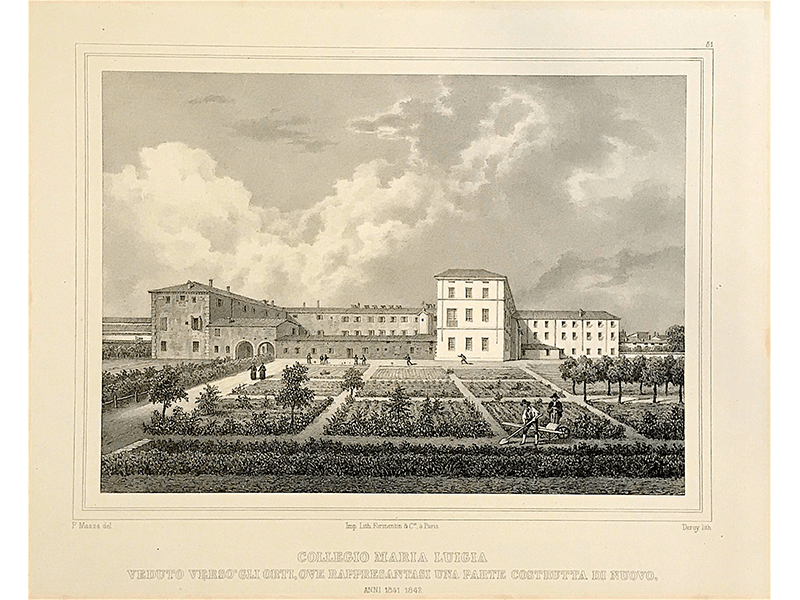
Pietro Mazza, Collegio Maria Luigia, view from the gardens, 1841-1842

The Collegio Ducale Maria Luigia was brought about by the consolidation of the former Collegio di Santa Caterina, also known as the Collegio dei Nobili and the separate College endowed by the Larlatta family. The Collegio dei Nobili, which mainly educated aristocrats, had been started in 1601 by Duke Ranuccio I Farnese. While the Lalatta school enrolled children from non-noble families. The former Lalatta palace also housed this school, and was enlarged between 1836 and 1847 by the Ducal architect, Nicola Bettoli. The project occurred under the rule of Maria Luigia, Duchess of Parma, who inaugurated the school in 1831. In 1821, Maria Luisa commissioned Bettoli to design the theater, now auditorium of the school.

The education at the school was initially carried out by the Benedictine monks from the Abbey of San Giovanni Evangelista, who had taught at the Collegio dei Nobili. In 1834, they were replaced by priests of the Barnabite order, who remained affiliated with the school until 1872, when it was made a secular school. The school continues to educate children from primary to secondary school.

== Notable alumni ==
- Gio Scotti, influencer and model

== Bibliography ==
- Stamperia Carmignani, ed. (1837). Indice analitico ed alfabetico della raccolta generale delle leggi per gli stati di Parma Piacenza e Guastalla degli anni 1814 al 1835 (in Italian). Vol. primo. Parma.
- Cristina Cecchinelli (2013). "Le "vacanze grandi" a Fontevivo tra i Farnese e i Borbone". In MUP editore (ed.). Il Collegio dei Nobili di Parma. La formazione delle classe dirigente (secoli XVII-XIX). Parma. pp. 83–113.
- Alessandro De Luca (2016). Associazione culturale Diacronie (ed.). "Recensione: curated by Alba Mora, Il Collegio dei Nobili di Parma. La formazione della classe dirigente (secoli XVII-XIX), Parma, MUP, 2013, 394 pp". Diacronie. Studi di Storia Contemporanea. 1 (25).
- Giovanni Sommo (2014). Del Cardo (ed.). "Documenti per una lettura storica e territoriale delle collezioni archeologiche locali del Museo C. Leone". Corrispondenze Archeologiche Vercellesi.
