= Parma Courthouse =

Building in Parma, Italy

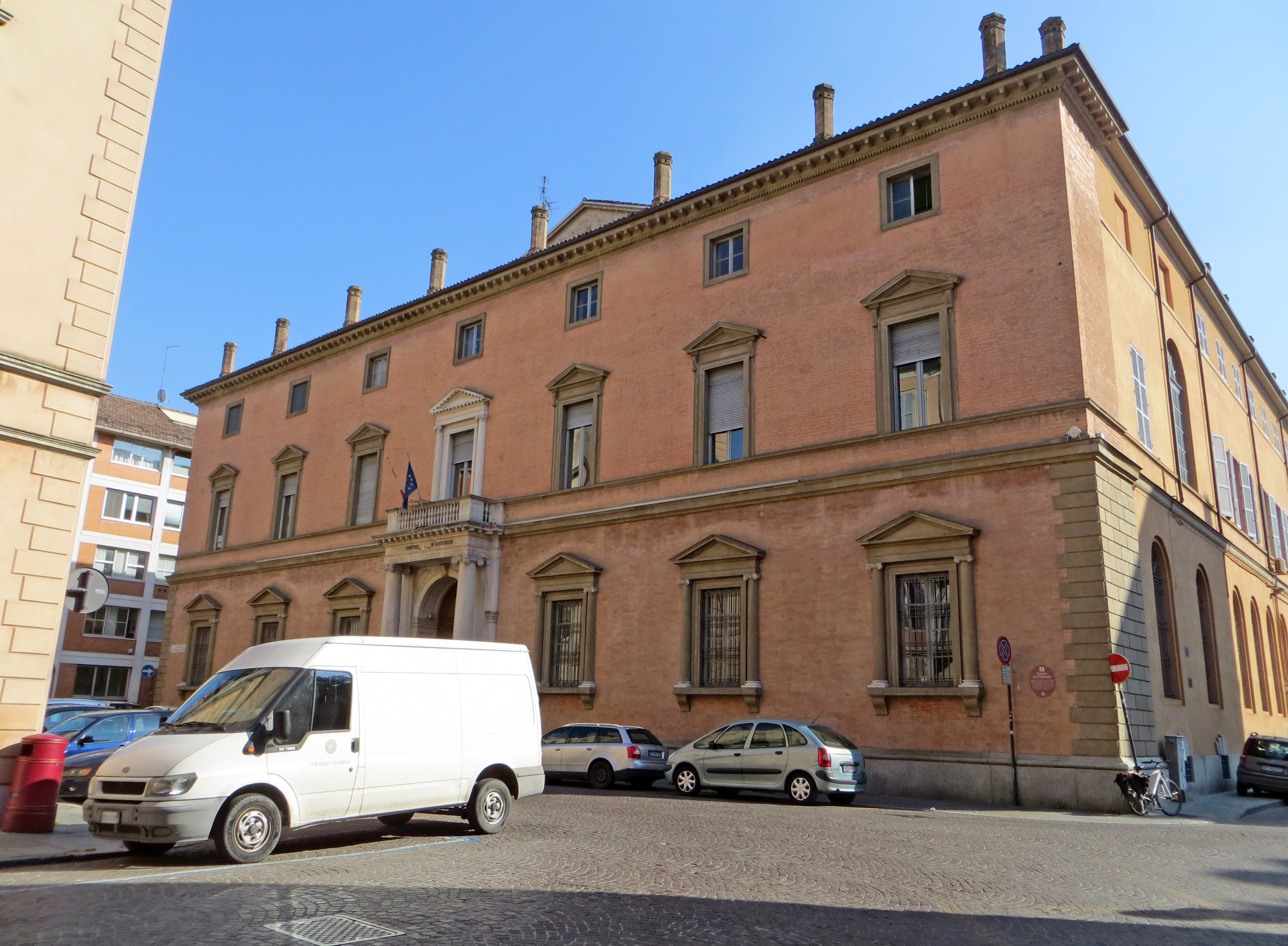
- Interactive map of the Parma Courthouse area

General information
- Location: Parma, Emilia-Romagna, Italy
- Coordinates: 44°47′58.4″N 10°19′34.9″E
- Construction started: 1844

Design and construction
- Architects: Nicola Bettoli, Luigi Bettoli

The Parma Courthouse (Palazzo di Giustizia, or Palazzo del Tribunale) is a building located on Piazza Corte d'Appello in Parma, Italy.

== History ==
In 1601, Duke Ranuccio I Farnese founded the Collegio dei Nobili, also known as the Collegio di Santa Caterina, an educational institution for noble boys aged 10 to 20. Managed by the Jesuits, the college thrived until the mid-18th century, after which it declined and was suppressed during the Napoleonic period. It was later reopened, but in 1831, Duchess Marie Louise ordered its definitive closure, merging the complex with the Lalatta College into the new Ducal College Marie Louise.

The large college complex, stripped of furnishings and artworks, was demolished in 1844 by order of the duchess. Simultaneously, plans for a new building were underway, designed by architect Nicola Bettoli and inspired by Rome's Palazzo Farnese. This building was intended to host the University of Parma and became the city's courthouse in 1924.

== Description ==
The palace has a rectangular plan with two symmetrical side courtyards and a central entrance block. The main façade, built in brick, features decorative stone elements such as window frames, Ionic columns, and a central portal with marble columns and a balcony. The side facades differ: that facing Vicolo San Tiburzio is in brick with simple windows, while the opposite façade is plastered and less ornate. At the rear, a modern building houses judicial offices.

Inside, the vaulted hall opens onto two main staircases, and the rooms are decorated with columns and paintings, including the richly adorned tempera courtroom.
