= Sant'Alessandro, Parma =

Church building in Parma, Italy

Coordinates: 44°48′09.59″N 10°19′38.14″E

Church of St Alexander; Chiesa di Sant'Alessandro (Italian)
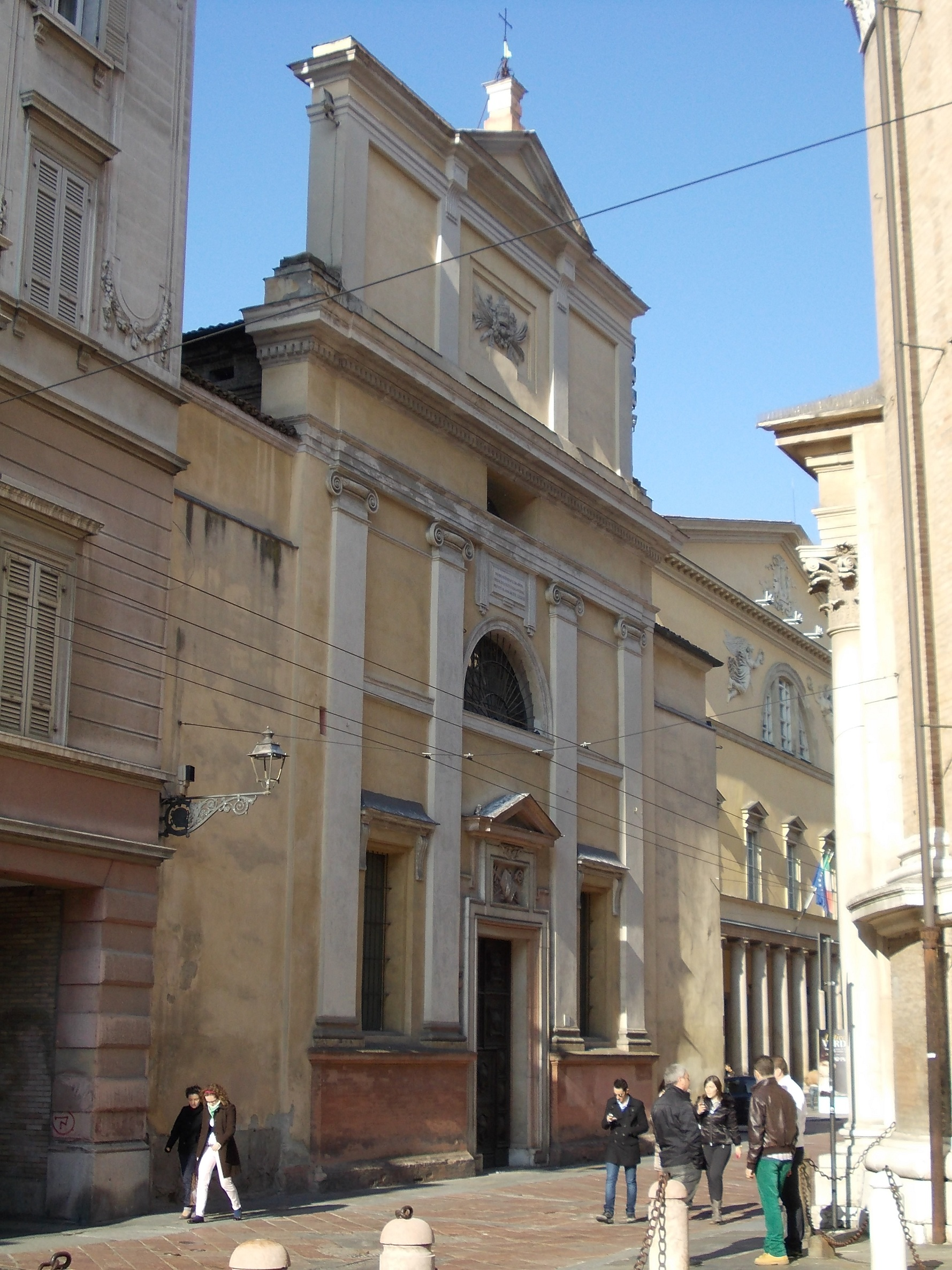
- Sant'Alessandro

Religion
- Affiliation: Catholic
- Year consecrated: 836

Location
- Location: Parma, Italy
- Interactive map of: Church of St Alexander; Chiesa di Sant'Alessandro (Italian)

Architecture
- Architects: Bernardino Zaccagni (exterior 1527); Giovanni Battista Magnani (interior, 1622-24)
- Style: Baroque
- Groundbreaking: 1527
- Completed: 1624

Sant'Alessandro is a Baroque-style, Roman Catholic church located on in via Garibaldi #14 in central Parma, Italy. The facade of the church faces the church of the Steccata.

== History ==
The church of Sant'Alessandro and the adjacent Benedictine monastery was founded first in the year 835, putatively patronized by Cunegonda, widow of Bernard of Italy, King of the Lombards. In 837, Pope Gregory IV donated the remains of Pope Alexander I (Saint Alexander) to this church. The monastery was also associated with Saint Berthold of Parma.

The church was rebuilt in 1527 under the direction of the architect Bernardino Zaccagni, and in 1622-1624 under designs by Giovanni Battista Magnani. The monastic community was dissolved by Napoleon in 1810, and the abbey was mostly later supplanted by the Royal Theater of Parma.

== Interior Decoration ==
The ceiling of the nave was frescoed by Angelo Michele Colonna, while Alessandro Tiarini completed the illusionist cupola frescoes of the Redeemer, Madonna and angels carrying the instruments of the passion, and by four pendants with Saints Bonaventure, Gertrude, Berthold, and Alexander. Tiarini also painted an altarpiece of St Berthold for the church. In the third chapel on the left, is a painting of the Madonna and child with St. Maurus and Benedict, attributed to Sebastiano Ricci. The main altarpiece was painted by Girolamo Bedoli, and depicts the Madonna and child granting St Giustina the palm of martyrdom, while Saint Benedict grants St Alexander a incense bearer. The organ, non-functioning, dates from 1856, and was constructed by Antonio Sangalli.
