= Gio Scotti =

Italian model and influencer (born 2006)

- Scotti in 2026
- Born: Giovanna Scotti; December 2, 2006 (age 19); Parma, Emilia-Romagna, Italy

Instagram information
- Page: giògiò
- Years active: 2019–present
- Genres: Lip-sync, lifestyle, traveling, fashion
- Followers: 653 thousand

TikTok information
- Page: jerry 🍓
- Years active: 2020–present
- Genres: Lip-sync, lifestyle, traveling, fashion
- Followers: 2.1 million
- Last updated: October 25, 2026
- Modeling information
- Agency: Sartoria Management

Giovanna Scotti (born December 2, 2006) is an Italian influencer and model. Heralding from Emilia-Romagna, she began posting videos on TikTok in 2020 during the COVID-19 lockdowns and had amassed a large following by 2022. She was then courted by modeling and advertising groups and has been featured for fashion brands such as Armani, Max Mara, and Dior. Additionally, Scotti has garnered coverage in both English and Italian-language media for her popularity amongst various far-right and manosphere groups online.

== Biography ==
Giovanna Scotti was born on December 2, 2006 in Parma, Italy, to an Italian father and a Russian mother. She attended the Convitto Nazionale Maria Luigia, a high school within the city. She began posting videos on TikTok in 2020, during the COVID-19 pandemic. By April 2022, she had amassed 900 thousand followers on the platform, and began to be courted by various advertising and modelling agencies at the time.

At the time, Scotti stated that she did not view being an influencer as a job, and opted to focus on her studies at first. Scotti's content typically features fashion, everyday habits, lifestyle posts, and her daily life. She has never posted any politically related content. By January 2026, Scotti had accumulated 700 thousand followers on Instagram and two million on TikTok.

Scotti has done work for Armani, Max Mara, and Dior. She has been covered in Vogue and Vanity Fair. She has attended the Venice International Film Festival on multiple occasions, and has been featured at Milan Fashion Week. She has also done advertising gigs, such as for the Teatro Regio in Parma.

In 2022, a video went particularly viral where fellow Italian influencer Gabriele Greco pretended to kiss Scotti before pulling away. Despite this, no romantic links between the two were confirmed. Scotti has stated that she plays tennis and is an animal lover.

== Appropriation by radical elements ==
Gio Scotti at the 83rd Venice International Film Festival in 2026

Scotti has become an icon amongst various extreme right and manosphere scenes online, attributed by some to her "Aryan" and "classy" appearance. She has been mentioned frequently in the looksmaxxing community. In October 2025, the United States Department of Homeland Security released a reel on Instagram that included a clip of her as part of an edit.

In 2022, a viral meme emerged, starting on Twitter, where Scotti was depicted as a prepubescent "Greek towel boy" who was taken on as a lover, referencing pederastic practices in ancient Greece and Rome. These posts were often accompanied by projections of homoerotic sexual fantasies, with her even being compared to the lover of Socrates. At the time, Scotti was 16. The meme was criticized by many as predatory, especially considering most ancient Roman boys in pederastic relationships were sex slaves, and Scotti herself eventually responded negatively in an Instagram story in 2023.

Scotti has also been used as a symbol by the far-right and white supremacists. In early 2026, uses of her likeness by them garnered extensive coverage in Italian media, who noted that she was being combined with far-right imagery, including fascist and even Nazi references. Such imagery, often made using generative AI, included ones where she was wearing an SS uniform or that of a Roman centurion, was superimposed on symbology of the Italian Social Republic, or placed in settings reminiscent of the Roman Empire. On platforms such as X, she was described as Benito Mussolini's granddaughter and an "Aryan beauty". The phenomenon was attributed to various neo-fascist groups, incels, and Groypers.
