= Marco d'Agrate =

Italian sculptor

- Born: c. 1504
- Died: c. 1574
- Known for: Sculpture
- Notable work: St Bartholomew Flayed

Marco d'Agrate (c. 1504 – c. 1574) was an Italian sculptor of the Renaissance period, active mainly in Lombardy, Italy.

He was born to a family of sculptors, and collaborated with his brother Gian Francesco in a monument to Sforzino Sforza found in Basilica of Santa Maria della Steccata in Parma. He also worked on the tomb of Giovanni del Conte in the Basilica of San Lorenzo in Milan, and for the façade of the Certosa of Pavia.

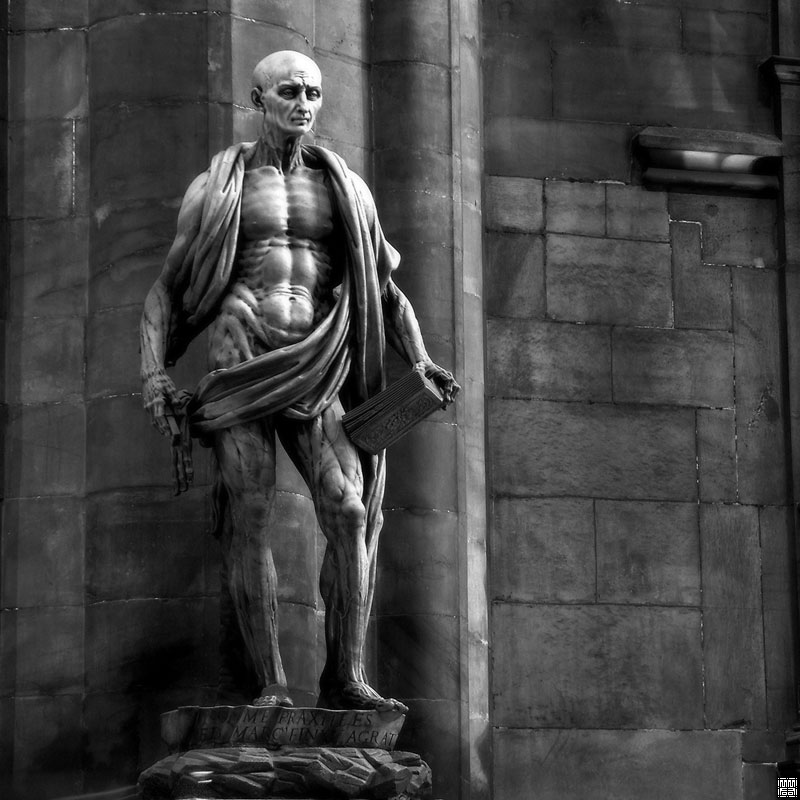
Statue of St Bartholomew Flayed (1562) by Marco d'Agrate, Milan Cathedral

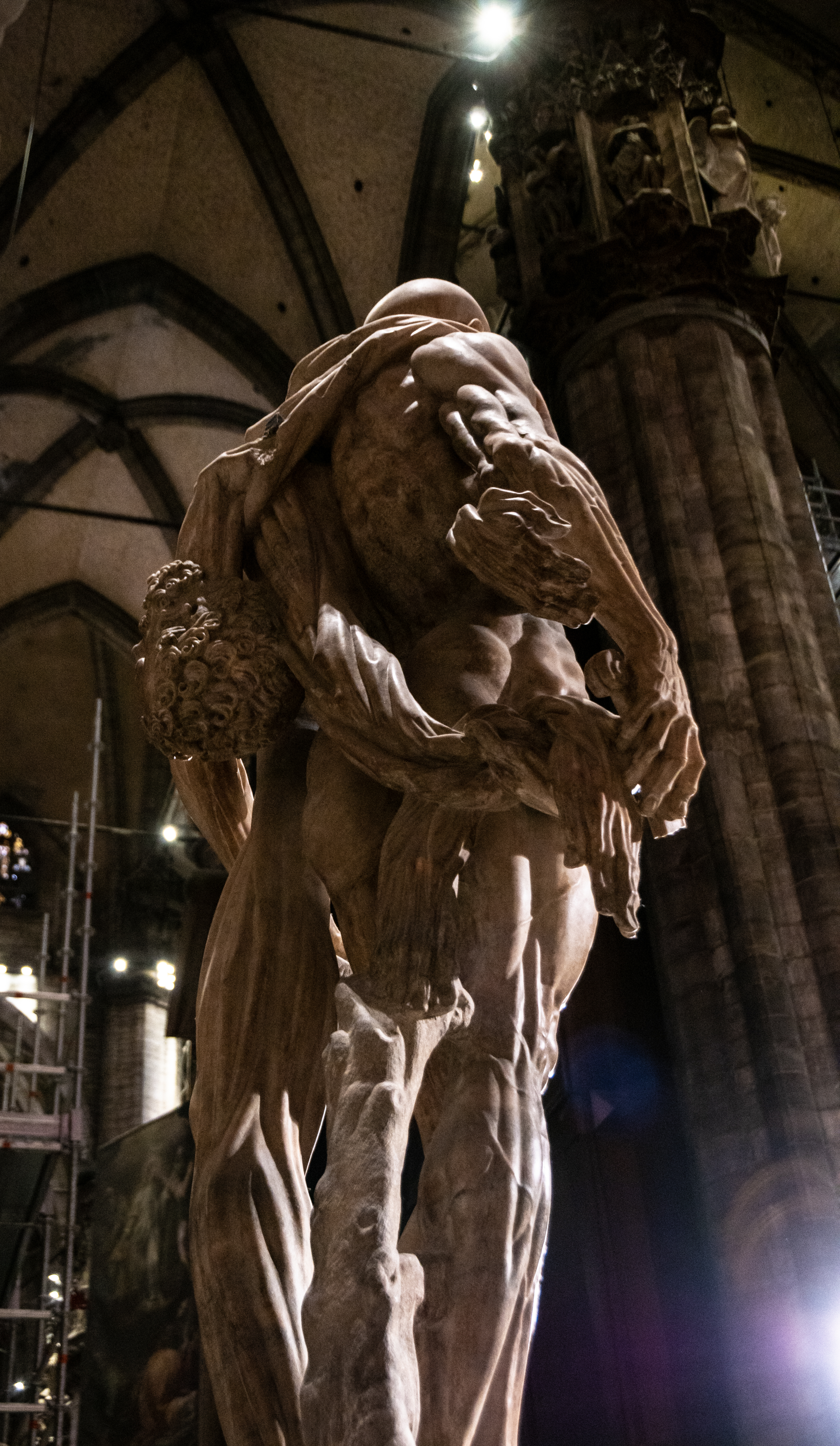
Statue of St Bartholomew Flayed (1562) viewed from behind, Milan Cathedral

His best known work is the statue of St Bartholomew Flayed (1562), depicting Bartholomew the Apostle, found in the transept of the Cathedral of Milan. He signed it with a line in Latin that states: Non me Praxiteles, sed Marc'finxit Agrat, "I was not made by Praxiteles but by Marco d'Agrate".
