= Giovanni Battista Magnani =

Italian architect (1571–1653)

Giovanni Battista Magnani (21 September 1571 – 1653) was an Italian architect working entirely in Parma in the first half of the 17th century. He was the most successful of a family of masons and architects that included his father Nicostrato and his son Carlo.

He was trained in the workshop of Giovan Battista Aleotti, with whom he collaborated at the hexagonal church of Santa Maria del Quartiere, and which he completed after Aleotti's death, altering the design (1604–1610). He completed Aleotti's indoor theatre for Ranuccio Farnese, the first theatre with changeable scenery. Among his early works on his own are the monument erected in the Duomo to his friend, the painter Agostino Carracci (died 1602), the altar to Saint Joseph in the Sanctuary of Santa Maria della Steccata (1608) and, in fulfilment of a vow, that for the Carmelites in Santa Maria Maddalena de' Pazzi (1611).

In 1622 he was nominated architect to the city, in the service of the Farnese dukes. In this capacity he was responsible for four temporary triumphal arches, one of which was engraved in Milan by Carlo Bianchi, was intended for the festive and solemn first entrata into Parma of Margherita de' Medici following her wedding in Florence to Duke Odoardo I Farnese, 11 October 1628. One of the remaining arches is the Arch of San Lazzaro, Parma.

Among his works are the fountain in the Benedictine monastery of San Paolo (1613–1624); the interior reconstruction and campanile of Sant'Alessandro (1622–1624); the arcaded municipal palazzo (1627–1629). He collaborated in the construction of the courtyard and grand staircase of the Palazzo della Pilotta. Among designs attributed to him are that for the church of Santa Maria delle Grazie (1617), in the Oltretorrente district of Parma. Design of the conservative façade of the church of San Giovanni Evangelista, still Mannerist in its handling, which has sometimes been attributed to him, was entrusted to Simone Moschino, and carried out by Giambattista Carra da Bissone, who also realized the sculptures.
