= Bernardino Zaccagni =

Italian architect (c.1455–1531)

Bernardino Zaccagni (c. 1455 – 1531) was an Italian architect, mainly active in a Renaissance style in Parma.

== Biography ==
He was born in Parma. Little is known of his training, except that his father, Francesco, was also a builder or architect.

He was active in the construction of the churches of San Benedetto (1498–1501) and Santa Maria del Carmine (1500–1502) in Parma. In San Benedetto he worked along with Pellegrino da Pontremoli. He helped design the small chapel of Pedrignano near Parma (1507–1509). He helped build the hospital of Rodolfo Tanzi (1506–1511).

In November and December 1521, Zaccagni, together with other Parma master builders and architects, took care of improving the city fortifications. In 1523, Zaccagni worked on the bell tower of San Francesco del Prato. He also designed the church's Oratorio della Concezione (Oratory of the Immaculate Conception).

Among his most important works are the design of the basilica of San Giovanni Evangelista, (essentially the vaults and the dome). He worked on this with master mason Pietro Cavazzolo. Zaccagni also was employed, along with his son Giovanni Francesco Zaccagni in helping design and build the church of Santa Maria della Steccata. Gianfrancesco Ferrari d’Agrate took over the work in 1525, as by then Zaccagni and his don were busy expanding the Benedictine monastery at San Giovanni.

In 1527, he directed the rebuilding of Sant'Alessandro.
