= Gian Francesco d'Agrate =

Italian sculptor and architect

Gian Francesco d'Agrate (1489- after 1563) was an Italian sculptor and architect, active principally in Parma. It this city, he labored in the construction and decoration of the Sanctuary of Santa Maria della Steccata with the help of his brother Marco, and under the guidance of Bernardino Zaccagni.
