= San Giovanni Evangelista, Parma =

Church in Parma, Italy

Coordinates: 44°48′10″N 10°19′57″E

Church of St John the Evangelist; Chiesa di San Giovanni Evangelista (Italian)
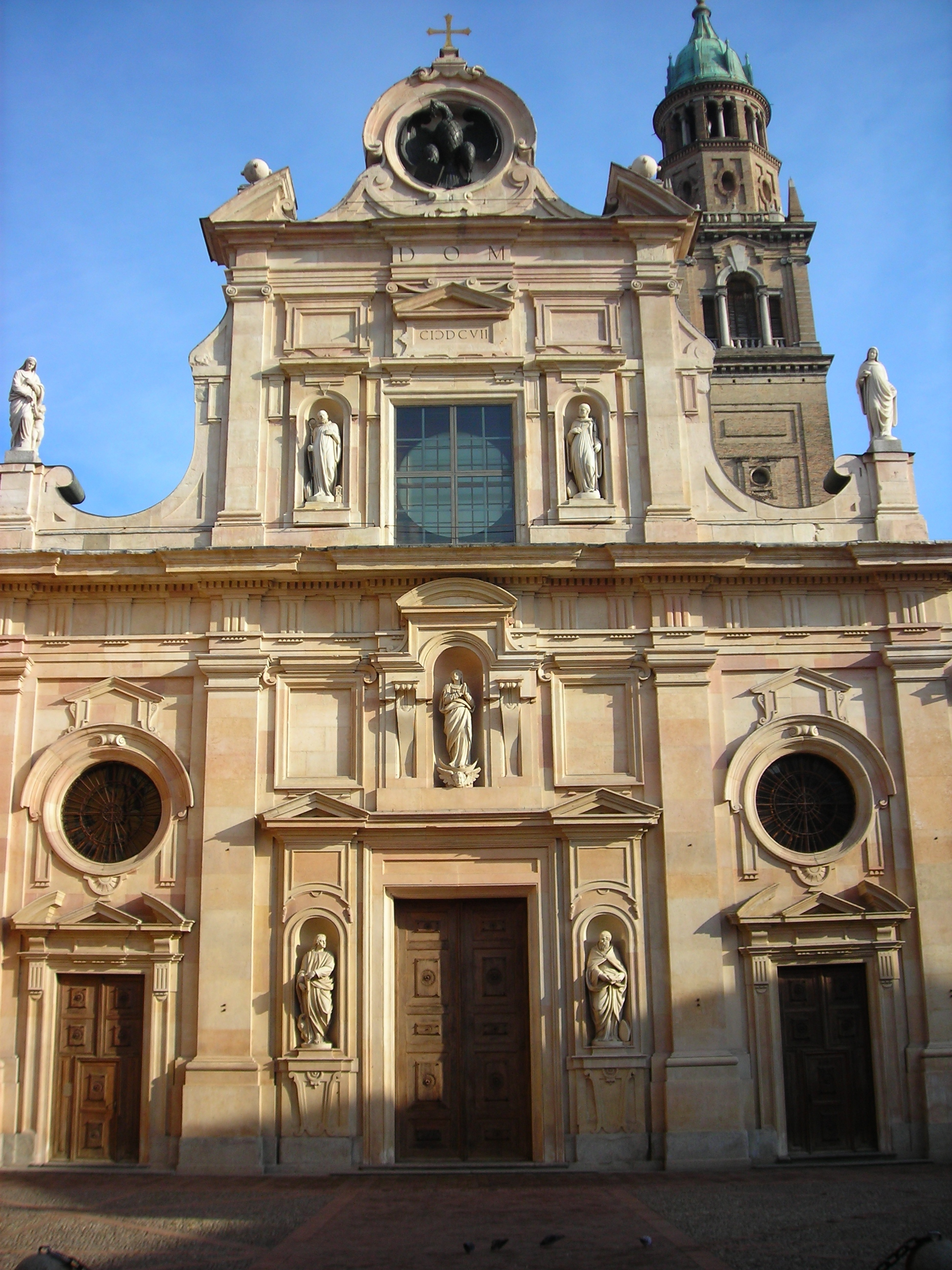
- Façade of the church

Religion
- Affiliation: Catholic

Location
- Location: Parma, Italy
- Interactive map of: Church of St John the Evangelist; Chiesa di San Giovanni Evangelista (Italian)

Architecture
- Architect: Bernardino Zaccagni
- Style: High Renaissance
- Groundbreaking: 1490
- Completed: 1519

San Giovanni Evangelista is a Mannerist-style, Roman Catholic church located on Piazzale San Giovanni, located just behind the apse of the Parma Cathedral, in the historic center of Parma, northern Italy. The buildings surrounding the piazza were also part of a former Benedictine convent. The church is notable for its Correggio frescoes.

== History ==
Construction of the abbey and church were begun in the 10th century under the patronage of then Bishop Sigefredus over a pre-existing oratory dedicated to Saint Colombanus. In 1477 the whole complex was damaged by a fire. The abbey basilica was rebuilt from around 1498 to 1510, according to a design by Bernardino Zaccagni. The abbey was suppressed in 1810, although the monks were able to return in 1817.

== Description ==
The marble façade of the church opens onto the Piazzale San Giovanni. The facade was designed by Simone Moschino of Orvieto in proto-Baroque, or Mannerist, style in 1604, and completed in 1607, as cited in the plaque below the tympanum. They tympanum has an eagle, symbol of St John the evangelist. It is decked with statues in niches or rooflines, and brackets and frames that have little architectural explanation. Above the lateral doors are two circular windows, while the upper story has a circular window with a square glass pane in front.

The bell tower on the right side, perhaps designed by Giovanni Battista Magnani, was completed in 1613. With a height of 75 meters, it is the tallest in Parma.

=== Interior ===
The interior layout has a Latin cross plan, with a nave and two aisles covered with cross vaults, and a dome at the crossing. The structure is similar to the nearby cathedral's. The grooved piers are Renaissance elements of classical inspiration.

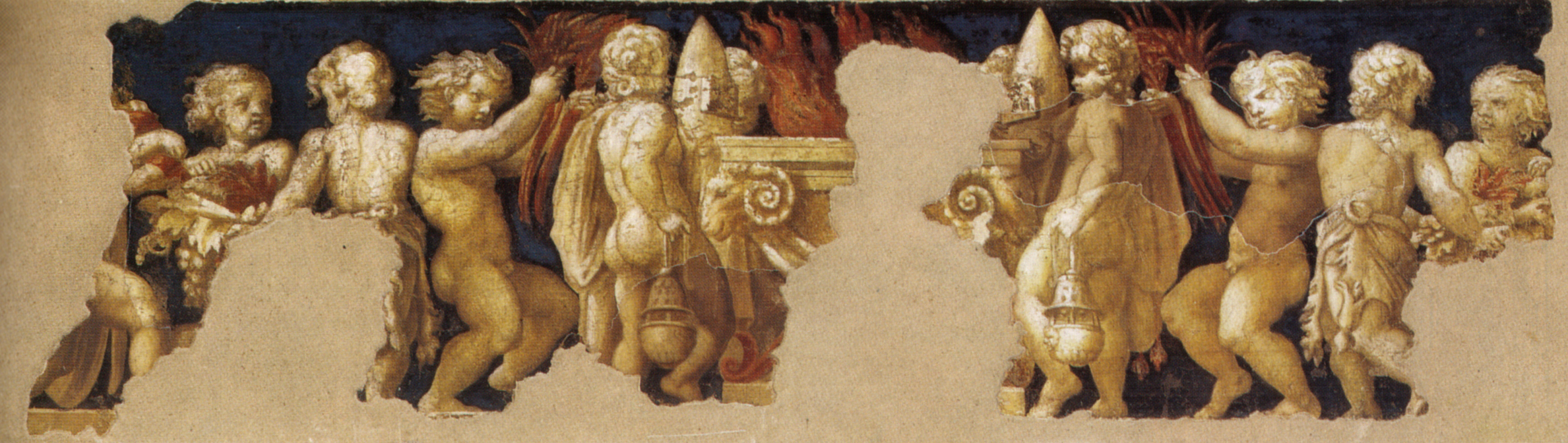
Detail of Correggio's frieze

The design included since the beginning a thoroughly painted decoration of the interior, and a contract had been signed with the young Correggio, who had already worked in another Benedictine monastery, in the Camera della Badessa of San Paolo. Correggio added a painted frieze which runs for the whole internal perimeter. It is long strip with monochrome paintings (with few red details) on a dark blue background, including also some tondos with portraits of Benedictine popes, cardinals and monks. The main feature is a series of puttos in actions symbolizing the importance of the Christian Mass and sacrifice. The grotesque decorations on the semi-piers and the vault decoration (with candelabra, puttos and symbols of St. John the Evangelist) were contributed (c. 1520) by Correggio's pupils, in particular Michelangelo Anselmi .

The ceiling of the left crossing was painted by Anselmi with a St. Benedict Enthroned and Four Saints (1521), while the walls show terracotta sculptures by Antonio Begarelli (St. John the Evangelist and Madonna with Child and St. John, c. 1543). In the arch of the right chapel of the presbytery are additional frescoes by Bedoli.

The right apse has ceiling frescoes of Stories from the Life of St. John of Parma by Anselmi. The altarpiece depicting the Miracle of St John was painted by Emilio Taruffi (1674). At the walls are two groups by Begarelli, portraying St. Felicita with Saint Vitalis and St. Benedict. The presbytery has grotesque decorations attributed to Correggio, while the puttos were added around 1588 by Innocenzo Martini; a fresco from 1587 replicates the original by Correggio, of which only the central part remains, now at the Galleria Nazionale di Parma.

The carved wooden choir by Marcantonio Zucchi, inlaid with floral motifs, views of towns and hills and musical instruments, runs around the apse. The sacristy was frescoed in 1508 by Cesare Cesariano.

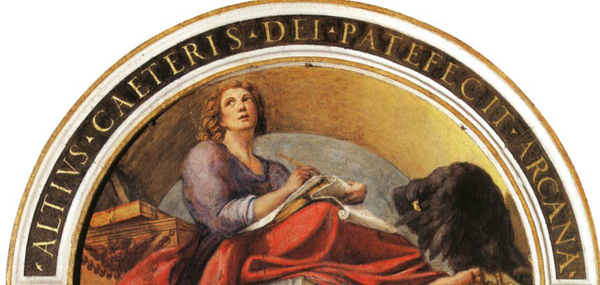
Lunette of St. John and the Eagle by Correggio

Correggio executed five frescoes groups. The first includes the portal leading to the sacristy with a fresco in the lunette, depicting St. John and the Eagle (c. 1520) and generally considered his first work in the church, although similarities with the dome decoration could imply that it dates from a later period. The inscription ALTIUS CAETERIS DEI PATEFECIT ARCAN around the painting refers to the nocturnal prayers of the monks.

This is followed by the dome, with a fresco traditionally referred to as the Vision of St. John at Patmos, and the drum and the four pendentives decoration. The third work was the decoration of the vault and the apse ceiling of the Cappella Maggiore, partially destroyed in 1586 when the choir was prolonged: today the central fragment with the Coronation of the Virgin (now at the Galleria nazionale di Parma) has survived. The fourth intervention was in the choir's walls, which were totally destroyed during its reconstruction. Preparatory drawings show that also the parts executed by his pupils were designed by Correggio, such as the candelabra in the presbytery's vault and the puttos on the cross-vaults. Behind the 17th century altar in polychrome marble is a large canvas of the Transfiguration by Girolamo Mazzola Bedoli (c. 1556).

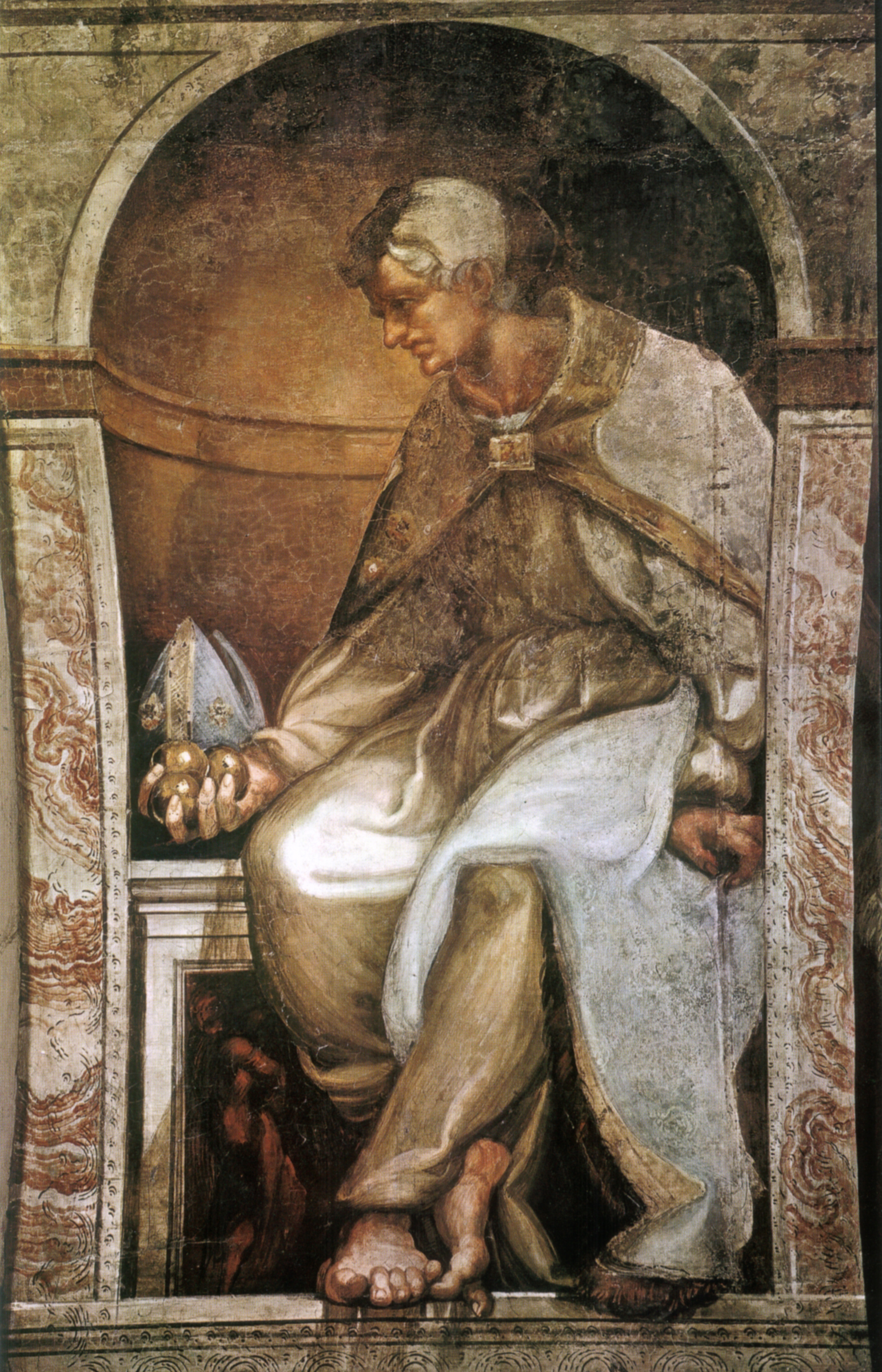
St. Nicholas by Michelangelo Anselmi

The left nave has a baptismal font whose base is a c. 1st century AD Roman funerary monument.

== Chapels ==
The twelve side chapels were frescoes by local artists (including Angelo Michele Colonna) in the late 16th century and early 17th century. The first chapel on the left has an arch frescoed by Parmigianino, with St Agatha and the Executioner and Saints Stephen and Lawrence. These are monumental figures influenced by Pordenone's frescoes in the Cathedral of Cremona.

Another Saints Stephen and Lawrence and a Saint Vitalis with the Horse, both by Parmigianino, are in the following chapel.

The altarpiece in the Zancheri Chapel, Mystical Marriage of St. Catherine of Alexandria (1536) is by Bedoli. Attributed to Parmigianino, but today considered by Anselmi, is a fresco cycle. Anselmi also painted a Christ Carrying the Cross (c. 1522) in the sixth left chapel.

Works in the right chapels include an Cristoforo Caselli's Adoration of the Magi (1449, third chapel), Bedoli's altarpiece of Madonna with Child and St. James (c. 1543–1545, fourth chapel), and a Nativity by Jacopo Francia.

Around 1524, Correggio also painted two canvasses for the Del Bono Chapel, now at the Galleria nazionale di Parma: the Lamentation for Dead Christ and the Martyrdom of Four Saints. There are 18th century copies of Correggio's canvasses in the Del Bono Chapel, whose arch has maintained frescoes executed by his pupils under his design (Conversion of St Paul and Saints Andrew and Peter).

== Monastery ==
The Benedectine monastery is on the left of the church entrance. It is a large complex with a chapter-house, a refectory, and three cloisters. The first, St. John Cloister (1537), has Ionic columns; the second, the Chapter Cloister (1500), has decorations by Correggio and the third, known as the Cloister of St. Benedict, has early 16th-century frescoes.

The associated library has manuscript and codexes testifying the amanuensis activity of the local monks. The manuscripts arrived here from the monastery of Santa Giustina in Padua without decorations, and here were decorated by Damiano da Moile, Francino da Moile and, starting from 1492, da Michele da Genova.

The monastery has also an ancient grocery, documented since 1201. Its dependences include the Abbey of Santa Maria della Neve at Torrechiara.

== See also ==
- 16th-century Western domes

== Sources ==
- Emilia-Romagna. Touring Editore. 1998.
- Adani, Giuseppe (2007). Correggio pittore universale. Correggio: Silvana Editoriale. ISBN 978-88-366-0977-2.
