= Oratory of Santa Maria delle Grazie, Parma =

Church building in Parma, Italy

Coordinates: 44.8032°N 10.3230°E

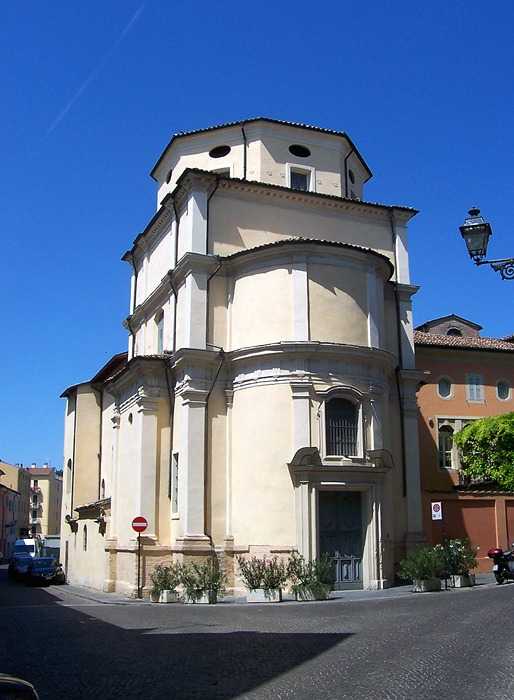
Main entrance with lantern.

The Oratory of Santa Maria delle Grazie (Holy Mary of the Graces), sometimes called a church, is a Baroque oratory in central Parma.

Construction of the Oratory began in 1617, under the designs of the local architect Gian Battista Magnani. In 1644, the architect Girolamo Rinaldi installed the peculiar octagonal lantern. The interior contains a number of Baroque paintings, including works (1715) by Sebastiano Galeotti.
