= San Benedetto, Parma =

Roman Catholic church in Emilia-Romagna, Italy

Coordinates: 44.80311°N 10.33637°E

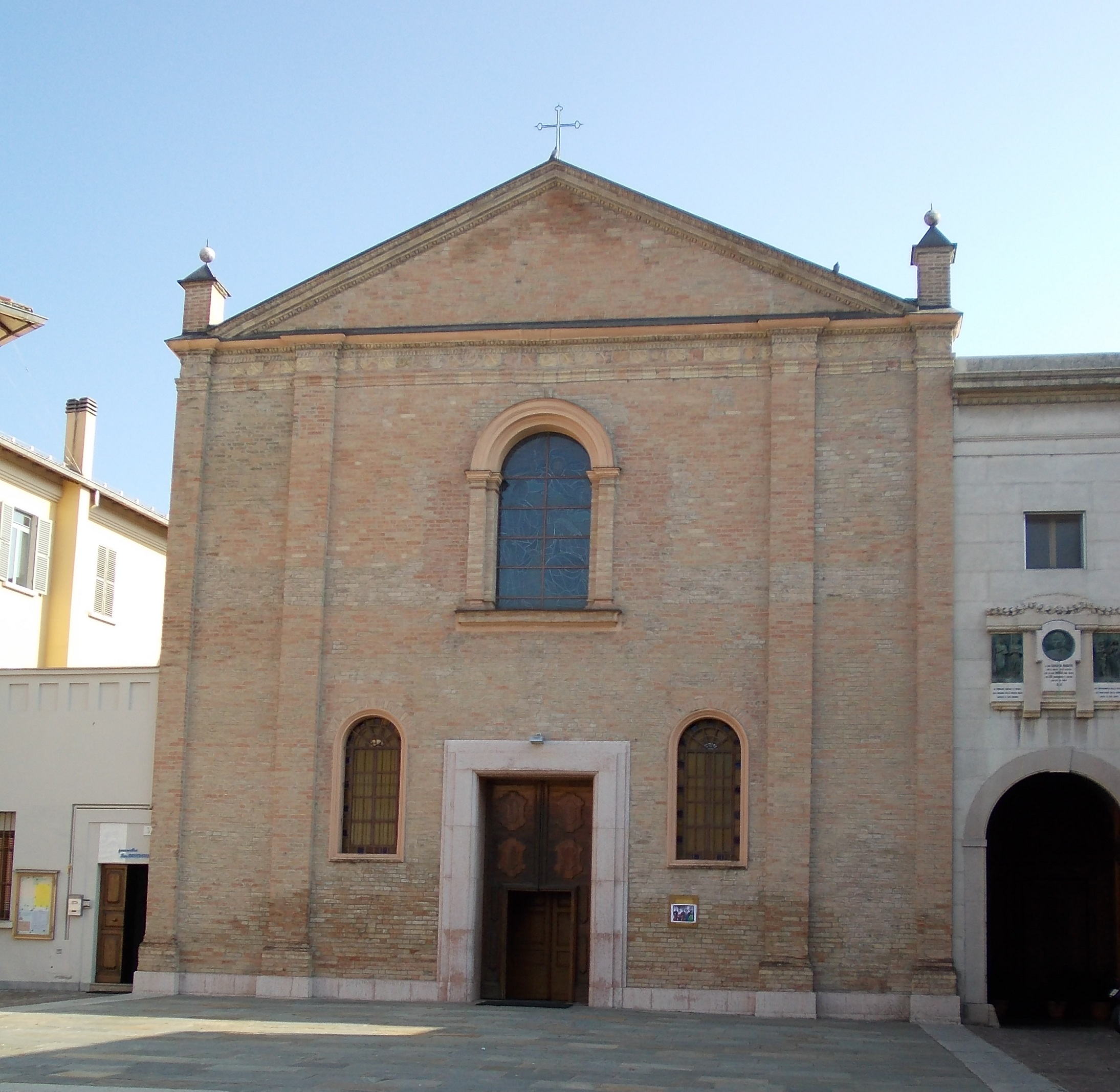
San Benedetto facade

Santa Benedetto is a Renaissance-style, Roman Catholic church located on Piazzale San Benedetto Da Norcia in Parma, region of Emilia-Romagna, Italy. The church and monastery are part of a high school, the Istituto Salesiano, run by the Salesian order.

== History ==
A Benedictine monastery was found at the site since 947. The church was rebuilt between 1491 and 1506 with designs by Pellegrino da Pontremoli, Bernardino Zaccagni and mastermason Angelo. The facade is sober and simple. Inside, are frescoes (1759) by Antonio Bresciani and Gaetano Ghidetti can still be seen in some of the side altars. The church has a single nave. In the late 16th century, the monastery was given to the Gesuati order by the Duke Ottavio Farnese. When that order was suppressed at the pope's behest in 1668, this became a parish church. The monastery became a refuge for fallen women.
