= Cristoforo Caselli =

Italian painter

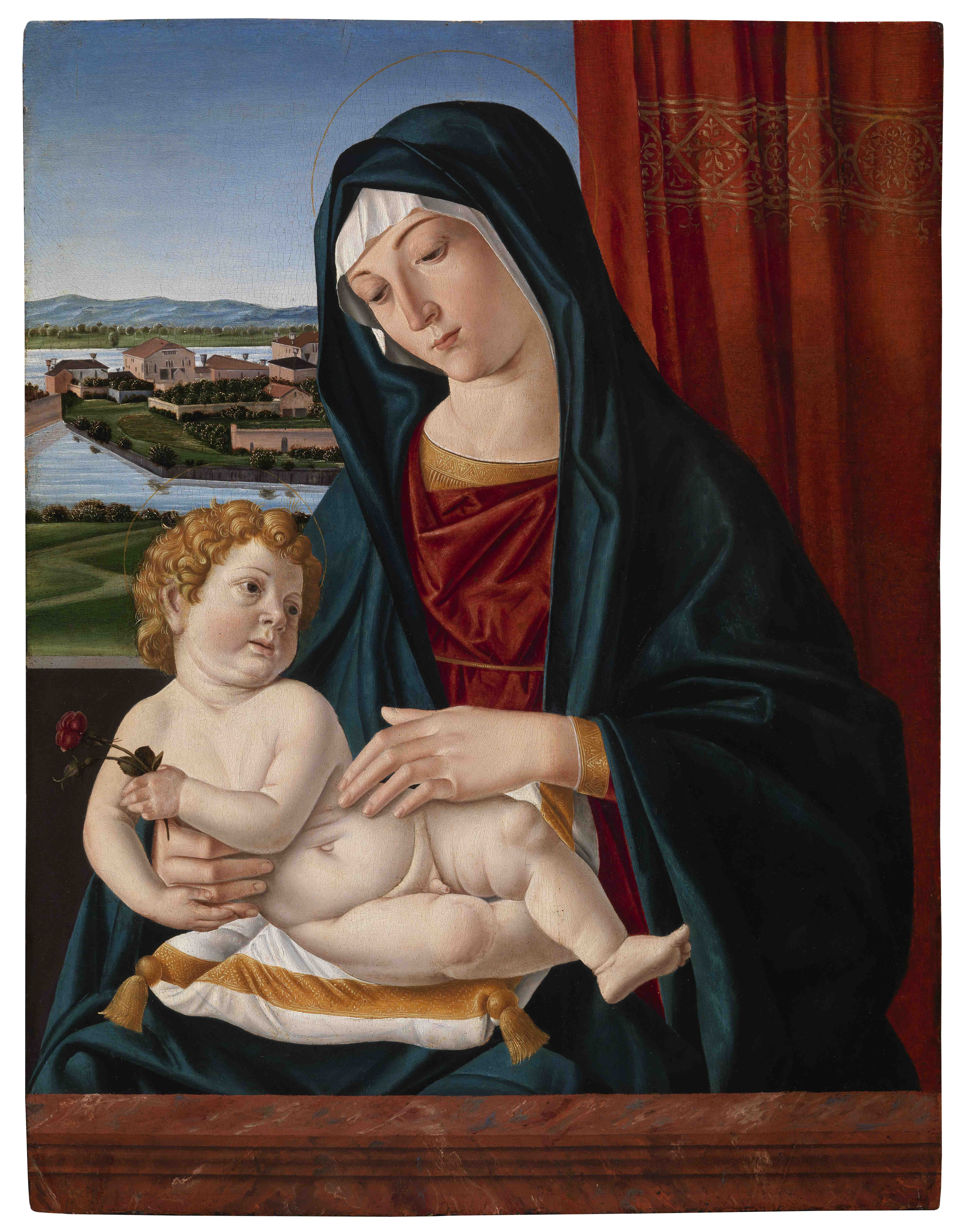
Madonna and Child with a rose on a Venetian lagoon background (1490) by Cristoforo Caselli

Cristoforo Caselli, also known as da Parma or il Temperello, (circa 1460 – 1521) was an Italian painter of the Renaissance period.

== Biography ==
Caselli was born in Parma. He earned his livelihood between 1489 and 1492 as a journeyman at Venice, where he painted, in 1495, an altar-piece now hanging in the Sacristy of Santa Maria della Salute. The Gallery of Parma contains a Virgin and Child, with SS. John the Baptist and Jerome, probably painted by him before 1489. He was a contemporary of the painter, later engraver from Parma, Francesco Marmitta.

He is also documented as working from 1489 to 1495 alongside Giovanni Bellini and Alvise Vivarini and others, in the decoration of the Great Council Hall in the Doge's Palace in Venice. These works were lost in the fire of 1577.

In 1496, he became a master at Parma, where he may have later worked with Parmigianino (born 1503), and painted in 1499 a Virgin and Child between Saints Hilarios and John the Baptist which is in the Sala del Consorzio in that city. The same year, he executed The Eternal on a gold ground in a chapel of the Parma Cathedral, and an Adoration of the Magi in San Giovanni Evangelista. In 1507 he finished the monochrome of the Dead Christ in the cathedral.

== Gallery ==
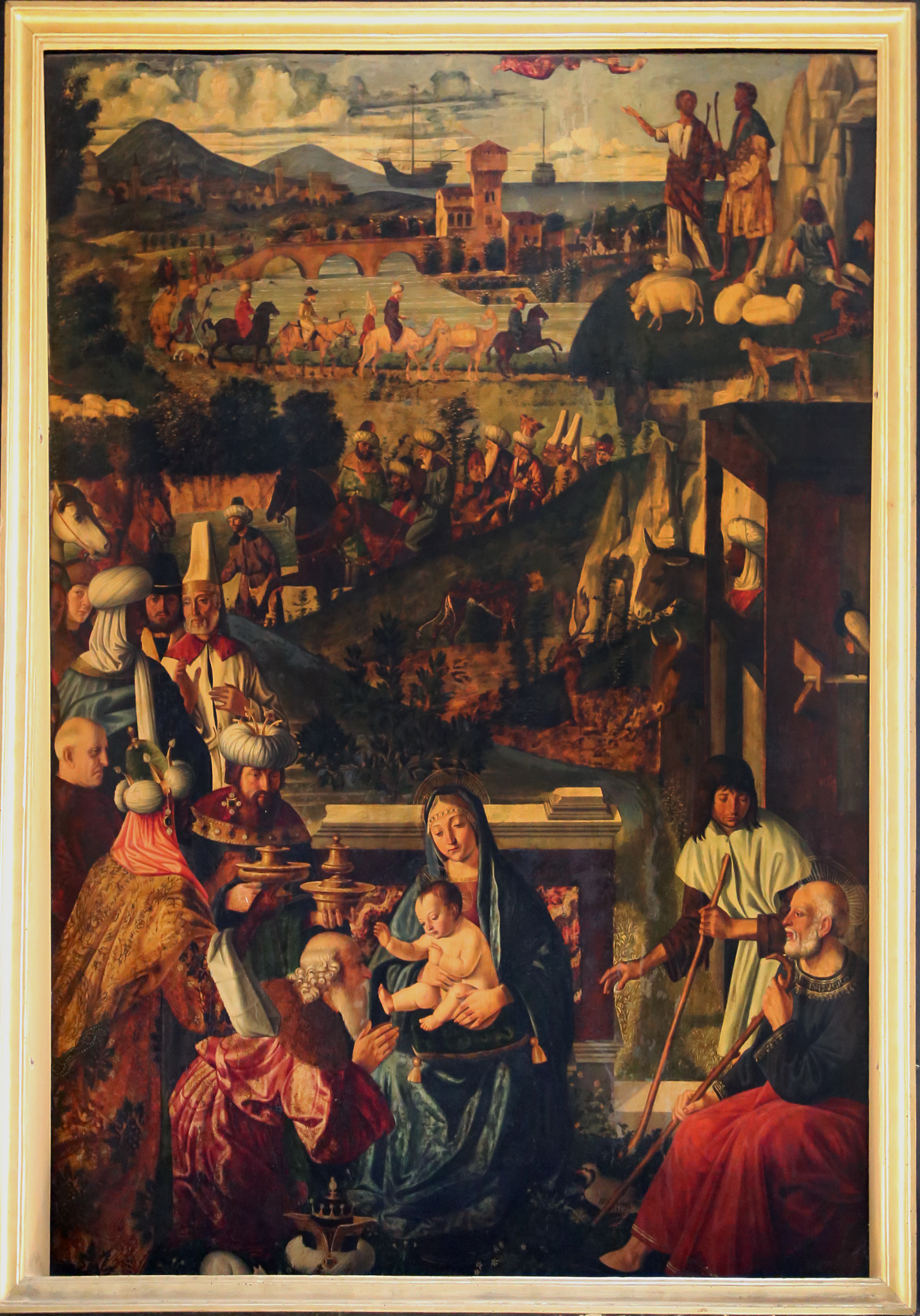
Adoration of the Magi (1499)

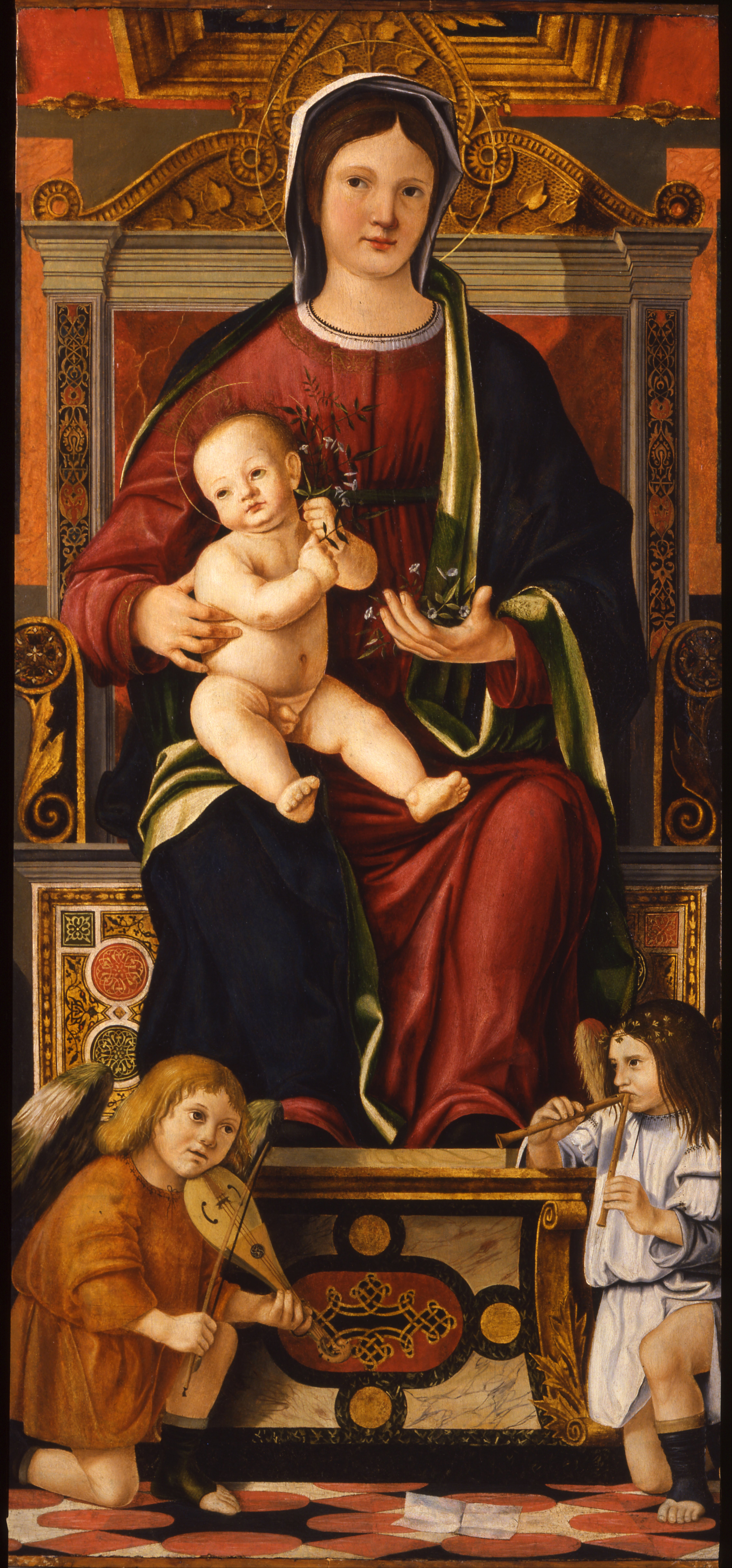
The Virgin and Child Enthroned with Two Musician Angels (1507 - 1510)

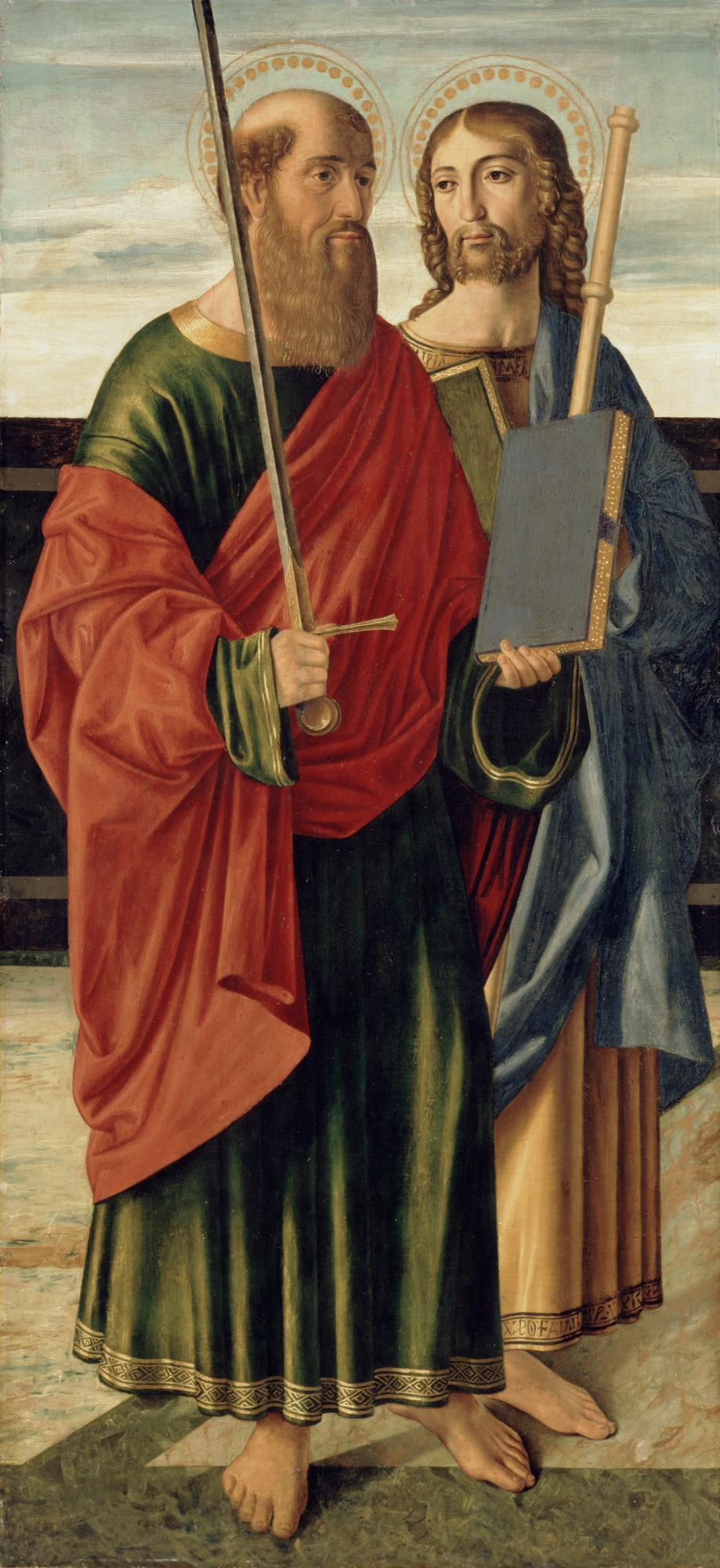
Saint Paul and Saint James the Elder

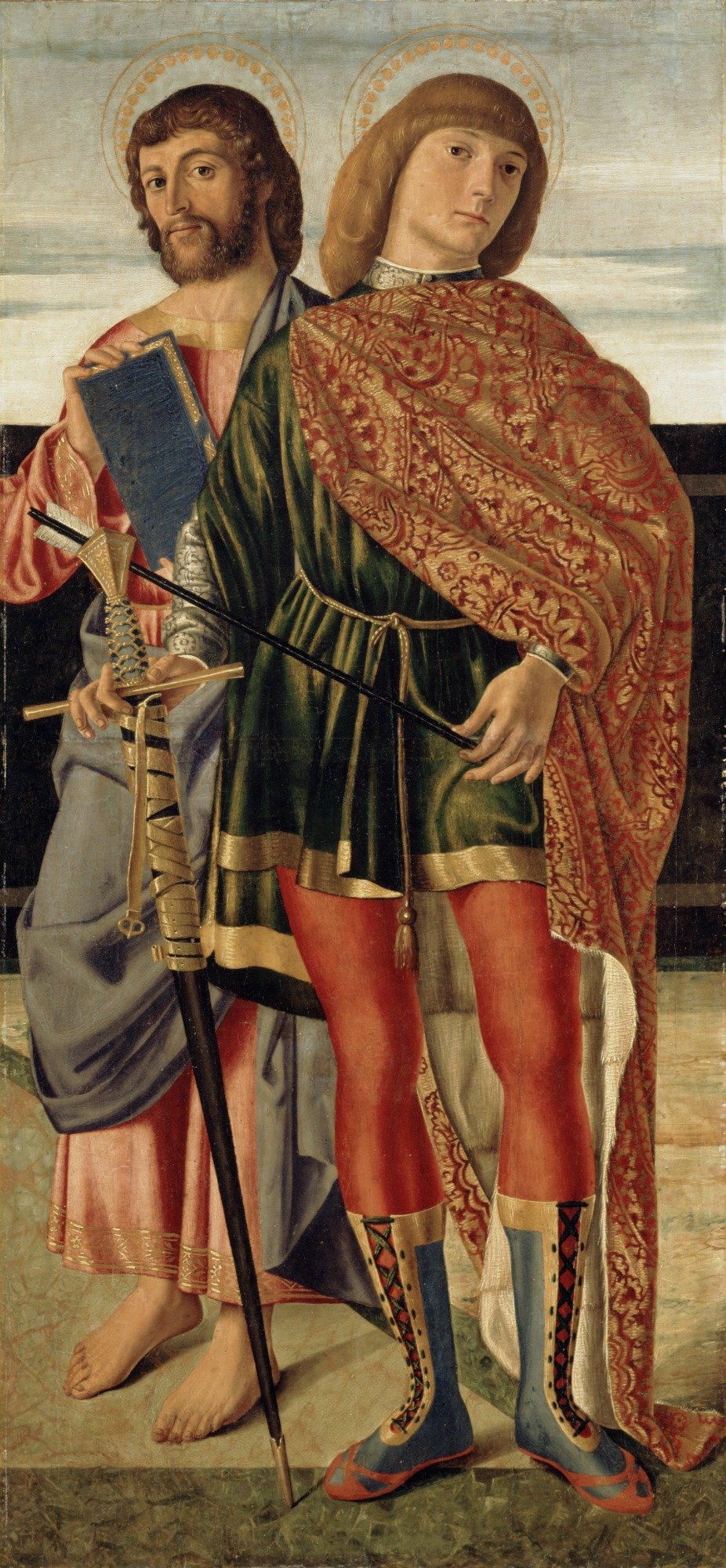
Saint Matthew and Saint Sebastian

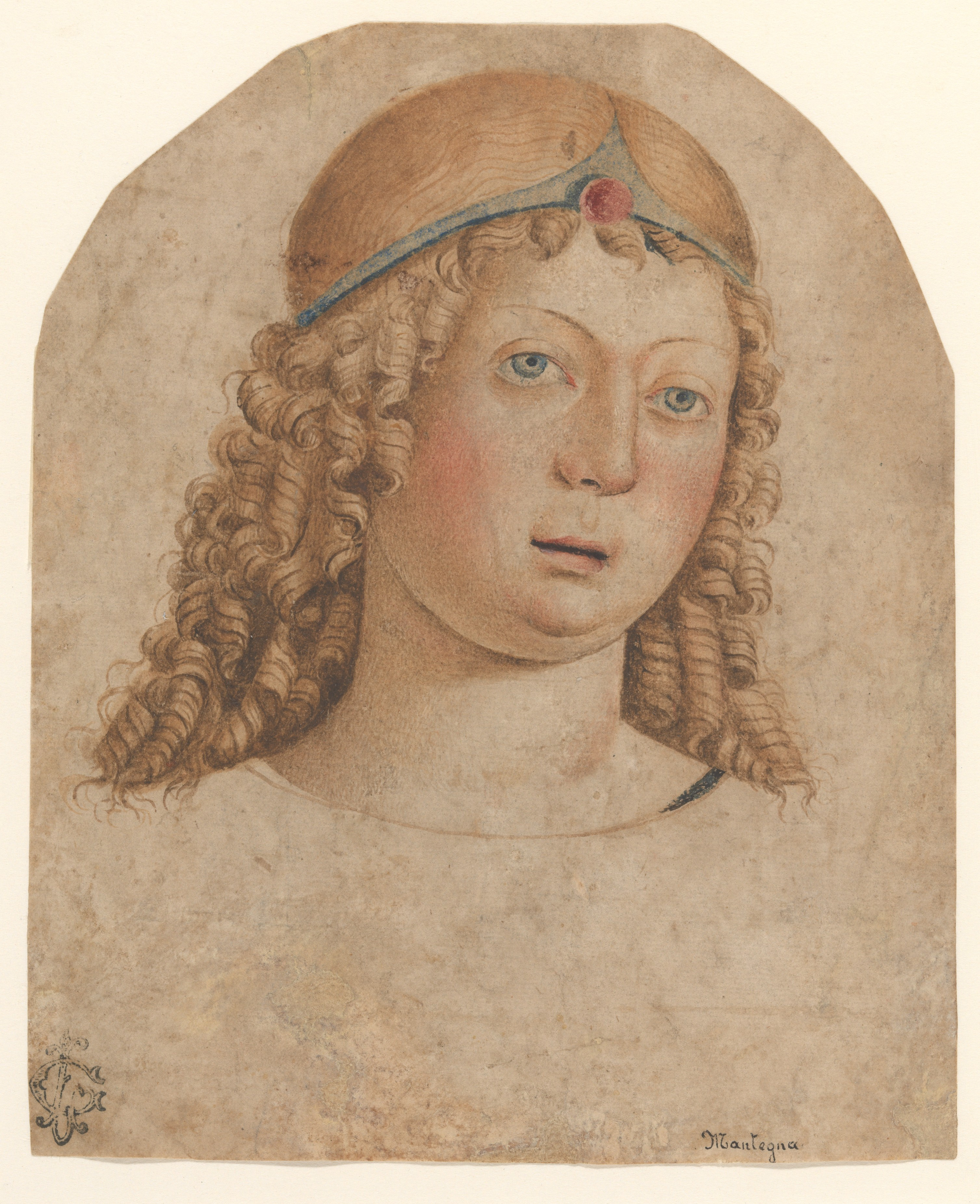
Head of a Youth with a Diadem
