= Berthold of Parma =

Italian Roman Catholic saint (died 1111)

Saint Berthold
- Born: Parma, Italy
- Died: 1111; Parma, Italy
- Venerated in: Roman Catholic Church
- Feast: 21 October

Berthold (died 1111) was a Benedictine lay brother (oblate).

Berthold was born in Parma, Italy, to where his Anglo-saxon parents ultimately fled after the Norman conquest of England. He was putatively pledged to the monastery at the age of 12 years.

Berthold spent the majority of his life serving nuns in Parma, at the Benedictine Monastery of Sant'Alessandro. As a young man, he made various pilgrimages, including to Rome, and to the burial spot of Saint Anthony of Vienne in Isere. Back in Parma, he helped in the monastery and with the infirm at their hospital. While a number of miracles were attributed to prayers or encounters with Berthold, he was never canononized.
