= Nicola Bettoli =

Italian architect

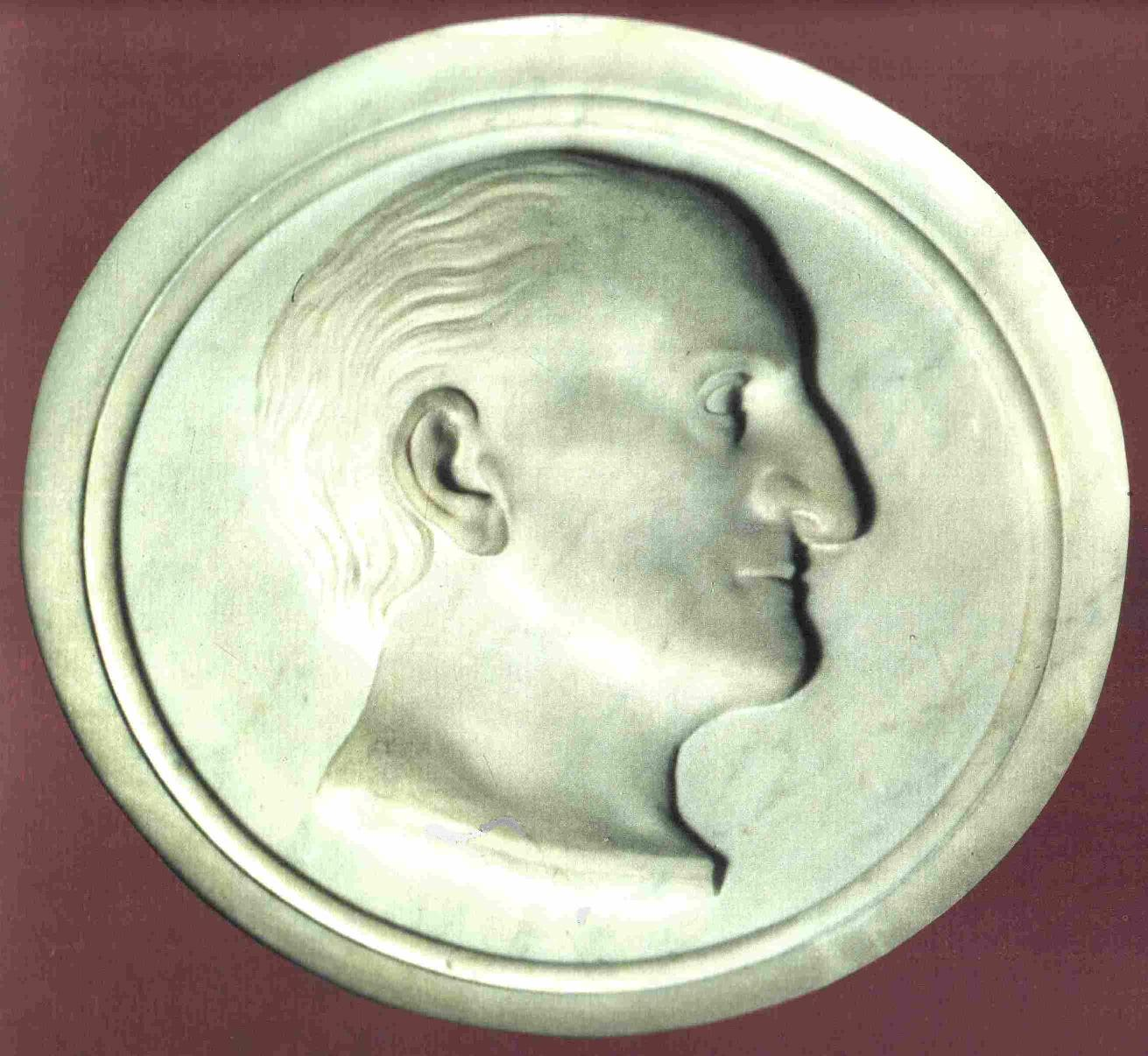
- Nicola Bettoli
- Born: 3 September 1780; Parma, Duchy of Parma
- Died: 16 July 1854 (aged 73); Parma, Duchy of Parma
- Occupation: Architect
- Buildings: Teatro Regio

Nicola or Niccolò Bettoli (3 September 1780 – 16 July 1854) was an Italian architect. He was the most prominent of a long line of architects in Parma named Bettoli and practised in an eclectic, Neoclassical style. he is best known as the designer of the Neoclassical Teatro Regio (Royal Theatre) of that city for Duchess Marie Louise which was begun in 1821 and inaugurated on 16 May 1829.

== Biography ==
=== Early life ===
Born in Parma, He studied privately, probably with Domenico Artusi (1754–1830), and seems to have been influenced by Ennemond Alexandre Petitot, an exponent of French Neoclassicism and architect to the Dukes of Parma. Bettoli’s early work, including designs for a triumphal arch (1811) honouring Napoleon and for the refacing of the Arch of San Lazzaro, Parma, indicates that he allied himself with the Establishment.

=== Court architect ===
Controversy over his designs for a new theatre in Parma (now the Teatro Regio) did not stop his appointment in 1816 as court architect to Marie Louise, Duchess of Parma, the second wife of Napoleon and former Empress of France. Under her patronage, he undertook the restoration of the Teatro Farnese, the Camera di San Paolo and the church of Santa Maria del Quartiere and designed major additions (1821–5) to the royal art galleries in the Palazzo della Pilotta, the Sala di Maria Luigia (1834) in the Biblioteca Palatina and the Palazzo Ducale (1836–7).

His best-known work is the Teatro Regio (1821–9), which has an Ionic portico leading to a grand foyer. In the auditorium are four tiers of stucco-fronted boxes with a lofty, coffered ceiling and a shallow dome painted to depict classical and contemporary Italian dramatists, the whole giving an effect of restrained opulence. Other important buildings were the Beccherie (1836), a Doric arcaded meat market, and the Tempietto del Petrarca (1839), near Selvapiana.

In 1823 Bettoli was appointed head of architecture at the Accademia di Belle Arti. His son Luigi Bettoli (1820–74) also taught at the Accademia and was an official state architect.

== Gallery ==
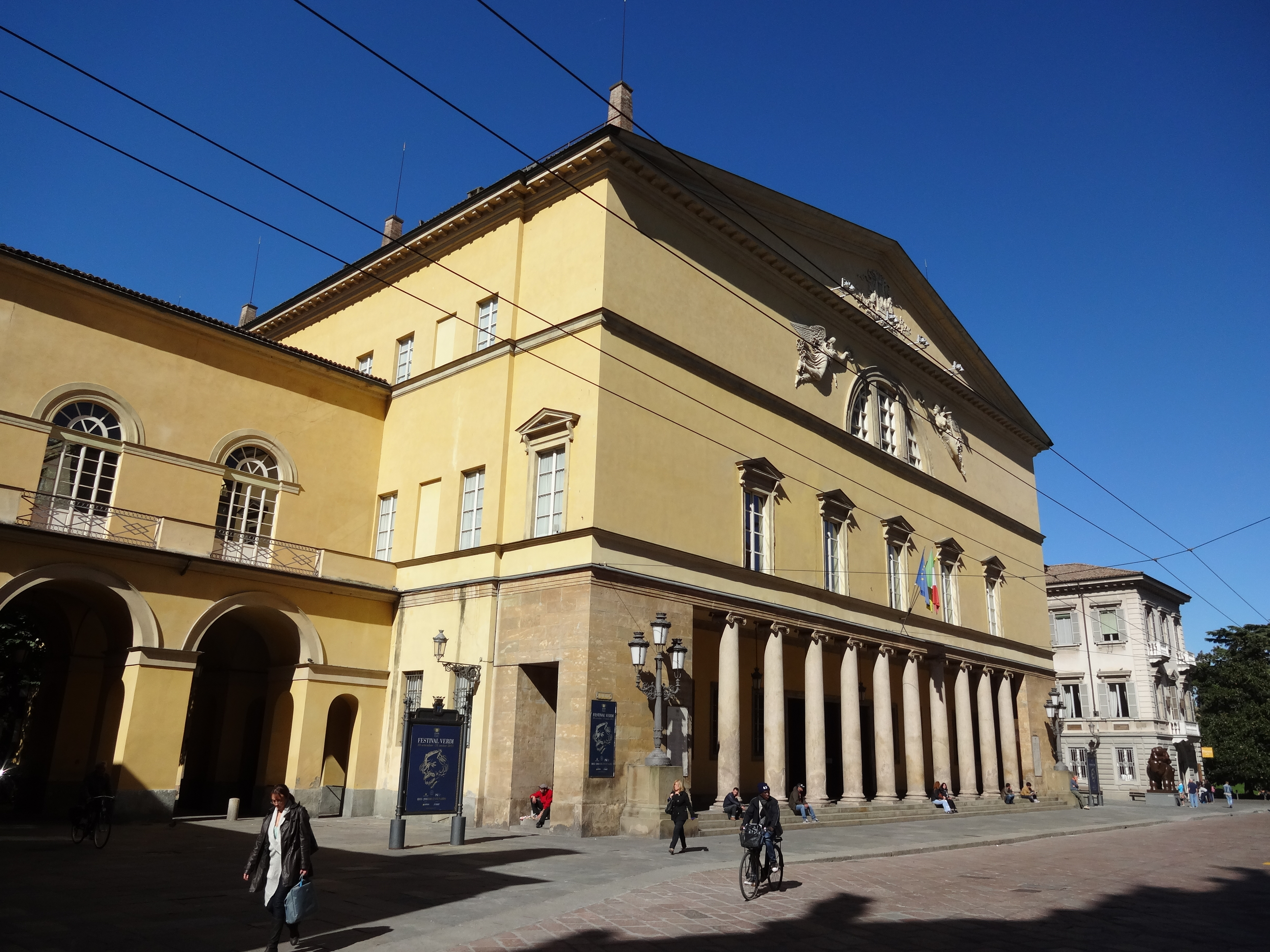
Teatro Regio, Parma

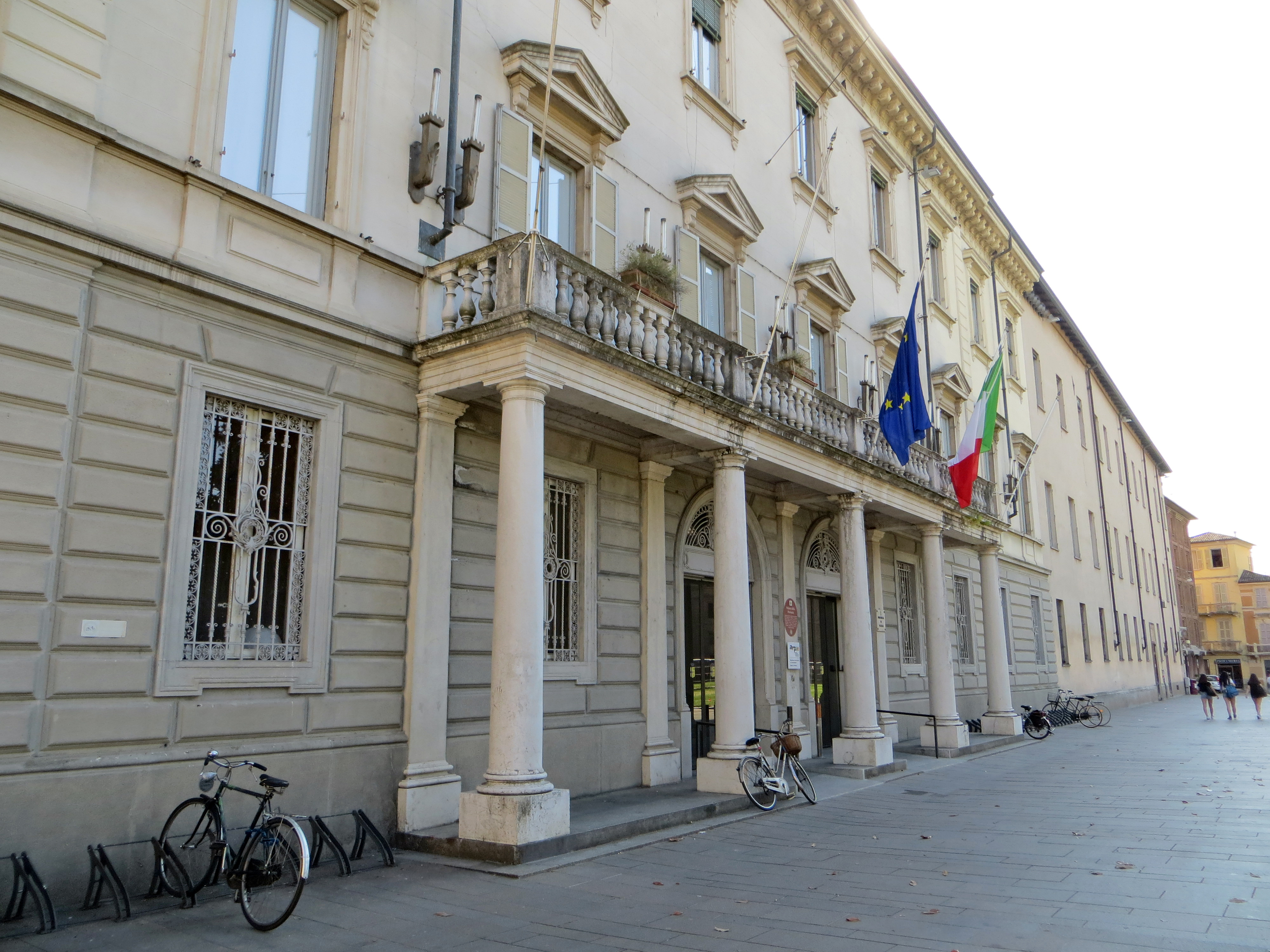
Palazzo della Provincia, Parma

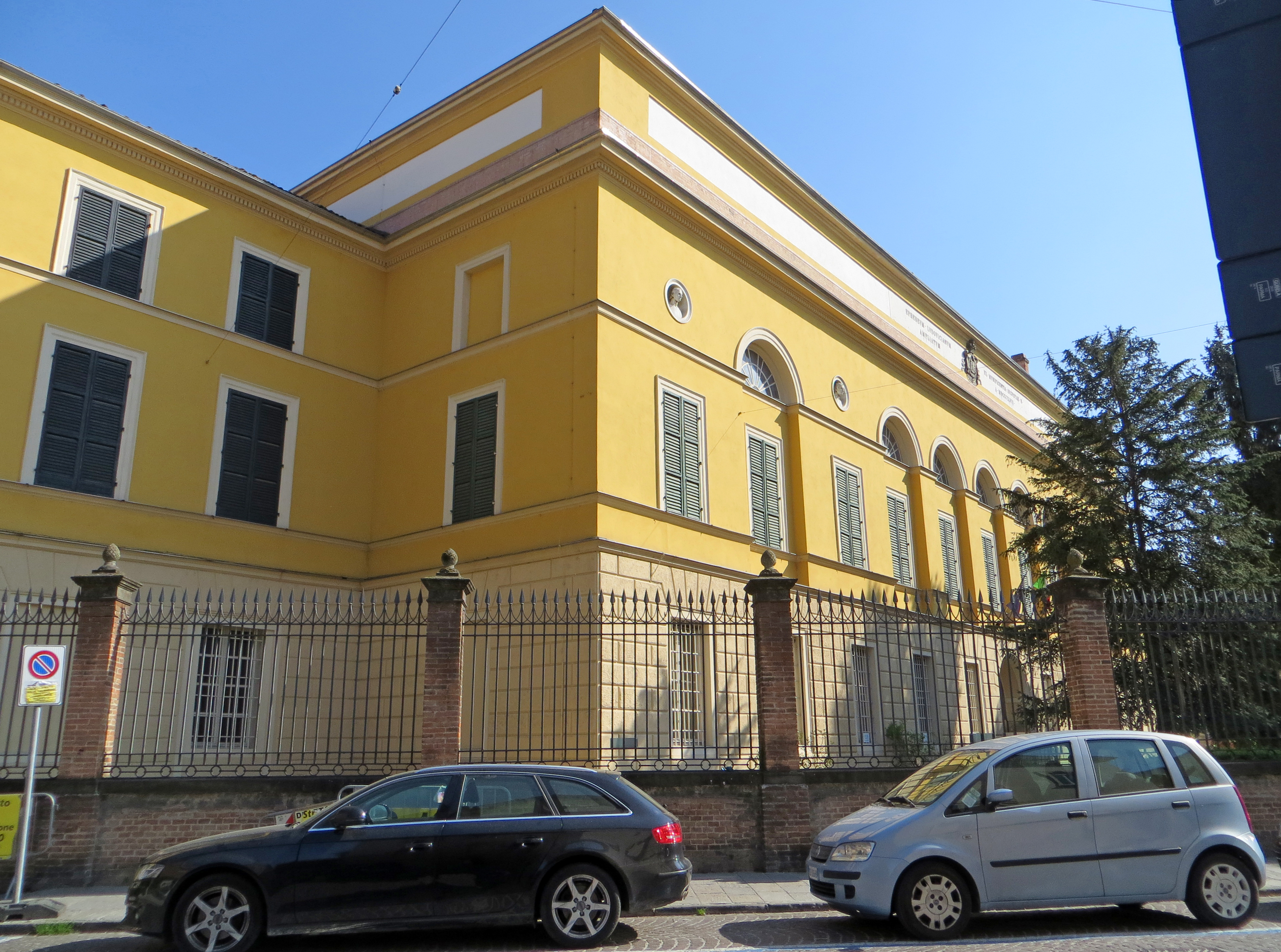
Collegio Maria Luigia, Parma
