= Arch of San Lazzaro, Parma =

Coordinates: 44°47′45.4″N 10°20′52.4″E

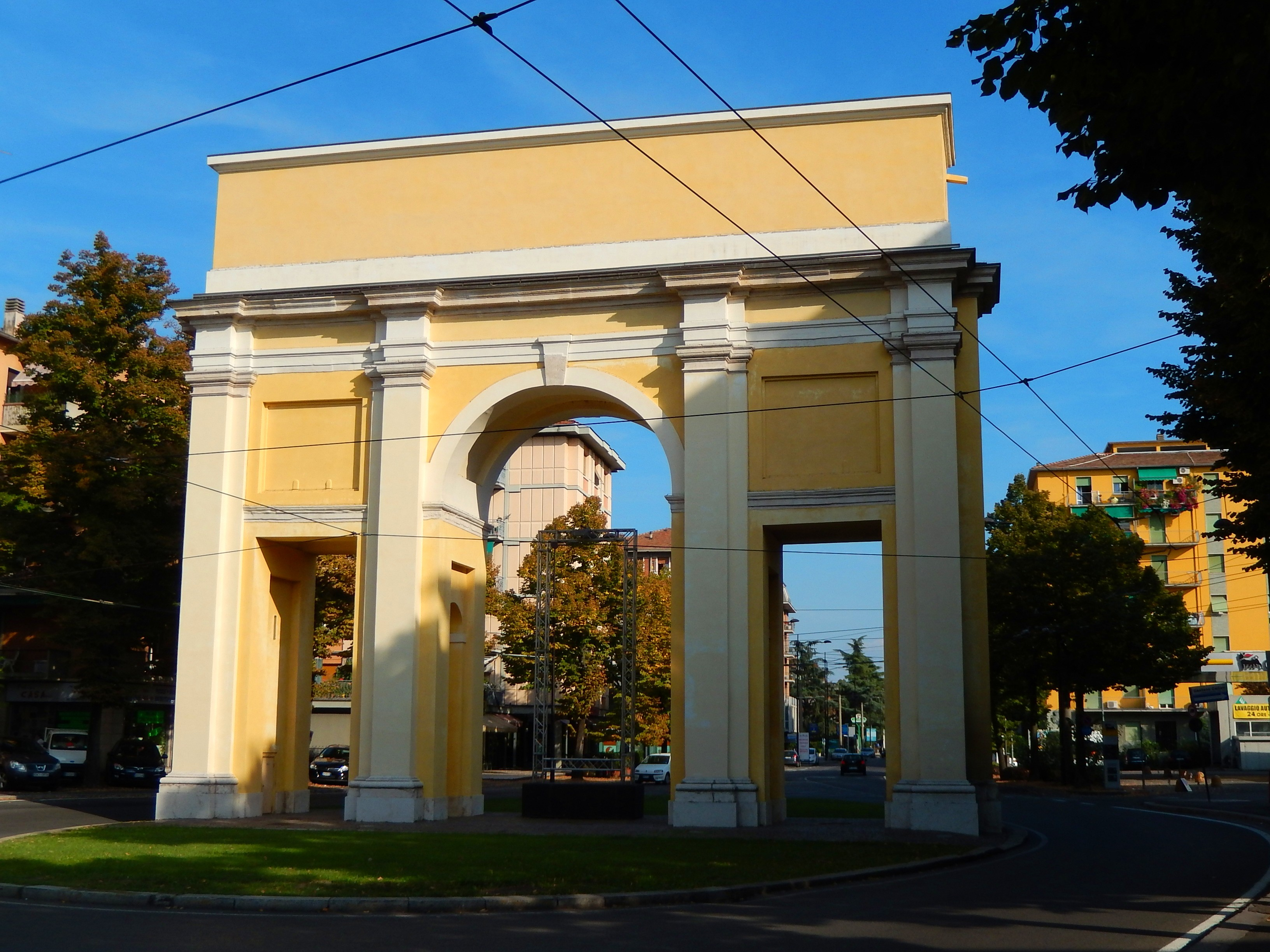
Arch of San Lazzaro

The Arch of San Lazzaro (Italian: Arco di San Lazzaro) is a triumphal arch that stands just outside and east of the city of Parma, Region of Emilia-Romagna. It was constructed in 1628 under the designs of Giovanni Battista Magnani to celebrate the arrival to the city of Margherita de’ Medici, the new wife of the then Duke Odoardo Farnese. At the time of its construction, the panels of the arch were painted by Pomponio Amidano with historical tableaus, depicting

1. Marcus Aemilius Lepidus founds a Roman Colony in Parma.
2. Parma sends Citizens to Rome to aid them during Floods.
3. The siege of Parma by Legates of Sulla urging rebellion against Rome.
4. Parma offers 1,000 citizens to protect Julius Caesar.
5. Frederick II defeat in the 1248 Battle of Parma.
6. Celebration of the victory with dedications to the Virgin.

The paintings were decayed over time and in 1819 were replaced to celebrate the visit to Parma of the Austrian Emperor.
