= Teatro Regio (Parma) =

Opera house in Parma, Italy

Coordinates: 44°48′11″N 10°19′38″E

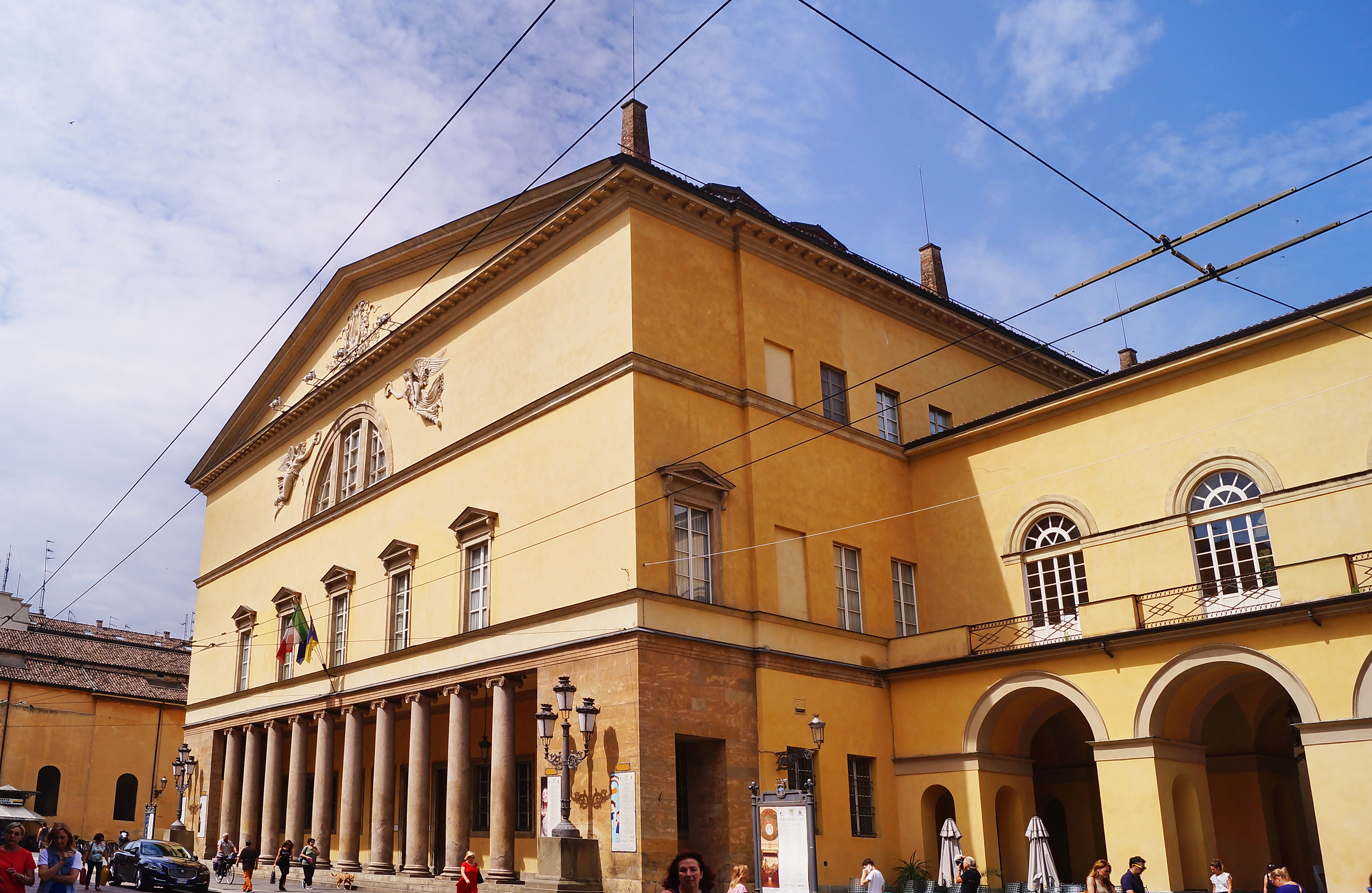
Exterior of the Teatro Regio in Parma, 2018

Teatro Regio di Parma, originally constructed as the Nuovo Teatro Ducale (New Ducal Theatre), is an opera house and opera company in Parma, Italy.

Replacing an obsolete house, the new Ducale achieved prominence in the years after 1829, and especially so after the composer Giuseppe Verdi, who was born near Busseto, some thirty kilometres away, had achieved fame. Also well known in Parma was the conductor Arturo Toscanini, born there in 1867.

As has been noted by Lee Marshall, "while not as well known as La Scala in Milan or La Fenice in Venice, the city’s Teatro Regio....is considered by opera buffs to be one of the true homes of the great Italian tradition, and the well-informed audience is famous for giving voice to its approval or disapproval – not just from the gallery."

The 1,400-seat auditorium, with four tiers of boxes topped by a gallery, was inaugurated on 16 May 1829 when it presented the premiere of Vincenzo Bellini's Zaira, a production which was staged another seven times, although it did not prove to be popular with the Parma audiences. Initially Rossini had been invited to compose a work for the inauguration of the house, but he was too busy and so the task fell to Bellini. However, that inaugural season saw three Rossini operas staged, including Moïse et Pharaon, Semiramide, and Il barbiere di Siviglia.

Today, the company stages about four operas each season from mid January to April and, since 2003, it has presented an annual Verdi Festival each October.

== Construction of the Teatro Ducale ==
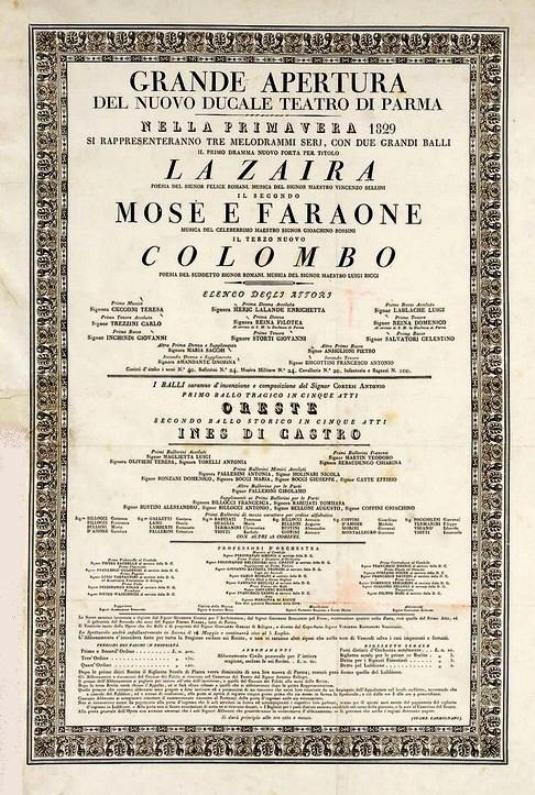
Poster for the opening night of the Nuovo

There had been a Ducal Theatre in Parma since the 17th century, the principal one being the Teatro Farnese constructed in 1618, but it was used only nine times, the last one occurring in October 1732, after which it suffered from years from neglect and further damage by American bombing in World War II. It was rebuilt in 1966.

However, the "Nuovo" replaced another existing "small and narrow" Ducal Theatre dating from 1688, which had been located in the Palazzo di Riserva. The 1,200-seat theatre was becoming obsolete due to a variety of factors, including the need to appeal to an increasing middle class desire to experience opera, but also allow for "separate and well articulated private and public spaces". After a performance of Rossini's Zelmira in 1828, it was closed and then demolished.

The newly built "Nuovo Ducale" was located on the site of the former Monastery of St. Alexander and it was located next to the Ducal Palace. Construction began in 1821 during the reign of Marie Louise, Duchess of Parma who, as Napoleon I's divorced second wife, preferred divorce rather than exile. She settled in Parma, ruling from 1816 to 1847, and under her patronage and financial support, secured the services of the architect Nicola Bettoli. Marie Louise oversaw the construction, assuring that the interior decoration reflected "the sobriety of neoclassicism and the colours white and light blue".

In 1849, restoration was called for and then, four years later under the Bourbon Duke Carlo III, more opulent decoration took place. This included the replacement of the neoclassical elements with the more sensual aspects of the mid-19th century; as Martini notes, "this rendered the theatre more splendid with extensive use of red velvet and golden ornamentation. In addition, gas lighting in the house was installed. By 1907, the stage lighting was electrified, and that of the rest of house took place during the centennial of Verdi's birth in 1913.

The architecture of the "Nuovo"

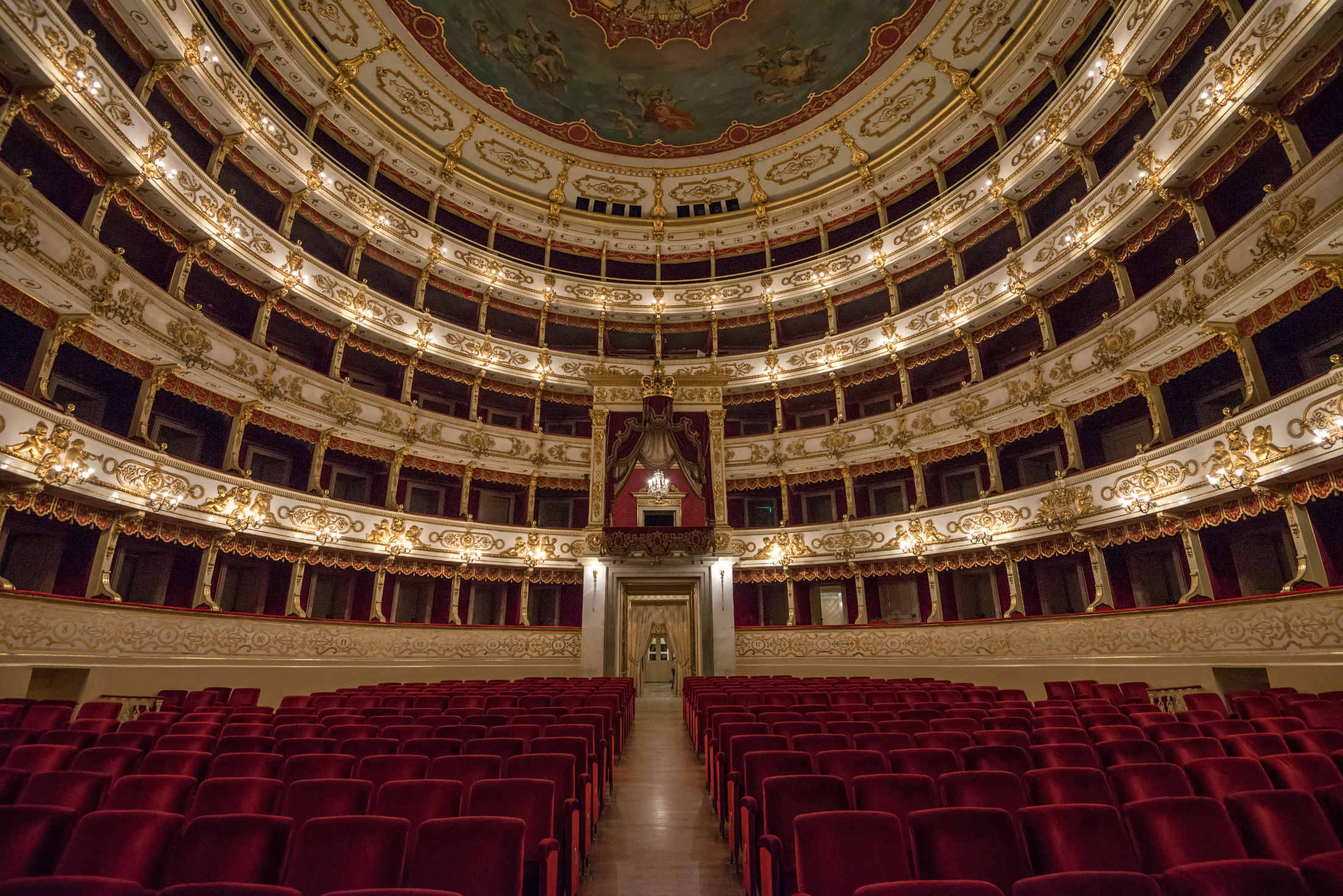
The auditorium of the Teatro Regio

The façade of the theatre was built in the neoclassical style, which has remained unchanged over the years. With a colonnade of ten Ionic granitic columns at the base, which created an arcade, this supports five imperial-style windows above, topped by a tympana and decorative elements enrich the highest part of the facade with one central semi-circular window, besides bas-reliefs by Tommaso Bandini of two muses at one lyra in the central and lateral position.

The foyer is, as Martini describes it, a "large square upheld by four pairs of imposing mottled marble Ionic columns on an attic base..... The entire room is based on the square and on symmetry". It is decorated with a marble floor.

After the 1853 restoration, which overall has been described as neo-Baroque ("[It radiat[es] gold, ivory, and maroon" colours), the ceiling of the auditorium was decorated by Giovan Battista Borghesi with frescoes of the most famous playwrights. This remains today. The chandelier, which was built in Paris and taken to Parma in 1854 when the theatre was adapted for gas, is 4.5 metres in height and weighs 1100 kg.

Renaming the theatre

After the reign of Duchess Marie Louise, the theatre was renamed and between 1849 and 1860, it was known as the "Teatro Reale". With the unification of Italy in 1861, the house took its present name, the Teatro Regio.

== Verdi and the Teatro Regio ==
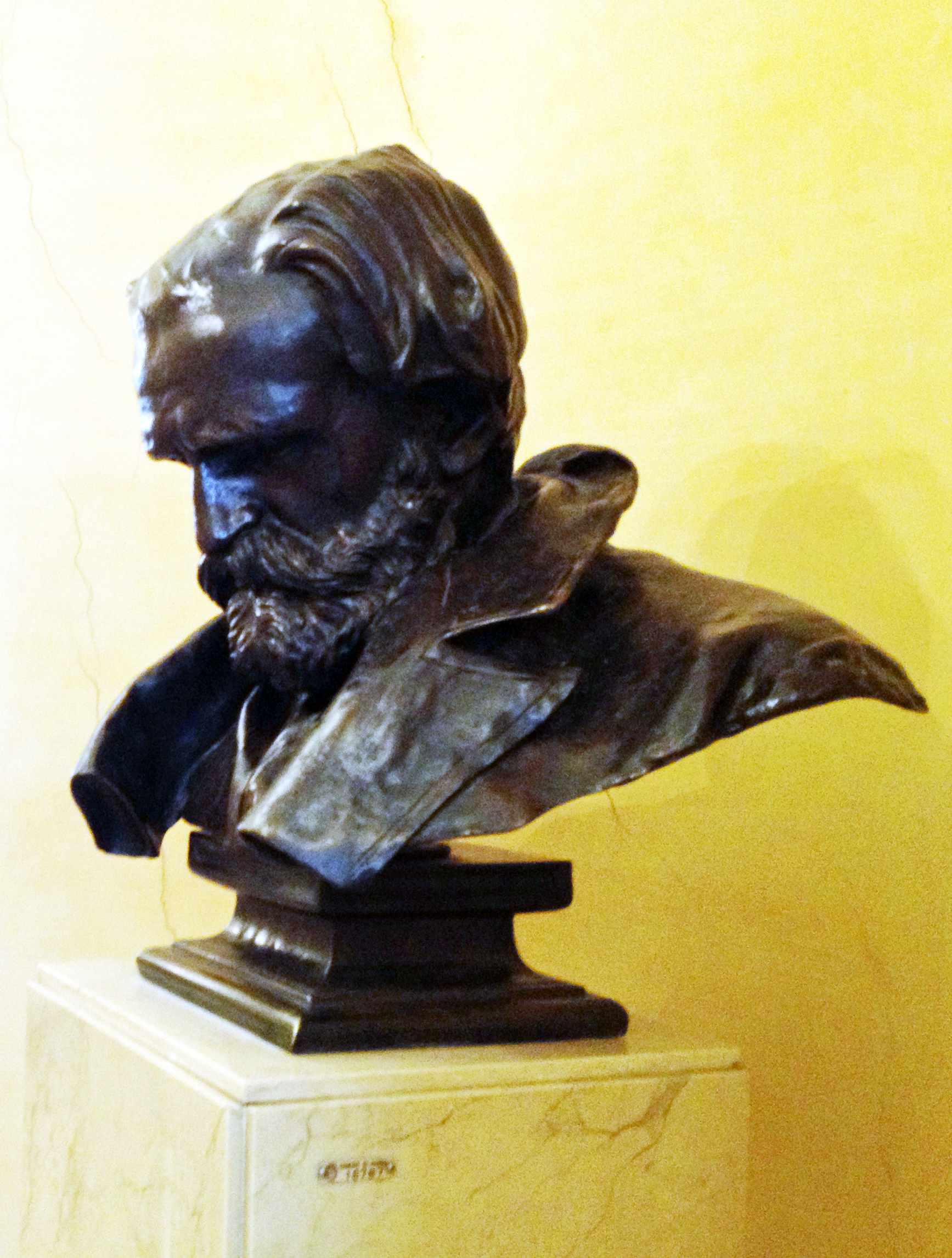
Bust of Verdi in the foyer

Verdi, who was born and who grew up only 20 miles from Parma, was perhaps quite naturally soon adopted by the city as its native son, especially as his fame grew after the success of the 1840 Nabucco. His operas have had a special place in the Regio's programming after 17 April 1843, when Verdi came to direct his Nabucco. Since that time, the Regio has staged every one of his operas, including adaptations of original versions such as I Lombardi of 1843, which became Jérusalem for Paris in 1847 or the 1847 Macbeth which was revised in 1865.

The seasons surrounding the centennial of his birth in 1813 and the 50th anniversary of his death in 1951 were devoted solely to his operas, and between 1829 and 1979, Verdi, Donizetti, and Bellini were the most frequently staged composers, with Verdi topping the list with five of his operas, the most frequent of which was Aida with 177 performances over the 150-year period. The 2001 centennial of the composer's death resulted in a year-long celebration beginning with the Requiem and including six operas.

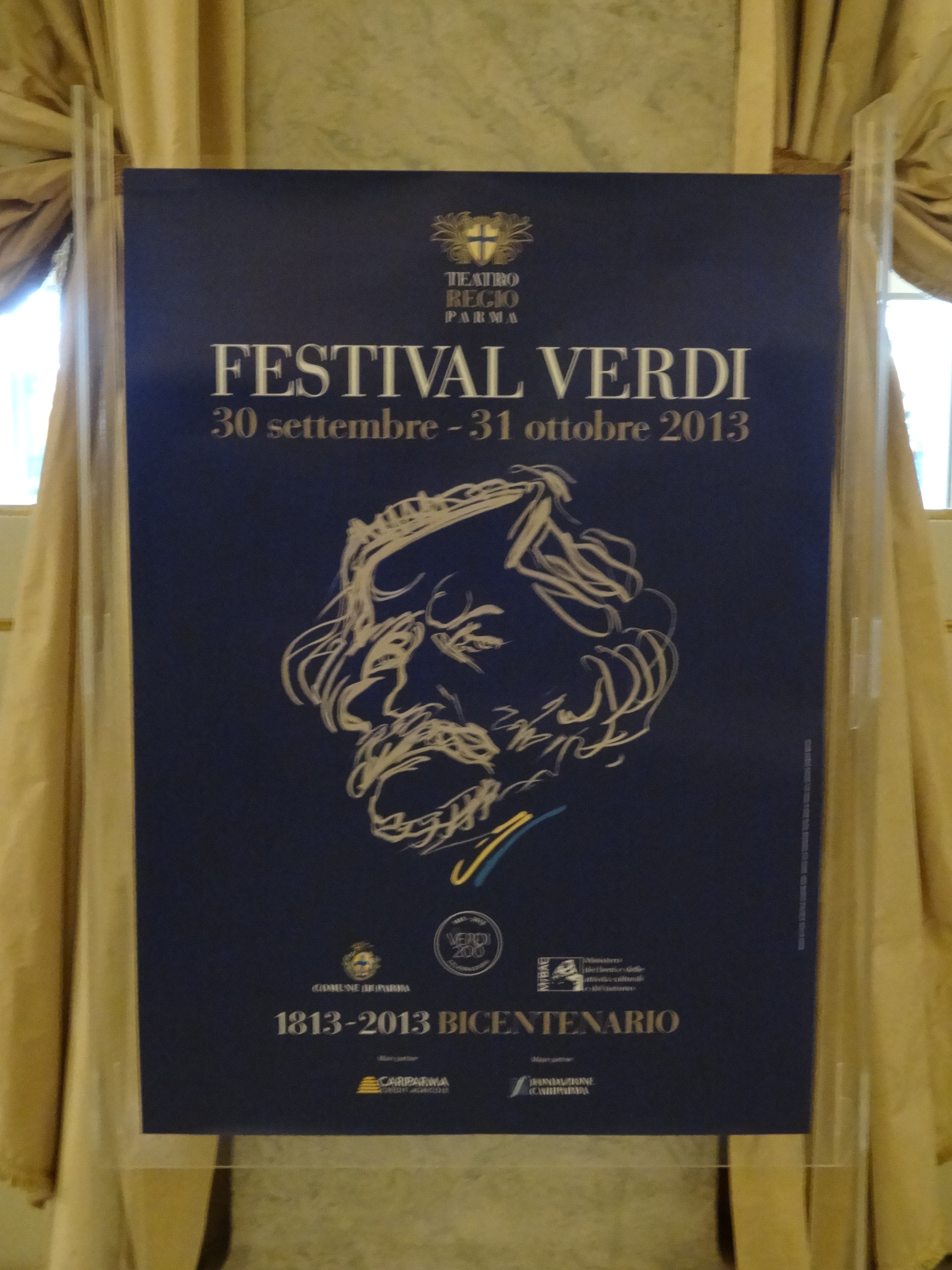
Poster for the 2013 Festival Verdi in the foyer of the Teatro Regio, October 2013

The "bicententario" year of 2013 prompted special celebrations which included concerts by the La Scala Orchestra, under Riccardo Chailly, and the Orchestre National de France under Daniele Gatti (which also gave the Requiem). Providing insights into working with the Teatro and with Verdi's music were singers Carlo Bergonzi, Mirella Freni, and Raina Kabaivanska as well as conductor Bruno Bartoletti. A concert by the Filarmonica Arturo Toscanini on 10 October was something of a highlight of the celebrations. It included a concert version of act 2 of Aida. Other complete operas given during the month included I masnadieri, Falstaff, and Simon Boccanegra.

Festival Verdi

In addition to its regular season, from the 1990s the company began to mount a Festival Verdi. Beginning in 2003, the celebration known as Buon Compleanno Maestro Verdi ("Happy Birthday, Maestro Verdi") has been held each 10 October with a concert of excerpts from his works and this is coupled with the month-long festival.

Along with the Verdi operas presented as part of its regular season since 2003/04, the aim of the Festival Verdi has been to present every one of the composer's operas by the bi-centennial year of 2013. However, while this was not achieved, very few operas remain to be staged (depending upon whether different versions are planned). The Festival has included associated discussions, orchestral concerts, and other relevant presentations.

== The Teatro Regio's audience ==
Several writers have commented on the particular qualities of certain members of the audience when attending a performance at the Ducale and the Regio: "Parma's operatic public has a reputation as particularly demanding [and] famous for being unforgiving of any singer not in good voice" notes Plantamura, while Lynn goes back to the early days of the old Ducale in 1816 with an account of the way the tenor Alberico Curioni was "whistled and booed, but he would have none of it and shouted obscenities back" until the police were called and arrested him. The inaugural gala of the Teatro Regio on 16 May 1829 "was not a joyous occasion" for the audience, which gave Bellini's Zaira "a frosty reception" due to the fact that he was the second choice and that he had refused to use a libretto written by one of the company's board members.

Lynn also recounts several incidents during performances in the 19th century where the curtain was brought down due to vociferous protests from audience members, one event actually leading to the dismissal of the theatre's administration. A 21st century performance, which incited audience displeasure was the 2001 opening of a controversial production of Verdi's Macbeth, which was set during the First World War. A later performance caused competing "bravas" and booing for and against the Lady Macbeth. The theatre's administration explained it as follows: "Teatro Regio realizes that it needs to be the best because the audience are all experts".

== Some artists who have worked at the Teatro Regio di Parma ==
The dates of their most recent appearances have been noted below.

Conductors
Bruno Bartoletti (2009)	Myung-Whun Chung (2005)	Lorin Maazel (2009)
Zubin Mehta	Riccardo Muti (2007)	Daniel Oren (2012)
Renato Palumbo (2013)	Georges Prêtre (2007)	Yuri Temirkanov (2013)
Opera singers
Marcelo Álvarez (2009)	Daniela Barcellona (2009)	Carlo Bergonzi (1959)
Sesto Bruscantini	Renato Bruson (2008)	Maria Callas (1951)
Piero Cappuccilli	José Carreras (1998)	Boris Christoff
Franco Corelli	Mario Del Monaco	Daniela Dessì (2005)
Barbara Frittoli (2007)	Sonia Ganassi (2011)	Carlo Guelfi (2011)
Nicolai Ghiaurov	Alfredo Kraus (1987)	Flaviano Labò (1960s)
Ambrogio Maestri (2011)	Anthony Michaels-Moore (2008)	Leo Nucci (2012)
Michele Pertusi (2013)	Juan Pons (2005)	Katia Ricciarelli (1986)
Margherita Rinaldi (1970)	Piero Sardelli (1946)	Renata Scotto
Cesare Siepi (1982)	Renata Tebaldi (1949)	Richard Tucker (1971)

== In popular culture ==
The Teatro Regio was featured in scenes in Bernardo Bertolucci's 1964 film Before the Revolution, as well as the 1987 Italian horror film Opera, directed by Dario Argento.
