= San Paolo, Parma =

Former convent in central Parma

Coordinates: 44°48′17.19″N 10°19′44.26″E

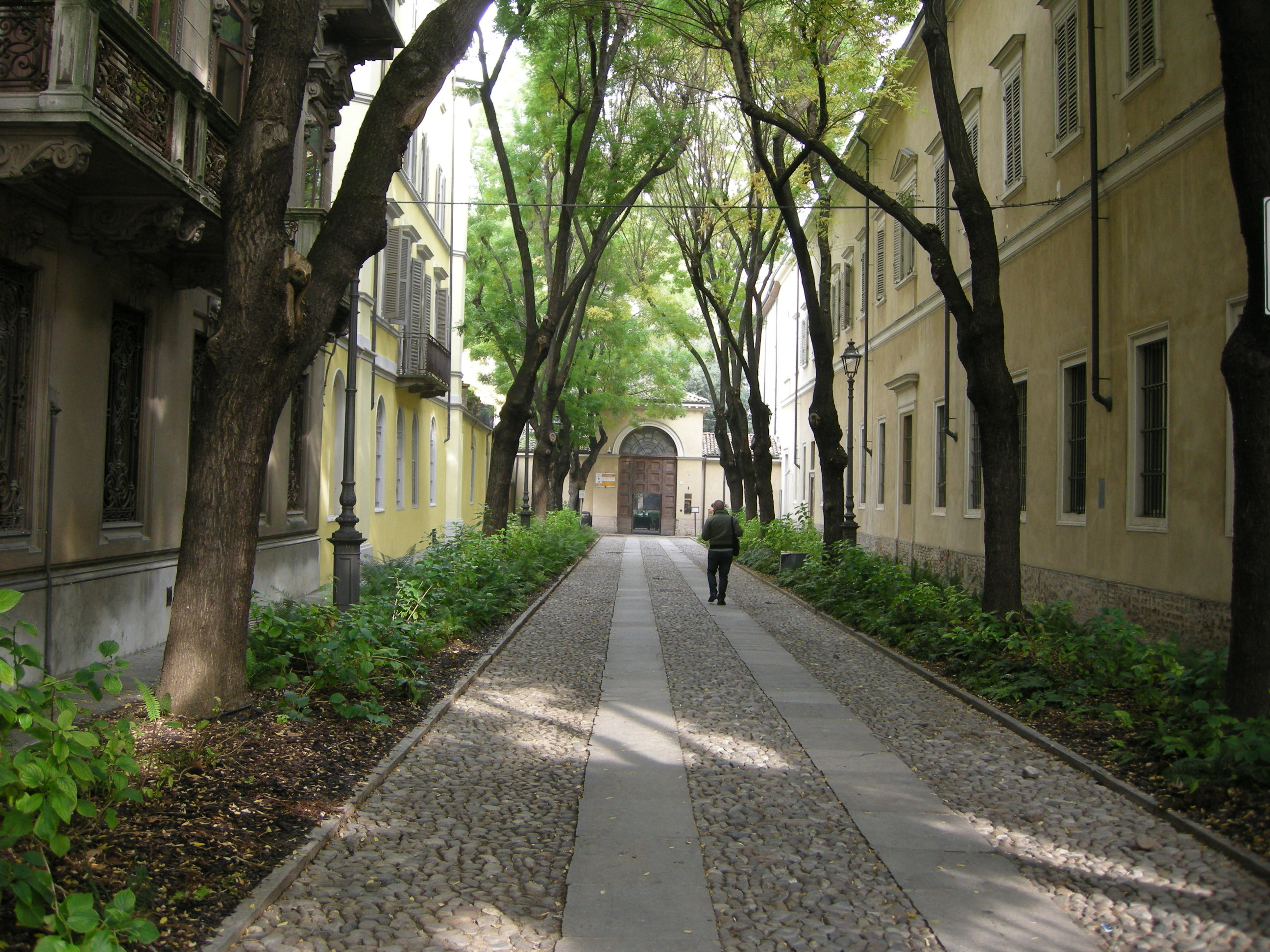
Entrance to the monastery.

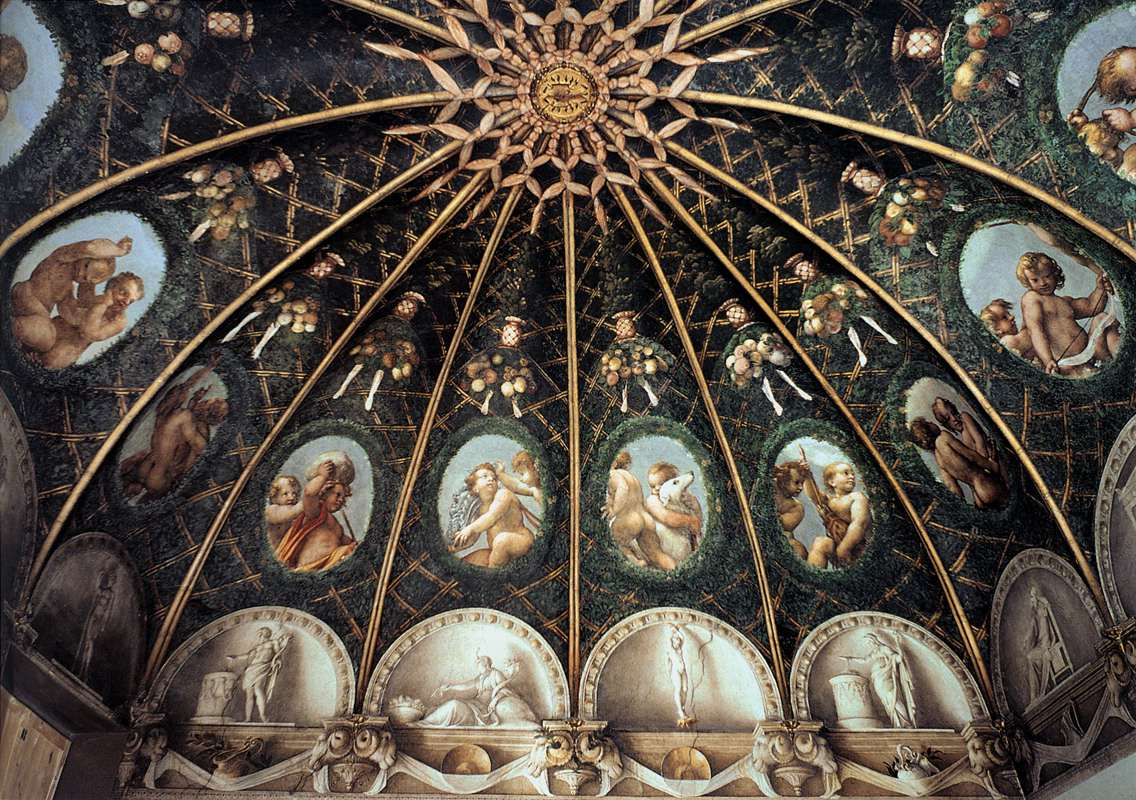
Frescoes in the Camera di San Paolo.

San Paolo is a former convent in central Parma, Emilia-Romagna, northern Italy. It is best known for housing the Camera di San Paolo (Chamber of St Paul), decorated by a masterpiece of fresco work (1519) by Correggio.

== History ==
Tradition holds that the monastery was erected on the spot where Godescalco, the son-in-law of the Lombard king Agilulf, converted to Christianity and took the name Paolo. Supposedly he endowed the convent after his young wife had died during childbirth between 599 and 602.

However, documents speak of a Benedictine convent, one of nearly a handful in Parma, present around the year 1000, and it was adjacent to the former and contemporary church of San Ludovico, now also deconsecrated.

The convent mainly admitted women from aristocratic or wealthy lineage. It was to this monastery that Margherita Farnese (1567–1643), daughter of the Duke of Parma and great-granddaughter of Charles V, Holy Roman Emperor, was admitted after the failure and annulment (1583) of her marriage (1581) with Vincenzo II Gonzaga, the heir to the Duchy of Mantua.

By 1767, the monastery only held about eighty nuns or candidates, after the arrival of Napoleonic rule in 1810, the monastery was suppressed. The convent came into the management of the comune.

== Camera di San Paolo (Chamber of St Paul) ==
In February to September 1519, Correggio was commissioned by the Abbess Giovanna Piacenza to decorate the domed ceiling of her private room, now called the Camera di San Paolo or Camera della Badessa. He painted between the ribs to simulate a pergola, pierced by ovals (small windows) with smiling puttoes and hunting representations. Below the oculi are lunettes with monochromic scenes painted to simulate marble. The fireplace is frescoed with a depiction of the goddess Diana.

Apart from its mastery of style and "delightful vivacity", the Correggio frescoes have spurred a debate as to the underlying significance of the iconography, in part debating the significance of pagan and hunting scenes for a nunnery. The convent was known for the laxity of its rules, and had been embroiled, along with the abbess in various local land disputes. Critics including Roberto Longhi and Erwin Panofsky have dedicated monographs to the subject.

The private room of the abbess was frescoed (1514) by Alessandro Araldi with grotteschi. The monastery contains a chapel of Santa Caterina d'Alessandria frescoed with scenes of her life also by Araldi. The rooms are open to the public as a museum.

== Pinacoteca Stuard ==
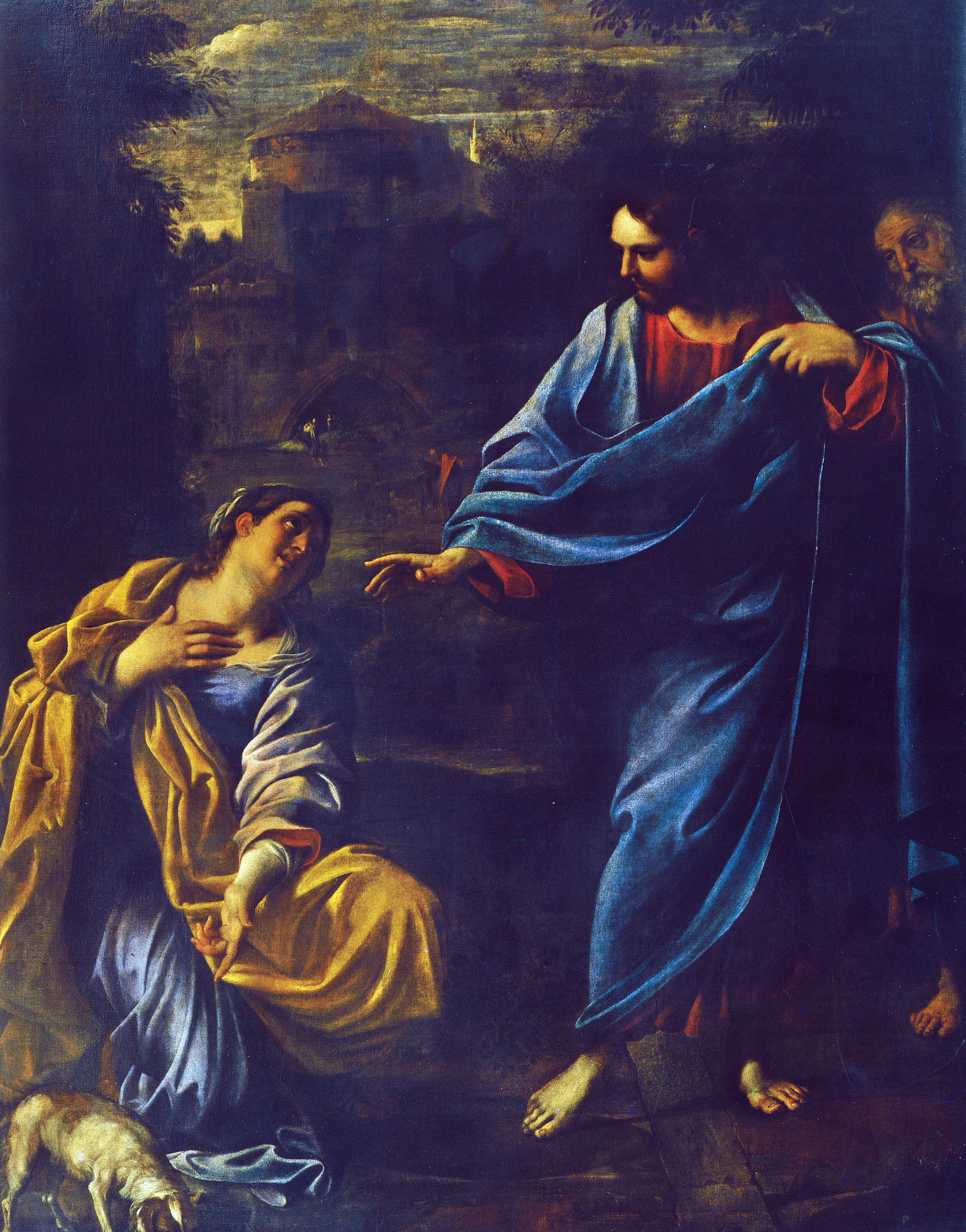
Christ and the Canaanite Woman (1595) by Caracci

In 2002, a wing of the monastery was converted into the Pinacoteca Stuard. This eclectic collection was left to the Congregation of Charity by Giuseppe Stuard (Parma, 1790–1834), administrator of the Congregation of San Filippo Neri and wealthy collector.

Since 2016, the collection includes works formerly in the Palazzo del Comune, including the Christ and the Canaanite Woman by Agostino Carracci, a Landscape with knights by Ilario Spolverini, St John the evangelist painted by Giovanni Riccò, and paintings by Amedeo Bocchi.

The first hall of the second floor has a number of 18th century works by artists who trained in Parma such as Enrico Bandini, Giovan Battista Borghesi, Guido e Giulio Carmignani, Alberto Pasini, Claudio Alessandri, Luigi Marchesi, Enrico Sartori, Deogratias Lasagna, Carlo Rimondi, Daniele De Strobel, Giorgio Scherer, Enrico Barbieri, Cecrope Barilli; and Amedeo Bocchi (including his paintings of Exodus and Lotus Flower).

Over three hundred paintings from the 14th-century to the 18th century is displayed in various rooms. It includes works by Bernardo Daddi; Paolo di Giovanni Fei; Maestro della Misericordia; Bicci di Lorenzo; Niccolò di Tommaso; and schools of Pietro di Giovanni di Ambrogio, Paolo Uccello, Filippino Lippi, and Parmigianino. Later works were by Sebastiano Ricci, Bartolomeo Schedoni, Guercino, Guido Reni, Giovanni Lanfranco, Bernardo Bellotto, Lodewijk Toeput called Pozzoserrato,Anthony Mor, Felice Boselli, and Giovanni Gaibazzi. The city has included archeologic items in the museum.
