= Renato Brozzi =

Italian painter

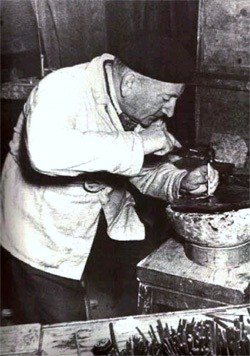

Renato Brozzi (1887–1963) was an Italian sculptor, mainly in bronze, as well as sculptor. One of his favorite subjects were animals.

== Biography ==
Born in the town of Traversetolo near Parma, and trained with Daniele De Strobel and Cecrope Barilli at the painting course of the Academy of Fine Arts of Parma. There he met lifelong friend Amedeo Bocchi, alongside whom the sculptor worked for some years in Rome at the Villa Strohl Fern. In 1919, he became a close friend of Gabriele D'Annunzio, and maintained a long correspondence with the poet.

Brozzi made works for the poet Gargnasco Gardone's house, and designed sports trophies. The commune of Traversetolo has established a museum dedicated to the artist and his life. He sculpted some of the reliefs for the Monument to the Fallen, Parma.
