= Domenico Muzzi =

Italian painter (1742–1812)

Domenico Muzzi (1742 – 1812) was an Italian painter and professor of Design at the Accademia di Belle Arti of Parma.

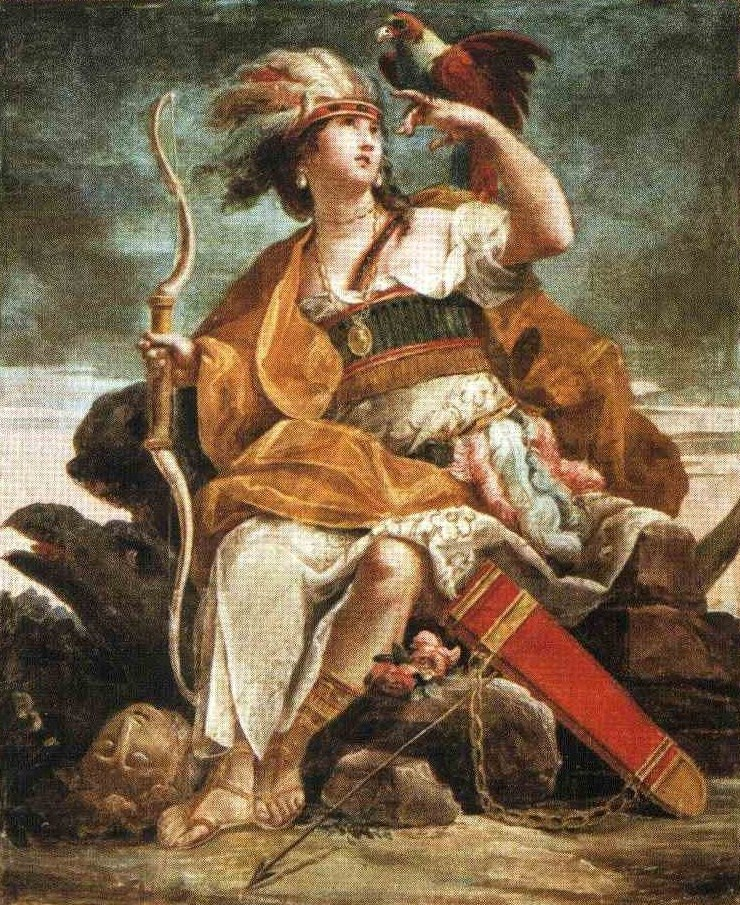
Allegory of America, (circa 1790) fresco by Domenico Muzzi in Palazzo Sanvitale, Parma.

He trained in Parma at the Academy under Giuseppe Peroni. He painted frescoes for the Palazzo Sanvitale, Parma and the cupola of the church of San Liborio at Colorno.

Among his pupils were Antonio Pasini. and Michele Plancher.
