= Monument to the Fallen, Parma =

Coordinates: 44°48′15″N 10°19′45″E

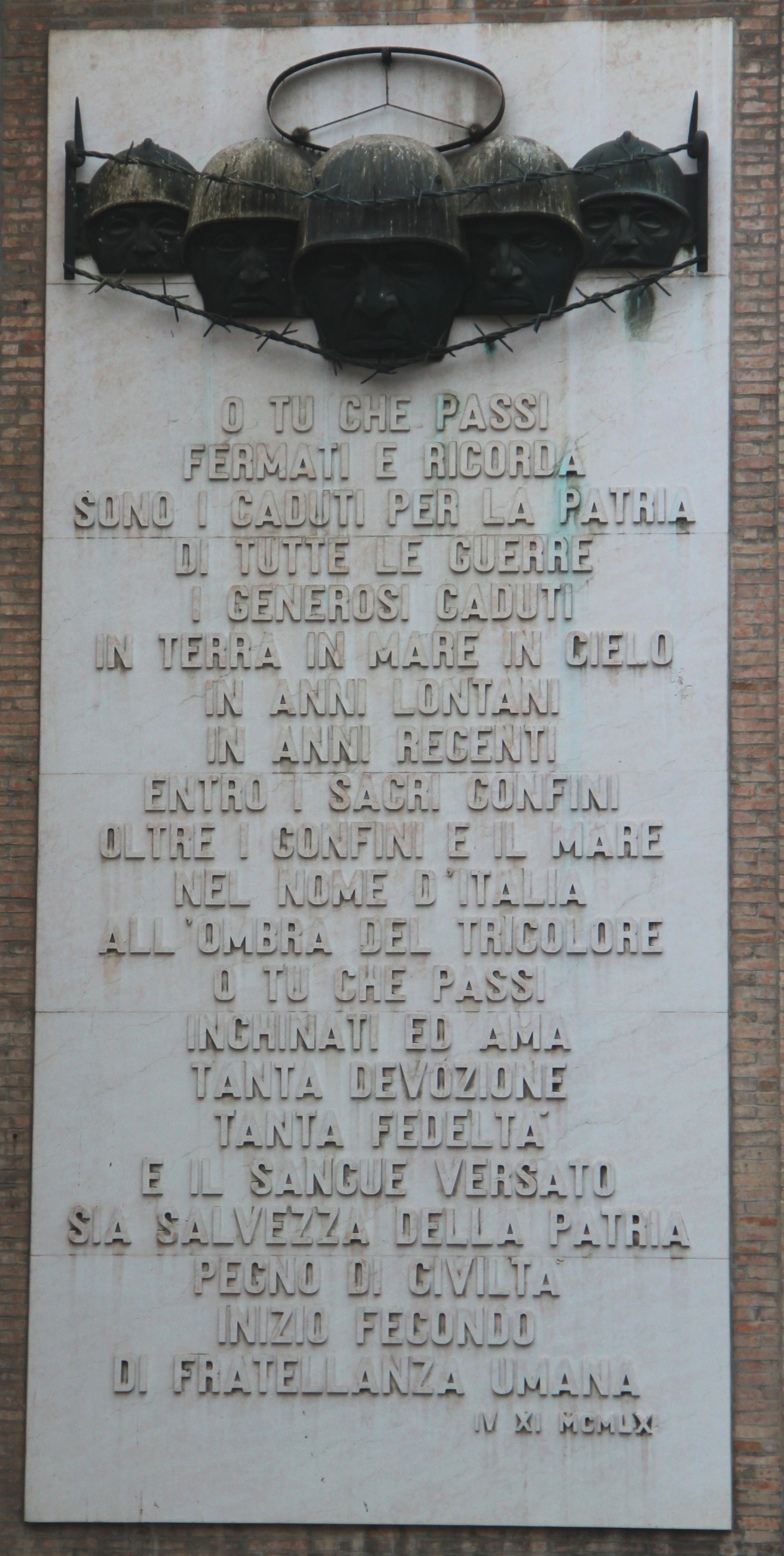

The Monument to the Fallen (Italian: Monumento ai caduti) consists of sculptures, reliefs and a plaque affixed in the 1960s to the 18th-century bell-tower (Torre di San Paolo) built attached to the now deconsecrated church of San Ludovico (previously dedicated to San Paolo and serving the adjacent Convent of that name. The bell tower is found at the intersection of Strada Macedonio Melloni, Borgo del Parmigianino, and Strada Cavour in central Parma, Italy.

== History and description ==
=== Bell-tower ===
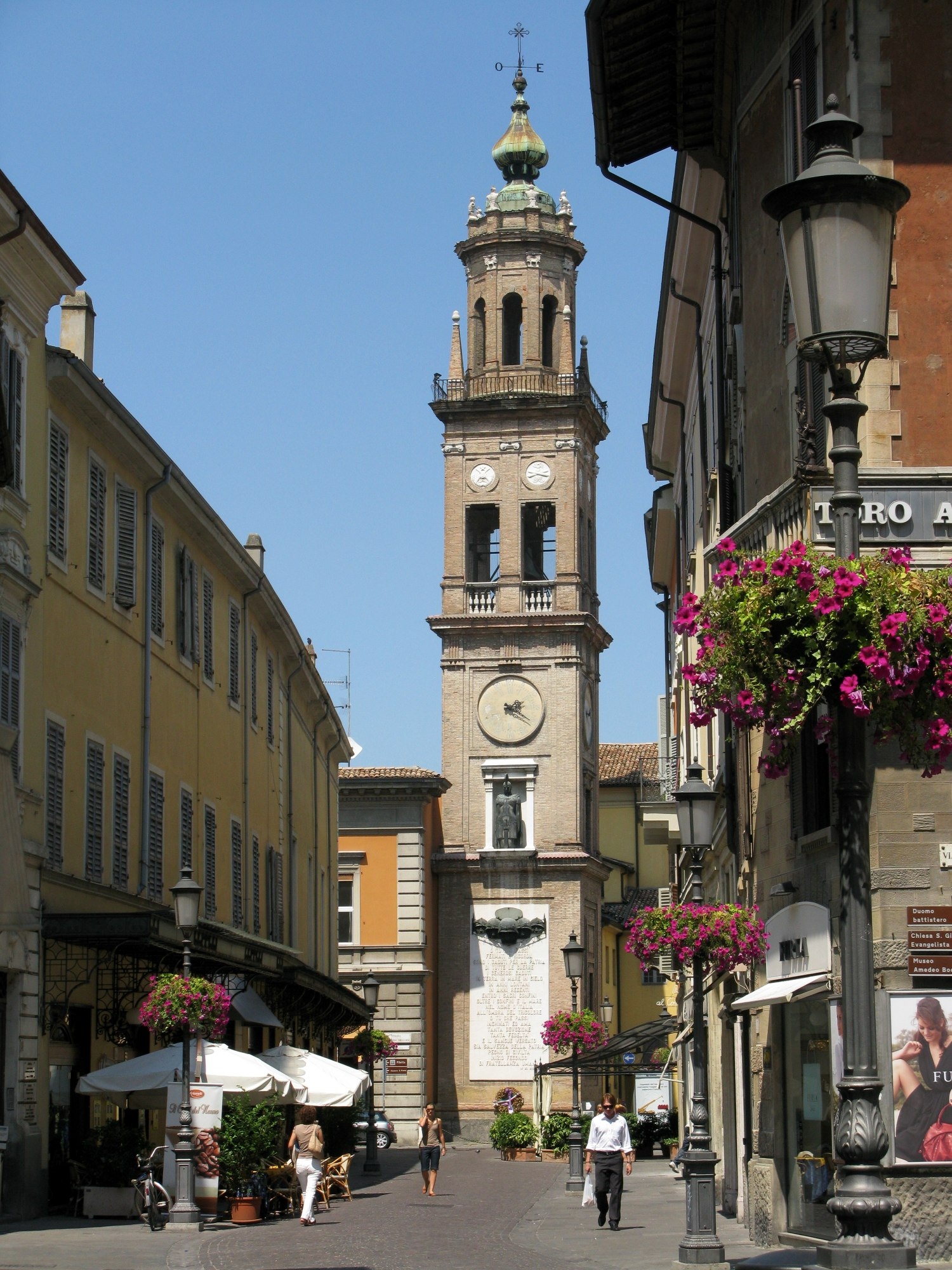

The adjacent church had been rebuilt in a late-Renaissance style from 1584 to 1604, but the Baroque renovation of the bell-tower was not started until 1690 with designs by Domenico Valmagini. Restoration took decades to complete.

=== Monument ===
In 1961, the Monument to those fallen in all wars (Monumento dedicato ai caduti di tutte le guerre) was installed on the side of the tower facing via Cavour. It is notable that the monument did not honor those of any specific war, although the bronze relief with the grim visages of five soldiers, framed by barbed wire, recalls soldiers of the wars in the first half of the twentieth century. The design was by the architect Mario Monguidi with the sculptures by Renato Brozzi and Luigi Froni. In a niche above the soldiers is a bronze kneeling figure in Ancient Roman battle uniform, representing the Italian lineage, with arms hanging straight down at sides, with a sword draped in front of his groin. In 1961, the plaque was inaugurated by the Italian president Giovanni Gronchi. It reads in the verses by Parmesan poet Jacopo Bocchialini (1878–1965); (in all capital letters and in a Sans-serif script, which recalls the script used by the fascists):

O tu che passi / fermati e ricorda / sono i caduti per la patria / di tutte le guerre / i generosi caduti / in terra in mare in cielo / in anni lontani / in anni recenti / entro i sacri confini / ultre i confini e il mare / nel nome d'italia / all'umbra del tricolore / o tu che passi / inchinati ed ama / tanta devozione / tanta fedelita / e il sangu versato / sia salvezz della patria / pegno di civilta / inizio fecondo / di fratellanza umana / 1961

("O you who pass by / stop and remember / they are those who died for their country / of all wars / the generous fallen / on land in sea in sky / in distant years / in recent years / within the sacred boundaries / beyond the borders and the sea / in the name of Italy / in the shadow of the tricolor / O you who pass by / bow down and love / so much devotion / so much loyalty / and blood shed / may it be the salvation of the country / pledge of civility / fruitful start / of human brotherhood / 1961")

The monument is the site for wreath-laying on 4 November, the day memorializing the Italian armed forces: Giornata dell’Unità Nazionale e delle Forze Armate.
