= Alberto Pasini =

Italian painter (1826–1899)

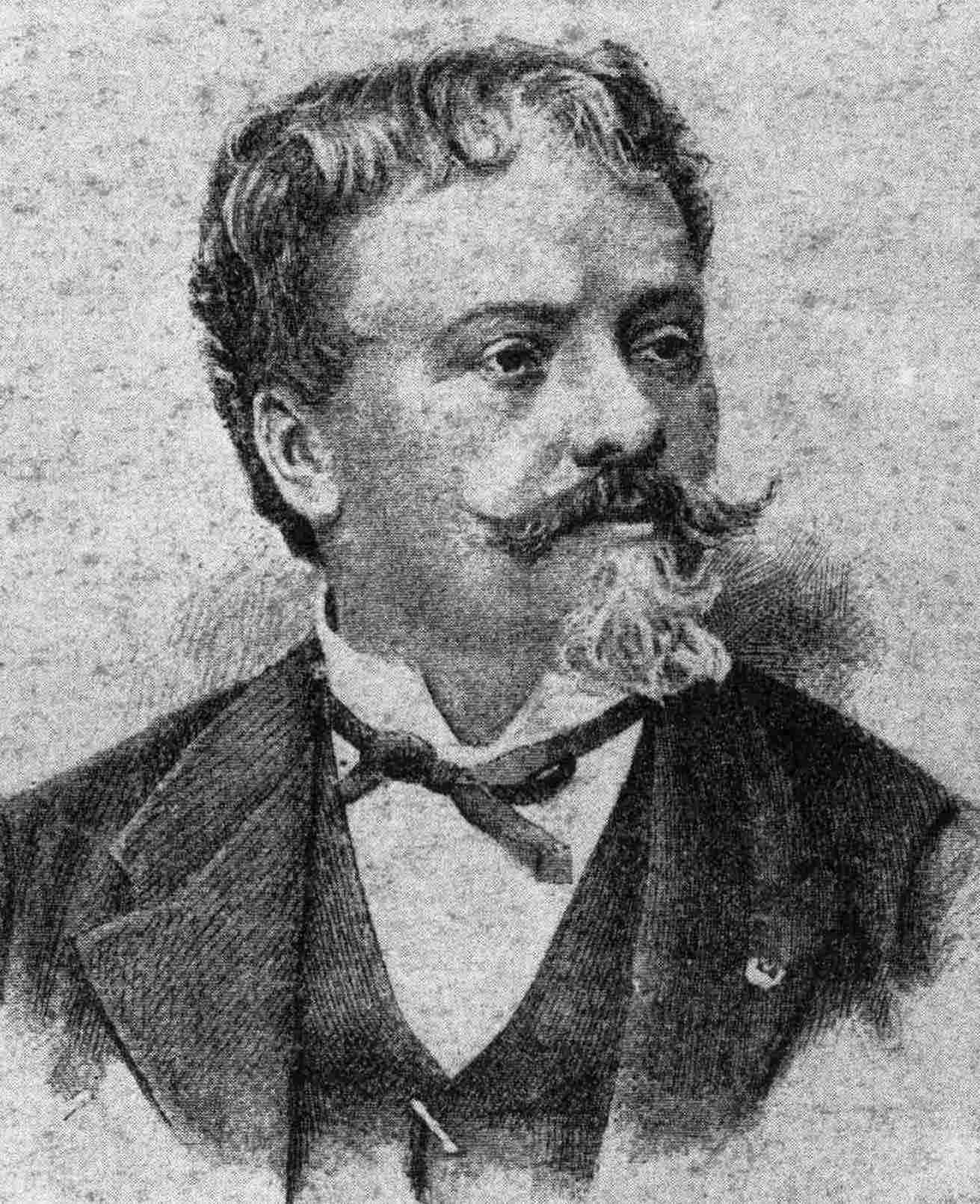
- Portrait circa 1870, from Book "Le strade di Parma", by Tiziano Marcheselli
- Born: 3 September 1826; Busseto, Italy
- Died: 15 December 1899 (aged 73); Cavoretto
- Education: Academy of Fine Art, Parma
- Known for: Painter, lithographer
- Movement: Orientalist

Alberto Pasini (3 September 1826 – 15 December 1899) was an Italian painter. He is best known for depicting Orientalist subjects in a late-Romantic style.

== Biography ==
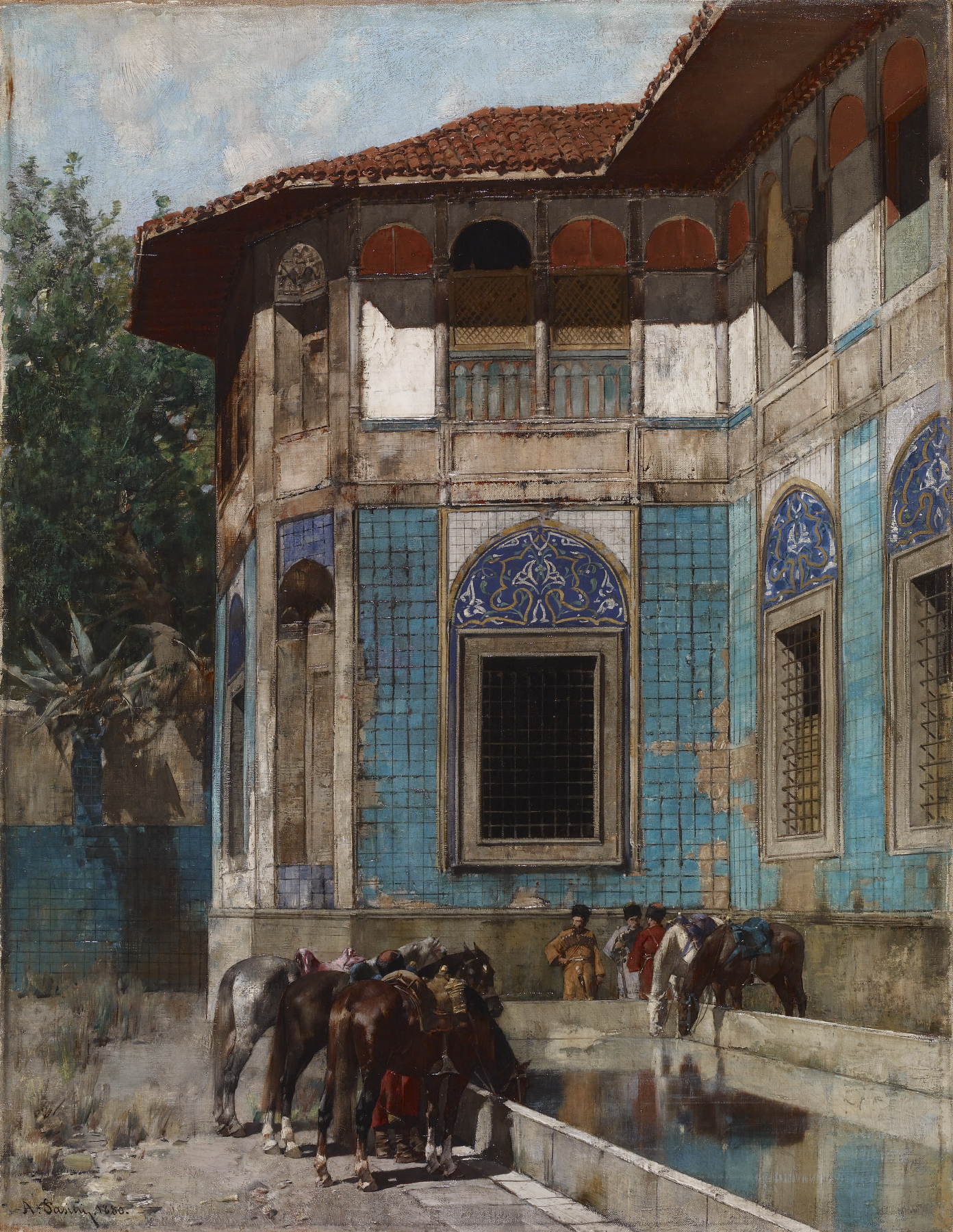
Damascus, 1880

He was born in Busseto. His father was a commissioner for his district, a post analogous to a sub-prefect. After the death of his father in 1828, he and his mother moved to Parma, where Pasini enrolled, at the age of 17 years, in the Academy of Fine Art of Parma. He studied landscape painting and drawing. In Parma, he was helped early on by Alberto's uncle, the painter and manuscript illuminator, Antonio Pasini, who painted for the local nobility and collaborated with the publishing house established by Giovanni Battista Bodoni. By 1852, he exhibited a series of thirty designs, made into lithographs, depicting various castles around Piacenza, Lunigiana and Parma. He was noticed by the artist Paolo Toschi, who encouraged Pasini to travel to Paris, where Pasini first joined the workshop of Pierre-Luc-Charles and Eugène Cicéri, of the Barbizon School.

In 1853 his lithograph of The Evening gained him admittance to the Paris Salon, and to the workshop of the famous Théodore Chassériau. The eruption of the Crimean War offered a new opportunity, when in February 1855, this latter painter recommended Pasini to replace him on the entourage of the French plenipotentiary minister Nicolas Prosper Bourée to Persia. Pasini accompanied him, returning through the north of Persia and Armenia before reaching the port of Trebizond. In subsequent trips, he visited Egypt, the Red Sea, Arabia, Istanbul, and Persia. Pasini parlayed his exposures during this trip into numerous highly detailed paintings of orientalist subjects. He left again for Istanbul in October 1867, summoned by the French Ambassador Bourée. He returned to Turkey in 1876 to execute the four paintings commissioned by Sultan Abdul Aziz. He was about to return to Istanbul the next year, when his patron, the Sultan, died.

In 1865, he spent some time in Cannes, painted landscapes of the Riviera. During the Franco-Prussian War of 1870, he returned to Italy, settling in Cavoretto, on the hills around Turin. He continued to travel, closer to his home, with trips to Venice and two sojourns in Spain in 1879 and 1883. He died in Cavoretto on 15 December 1899.

== Works ==
In 1862 at Istanbul, he painted a canvas depicting a Victory by the Turks led by Sultan Abdul Mezid. He exhibited at Paris: The Druze attack a Maronite Village, Falcon hunt in plains of Ispahan, The Bazaar of Istambul, and The stage of the caravan, found in the Museum of Parma. In Venice, and began painting vedute of the city, among other subjects including works depicting the Ponte dei Santi Apostoli, the ferry Cassou and the Rio Marin, Canal Grande; Traghetto San Toma; Venice from the Giudecca; Palazzo Grimani; Rio San Severo, Rio a Santa Maria Formosa; and Palazzi Rezzonico, Foscari e Balbi. He also painted Porta di un bazar; Panorama of the Sierra Nevada; Porta del vino, Alhambra Porta of the sala delle due sorelle; Interno dello moschea dell'Alhambra; Porta d'una moschea, and Palazzo del Generalife; Porta di un vecchio arsenale; Mercato del lunedì nella piazza of the Moschea a Costantinopoli; Cavalli al pascolo in Siria; Cortile di un vecchio joly; La sentinella; Le staffette (Group of irregular cavalry at the door of a mosque in Asia Minor); Courtyard of the Lions in Granada; Gruppo di case nel Rubatto Yesel Giani; Un'arcata of the facciata di San Marco; Porta del Palazzo Moriani; and La Salute. The self-portrait he sent to the Uffizi in Florence is from 1888.

Gubernatis quotes the contemporary art critic, Virgilio Colombo, as saying of his paintings:

Pasini faithfully reproduces the architectural accessories, which sparkle in the sun and bathe in the blue shadows: in this, he is unrivaled and shows extraordinary ingenuity to create huge paintings in small canvases. What skill in painting finger-high figures, fine horses, grim and thoughtful knights, with sumptuous trappings, damask-decorated weapons, kiosks, markets and menageries, saddles encrusted with gems, the turbans, the fabrics, the courtesans of princesses, the military camps, the intimate recesses of the harem, the profiles of city with jagged spires and minarets, and the hunts through the interminable space of the plains. The oriental scenes are exquisitely treated, not by way of searching for the usual sunsets and fiery skies. The atmosphere is fine and transparent and stretches across a silvery coat...all grace and subtlety

== Gallery of Orientalist paintings ==
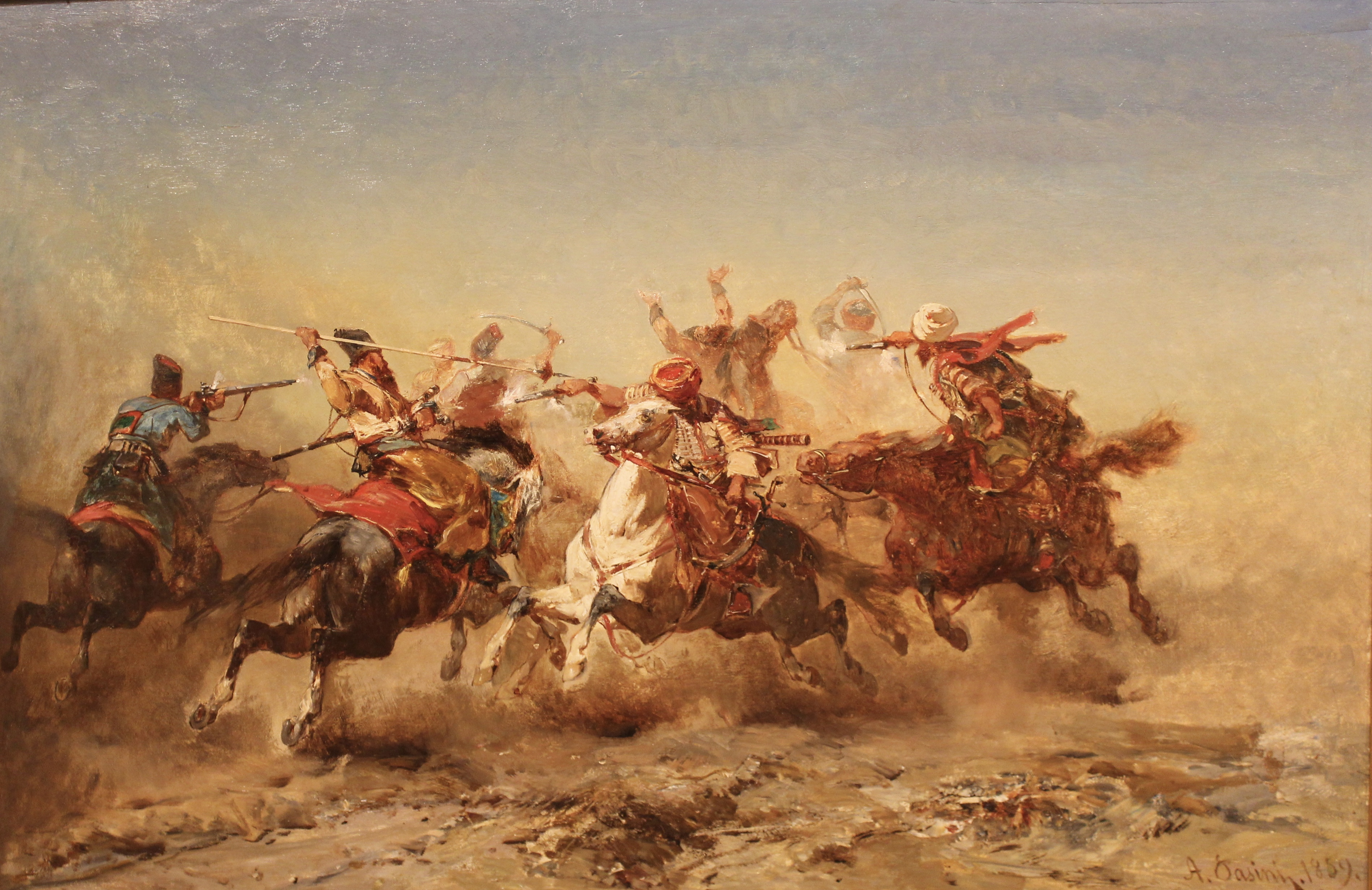
Spirited Conflict, 1859

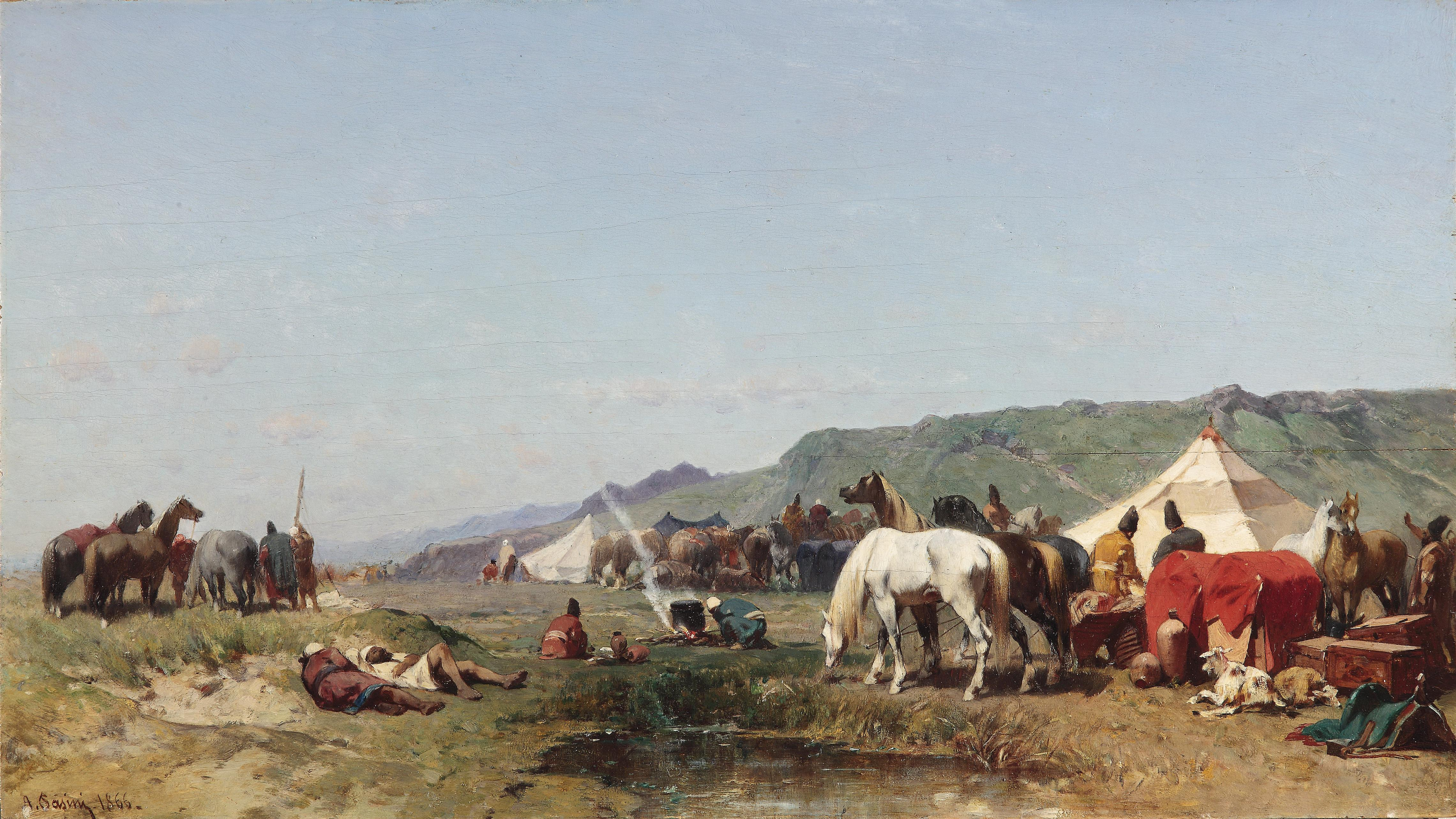
Arab Field Camp, 1866

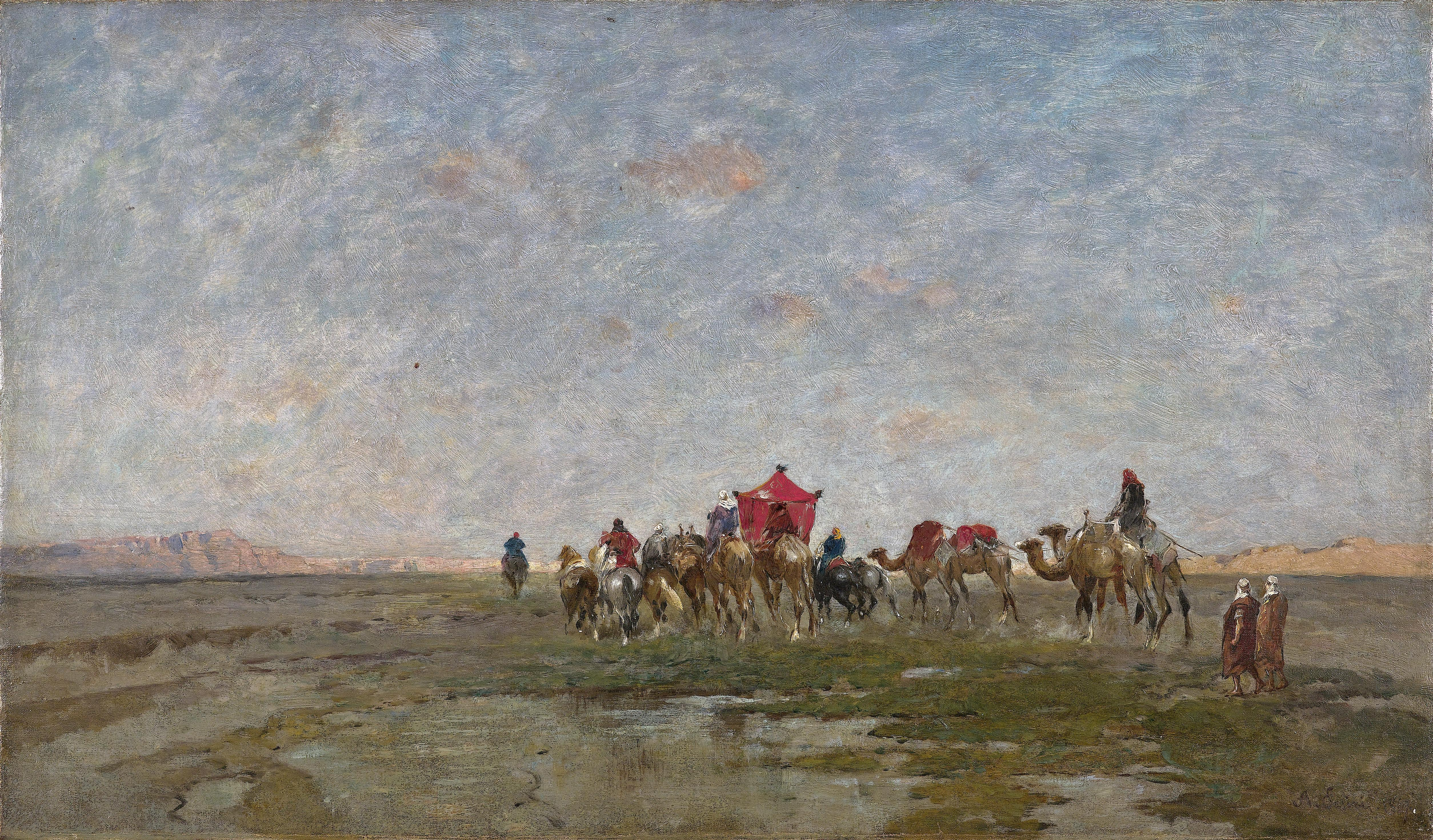
Caravan in the Desert, 1867

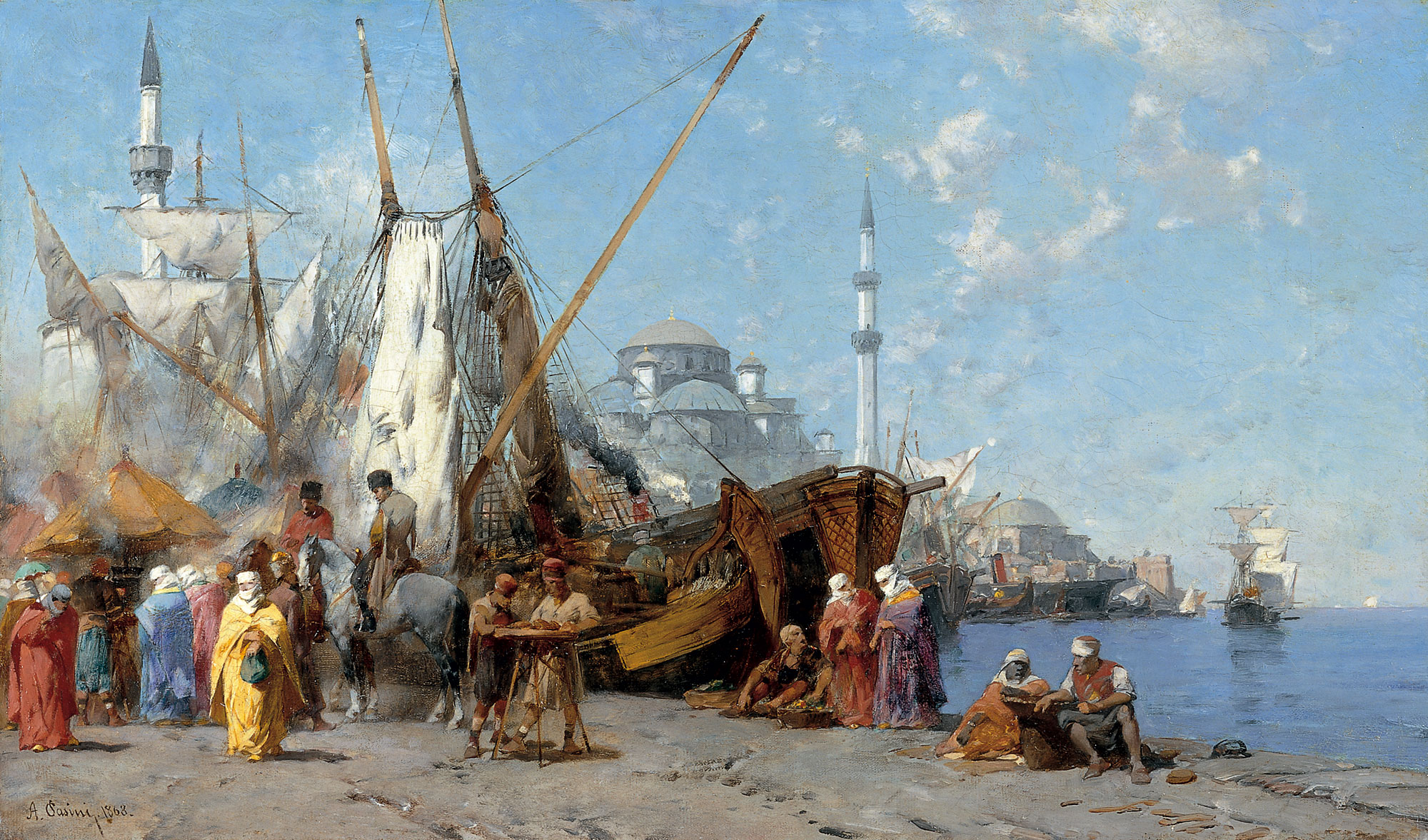
Market in Istanbul, 1868

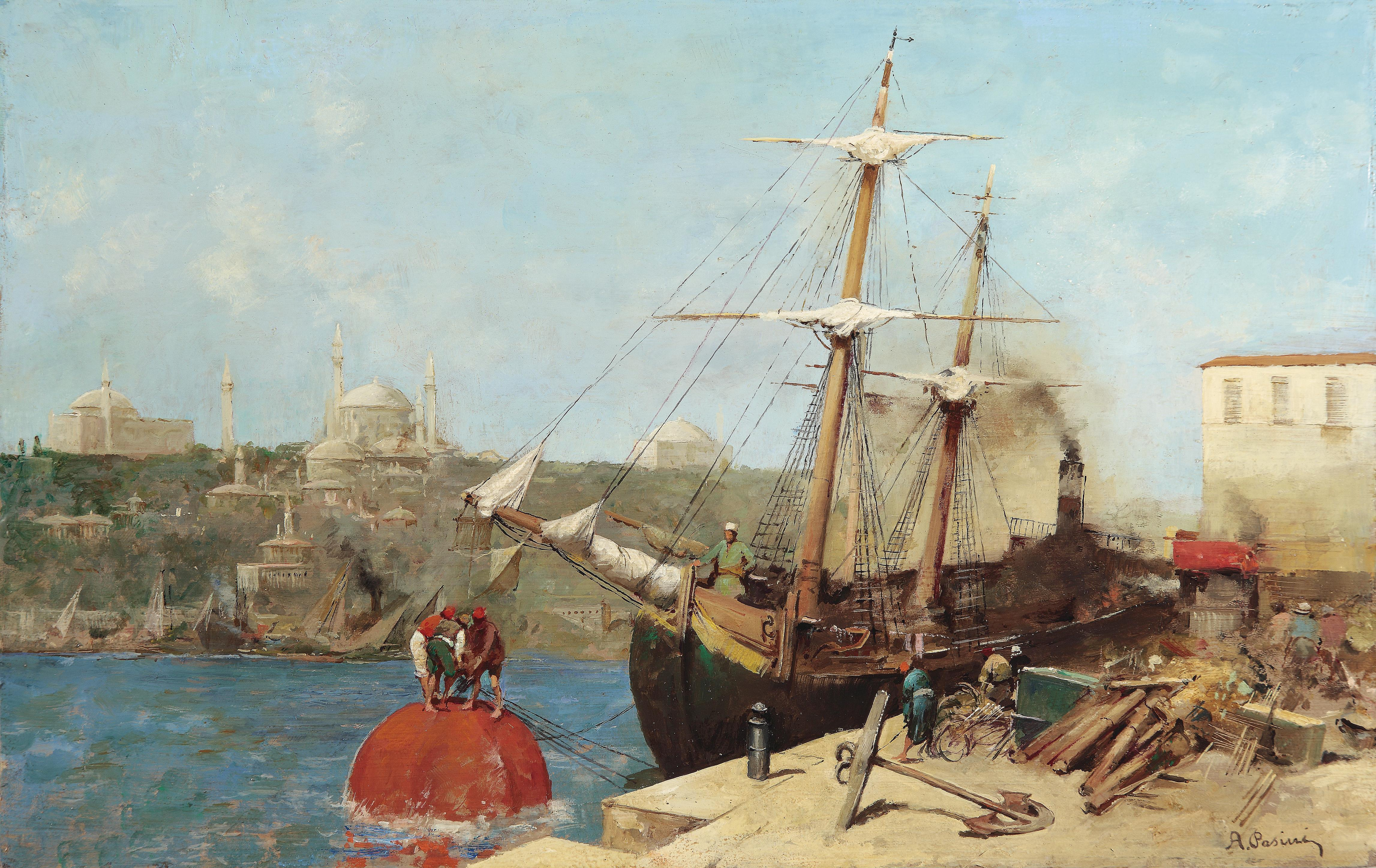
Golden Horn, Istambul, c. 1876

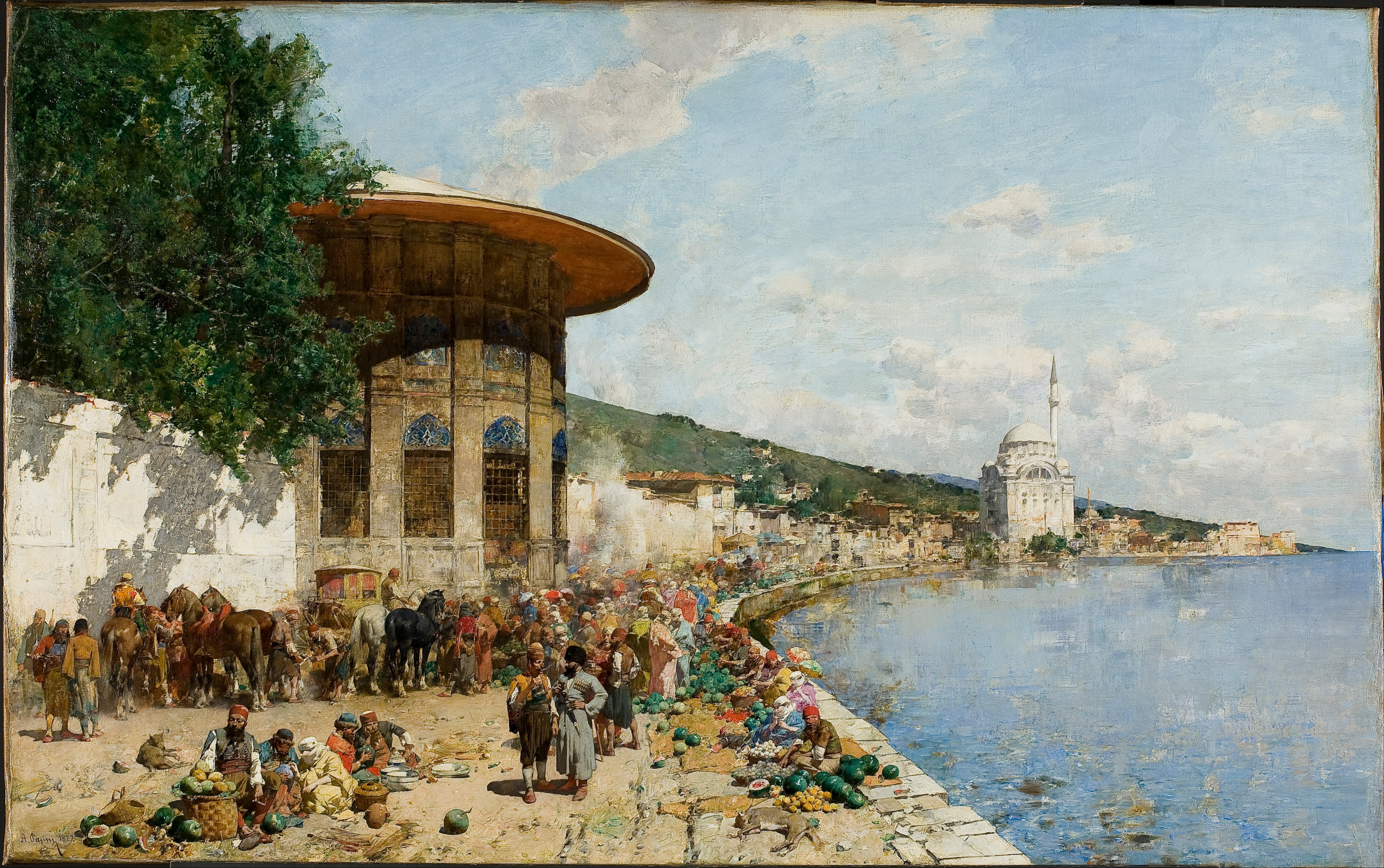
Market Day in Constantinople, 1877

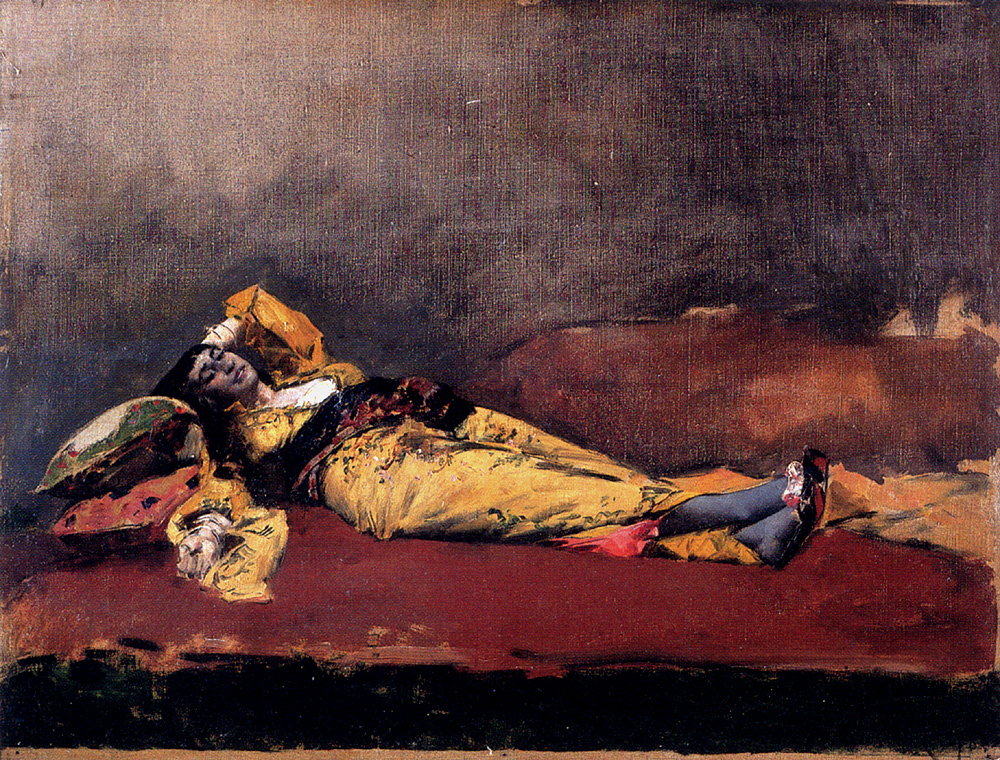
Almea wearing Orange, 1878

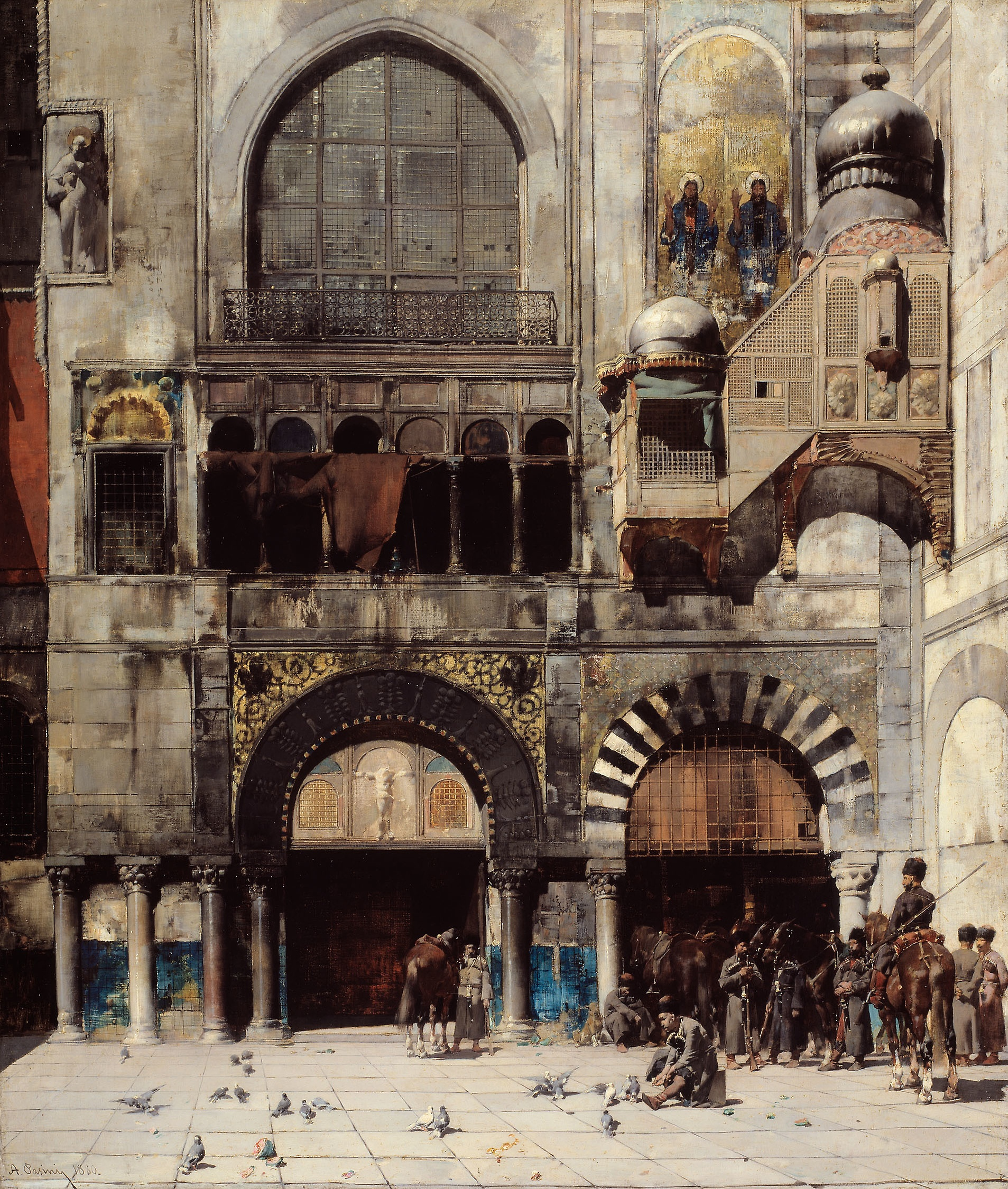
Circassian Cavalry Awaiting their Commanding Officer at the Door of a Byzantine Monument; Memory of the Orient, 1880

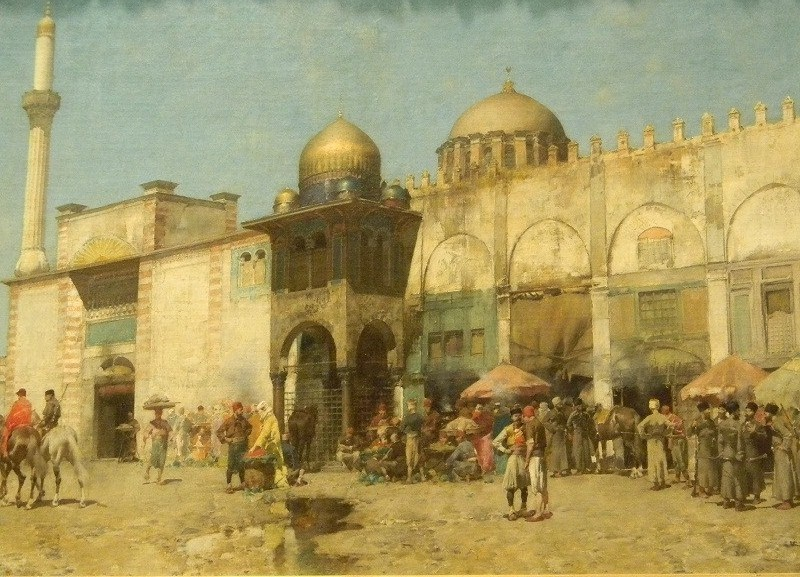
A Mosque, 1886

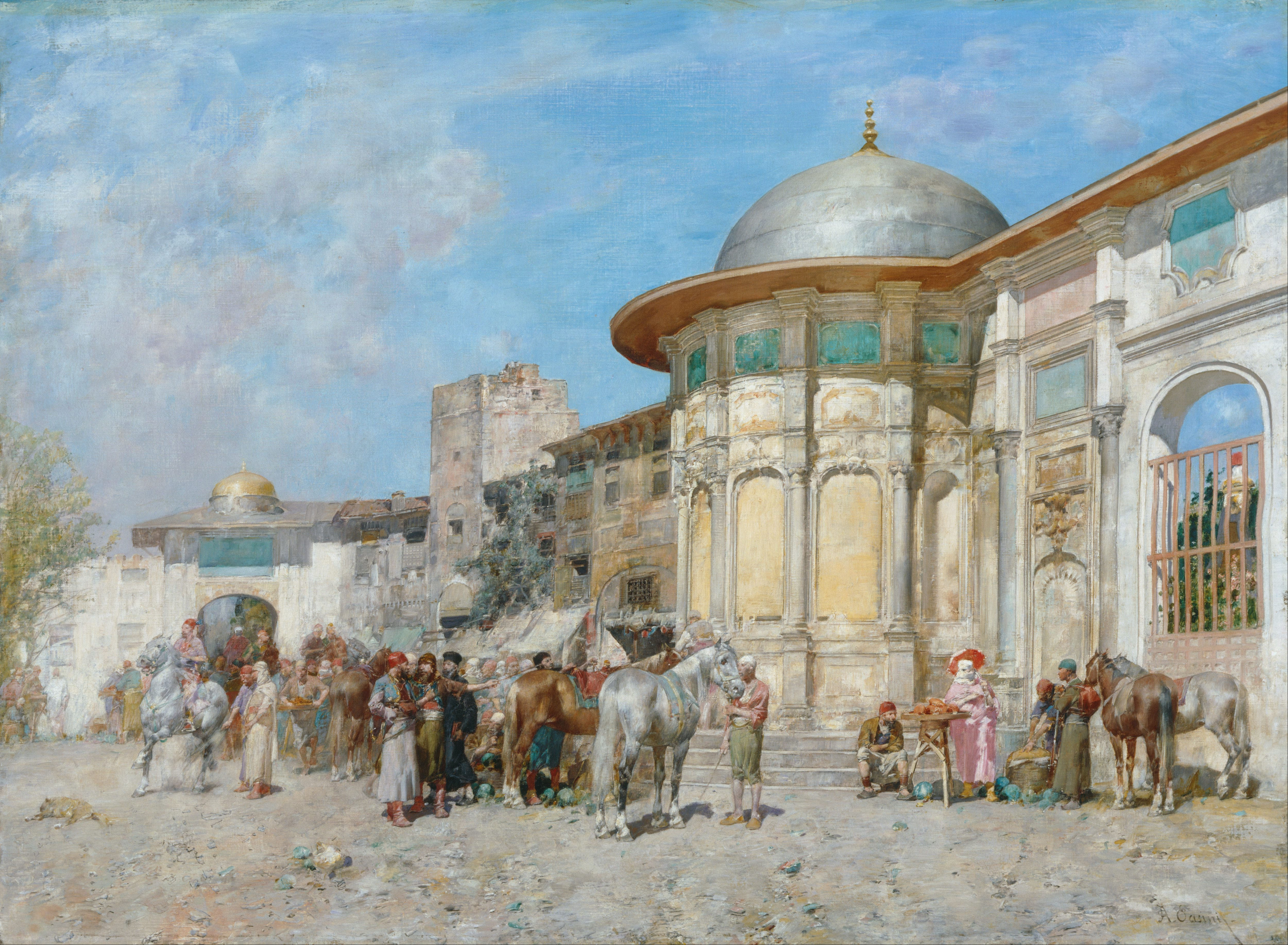
Horse market, Syria

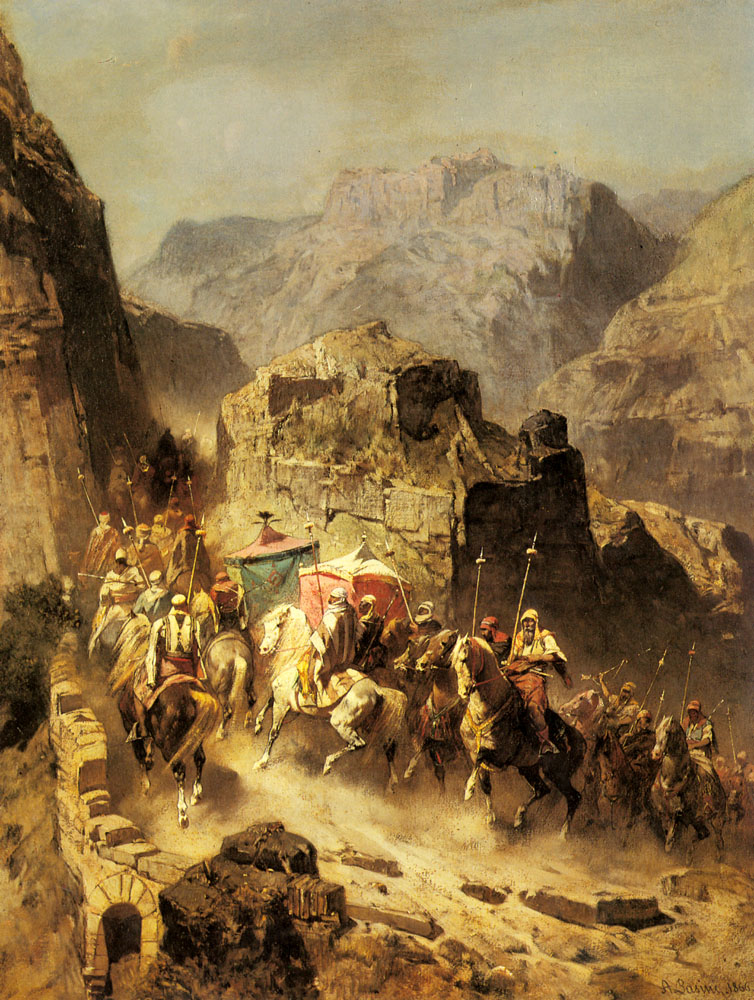
Arab Caravan

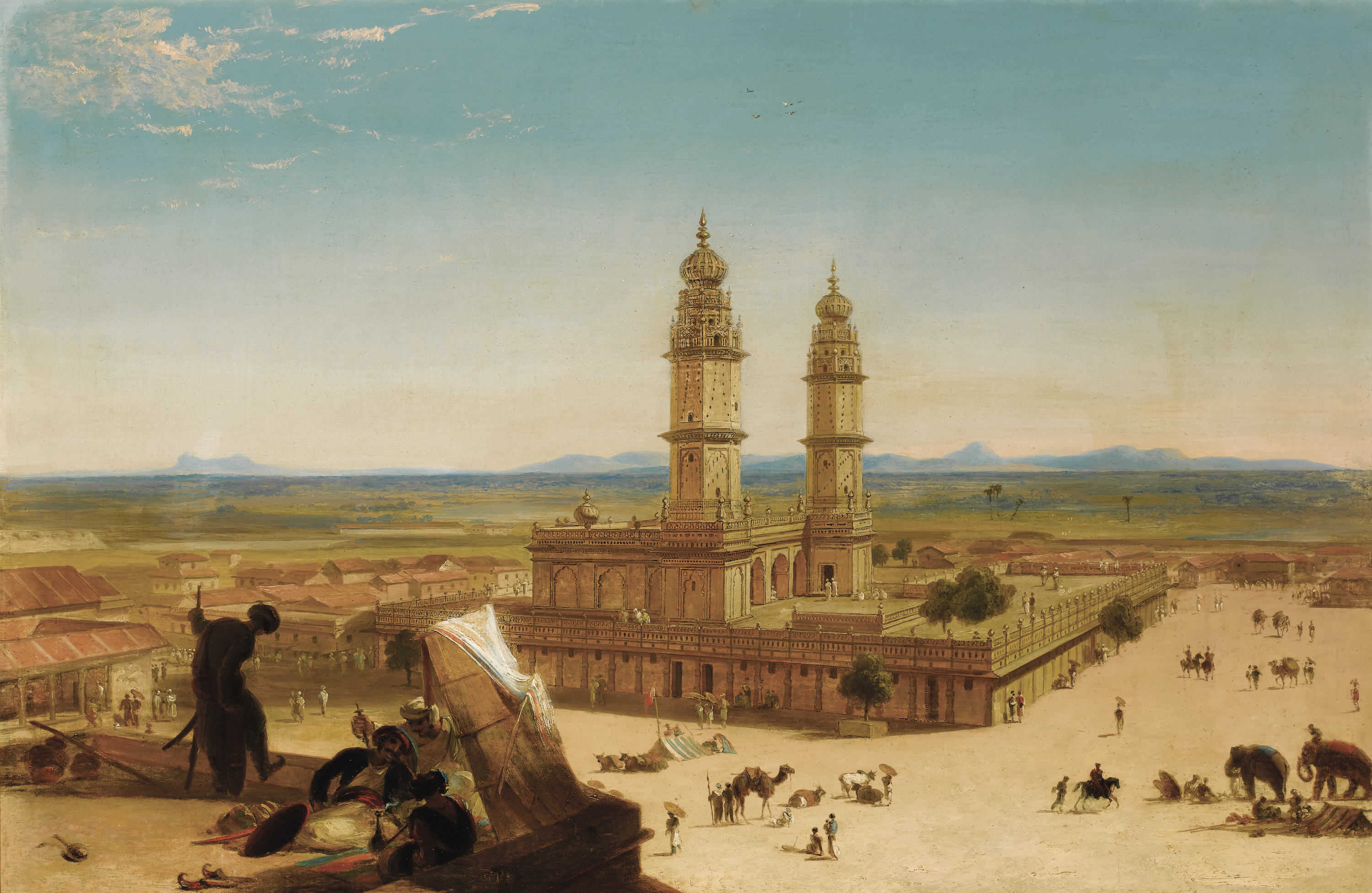
Oriental landscape with Mosque

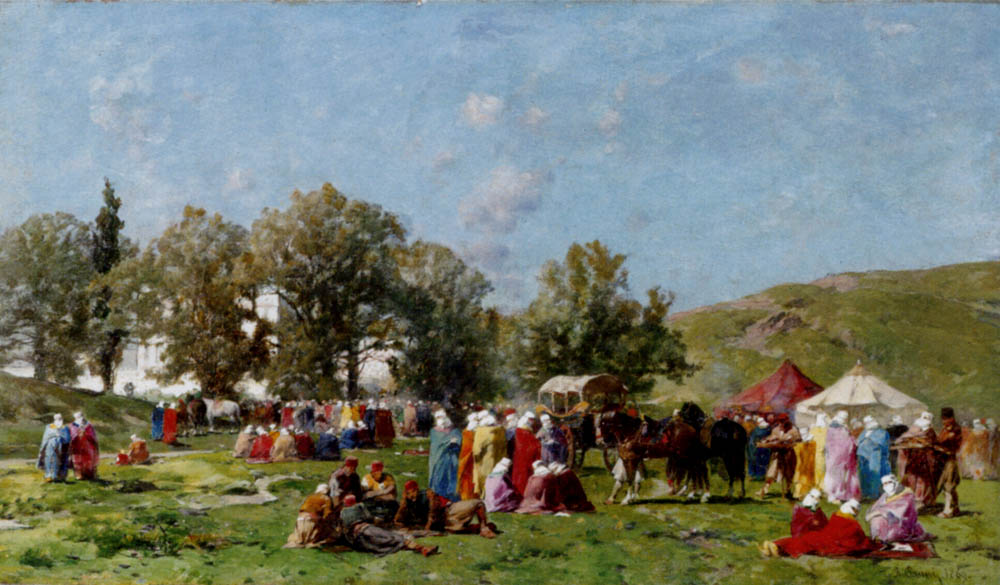
Shores of Bosporus

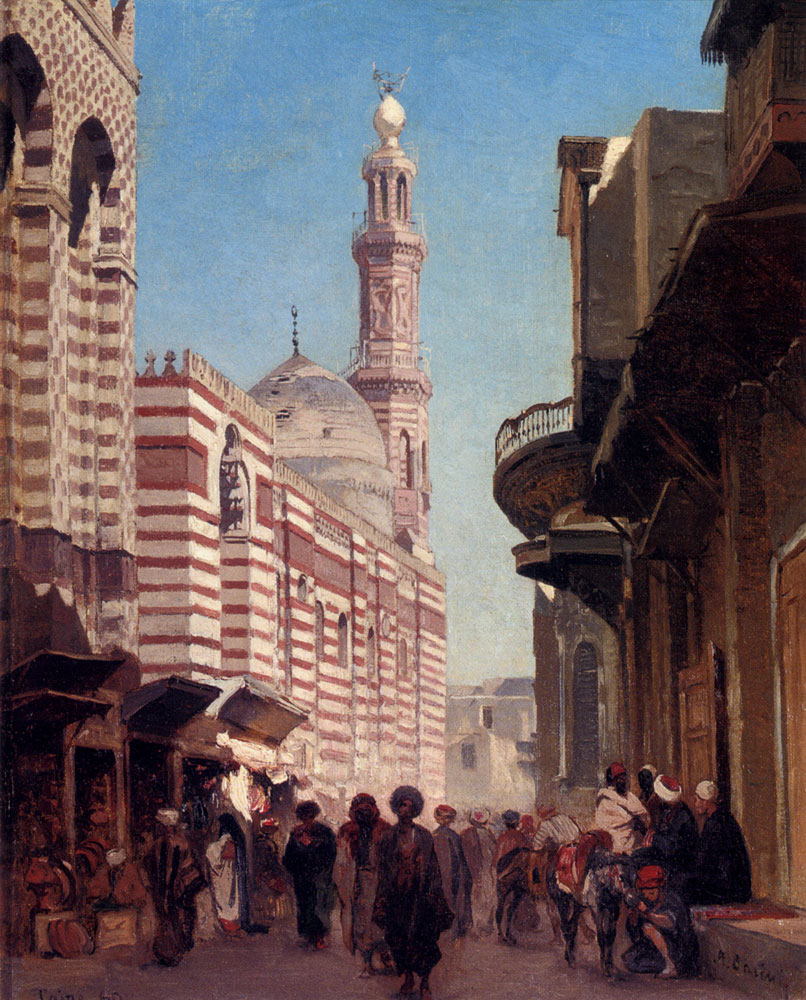
Cairo

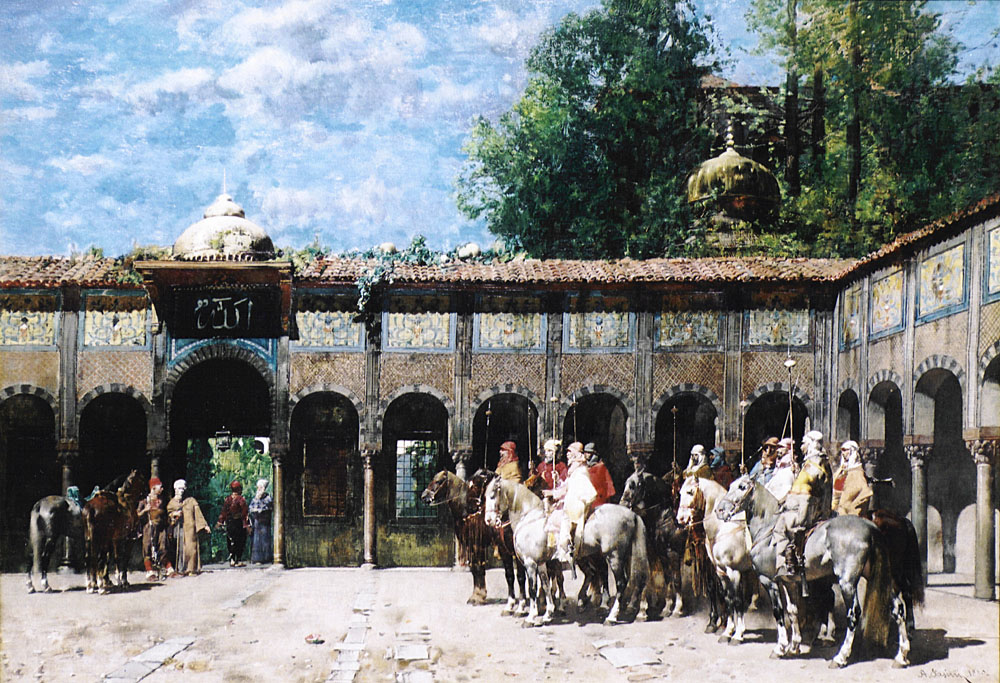
Arab Cavalry

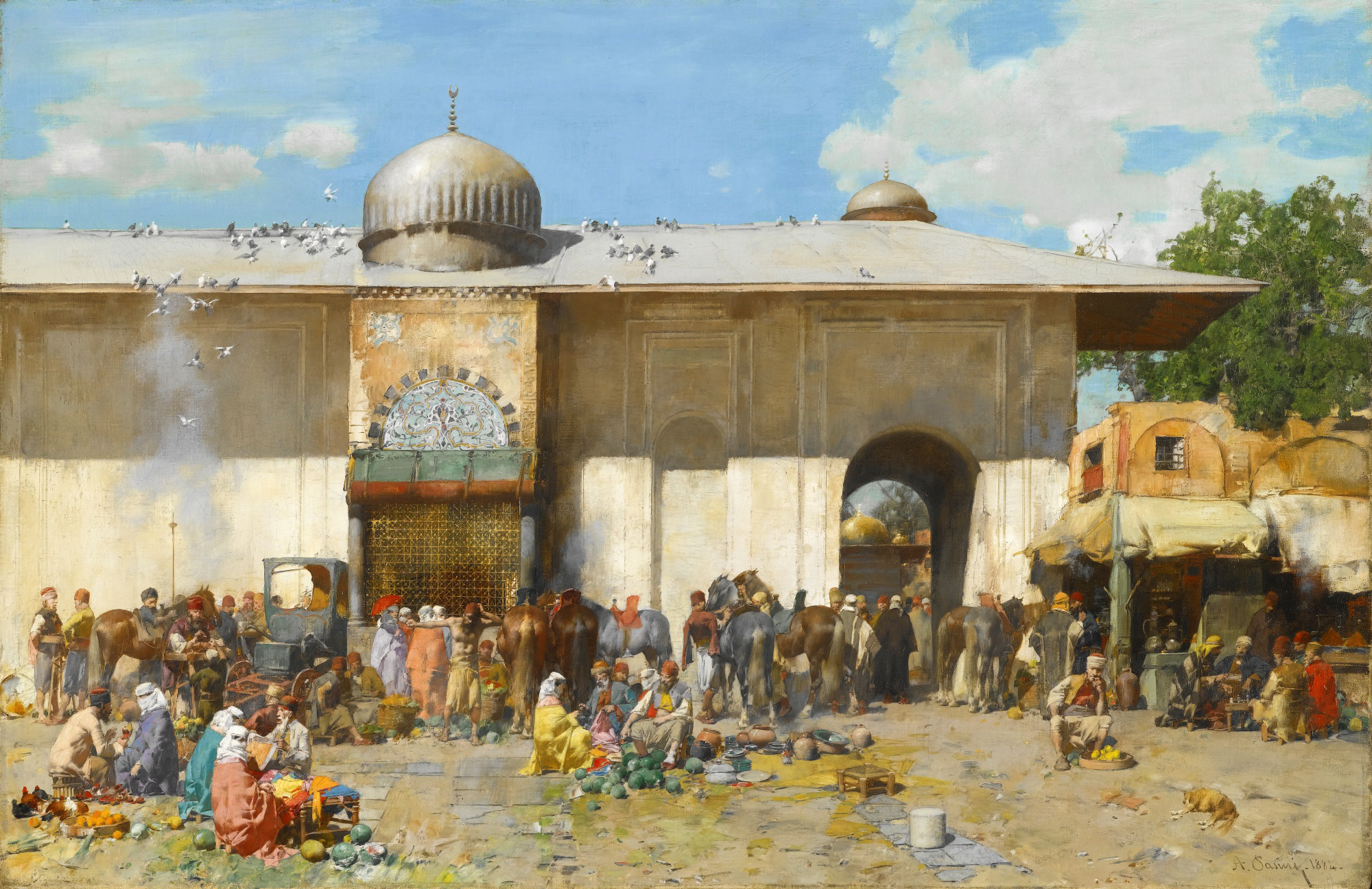
Market scene

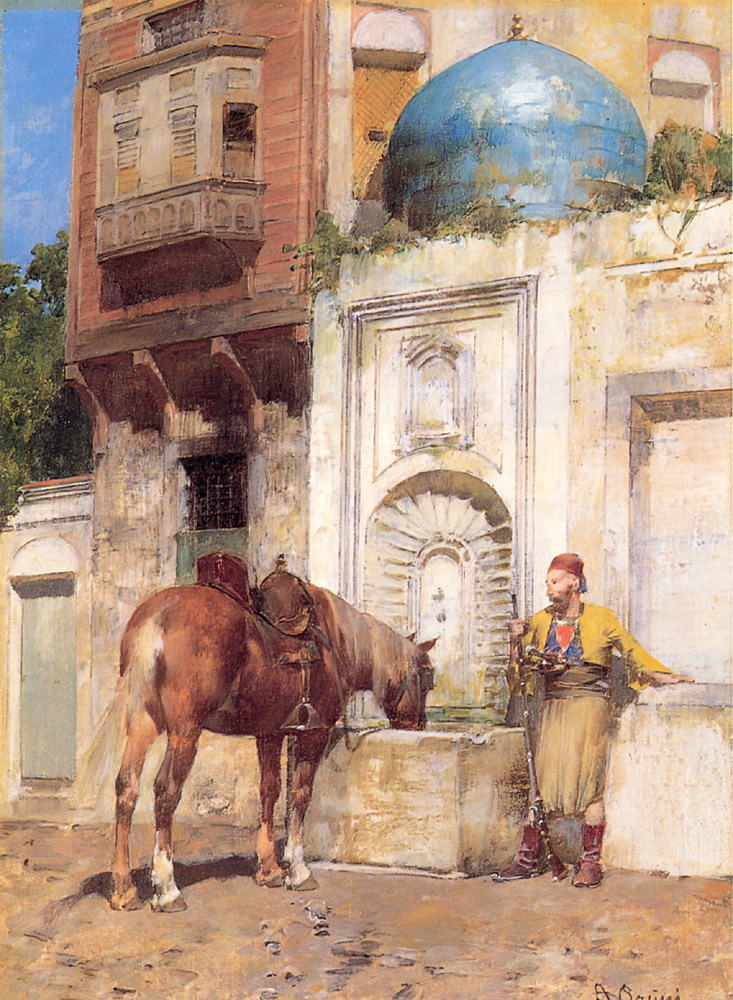
At the Trough

== See also ==
- List of Orientalist artists
- Orientalism
