= Jan Holschuh =

German sculptor

Jan Holschuh (Beerfelden, 9 August 1909 – Michelstadt, 2 August 2000) was a German sculptor and a designer. He was one of the leading contemporary ivory carving artists. Many of his ivory sculptures are housed in the German Ivory Museum Erbach. During his lifetime, he produced more than 200 sculptures from elephant ivory, mammoth ivory fossil, and amber. He won many awards, including the Grand Prix of 1929 Barcelona International Exposition and State Prize Munich in 1966.

After he finished studying ivory carving in Erbach, he continued his education in Königsberg, and then from 1931 to 1933 in Weimar, where he was educated by Walther Klemm and Ludwig Nick. From 1934 until his return to Erbach, he was the art director of Royal Amber Works in Königsberg.
