= Villa Strohl Fern =

Semi-urban palace, or casino, and gardens in Rome, Italy

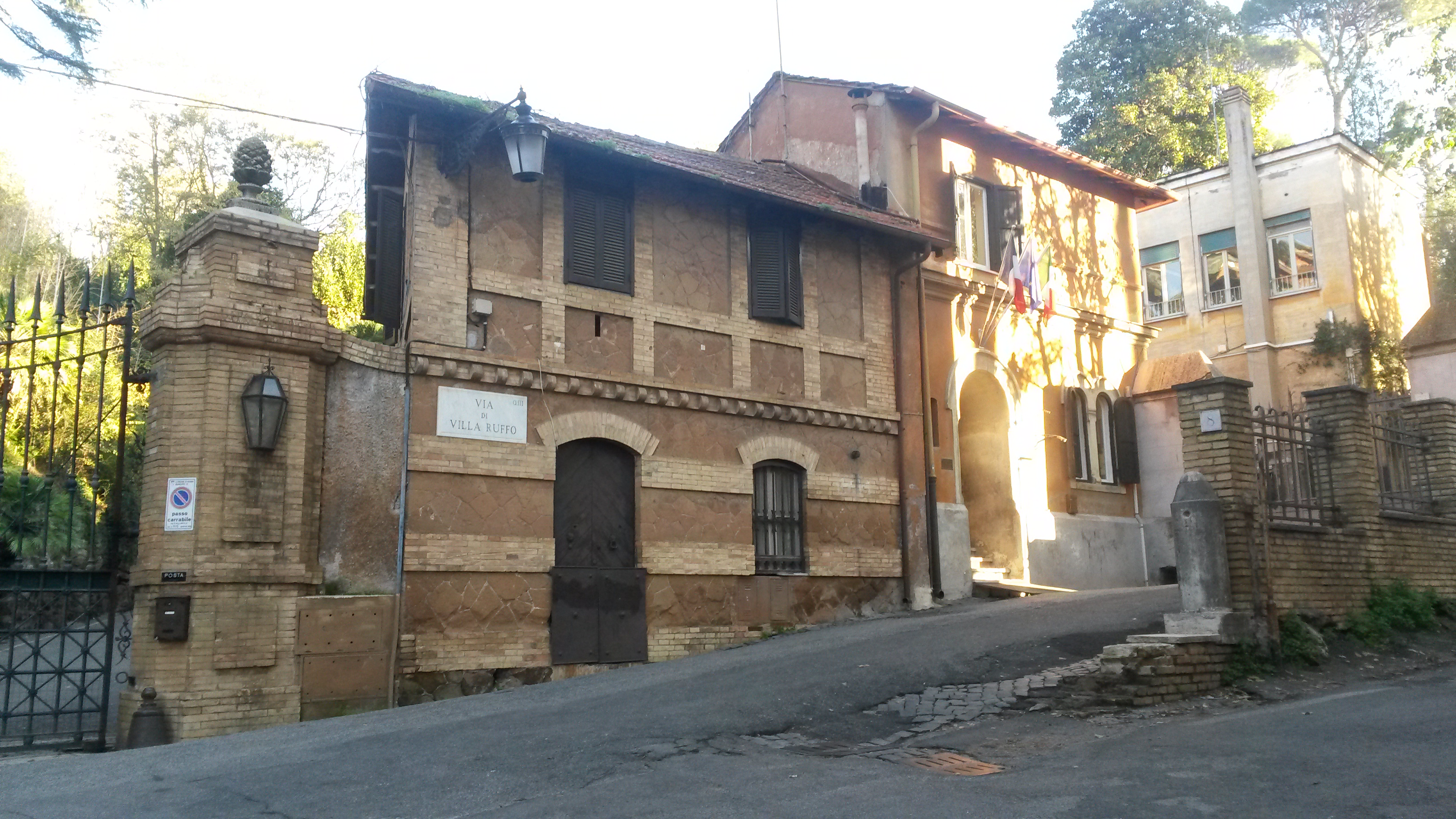
The Villa Strohl-Fern in 2014

The Villa Strohl Fern is a semi-urban Neo-Gothic-style, palace, or casino, and gardens erected in the late 19th century on the grounds of the Villa Borghese in Rome. It is known for having housed and provided studios for dozens of prominent artists in the late 19th and early 20th centuries. Entrances to the site, when open, are from Piazzale Flaminio, Avenue Madame Letizia, and across from the Villa Poniatowski, part of the National Etruscan Museum.

== History ==
The aristocratic Alsatian Alfred Wilhelm Strohl (1847–1927) was exiled from his native land soon after the German occupation in 1870. By 1879, he had purchased a substantial plot of land at the site, and built the main villa, and additional housing and studio facilities, and organized the gardens at the site. Strohl also designed the casino and gave it the name by adding the adjective "fern" (far away) to Strohl, to emphasize his exile.

The park contains odd elements such as cement trees, fountains adorned with stalactites, grottoes, covered bridges between sections of land at different levels, and an artificial pond with a cement boat on its bank. The property is best remembered for the diverse artistic community that Strohl gathered there, at small chalets in the park. Among the many artists who stayed at the site were Nicola D’Antino; Bruno Barilli; Alfredo Biagini; Amedeo Bocchi; Arnold Bocklin; Anton Giulio Bragaglia; Renato Brozzi; Ercole Drei; Emil Fuchs and his mistress, the painter Barbara Leoni; Vincenzo Gemito; Baldomer Gili i Roig; John William Godward; Virgilio Guidi; Carlo Levi; Arturo Martini; Umberto Moggioli; Ludwig Nick; Cipriano Efisio Oppo; Ilya Repin; the poet Rainer Maria Rilke and his wife in 1903–1904; Ottilie Reylaender; the sculptor Clara Westhoff; Aleardo Terzi; Francesco and his son Antonello Trombadori; and Mikhail Alexandrovich Vrubel.

After his death in 1927, Strohl was buried in the Protestant Cemetery, near the Pyramid of Cestius; and the property was willed to the French Government with a number of restrictions, including on the maintenance of the structures and purpose. In 1957 transferred it to the Lycée Chateaubriand.
