= Ludwig Nick =

German sculptor (1873–1936)

Ludwig Nick (30 January 1873 – July 1936) was a German sculptor and art professor, who worked in stone, bronze, wood and porcelain.

== Life and work ==
Nick was born in Münster. He was practically educated in stone and wood sculpting by Heinrich Fleige (1840–1890) there, and he visited the local Kunst- und Gewerbeschule. After practising his profession for several years, he started a six-year study at the Königliche akademische Hochschule für die bildenden Künste in Berlin, receiving master classes from Peter Breuer and Ernst Herter.

In 1905 – perhaps earlier also, and certainly several times more in the next decades – Nick was an attendee of the Große Berliner Kunstausstellung, a joint annual exposition of the Akademie and the Verein Berliner Künstler (Union of Berlin Artists). He showed a marble piece called 'Verlassen' ('Abandoned'), which was then bought by the German Emperor Wilhelm II. In 1908, Nick won a one-year travel scholarship from the Paul Schultze-Stiftung, better known as the Rom-Preis (Rome Award) of the Preußische Akademie der Künste. This meant he could reside 1908–1909 in Villa Strohl Fern in Rome. After the stay he started to work at the Berlin Akademie.

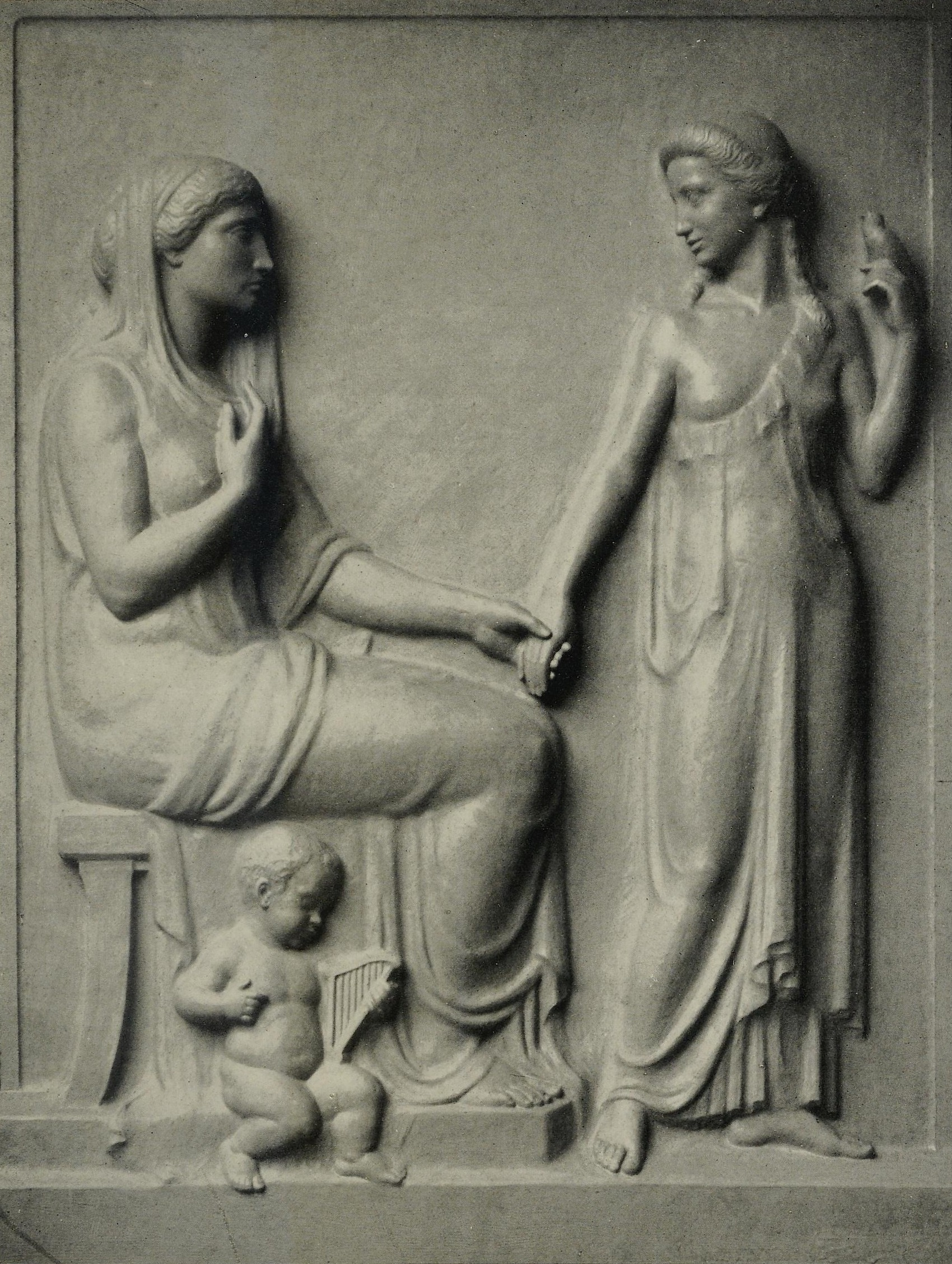
Funerary monument, c. 1913

In the years before World War I, Nick was the favorite collaborator of architect Edmund Körner, Nick's fellow student in Berlin. Körner, based in Essen and famous for his design of the Old Synagogue there, commissioned Nick for stone sculpture jewelry for public and private buildings, for a marmor fireplace and bronze statues for the court state Dippelshof in Darmstadt, and also for the giant nail man Schmied von Essen.

Meanwhile, he made other works too, among which funerary monuments in Berlin. Nick's only known public work outside Germany can be found in the Dutch city of Enschede, not far from Münster: in 1912 he was commissioned to create a monument in memory of the fire that fifty years earlier had burned down the town; in the same year, Nick created sculptures of Gerrit Jan van Heek (1837-1915), a textile manufacturer from Enschede, and his second wife Christine Friederike Van Heek-Meier (1842-1920), the parents of Jan Herman van Heek.

After the war had ended, in 1918, Nick created many war memorials, among other in Berlin-Schmargendorf. In 1924 he sculpted the stone lion for the Löwendenkmal, the warrior memorial for Leipzig University, a monument designed by August Gaul, who had died before finishing it. In 1925 he made a wooden epitaph for the members of the Berliner Liedertafel that fell in World War I.

In 1920 Walter Gropius' Bauhaus in Weimar was looking for a master craftsman for stone carving and gypsum foundry. The sculptor Richard Engelmann, professor at the Großherzoglich Sächsische Hochschule für Bildende Kunst, the older art school in Weimar, asked Gaul for a candidate, and Gaul recommended Nick. Gropius however declined the appointment, saying that there was "künstlerischer Ehrgeiz", artistic ambition, in Nick's work and that he looked more for a stonemason.

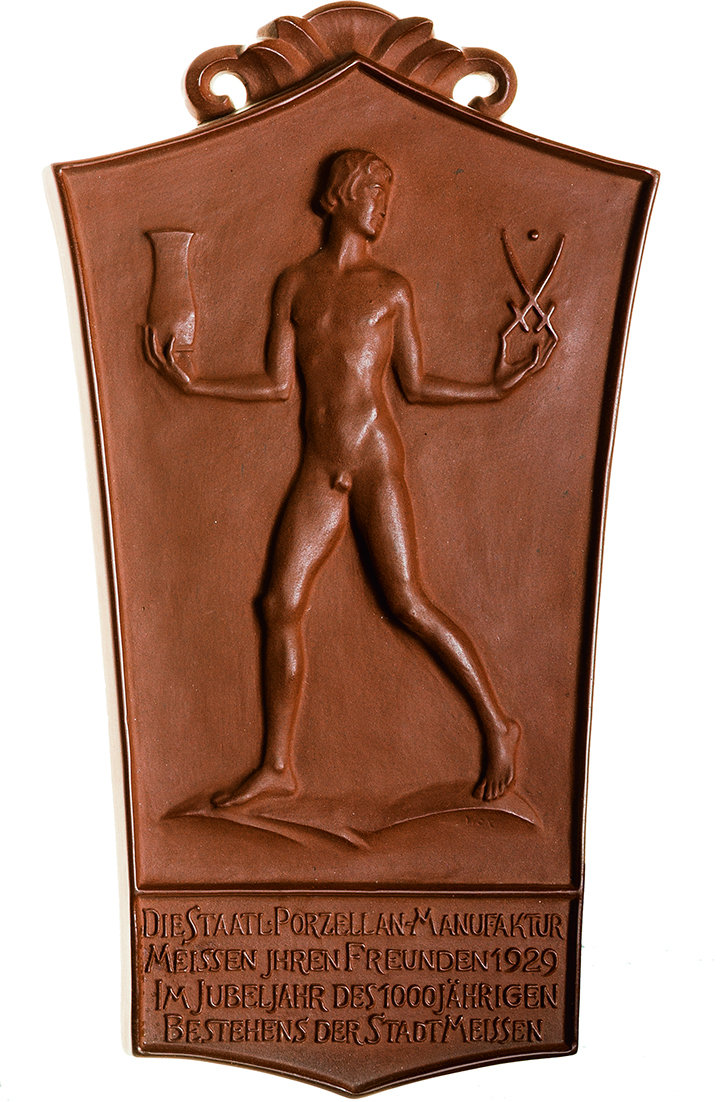
Meissen new year plaque for 1929

Nick worked freelance for Meissen porcelain from about 1927 to 1930 – the factory acquired several of his models. Among his Meissen works are Hirte (1929), Rübezahl (1930), Mutter mit Kind (1930) and other figurines, that often came in cheaper white and more expensive colored, sometimes gold decorated versions. His porcelain work was praised for its stylistic unity and pronounced main view. He designed the firm's new year plaque for 1929.

In 1930 he received the sculptor price of the Verein Berliner Künstler. The same year the City of Berlin purchased Nick's Madonna, a piece that was on display at the Verein's autumn exposition.

In Weimar in 1930, the architect, critic and NSDAP member Paul Schultze-Naumburg on the initiative of Wilhelm Frick got in charge of the Weimar Hochschule. He set up a section for crafts and sculpture (it was in fact a private school, separate from the Hochschule) in Gropius' Bauhaus building in Dessau. Engelmann had been fired and Schultze Naumburg didn't want him to return, he had Nick leading the section. Engelmann's work lacked the Heimat expression and the steel, folk element as they were perceived or wanted in that time, while Nick's figures looked incomparably slimmer and more sinewy, therefor corresponding more to the new ideal.

After the Gleichschaltung of 1933, Nick became head of the workshop for stone and wood carving in Weimar. He became a member of the Deutscher Werkbund in 1934, and he would keep his position until his death in 1936. Among Nick's students was Jan Holschuh.

In 1936 he created the chain of office for the mayor of Eisenach and in Gerstungen he finished his Storchenbrunnen.

== Some works ==
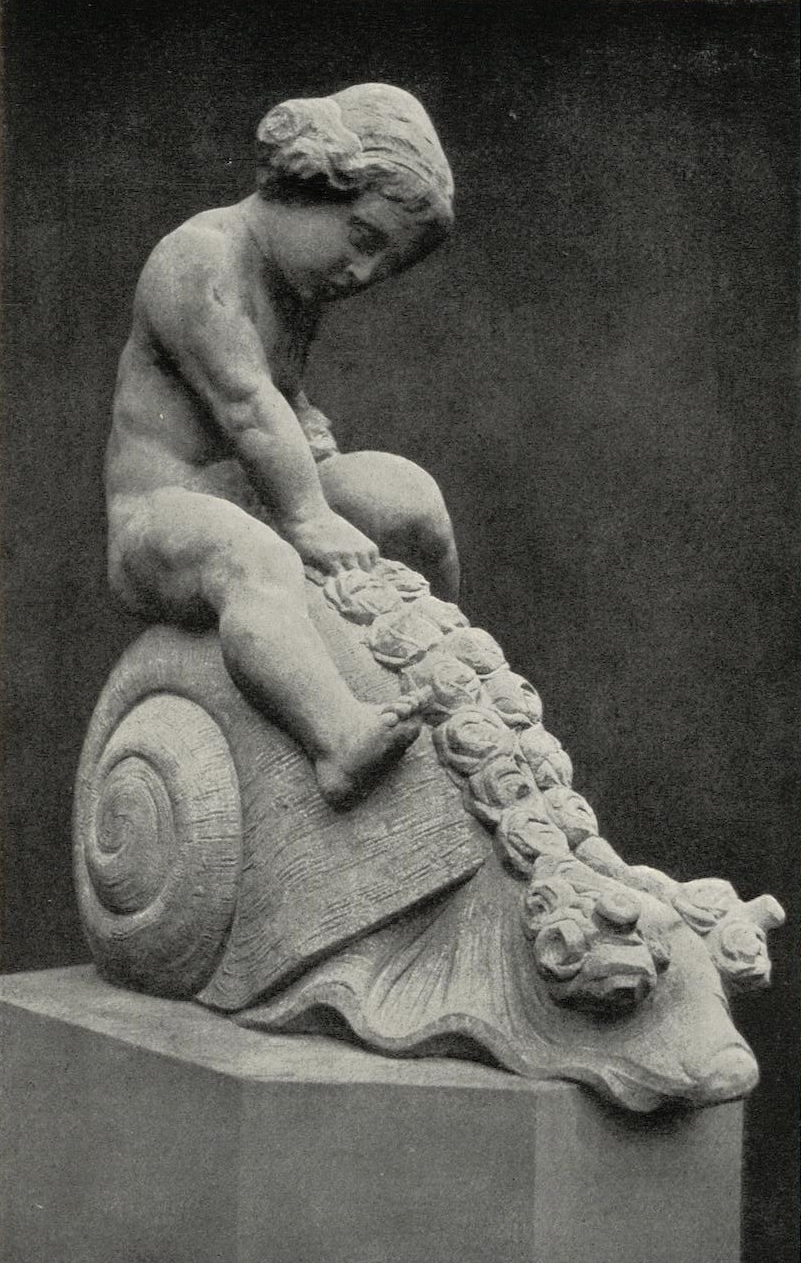
Fountain sculpture (c. 1914), Essen

- Brandmonument (1912), the "Fire monument" in Enschede, commemorating the city fire of 7 May 1862 that destroyed the entire inner city, ended the lives of two women and left 3675 inhabitants roofless. The 5 meter high monument is made of grey sandstone, carrying bronze plates and the city's coat of arms at the sides and a sculpture of a female figure with a horn of plenty on top, and it has two side basins for the water that comes from lion heads.
- Schmied von Essen (1915), "Blacksmith of Essen", a 3.5 meter high nail man relief, an oak wood triptych housed in a white, temple-like pavilion designed by Körner that was built on the forecourt of Essen Hauptbahnhof. The central figure, the 'iron man' standing before an Iron Cross, held a sword and a shield with the Reichsadler; next to his head were the words Gott mit uns, lying at the feet a 8-headed Hydra, its heads symbolizing the enemies of Germany; the side panels held two quotes from Wilhelm II. Only forged and galvanized iron nails were used for the nailing of the apron, the sword and the shield. The pavilion was dismantled in 1918, the year the Emperor abdicated, and after the central figure had been restored it was re-erected in the city park StadtGarten Essen, before being moved to the Grugapark in 1934, where it was lost during a bombardment in World War II.
- Löwendenkmal der Universität Leipzig (1924), a monument baring the names of 1396 students and employees that have fallen in World War I. Designed by Gaul, the memorial was finished by his student Max Esser, while Nick was commissioned to sculpt the lion.
- Two sandstone figures (1935), personifications of the "Nährstand" (farmers class) and the "Wehrstand" (nobility class), on the stepped gables of a bank building by Schultze-Naumburg in Parchim.
- Storchenbrunnen (1934–36), "Stork well" in Gerstungen, an octagonal Muschelkalk fountain with animal figurines decorating a four spouts central water inlet that is topped by a slender limestone column carrying a roughly life-size bronze stork, the heraldic charge of the community.
- Chain of office for the mayor of Eisenach (1936). In 1945 the National Socialist symbols were removed from the chain.

== Gallery ==
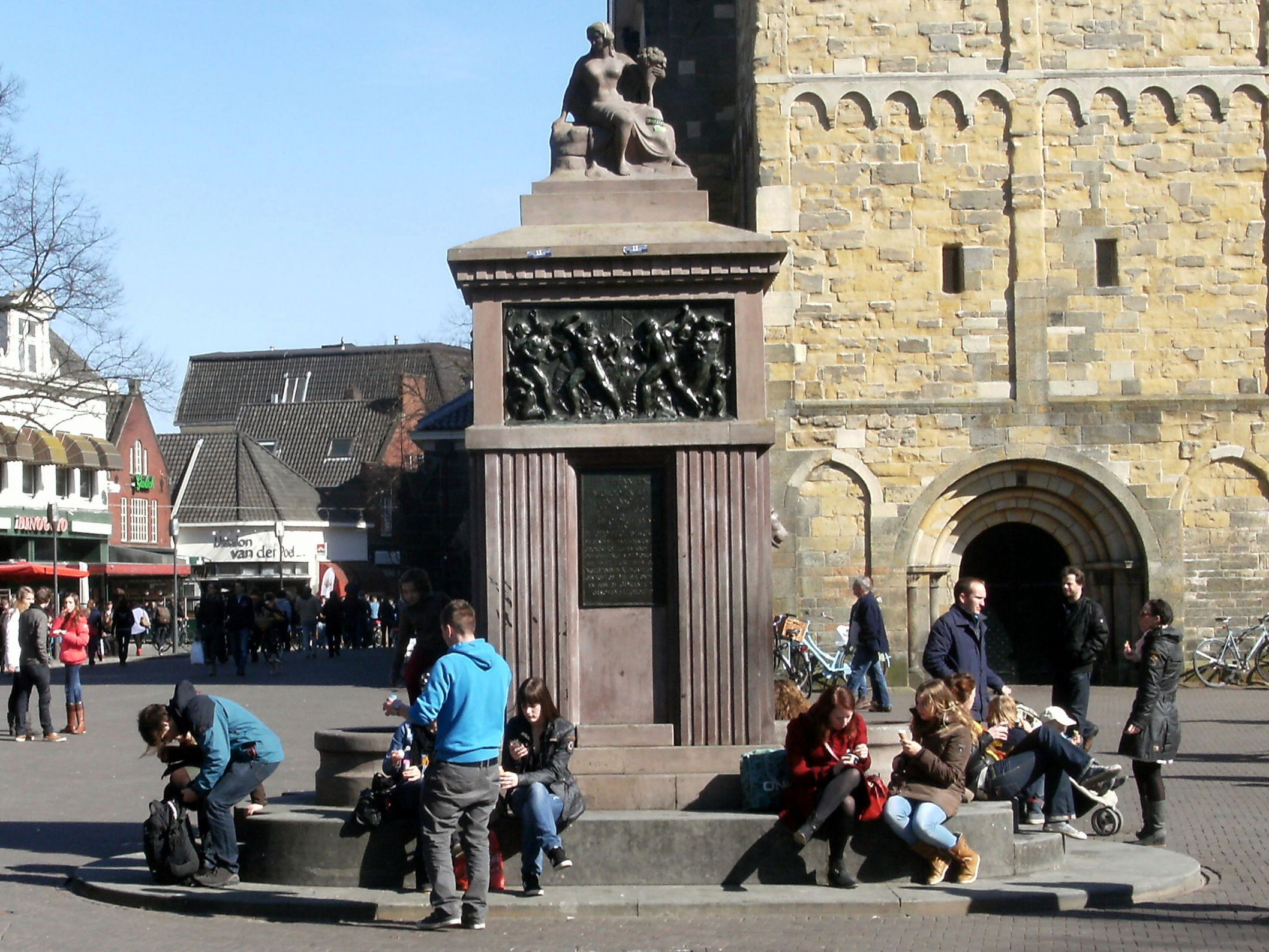
Brandmonument (1912), Enschede

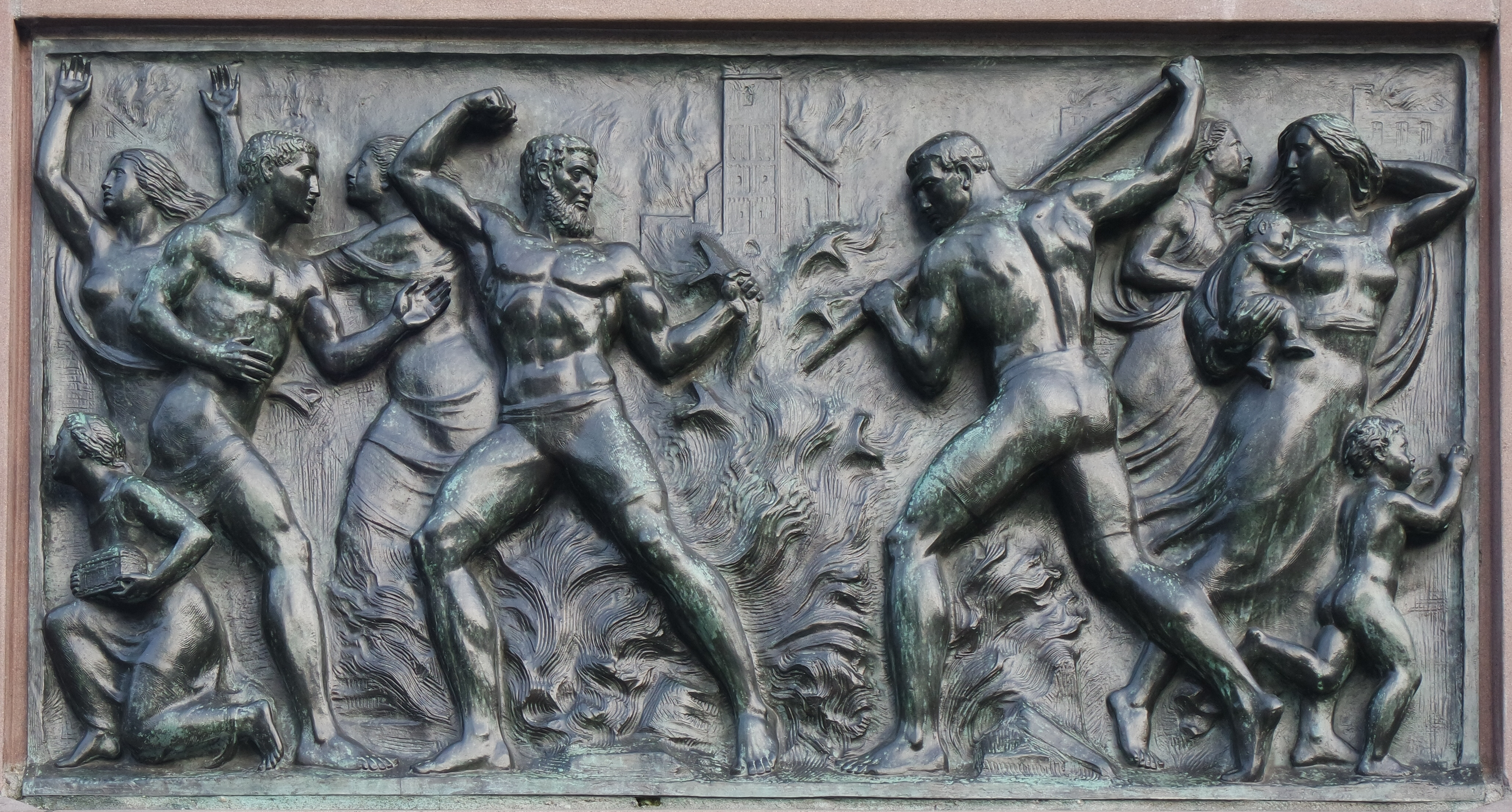
Detail of the Brandmonument

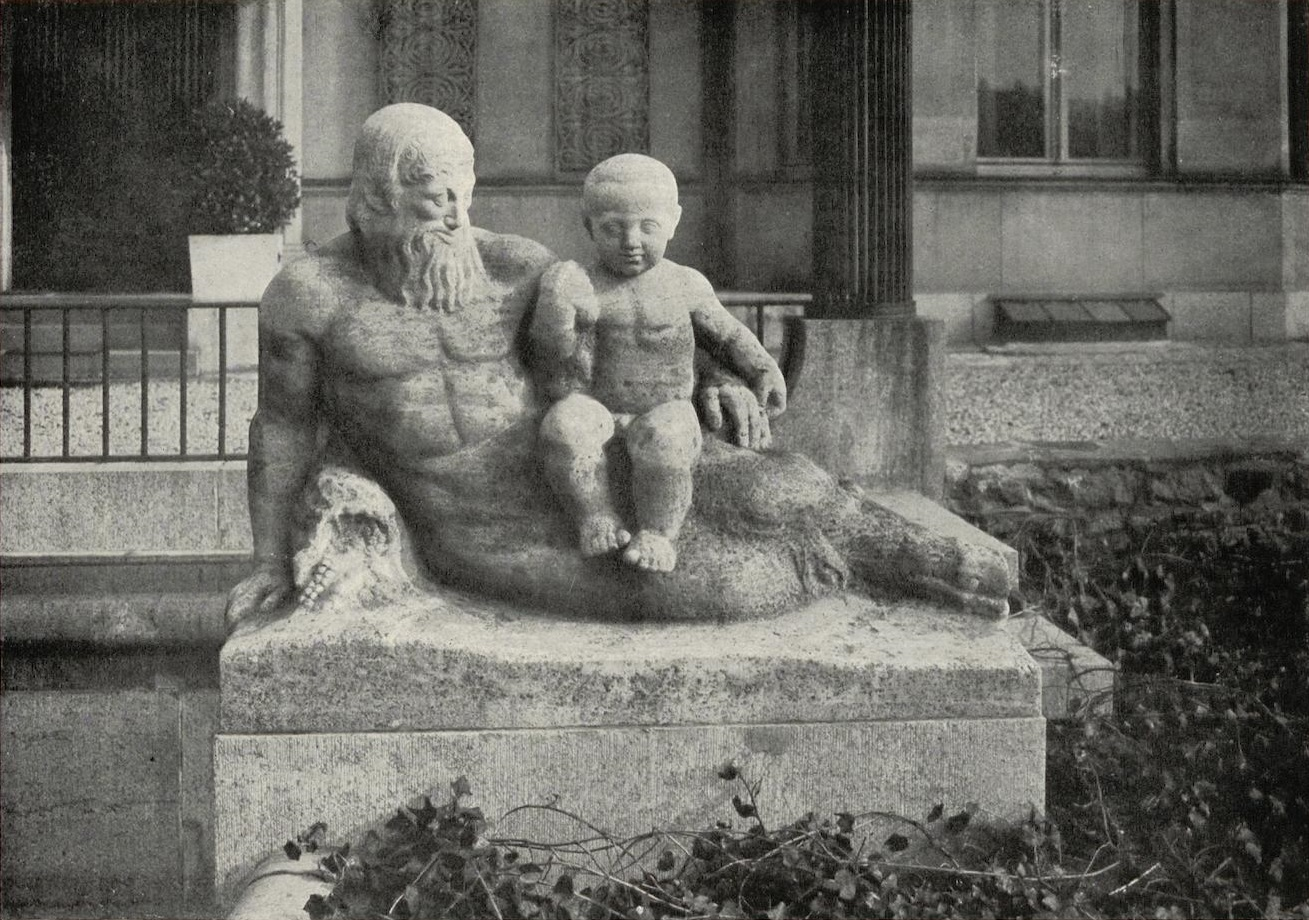
Fountain figure (c. 1912), Essen

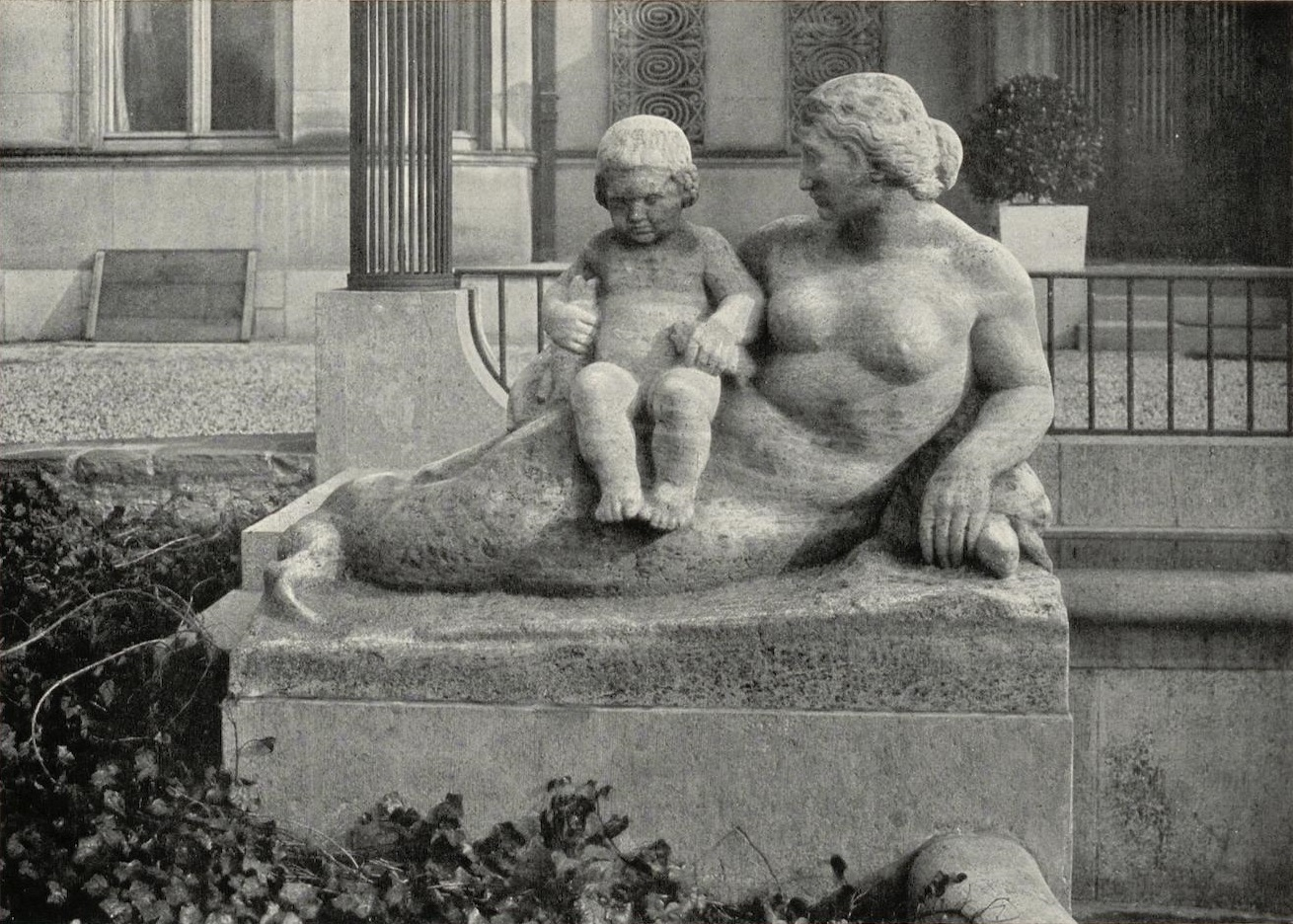
Fountain figure (c. 1912), Essen

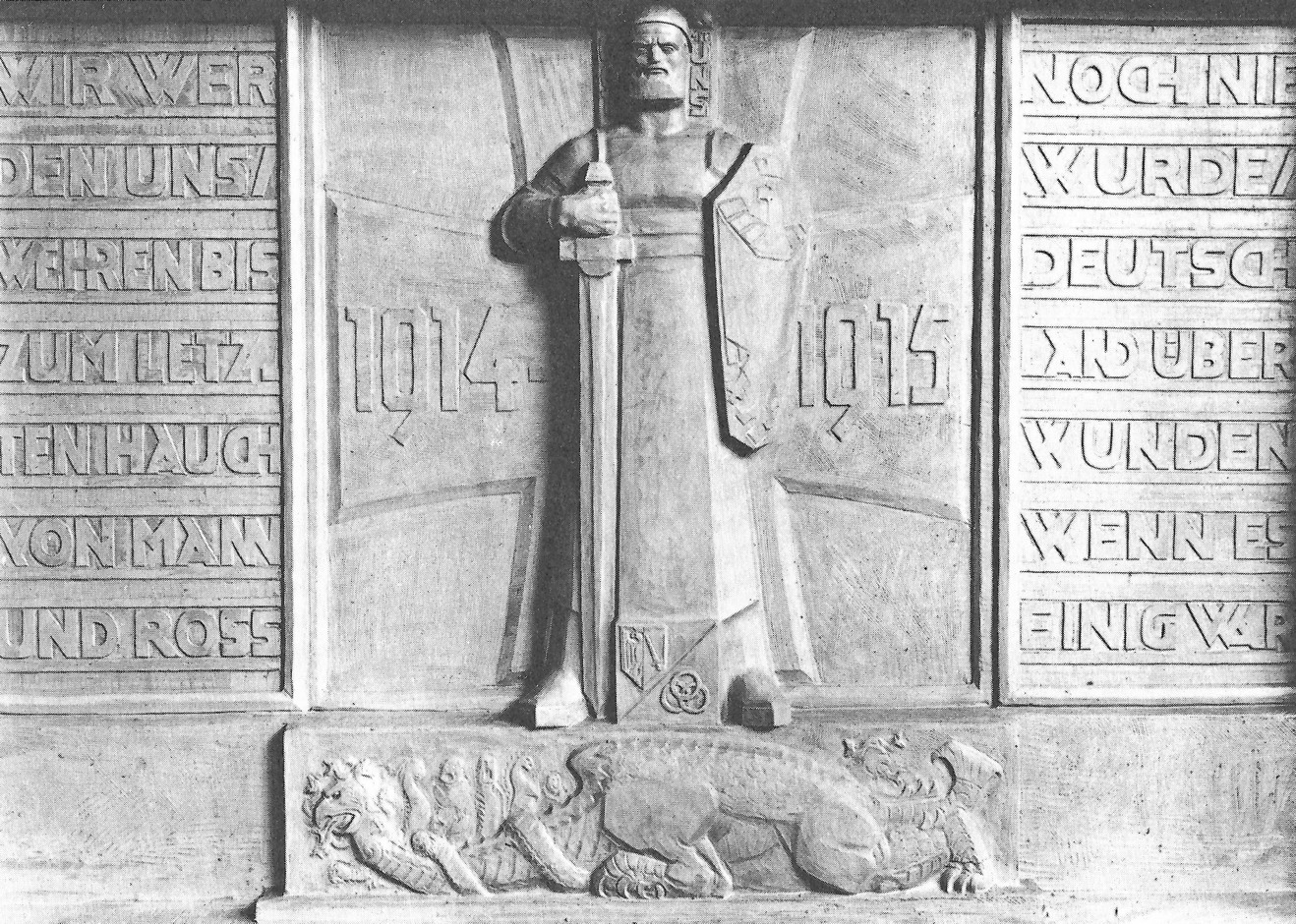
Schmied von Essen (1915), Essen

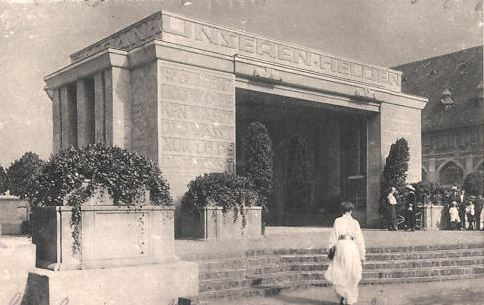
Pavilion of the Schmied von Essen

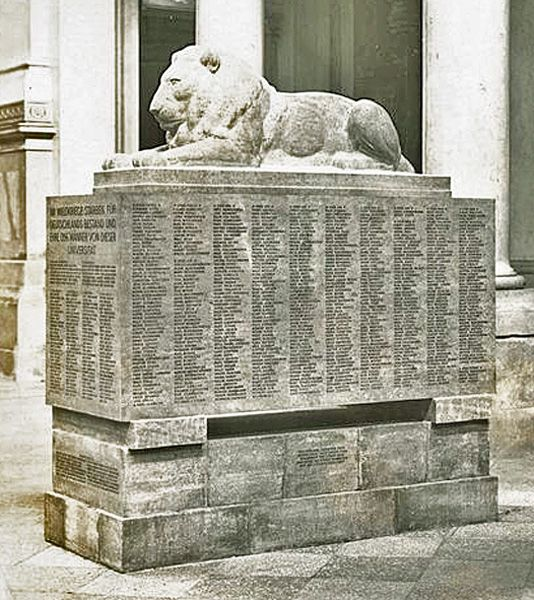
"Lion memorial" (1924), Leipzig

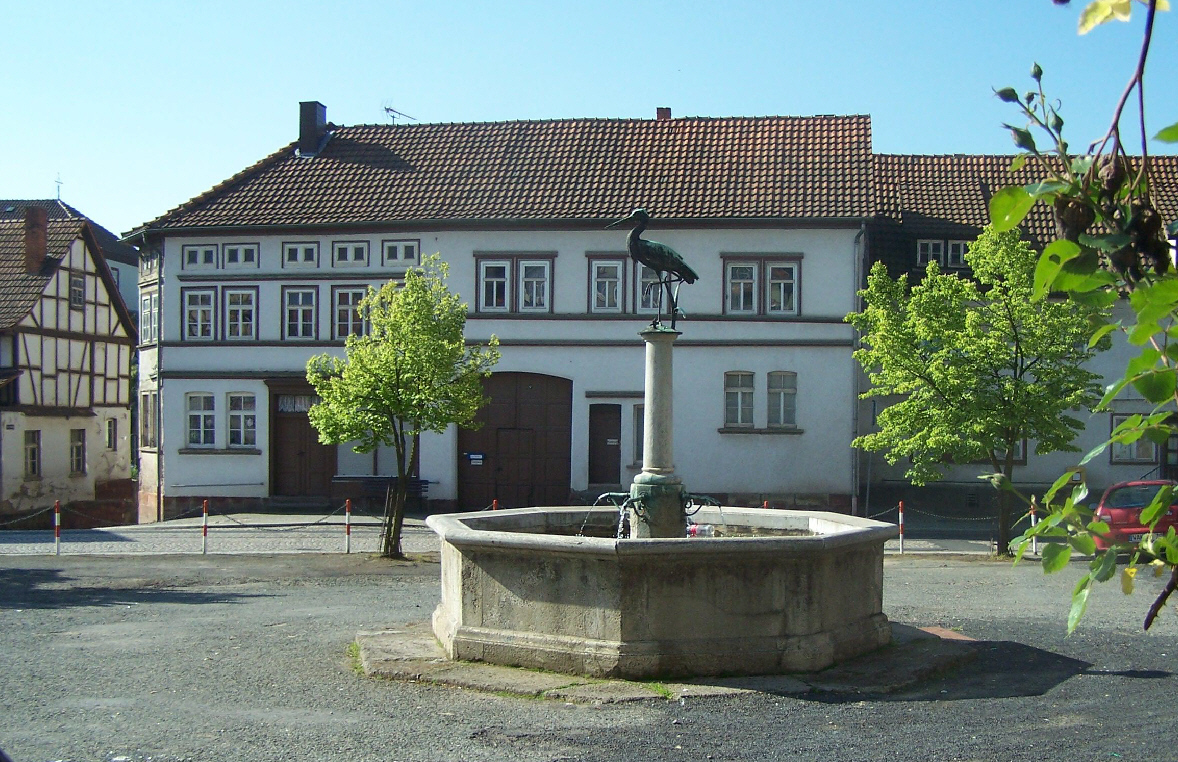
Storchenbrunnen (1936), Gerstungen
