= Amedeo Bocchi =

Italian painter (1883–1976)

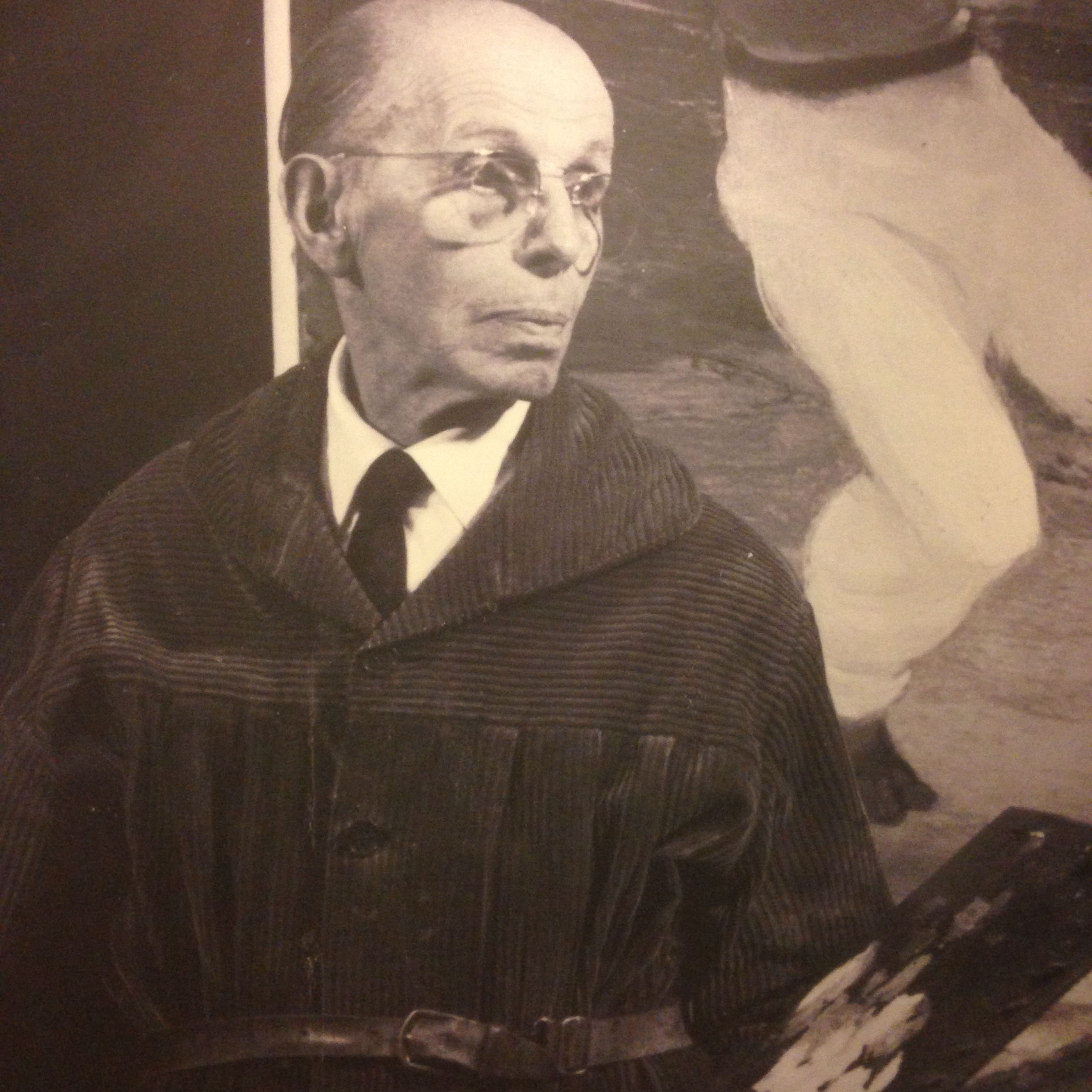
Amedeo Bocchi

Amedeo Bocchi (August 24, 1883 – December 16, 1976) was an Italian painter.

== Biography ==
He was born on August 24, 1883, in Parma, to a father who worked in painting wall decorations. At the age of 12 years, he was enrolled in the Royal Institute of Fine Arts of Parma, under the direction of Cecrope Barilli. In 1901, at the age of 18 years he was graduated, and Barilli prompted him to travel to Rome to the Scuola del Nudo on Via Ripetta.

In Rome he married, and in 1908 his only daughter Bianca was born, but his wife Rita died the next year. His daughter was to be a frequent object of his paintings until her untimely death in 1934. In 1919, Bocchi remarried a model for his paintings, but she died four years later.

In 1910, he submitted two paintings to the Biennale in Venice. He moved to Padua to work alongside Achille Casanova, in fresco decorations for the Basilica of Sant'Antonio.

He collaborated with the painters Latino Barilli, Daniele de Strobel, and Renato Brozzi, in the restorations of the Sala d’Oro of the Castello di Torrechiara near Parma. In 1911, he encountered the work of Gustav Klimt, and began to travel to Terracina to paint.

He was commissioned to decorate the Sala Consiliare of the Cassa di Risparmio di Parma. In 1915, he found a place to work and live in Villa Strohl-Fern in Rome under the patronage of Alfred Strohl. There he remained the rest of his life.

His Portrait of Bianca was awarded a first prize at the Exhibition of Monza. He was named an Academic of the Accademia di San Luca in Rome. He continued to paint till his death.

The Palazzo Sanvitale in Parma, belonging to the Fondazione Monte Parma, since 1999 houses the Museo Amedeo Bocchi focused on his works.
