= Antonio Pasini =

Italian painter (1770–1845)

Antonio Pasini (21 February 1770 – 23 July 1845) was an Italian painter and manuscript illuminator.

He trained under Domenico Muzzi in Parma. In 1805, he was nominated as Professor of Miniatura for the Accademia di Belle Arti of Parma. In 1816, he became portraitist for the local court. In 1822, he was named Teacher of Composizione e di Anatomia in Parma. He was adept at painting miniature portraits on ivory.

Among his pupils were Francesco Scaramuzza, Macedonio Melloni, Evangelista Pinelli and Vincenzo Bertolotti.
