= Palazzo Sanvitale =

Coordinates: 44°48′5.73″N 10°19′52.03″E

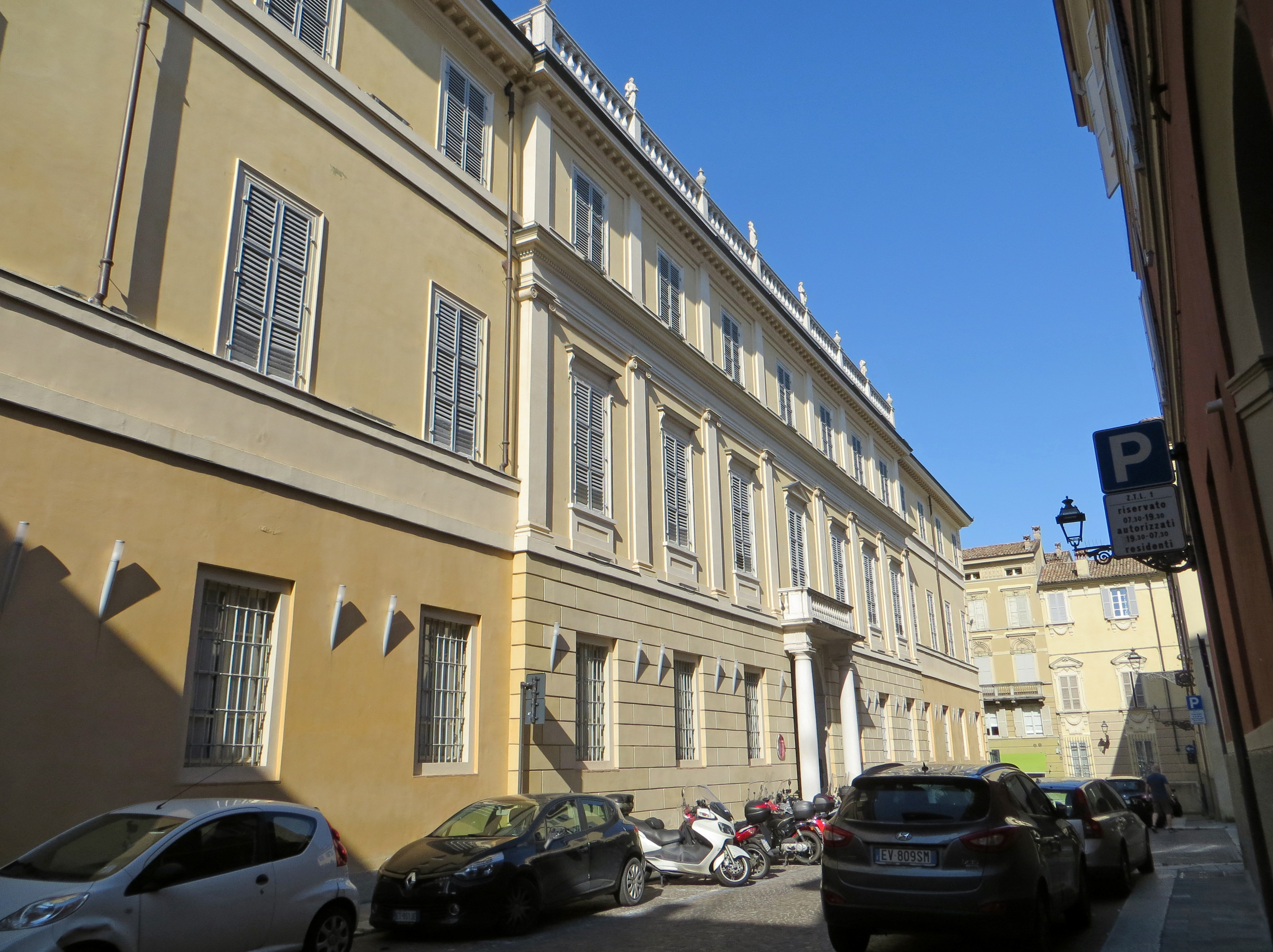
Façade

The Palazzo Sanvitale is a palace located on Piazzale Sanvitale #1 in central Parma, region of Emilia-Romagna, Italy. The palace now houses a museum.

== History ==
The palace has undergone a number of reconstructions. In the 18th century, the architect Angelo Rasori, reformulated the center facade in a Neoclassical-style, and built the entry staircase (scalone d'onore). The palace still retains some of the 19th-century interior decoration. In 1951 with the death of Giuseppe Sanvitale, the building was willed to an order of nuns. The palace now belongs to the Fondazione Monte Parma, and since 1999 houses the Museo Amedeo Bocchi focused on the 20th-century Parmesan painter.
