= Giorgio Scherer =

Italian painter (1831–1896)

Giorgio Scherer (1831–1896) was an Italian painter, mainly of genre paintings.

He was born and resident in Parma. Among his many works, he exhibited an oil canvas in 1870 in Parma depicting; Titian and Odoardo Farnese; Consolare gli afflitti; La mascherata. In 1882, a Florence; A lesson at the piano forte; An unfortunate news; exhibited in the next year, at the same Exposition. The son of the soldier; Il merciaio ambulante, exhibited in 1884 in Turin.
