= Daniele de Strobel =

Italian painter (1873–1942)

Daniele de Strobel (Parma, 30 March 1873 – Camogli, 8 June 1942) was an Italian painter, mostly known for his fresco work in Parma and Piacenza.

== Biography ==
De Strobel was born in Parma. He attended the local Academy of Fine Arts and the Académie de France in Rome, where he befriended Amedeo Bocchi and Antonio Mancini. He was invited to exhibit his work at the third edition of the Venice Biennale in 1889. After 1910 his style was strongly influenced by the divisionism of Gaetano Previati and Plinio Nomellini. In 1925 he became Professor of Fine Art at the Brera Academy in Milan.

De Strobel died in Camogli, Liguria, in 1942.

== Selected works ==
- La piccola mendicante del comune di Soragna (1890) (Academy of Fine Arts, Parma)
- Scena campestre (1895) (Academy of Fine Arts, Parma)
- Rogo d’eroi (1905). Winner of Premio della Pace at a 1906 exhibition in Milan. The painting denounces the cruelty of the Russian-Japanese war of 1904-1905 (Cassa di Risparmio di Parma)
- La faida di Comune (1906)
- Decoration of the Sala del Consiglio della Camera di Commercio (now Cassa di Risparmio di Parma e Piacenza) in collaboration with Giuseppe Carmignani (1925)
- I Quattro cavalieri dell'apocalisse (1942)
