= Del Puerto =

Del Puerto is a topographic byname/surname literally meaning "by the port/harbor". Notable people with the name include:

- Arantza del Puerto, Spanish former footballer
- Arístides del Puerto, Paraguayan footballer
- Arturo Del Puerto, American actor
- David del Puerto, Spanish composer
- Diego del Puerto (fl. early 16th century) was a Spanish music theorist
- Isabel del Puerto (1921–2014), Austrian-born noblewoman Mexican-American model, actress, dancer, writer, photojournalist, realtor and entrepreneur
- Julen Rementería del Puerto, Mexican politician
- Marie Lopez del Puerto, Mexican American physicist
- Nicolás Ortiz del Puerto y Colmenares Salgado
- Ramón Aldana del Puerto (1833–1882), Mexican journalist, playwright, lawyer, and politician

== See also ==
- de Porta
