= De Montibus =

de Montibus (Latin), del Monte/da Monte (Italian) or de Monte/de Mont (French) is a topographic byname/surname literally meaning "from the mountains/mountain". Notable people with the name include:

== De Monte ==
- Andrea De Monte
- Dante De Monte
- Hector de Monte
- Lambertus de Monte
- Philippe de Monte
- Petrus de Monte Libano
- Pierre de Monte
- Pietro del Monte
- Robertus de Monte

== De Montibus ==
- Ebulo de Montibus or Ebal II de Mont (c.1230 – 1269) English nobleman of Savoy origin
- Jean Bourgeois de Montibus (fl. 1506), Roman Catholic prelate
- William de Montibus or William de Monte (d. 1213), theologian and teacher

== Other ==
Sometimes the byname included the name or epithet of the mountain in question.

- Bernard de Monte Alto, Scottish knight
- Riccoldo da Monte di Croce
- Eustace de Montaut (de Monte Alto)

== See also ==
- Delmont (surname)
- Delmonte
- del Monte (surname)
