= Saint Didacus of Alcalá Presenting Juan de Herrera's Son to Christ =

Painting by Annibale Carracci

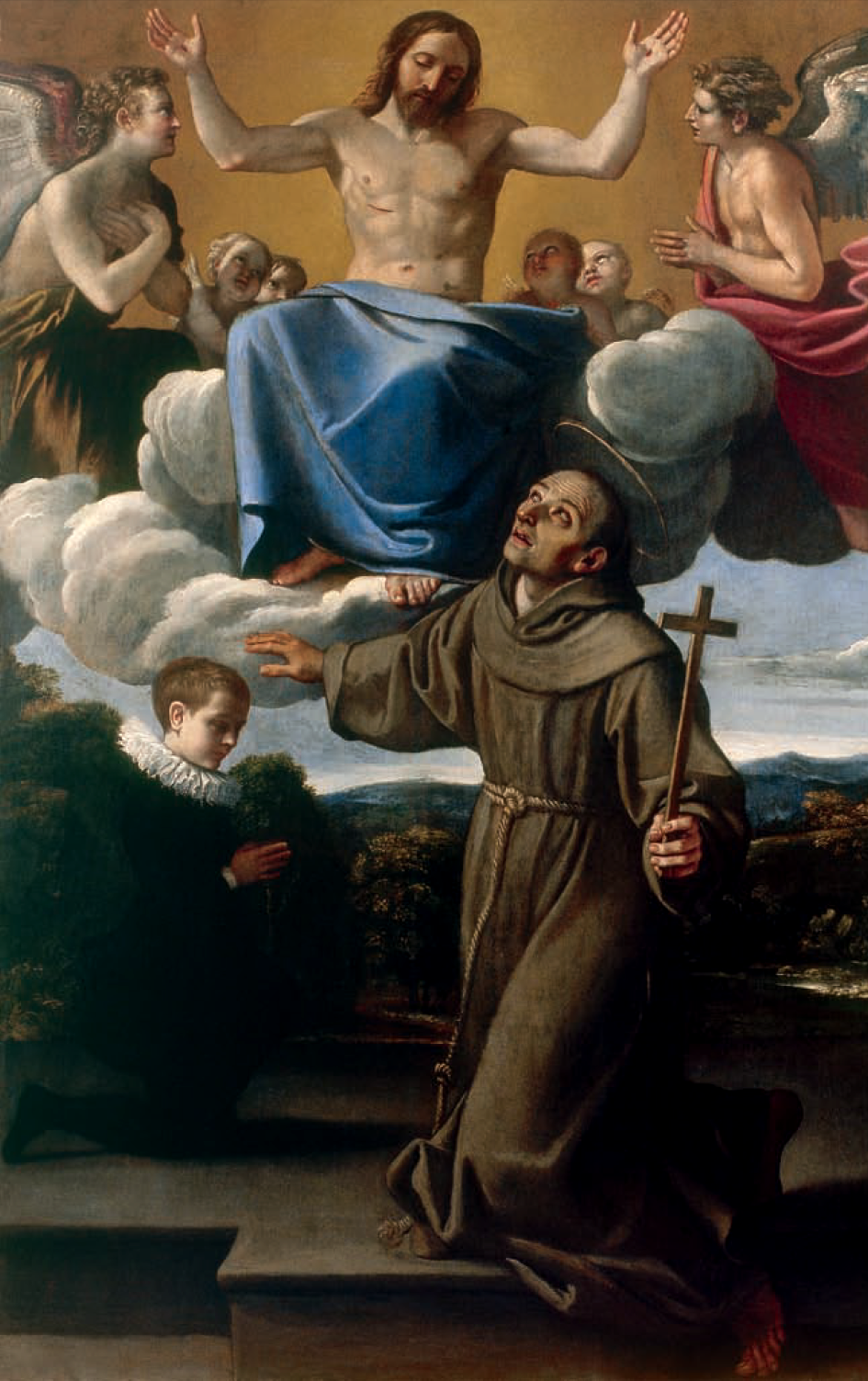
Saint Didacus of Alcalá Presenting Juan de Herrera's Son to Christ (c. 1606) by Annibale Carracci

Saint Didacus of Alcalá Presenting Juan de Herrera's Son to Christ is a c.1606 oil on panel painting by the Italian Baroque master Annibale Carracci, possibly with studio assistance. Probably his last public work, it is now in a chapel of the church of Santa Maria in Monserrato degli Spagnoli in Rome.

== History ==
It was produced as the altarpiece for the Spanish banker Juan Enriquez de Herrera's (1539–1610) family chapel in San Giacomo degli Spagnoli, then Spain's national church in Rome and later rebuilt from scratch to become Nostra Signora del Sacro Cuore. Herrera also commissioned Carracci to decorate the whole chapel, producing designs for frescoes by his students Francesco Albani, Sisto Badalocchio, Giovanni Lanfranco and Domenichino. Work on the chapel started in 1602 as an ex voto for Herrera's son Diego, named after Didacus of Alcalá, both of whom appear in the altarpiece.

The painting and many of the church's other furnishings were taken to Santa Maria in Monserrato when it replaced San Giacomo as the Spanish national church. The Herrera chapel frescoes remained in their original location until the 19th century, when they were divided between the Museu nacional d'art de Catalunya in Barcelona and the Museo del Prado in Madrid.

== Autograph status ==
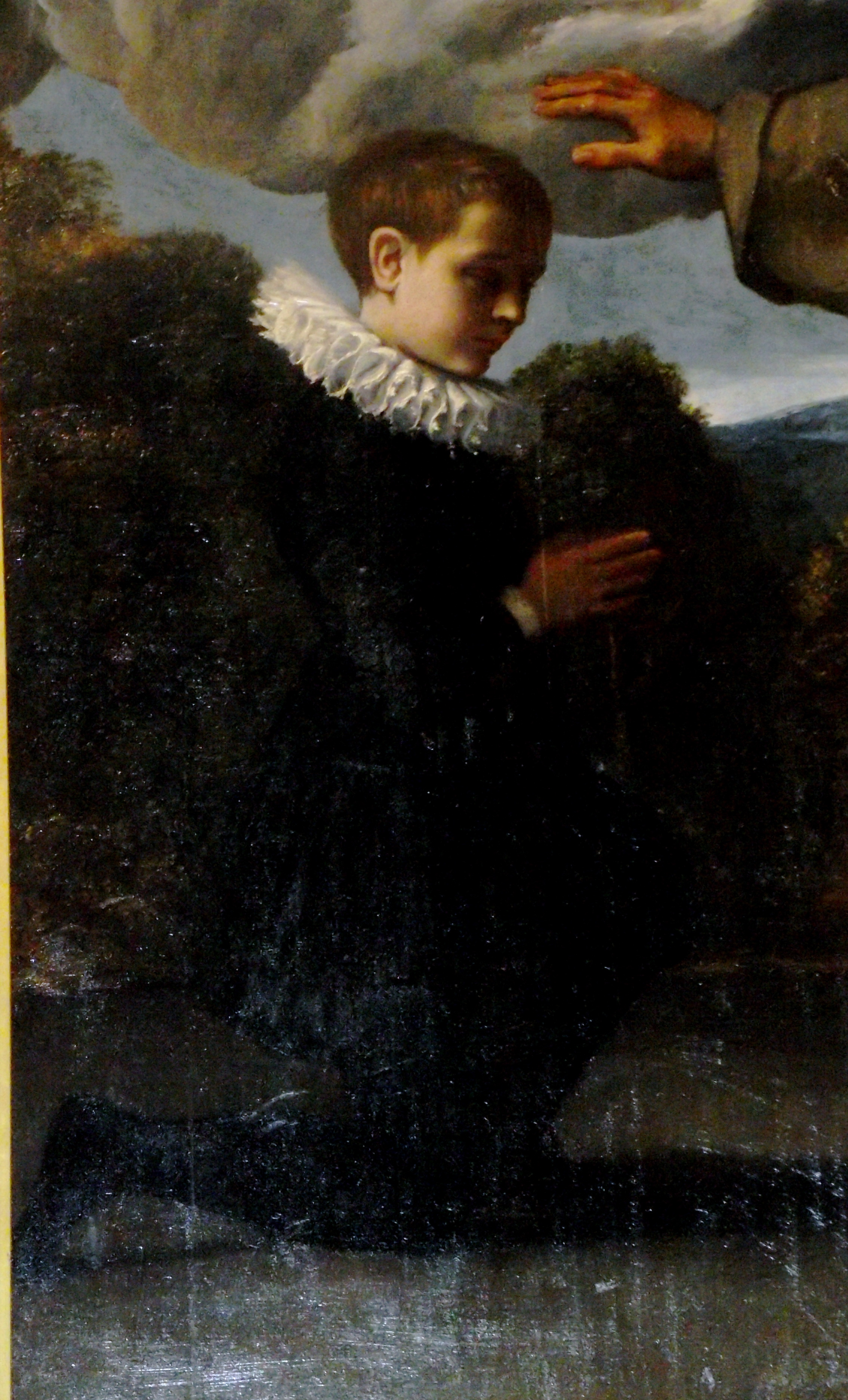
Detail of Diego de Herrara

The ancient sources (among others Mancini and Bellori), while attesting to the extensive intervention of the students in the execution of the frescoes, agree in saying that the altarpiece is autograph.

The historiography of the second half of the twentieth century has instead advanced many doubts about the full authorship of the painting by Carracci, based first of all on the perceptible stylistic difference between the upper part of the painting (Christ in glory among angels) and the lower part (the saint, the child and the landscape in the background) and then on the circumstance that, in the years of the probable realization of the painting, Annibale was already debilitated by the illness that would lead to his death a few years later, a period in which the Bolognese master was less and less active. The very broad delegation given to the students for the wall decoration of the Herrera chapel would be the demonstration of the substantial inactivity of the youngest of the Carracci during his infirmity, a situation considered little compatible with the personal realization of a large altarpiece.

In any case, except for extreme positions that consider the panel to be purely a workshop work, even the critical positions that see the contribution of assistants accept the attribution of some parts of the composition to Annibale. In particular, there is substantial agreement on the fact that at least the figure of the young Diego de Herrera – plausibly painted from life – is the fruit of Annibale's brush.

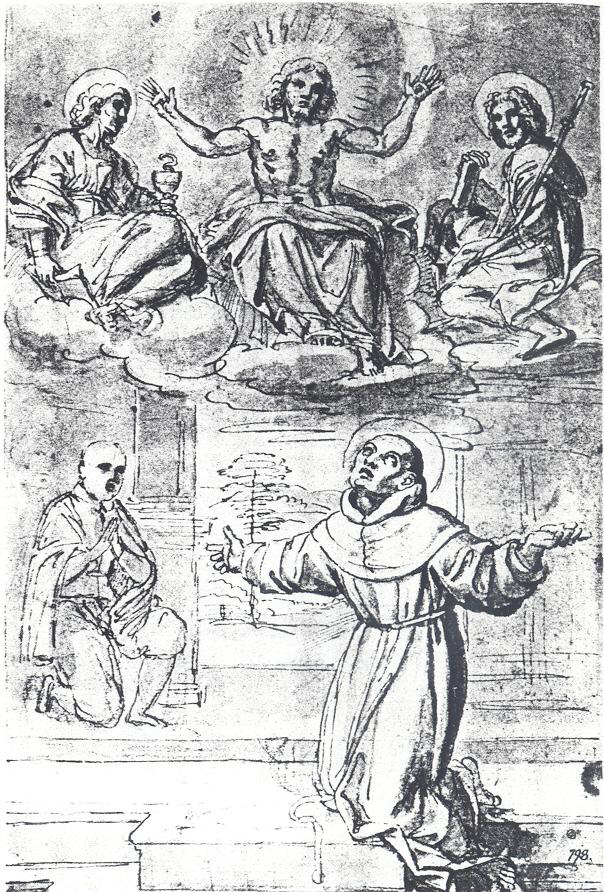
Preparatory drawing, Stockholm, Nationalmuseum

More generally, there is a certain tendency to recognize the hand of the master in the lower register, also in consideration of the high stylistic level of the landscape and the effectiveness of the figure of San Diego.

As regards the upper register, however, the majority of critics exclude Annibale's intervention, attributing it now to one or another of the students involved in the decoration of the chapel walls, or seeing the simultaneous contribution of more than one of them.

Ultimately, however, the entire composition has been decisively brought back to Carracci, justifying the difference between the two registers by recognizing, in the upper part, an academic execution – which also made use of models already tested in Carracci's production – and, in the lower part, a realistic treatment.

The patron Jaun de Herrera took very badly the news that little or nothing of Annibale could fit on the walls of his chapel and, for this reason, initially refused to pay the agreed advances and threatened to sue. The execution of the altarpiece entirely by the master could have been, then, a "reparation" on the part of Annibale in the face of the energetic protests of his patron.

The debate on the authorship of the altarpiece is further fueled by doubts about the ownership of the beautiful preparatory drawing preserved in Stockholm, which some critics attribute to Francesco Albani.

== Analysis ==
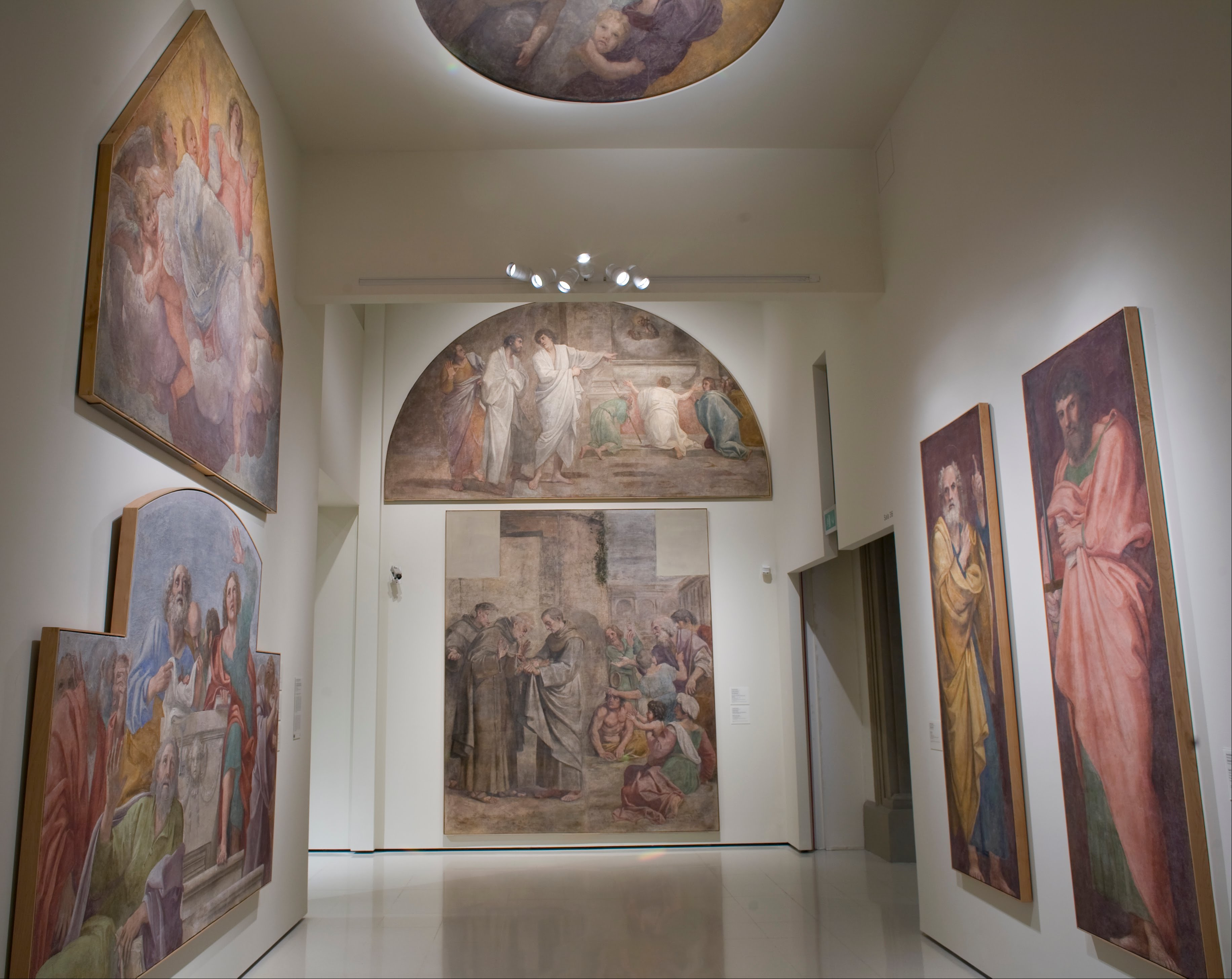
Annibale Carracci and studio, Frescoes of the Herrera chapel, 1605–1606, Museu Nacional d'Art de Catalunya, Barcelona

In the upper register appears Christ in glory seated on a cloud supported by cherubs. On the sides two praying angels frame the scene in the upper part of the panel which stands out against an antique golden background, alluding to the otherworldly dimension of the apparition.

In the lower register, Saint Diego, in a Franciscan habit and in a foreshortened position, moves his right hand towards the head of the little Diego de Herrera, absorbed in prayer, recommending him to the Lord while with his left hand he shows a crucifix to the observer.

The lower register is unanimously considered the qualitatively highest part of the work both with regard to the figure of Diego de Herrera, a notable example of Carracci's skill as a portraitist – to whom even the most dubious positions on the full paternity of the work assign at least the portrait of the boy – and with regard to the broad landscape onto which the scene in the lower part of the painting opens.

The arrangement on two vertical registers is a compositional method already used on other occasions by Annibale Carracci such as in the Coronation of the Virgin (c.1600) created for Pietro Aldobrandini or in the Christ in Glory with Saints (c.1597), created for Odoardo Farnese.

This is a type of composition that harks back to Raphael's Disputa.
