= Del Monte (surname) =

del Monte is a topographic byname/surname literally meaning "from the mountains/mountain".. Notable people with the name include:

- Antonio Maria Ciocchi del Monte (died 1533), Italian bishop and cardinal
- Bryan Del Monte, U.S. Department of Defense deputy director
- Deodat del Monte (1582–1624), Flemish painter, architect, engineer, astronomer
- Domingo del Monte (1804–1853), Cuban writer
- Fabrizio del Monte (born 1980), Italian racing driver
- Francesco Maria del Monte (1549–1627), Italian cardinal
- Gaspar del Monte (1927–1997), Cuban baseball player
- Guidobaldo del Monte (1545–1607), Italian mathematician, philosopher and astronomer
- Ishmael Del'Monte, Bridge player
- Innocenzo Ciocchi Del Monte (c. 1532–1577), Italian cardinal
- María del Monte (born 1962), Spanish singer and TV and radio hostess
- Pietro del Monte (c. 1400 – 1457) Italian jurist, canonist and humanist
- Peter Del Monte (1943–2021), Italian film director and screenwriter
- Ramón del Monte (1925–1990), Dominican baseball player
- Ryan Del Monte (born 1983), Canadian ice hockey player
- Virginia Bourbon del Monte (1899–1945), Italian princess

== See also ==
- Delmonte, surname
- Delmont (surname)
