= Mural paintings from the Herrera Chapel =

Mural paintings by Annibale Carracci

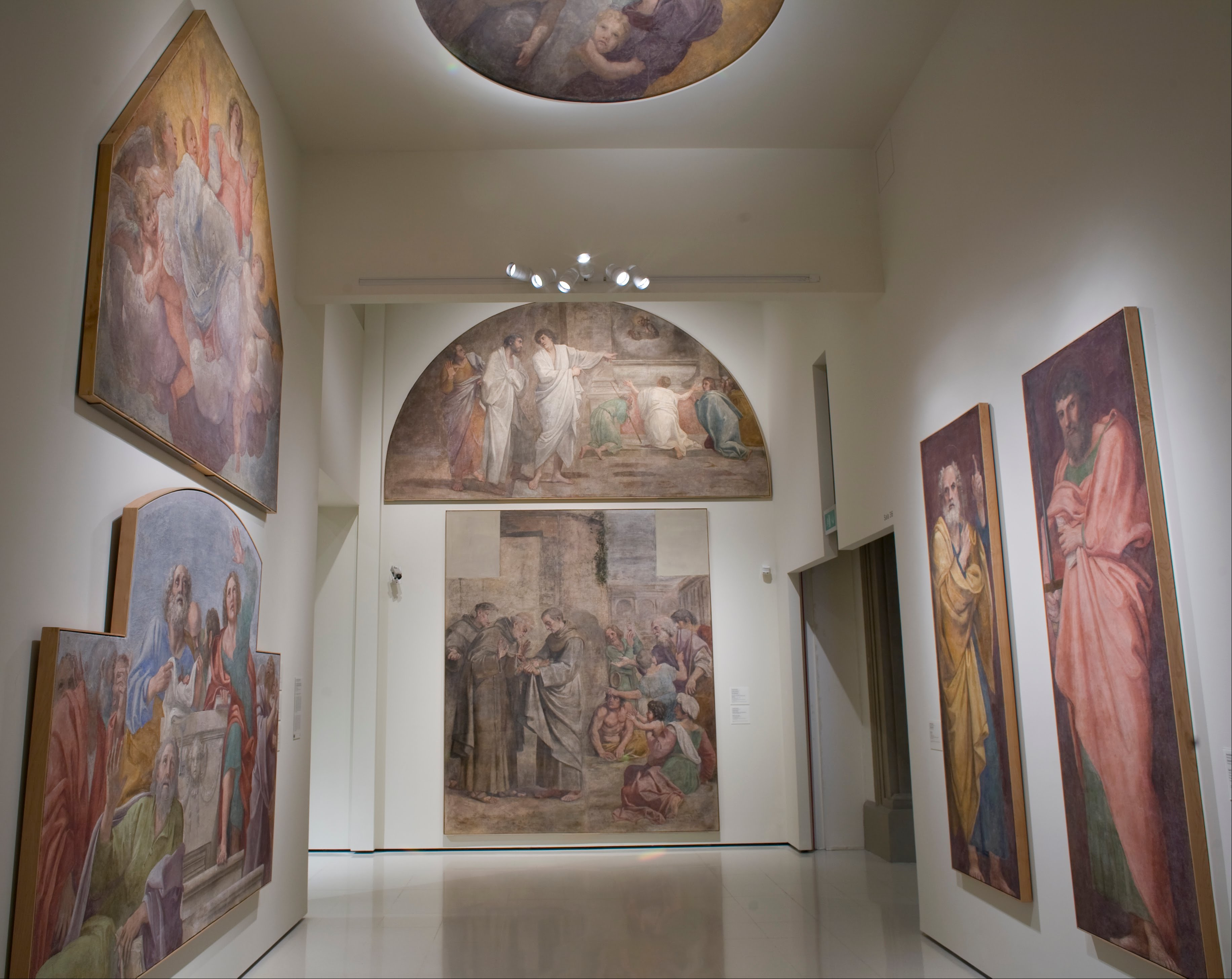
- Artist: Annibale Carracci
- Year: 1604–1606
- Type: Fresco transferred to canvas
- Location: Museu Nacional d'Art de Catalunya & Museo del Prado; Barcelona & Madrid

The mural paintings from the Herrera Chapel are a group of mural paintings by Annibale Carracci and collaborators, of around 1602, now divided between the National Art Museum of Catalonia in Barcelona, and the Museo del Prado in Madrid.

They are frescoes that were painted for a chapel in Rome around 1604, but later transferred to canvas and moved to Spain by 1851.

== History ==
In 1602, the Spanish nobleman Juan Enriquez de Herrera dedicated a chapel to the Spanish Franciscan Saint (Didacus or) Diego de Alcala in what is now Nostra Signora del Sacro Cuore in Rome, but was then "Saint James of the Spanish", the Spanish national church in Rome. He commissioned Saint Didacus of Alcalá Presenting Juan de Herrera's Son to Christ and frescoes from Carracci. The mural decoration, with scenes from the saint's life, was done by the Bolognese painter Annibale Carracci. In 1604, this master began designing all the preparatory cartoons, but he became ill while personally directing the work "in situ". So, the work was finished by his collaborators, who included Giovanni Lanfranco, Sisto Badalocchio and Francesco Albani.

The Spanish national church in Rome later became the new Santa Maria in Monserrato degli Spagnoli, and the old church was cleared of its artworks. The frescoes in the Herrera chapel were transferred to canvas at the request of the sculptor Antonio Solá, at the expense of Ferdinand VII (d. 1833), and arrived in Spain in 1851. They are now distributed between MNAC and Museo del Prado.

== Description ==
The group consists of 16 items, 9 of which are kept at the MNAC and the other 7 at the Museo del Prado in Madrid. From the former church of San Giacomo degli Spagnuoli in Rome.

#	Image	Title	Authors	Museum	Reference
1	Fresco depicting apostles gathered around an empty tomb	Apostles around the Empty Sepulchre	Carracci and Francesco Albani	MNAC	
2	Fresco showing the miracle of roses scene	Miracle of the Roses	Carracci, Francesco Albani and Domenico Zampieri	MNAC	
3	Fresco depicting the Assumption of the Virgin Mary	Assumption of the Virgin	Carracci and Albani	MNAC	
4	Circular fresco of God the Father	Everlasting Father	Carracci and Albani	MNAC	
5	Fresco showing Christ healing a blind man	Healing the Man Born Blind	Carracci and Albani	MNAC	
6	Vertical fresco depicting Saint Paul	Saint Paul	Carracci and Albani	MNAC	
7	Vertical fresco depicting Saint Peter	Saint Peter	Carracci and Albani	MNAC	
8	Fresco showing Saint Didacus preaching	Saint Didacus Preaching	Carracci and Sisto Badalocchio	MNAC	
9	Fresco showing the apparition of Saint Didacus above his tomb	Apparition of Saint Didacus above his sepulchre	Carracci and Sisto Badalocchio	MNAC	
10	Circular fresco showing the apotheosis of Saint Francis	Apotheosis of Saint Francis	Carracci and workshop	Museo del Prado	
11	Circular fresco showing the apotheosis of Saint James the Greater	Apotheosis of Saint James the Greater	Carracci and workshop	Museo del Prado	
12	Circular fresco showing the apotheosis of Saint Lawrence	Apotheosis of Saint Lawrence	Carracci and workshop	Museo del Prado	
13	Fresco showing Saint Didacus receiving alms	Saint Didacus Receiving Alms	Carracci and Albani	Museo del Prado	
14	Fresco showing Saint Didacus receiving the Franciscan habit	Saint Didacus Receiving the Franciscan Habit	Carracci and Albani	Museo del Prado	
15	Fresco depicting the miraculous refection	The Miraculous Refection	Carracci and Albani	Museo del Prado	
16	Fresco showing Saint Didacus saving a boy sleeping in an oven	Saint Didacus Saves the Boy Sleeping in the Oven	Carracci and Albani	Museo del Prado	
