= Palazzo Costaguti =

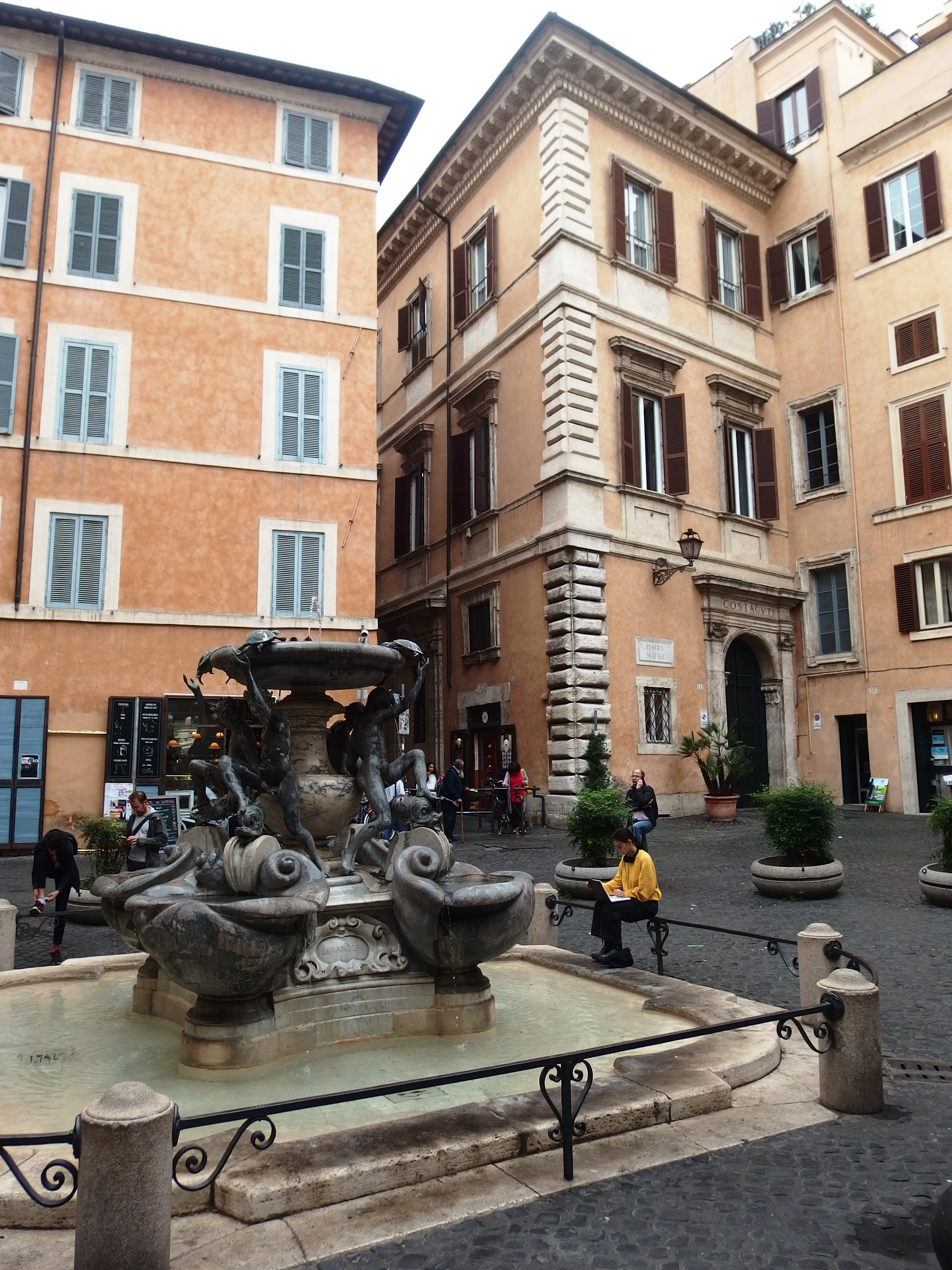
- The facade on Piazza Mattei and today's main portal of Palazzo Costaguti, on the right
- Interactive map of the Palazzo Costaguti area
- Alternative names: Palazzo Patrizi Costaguti

General information
- Status: In use
- Type: Palace
- Architectural style: Mannerist
- Location: Rome, Lazio, Italy, 10, Piazza Mattei
- Coordinates: 41.89375°N 12.477389°E
- Construction started: 16th century
- Completed: 16th century

Palazzo Costaguti, also known as Palazzo Patrizi Costaguti, is a mannerist architecture Roman, located at the corner of Piazza Mattei with Via della Reginella, in rione Sant’Angelo in Rome.

Large in size, it also runs along Via dei Falegnami and its rear facades are in Piazza Costaguti. Currently used as the seat of the Universitas Telematica Mercatorum.

== History ==
The palace was built in the first half of the 16th century for Monsignor Constanzo Patrizi, treasurer of Pope Paul III, on the site of the demolished Church of San Leonardo de Albis, itself built on the site of an ancient Roman temple.

In 1578, with the death of Patrizi. The building was sold to Ascanio and Prospero Costaguti, members of a Ligurian banking family, for 26,000 scudi. In the early 17th century, the Costaguti family became treasurers for Pope Paul V Borghese, responsible for the construction of St. Peter's Basilica, to which the family's prelate, Cardinal Giovanni Battista Costaguti.

During this period, Costaguti renovated the building to a design by Carlo Lambardi (1597–1619): while the oldest wing of the building faces Via della Reginella, with a beautiful portal that was once the main entrance, a new entrance was opened in Piazza Mattei, in front of the famous Fountain of the Turtles; the façade here is attributed to Ascanio de Rossi, while the one in Piazza Costaguti is said to be by Antonio De Battistis.

In 1823, the entrance (which had become rear) was incorporated into the Ghetto of Rome and the Costaguti family closed the gateway, starting to use the portal in Piazza Mattei as their main entrance. In the course of the century, new renovations were made by Giovanni Battista Giovenale, continued when the Costaguti family merged with the Afan De Rivera, a noble family of Hispano-Napolitan origin. Since then, the building still belongs to the marquises Afan De Rivera Costaguti; the family has other properties in various parts of Italy — the most important of which is the Palazzo Costaguti in Roccalvecce, near Viterbo — and came to be related to the Florio of Sicily by marrying Giulia Florio, from their marriage a woman Costanza Afan de Rivera Costaguti was born.

During World War II, Marquis Achille Belloso Afan De Rivera, a lifelong fascist and an officer of the Militia, during the persecutions in Rome gave shelter to many Jews in his palace: during the rastrellamento del Ghetto, "in an officer's uniform, he blocked the Germans at the doorway who wanted to enter the palace", probably to capture those who had taken refuge there from the Piazza Costaguti door to exit through the other door.

== Description ==
=== Exterior ===
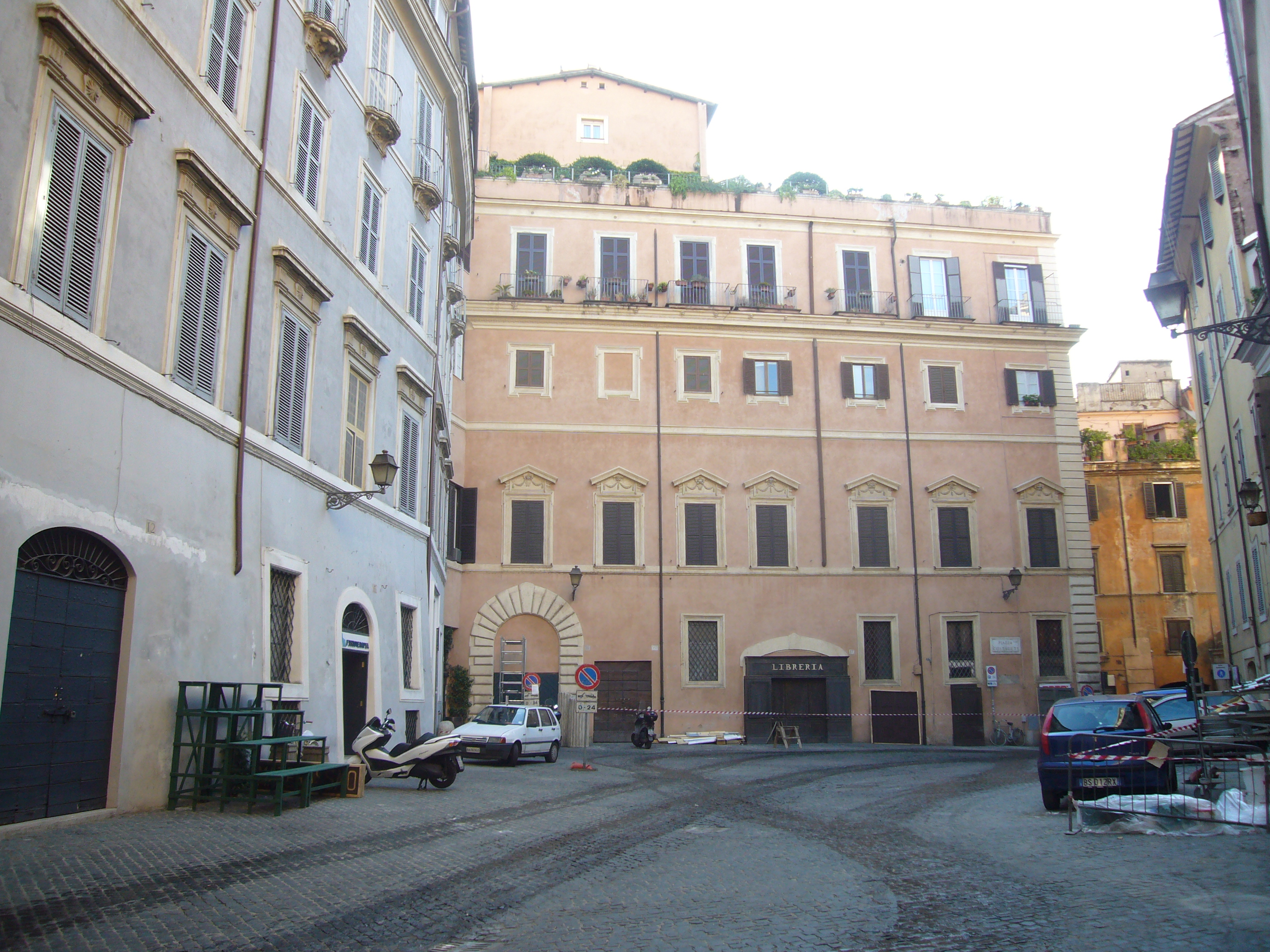
The façade of the palace on Piazza Costaguti, in the centre in pink, with the old main portal transformed into a shop

The façade on Piazza Costaguti has two floors of windows, the first with architraves and triangular festoons and the second with cornices. At the eaves, with mixed lines, is a 19th-century raised floor with small balconies with iron balustrades.

On the ground floor is a beautiful portal of rusticated ashlars between modern doors and windows. On the corners is a decoration of rusticated stone blocks from the floor to the eaves, just like the façade of Piazza Mattei, whose portal, the main entrance to the palace, is surmounted by an architrave with the inscription COSTAGUTI.

A side façade of the palace, still in Piazza Costaguti, faces the Tempietto del Carmelo, dedicated to Our Lady of Mount Carmel.

The inner courtyard was renovated in the 21st century to restore its 16th-century appearance. The coat of arms of the Costaguti family, three pointed lines indicating three stars, is depicted everywhere.

=== Interior ===
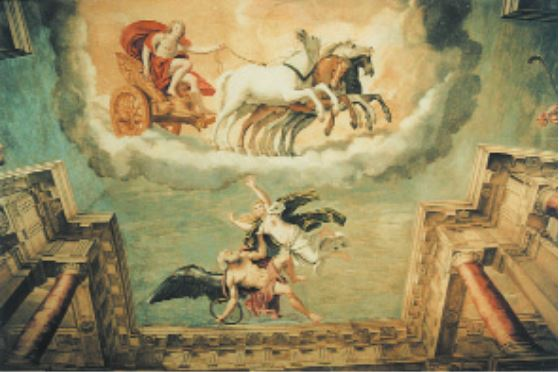
A fresco with the Chariot of Apollo and The Time Revealing the Truth by Domenichino on a vault of the piano nobile. The quadratures are by Tassi.

The interior of the palace is richly decorated with frescoes.

The piano nobile, where members of the Costaguti family still live, retains its original decoration, including numerous masterpieces. These include frescoes by Raffaele Romanelli (mythological painting), Guercino (ceiling of the Hall of Rinaldo and Armida, done together with Agostino Tassi), the brothers Taddeo and Federico Zuccari (Hall of the Months) and Gaspard Poussin. Among the large paintings, the most famous are probably the Chariot of the Sun and Time Discovering Truth, by Domenichino (also done with the help of Tassi), and Room of Venus. Also of note are works by Francesco Albani (Rape of Europa), the brothers Giacomo and Pierfrancesco Mola (Bacchus and Ariana) and Giovanni Lanfranco and Sisto Badalocchio (Hall of Hercules).

A grand staircase, richly decorated and with steps made of two types of marble (Carrara and peperino), connects all the floors. Statues of the Costaguti's ancestors (Ascanio and Prospero) and a marble bench (used for resting those who used to climb the stairs in the past) can still be seen on the stairs.

== Bibliography ==
=== Italian sources ===
- Ausenda, Marco (2002). Roma Milano: Touring Club Italiano. p. 491. ISBN 88-365-2541-5.
