= Delmonte =

Delmonte is a topographic byname/surname literally meaning "from the mountains/mountain". Notable people with the surname include:

- Armand Delmonte (1927–1981), Canadian ice hockey player
- Francine DelMonte, American politician
- Ishmael Del'Monte, Australian bridge player
- Nicolás Delmonte (born 1989), Argentine footballer

== See also ==
- del Monte (surname)
- Delmont (surname)
