= Office of Detainee Affairs =

The Office of Detainee Affairs was created by the United States Department of Defense in July 2004.

Bryan Del Monte served as deputy director for policy development and international issues in the Office of Detainee Affairs.
