= Delmont (surname) =

Delmont is a topographic byname/surname literally meaning "from the mountains/mountain". Notable people with the surname include:

- Andy Delmont (born 1985), Australian cricketer
- Édouard Delmont (1883–1955), French actor
- Joseph Delmont (1873–1935), Austrian film director
- Matt Delmont, American historian
- Mike Delmont (born 1940), American politician and law enforcement officer

== See also ==
- Delmonte, surname
- del Monte (surname)
