= De Porta =

De Porta is a topographic byname/surname literally meaning "by the gate". Notable people with the name include:

- Benveniste de Porta
- Hugo de Porta Ravennate
