= Bryan Del Monte =

American government official

Bryan Del Monte was the United States Department of Defense's deputy director for policy development and international issues in the Office of Detainee Affairs.

Del Monte left the Department of Defense in late 2007 and worked for the consulting firm Booz Allen Hamilton, Inc.

Presently, he is the President of Del Monte Agency and works as an advertising executive.
