= Sisto Badalocchio =

Italian painter

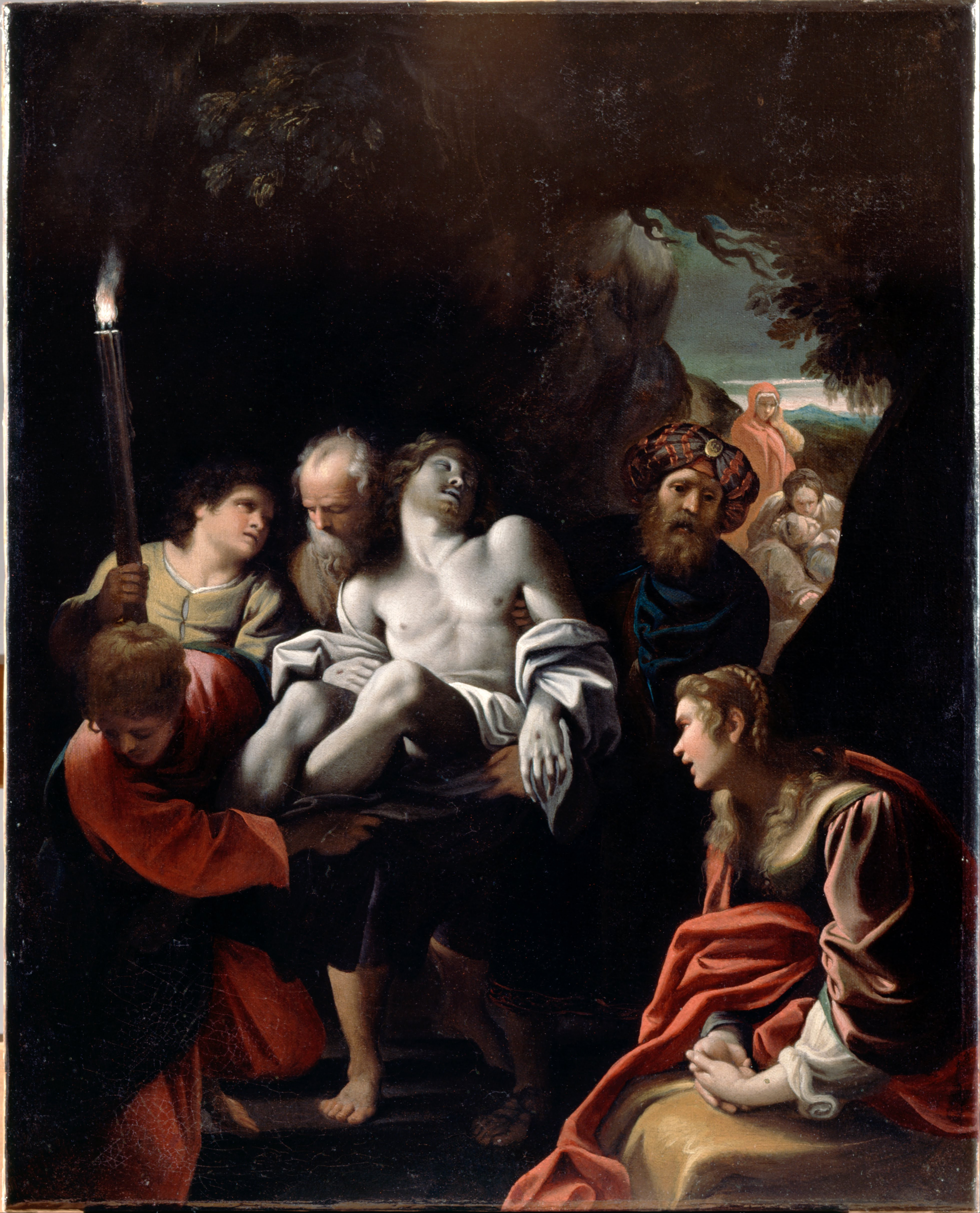
- Christ Carried to the Tomb, Dulwich Picture Gallery, c. 1607
- Born: 28 June 1585; Parma
- Died: c. 1619-1647 (aged 33–62) (sources vary); Parma
- Known for: Painting and engraving
- Movement: Baroque

Sisto Badalocchio Rosa (28 June 1585 – c. 1619-1647) was an Italian Baroque painter and engraver of the Bolognese School.

== Biography ==
Born in Parma, he worked first under Agostino Carracci in Bologna, then Annibale Carracci, in Rome. He worked with Annibale till 1609, then moved back to Parma. His best known work as an engraver was the Raphael's Bible series, which he created together with his fellow student, Giovanni Lanfranco. The images depict a series of frescoes by Raphael's workshop in the Vatican loggias.

As a painter, his most important work are the frescoes in the church of San Giovanni Evangelista, Reggio Emilia, which are based on Correggio's earlier works. In this church, he executed the decoration of the dome and pendentives. The dome fresco represents the parousia, i.e. the second coming of Christ, while the pendentives are adorned by the four cardinal virtues.

Though he often cooperated in fresco painting with Lanfranco, for example in Annibale-designed series the San Diego Chapel in San Giacomo degli Spagnoli (1602–1607) and in Palazzo Costaguti (Nessus and Deianeira), Badalocchio never received the same recognition as his peer. Nevertheless, he is recognized today as an important figure in bringing the artistic styles of the Italian Baroque to northern Italy. Badalocchio died in Bologna around 1647.

== Gallery ==
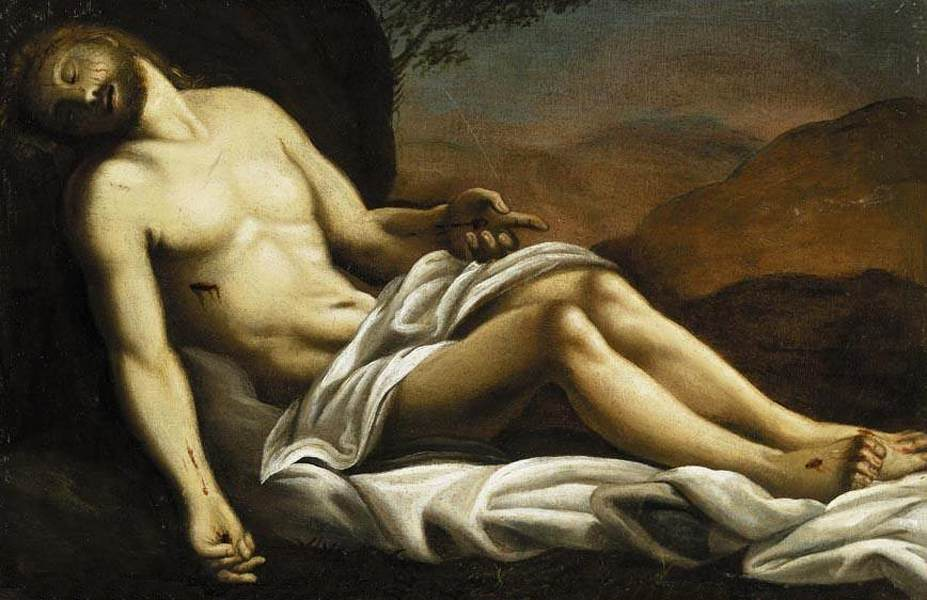
Dead Christ

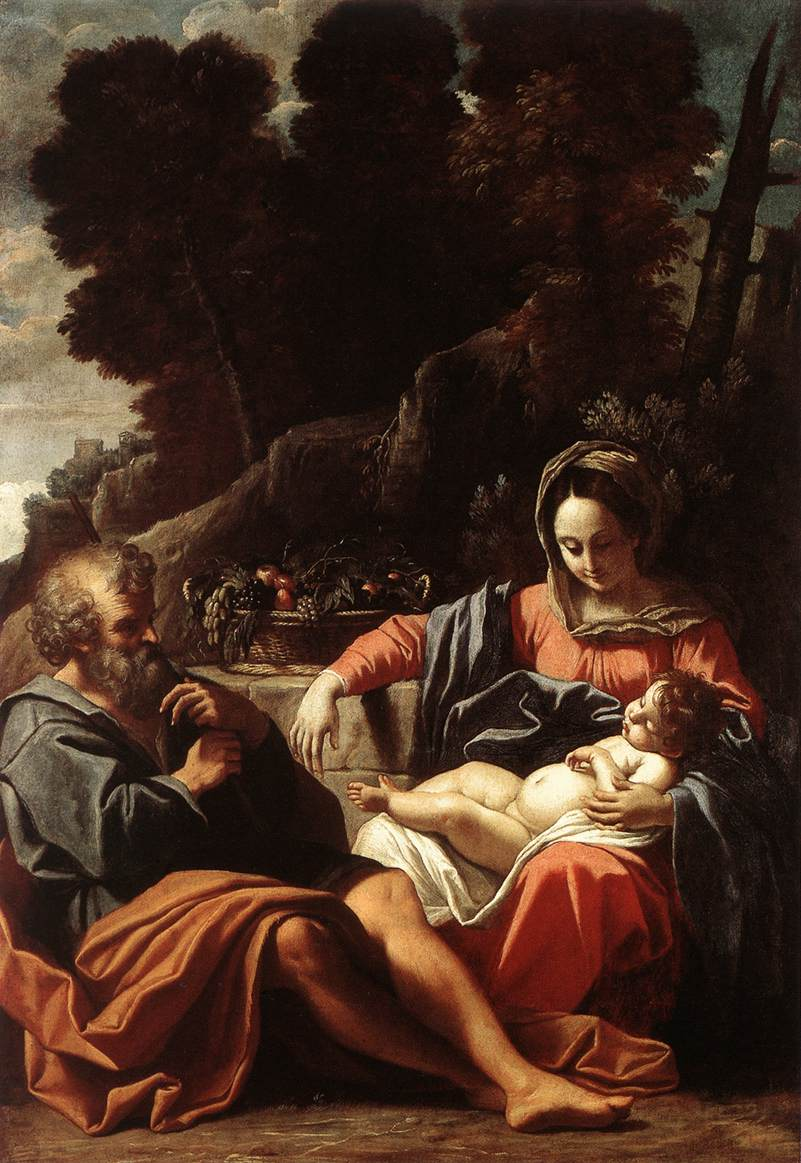
Holy Family

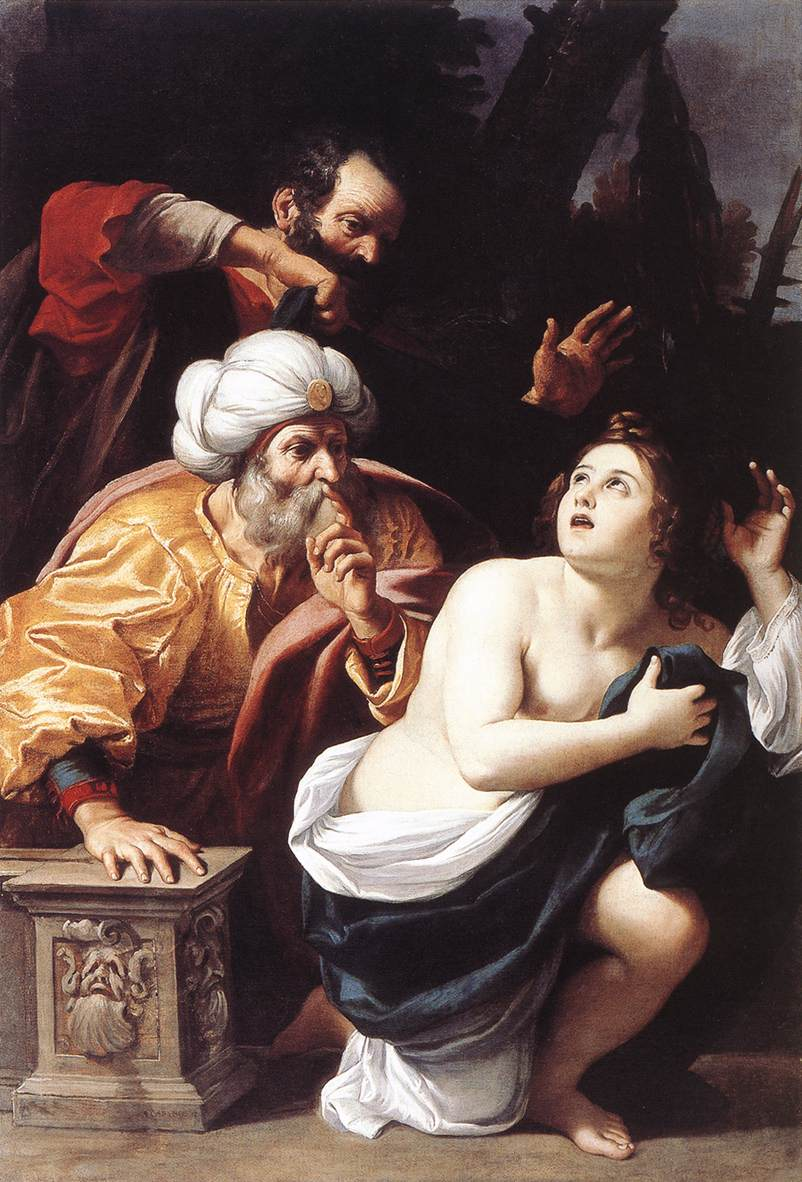
Susanna and the Elders

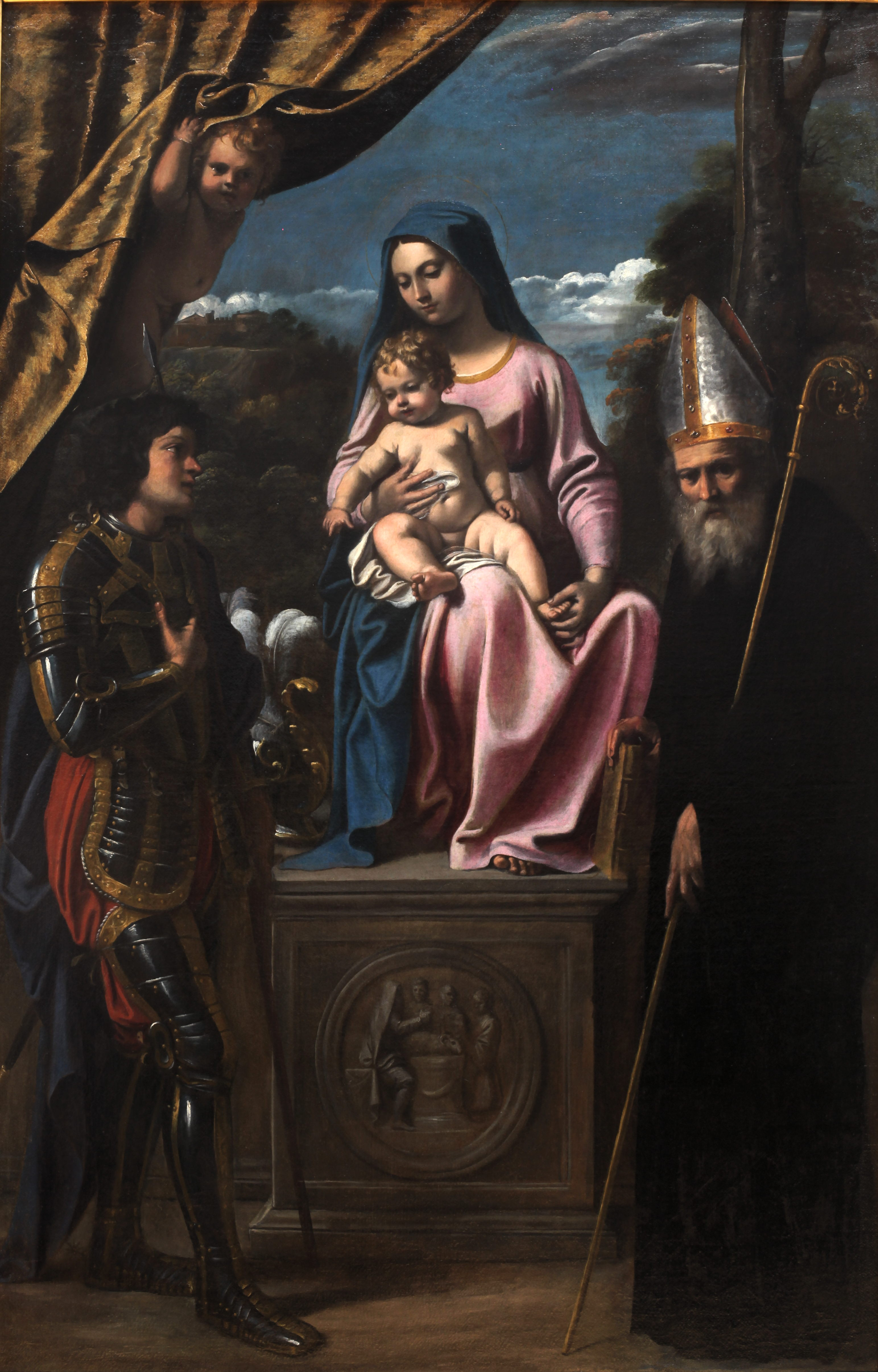
Virgin and Child between St Benedict and St Quentin

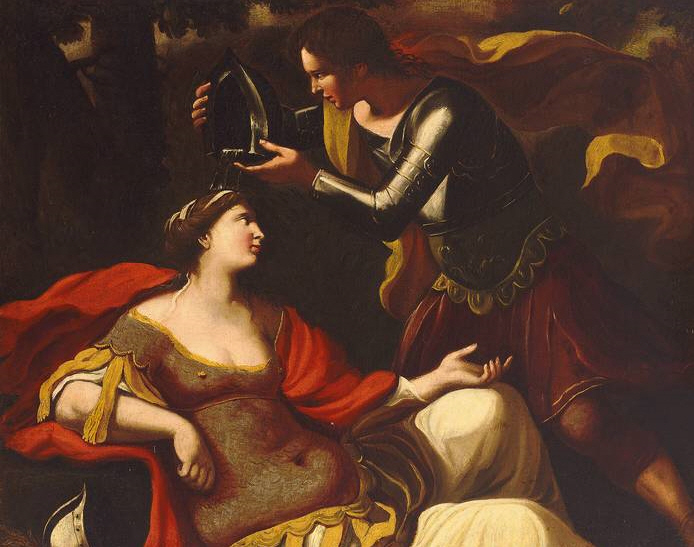
Tancred and Clorinda

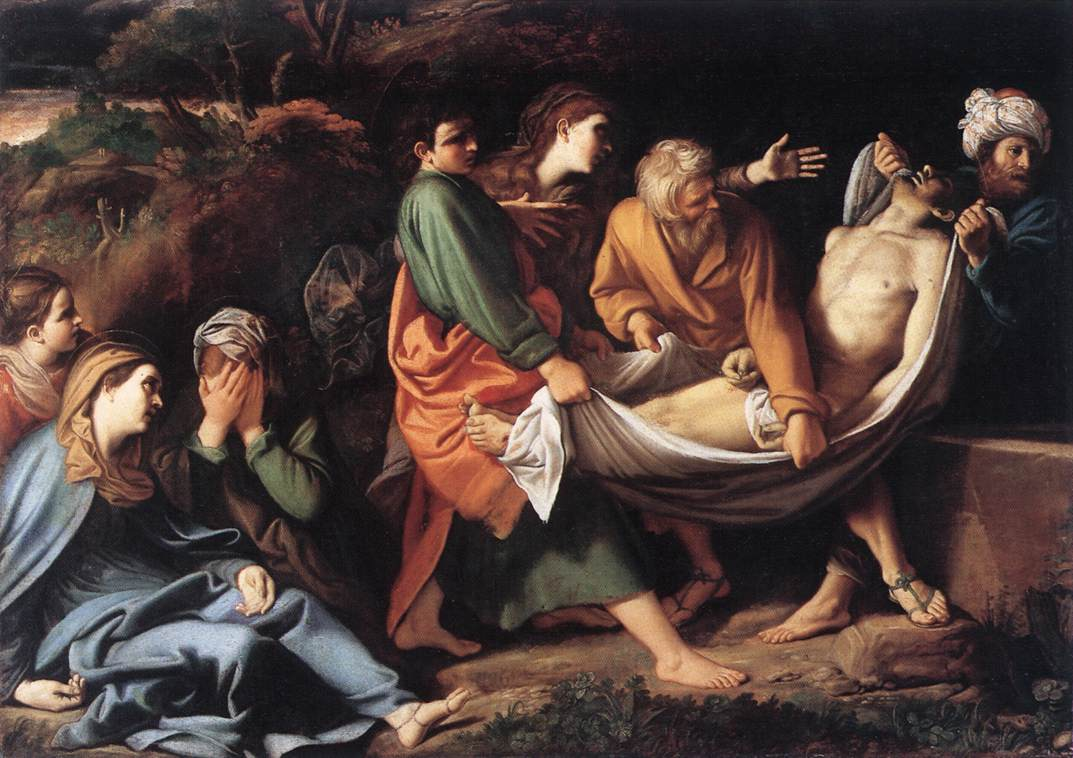
The Entombment of Christ

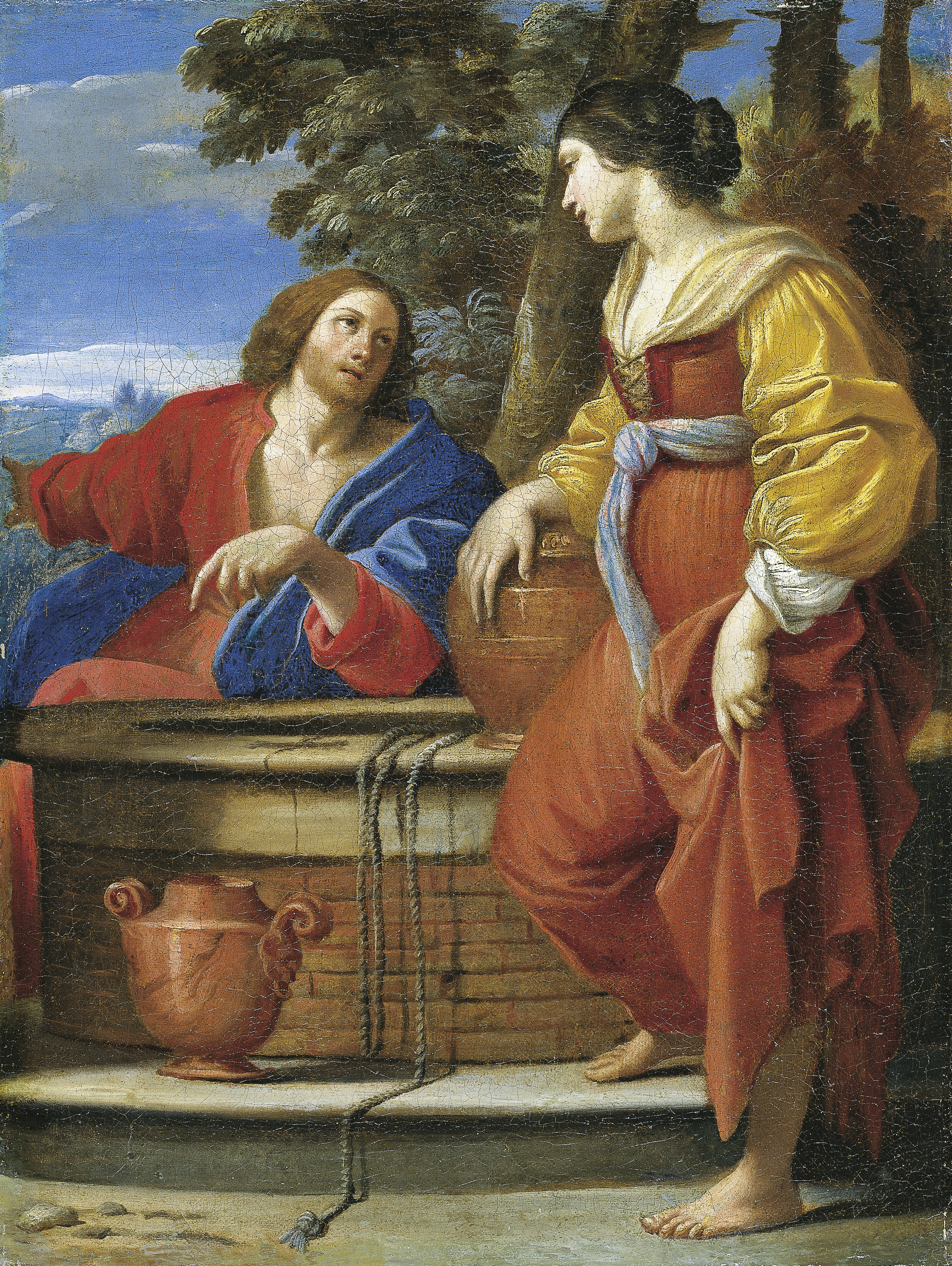
Christ with the Samaritan Woman at the Well

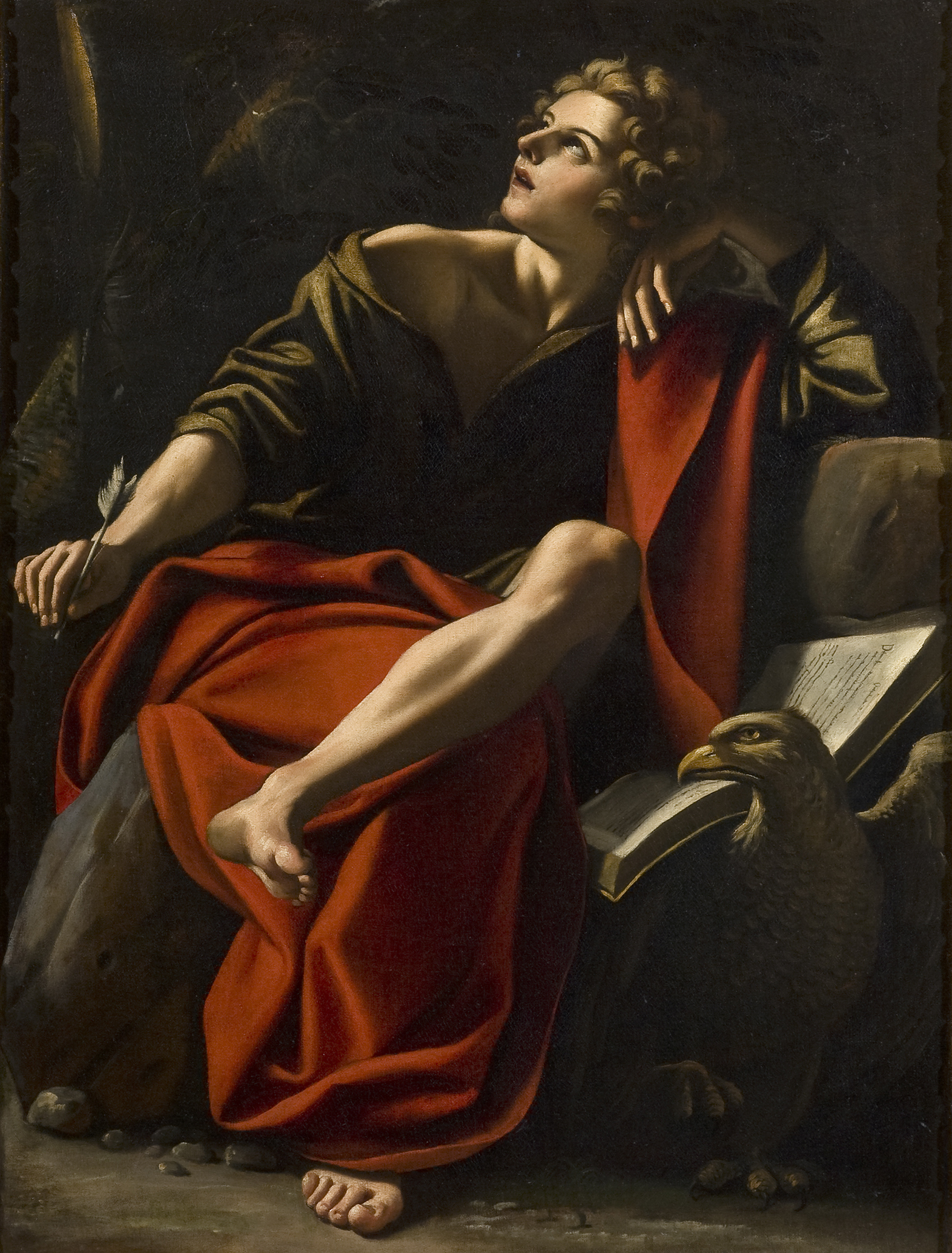
St. John the Evangelist

== Bibliography ==
- Gilbert, Creighton (1963). "BADALOCCHIO, Sisto". Dizionario Biografico degli Italiani (in Italian). Vol. 5: Bacca–Baratta. Rome: Istituto dell'Enciclopedia Italiana. OCLC 883370.
- Francis P. Smyth; John P. O'Neill, eds. (1986). The Age of Correggio and the Carracci: Emilian Painting of the 16th and 17th Centuries. Washington DC: National Gallery of Art. pp. 373–378.
- Wittkower, Rudolf (1993). Art and Architecture Italy, 1600-1750. 1980. Penguin Books. pp. 78, 80, 82–83.
