= Marie Lopez del Puerto =

Mexican and American physicist

- Education: Universidad de las Américas Puebla; University of Minnesota
- Awards: American Physical Society Excellence in Physics Education Award, 2023; Fellow of the American Physical Society, 2023
- Scientific career
- Fields: Condensed matter physics
- Workplaces: University of St. Thomas
- Doctoral advisor: James R. Chelikowsky

Marie Lopez del Puerto is a condensed matter physicist whose research concerns the computational study of the electronic, optical, and quantum properties of nanocrystals and nanostructures. As a physics educator, she has worked to integrate computational physics into the undergraduate physics curriculum. Educated in Mexico and the US, she works in the US as a professor of physics and chair of the physics department at the University of St. Thomas, a private Catholic university in Minnesota.

== Education and career ==
Lopez del Puerto earned a licenciatura in Physics from the Universidad de las Américas Puebla in Mexico in 2002. She began her work in physics education that year, teaching physics at a local college for a term between the end of her undergraduate and the beginning of her graduate program. She went to the University of Minnesota for graduate study in physics, earning a master's degree in 2004 and completing her Ph.D. there in 2008, supervised by James R. Chelikowsky. Chelikowsky moved to the Oden Institute for Computational Engineering and Sciences at the University of Texas at Austin in 2005, and Lopez del Puerto continued to work with him there, but earned her degree through the University of Minnesota.

She became a faculty member at the University of St. Thomas in 2008.

== Recognition ==
Lopez del Puerto was a 2023 recipient of the Excellence in Physics Education Award of the American Physical Society (APS), for her work with the Partnership for Integrating Computation into Undergraduate Physics, a multi-university physics education project which she joined in 2012. She was named a Fellow of the American Physical Society in 2023, after a nomination from the APS Forum on Education, "for impactful work on integrating computation into the physics curriculum, for leadership in the Partnership for Integrating Computation into Undergraduate Physics, and for service to the American Physical Society and the American Association of Physics Teachers".
