= Diego del Puerto =

Spanish music theorist

Diego del Puerto (fl. early 16th century) was a Spanish music theorist. He was active at Salamanca, where he studied and later became cantor of the Colegio Mayor de S Bartolomé and curate at the church of Laredo. His only known work is the treatise Portus musice (Salamanca, 1504), which discusses numerous topics from the theory of genera to the vihuela tuning system. The treatise is particularly notable for a very thorough explanation of the rules of composition in three and four parts, and for del Puerto's criticism of the Guidonian hexachordal theory, possibly showing influence of Bartolomé Ramos de Pareja.
