= Francisco de Castello =

Italian painter

Francisco de Castello (1556–1636) was an Italian painter of the late-Renaissance. He was born in Flanders, of Spanish parentage. He visited Rome, for the purpose of study, when quite young, during the papacy of Gregory XIII. He painted historical pictures, generally small in size, which were much sought after. He also executed some pictures for the churches at Rome. In the church of San Giacomo degli Spagnuoli is an altarpiece of the Assumption of the Virgin with Glory of Angels and Apostles and a Madonna & Child with Sts. Nicholas and Julian for the church of San Rocco di Ripetta. He died at Rome.
