= Ramón Aldana del Puerto =

Mexican politician

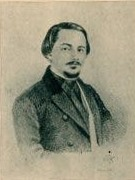
- Born: June 30, 1833
- Died: August 16, 1882 (aged 49)
- Occupation: Writer

Ramón Aldana del Puerto (June 30, 1833 – August 16, 1882) was a Mexican journalist, playwright, lawyer, and politician.

Ramón Aldana del Puerto was born on June 30, 1833 in Mérida, Yucatán. He studied law and philosophy but became known for his work as a journalist and politician. He served as a Deputy in the Congress of the Union and a magistrate on the High Court of Justice of Yucatán and Veracruz. He wrote for numerous publications, including La Prensa, El País, El Pensamiento, La Guirnalda, El Álbum Yucateco, and La Biblioteca de Señoritas. He and his cousin Manuel Aldana Rivas co-founded the publication La Revista de Mérida in 1869 and sold it in 1873. Aldana published four plays: "Honor y felicidad," "Nobleza de corazón," "Una prenda de venganza," and "La cabeza y el corazón", the latter two of which were published in La Revista de Mérida.

Ramón Aldana del Puerto died on August 16, 1882, in Mexico City.
