= Pietro del Monte =

Pietro del Monte (Petrus de Monte Brixensis; c. 1400 – 1457) was a Venetian jurist, canonist and humanist.

He studied at the University of Padua, as a student of Prodocimo de Conti and Giovan Francesco di Capodilista. He was papal collector in England from 1435 to 1440. Subsequently, he was papal legate to France. He became Bishop of Brescia in 1442.

== Works ==
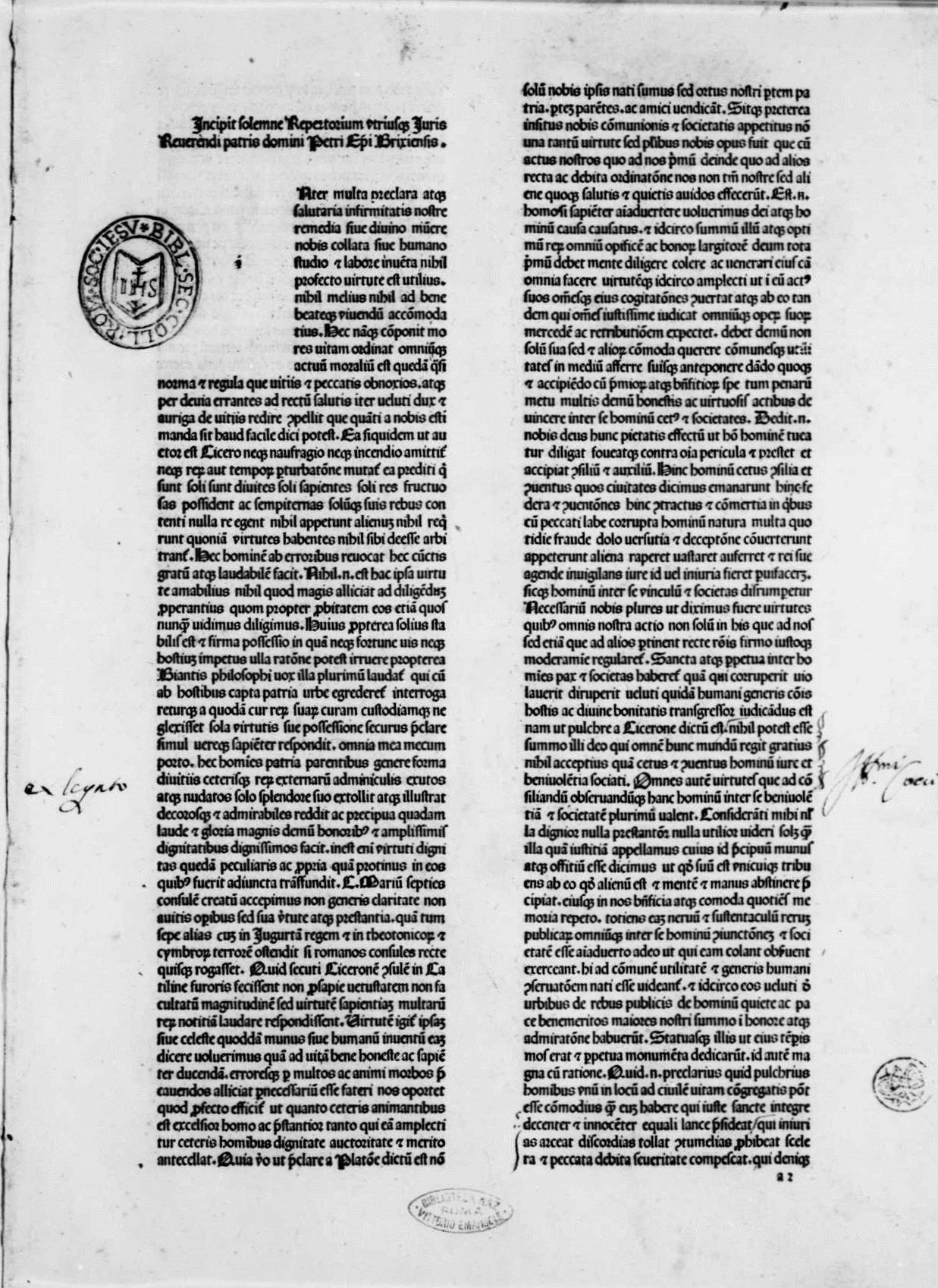
Repertorium utriusque iuris, 1480

- Monarchia in qua generalium conciliorum materia de potestate prestantia & excellentia Romani pontificis & imperatoris plenissime discutitur , Lugduni, 1512, Romae 1537
- De unius legis veritate et sectarum falsitate opus utilissimum & perspicacissimum, Mediulanum, 1522.
- Repertorium utriusque iuris (in Latin). Bologna. 1475.
  - Repertorium utriusque iuris (in Latin). Padua: Johann Herbort. 1480.
- De potestate romani pontificis et generalis concilii, (composed 1434, printed Rome, 1476)
- De Vitiorum inter se Differentia (composed 1438, unprinted), plagiarised from De Avaritia by Poggio Bracciolini
