= Santa Maria in Monserrato degli Spagnoli =

Church of Holy Mary in Monserrato of the Spaniards
- Santa Maria in Monserrato degli Spagnoli (in Italian); Santa María de Montserrat de los Españoles (in Spanish); S. Mariae Hispanorum in Monte Serrato (in Latin)
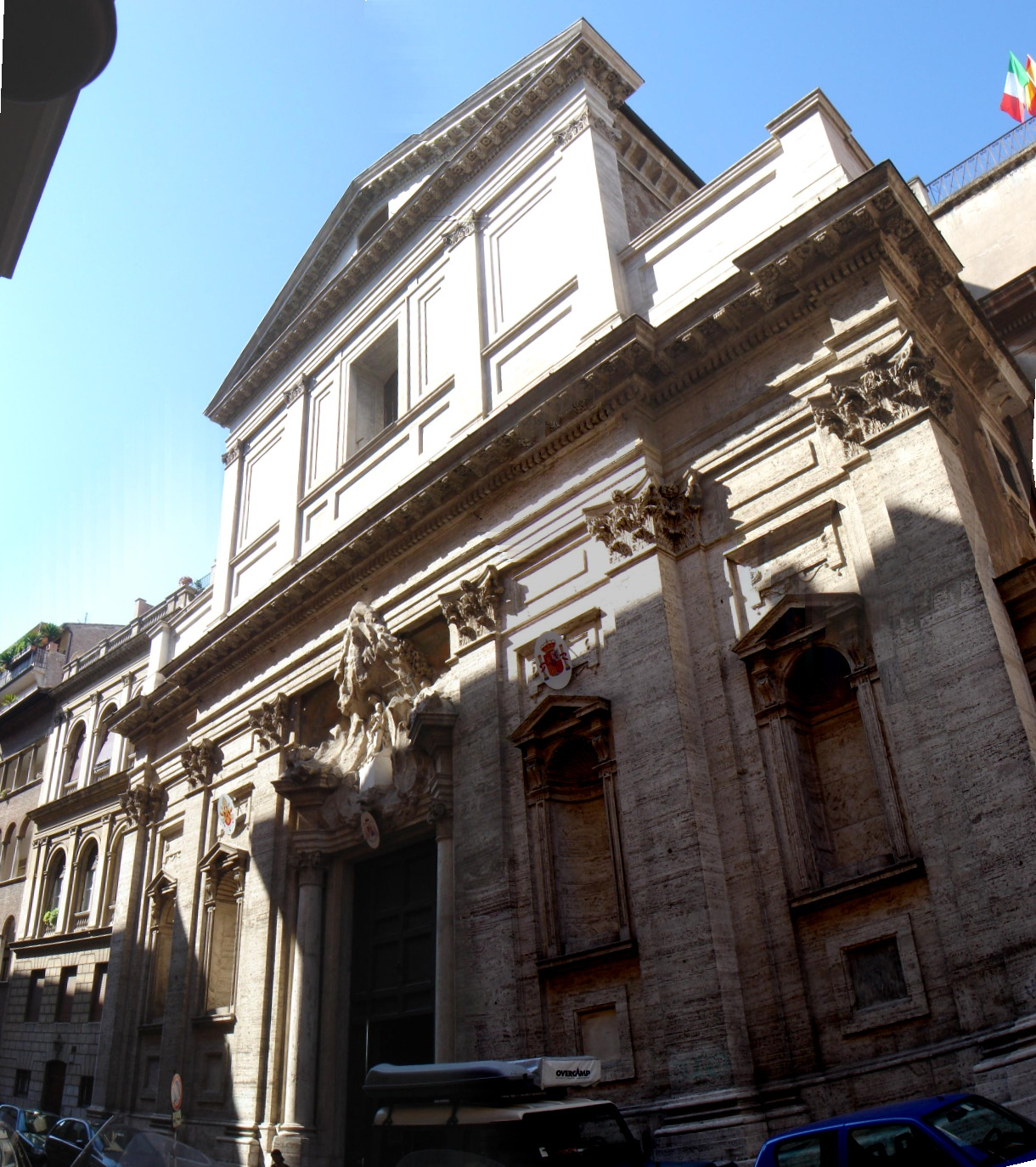
- Façade of the Church of Saint Mary of Monserrat of the Spaniards, National Church in Rome of Spain.
- Click on the map for a fullscreen view
- 41°53′45.40″N 12°28′08.69″E
- Location: Rome
- Country: Italy
- Denomination: Roman Catholic
- Website: Official website

History
- Status: Rectory church, titular church, Spanish national church
- Dedication: Our Lady of Montserrat
- Consecrated: 1594

Architecture
- Architect(s): Antonio da Sangallo the Younger, Bernardino Valperga, Francesco da Volterra
- Architectural type: Church
- Style: Baroque
- Completed: 1598

Specifications
- Length: 40 metres (130 ft)
- Width: 14 metres (46 ft)

The Spanish National Church of Santiago and Montserrat, known as Church of Holy Mary in Monserrat of the Spaniards (Italian: Santa Maria in Monserrato degli Spagnoli, Spanish: Santa María de Montserrat de los Españoles, Latin: S. Mariae Hispanorum in Monte Serrato) is a Roman Catholic titulus church and National Church in Rome of Spain, dedicated to the Virgin of Montserrat. It is located in the Rione Regola, at the intersection of the alleyway Via della Barchetta and the narrow Via di Monserrato, with the facade on the latter street, about three blocks northwest of the Palazzo Farnese.

It was established as titular church in 2003. The current Cardinal Priest of the Titulus S. Mariae Hispanorum in Monte Serrato is José Cobo Cano.

== History ==
San Giacomo degli Spagnoli was erected in 1450 on the site of an earlier church. By 1506 it was the location of two hospices for Spanish pilgrims and the national church of the Crown of Castile in Rome.

Santa Maria in Monserrato degli Spagnoli was founded in 1506 when the Brotherhood of the Virgin of Montserrat in Catalonia built a hospice for Spanish pilgrims. It served as the national church and hospital for the Aragonese community in Rome.

When Santa Maria in Monserrato degli Spagnoli was completed in the 17th century, the focus of the community shifted to that church. San Giacomo degli Spagnoli was in poor repair, and many of the furnishings and artworks were transferred to Santa Maria in Monserrato, which is now the Spanish national church. San Giacomo degli Spagnoli was later deconsecrated and the building sold to the Missionaries of the Sacred Heart.

== Architecture ==
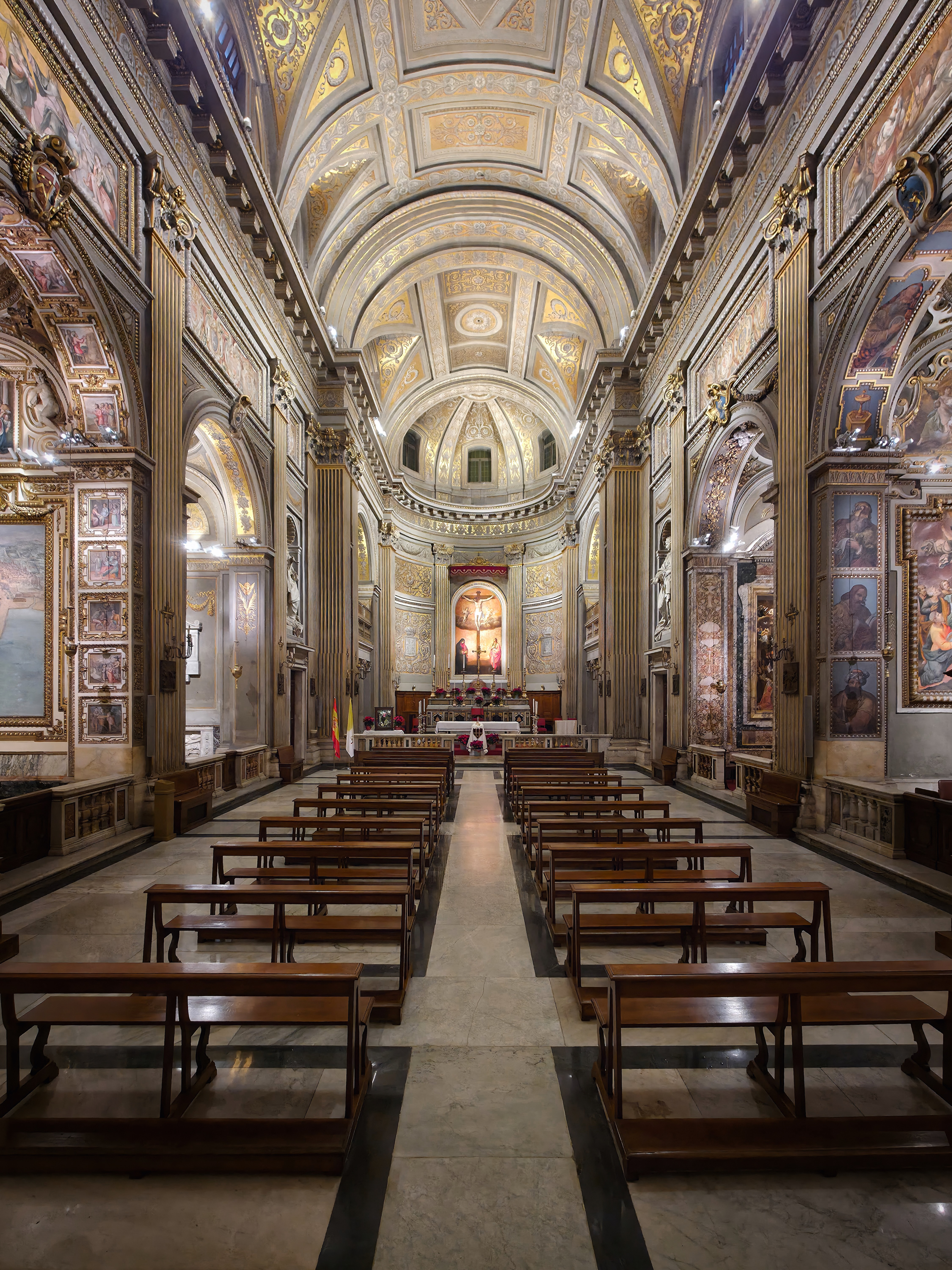
Church nave

The church was built in 1518 according to designs by Antonio da Sangallo the Younger. Construction was interrupted due to lack of funds, but the work proceeded over centuries under the direction, among others, of Bernardino Valperga and Francesco da Volterra. The façade by da Volterra being erected 1582–1593, the altar consecrated in 1594, and the roof finished in 1598. The apse was completed only in 1675, when a new main altar was consecrated. The external sculptural group (1673-1675) was executed by Giovanni Battista Contini. A complete renovation took place from 1818 to 1822; another restoration occurred in 1929.

== Interior ==
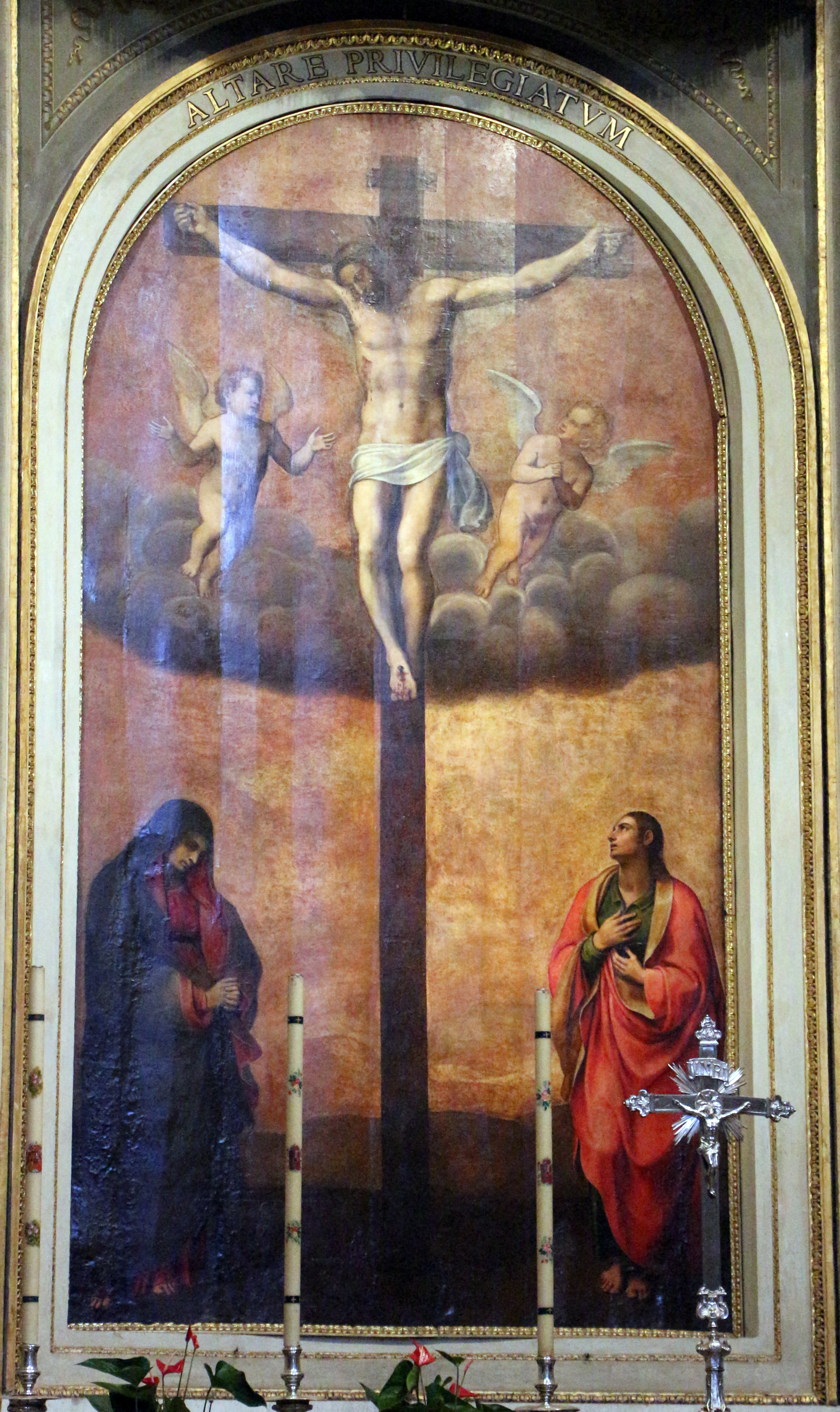
Crocifissione, Girolamo Siciolante da Sermoneta

The altarpiece over the main altar is The Crucifixion (1564-1565), by Girolamo Siciolante da Sermoneta. Funded by Prince Philip of Spain it was moved from San Giacomo degli Spagnoli.

The three chapels on the right side were built between 1582 and 1588; those on the left between 1592 and 1594. The vault of the nave was erected between 1596 and 1598. That of the apse, between 1673 and 1675, under the direction of the Roman architect Giovanni Battista Contini. In the niches above the lateral doors are statues of two Aragonese saints (1816), St. Isabel of Portugal and St. Peter Arbués, by the sculptor Juan Adán. The entire interior was renovated by Giuseppe Camporese between 1818 and 1821, when the high altar was also built. The high altar was consecrated in 1954.

=== Chapel of San Diego de Alcalá ===
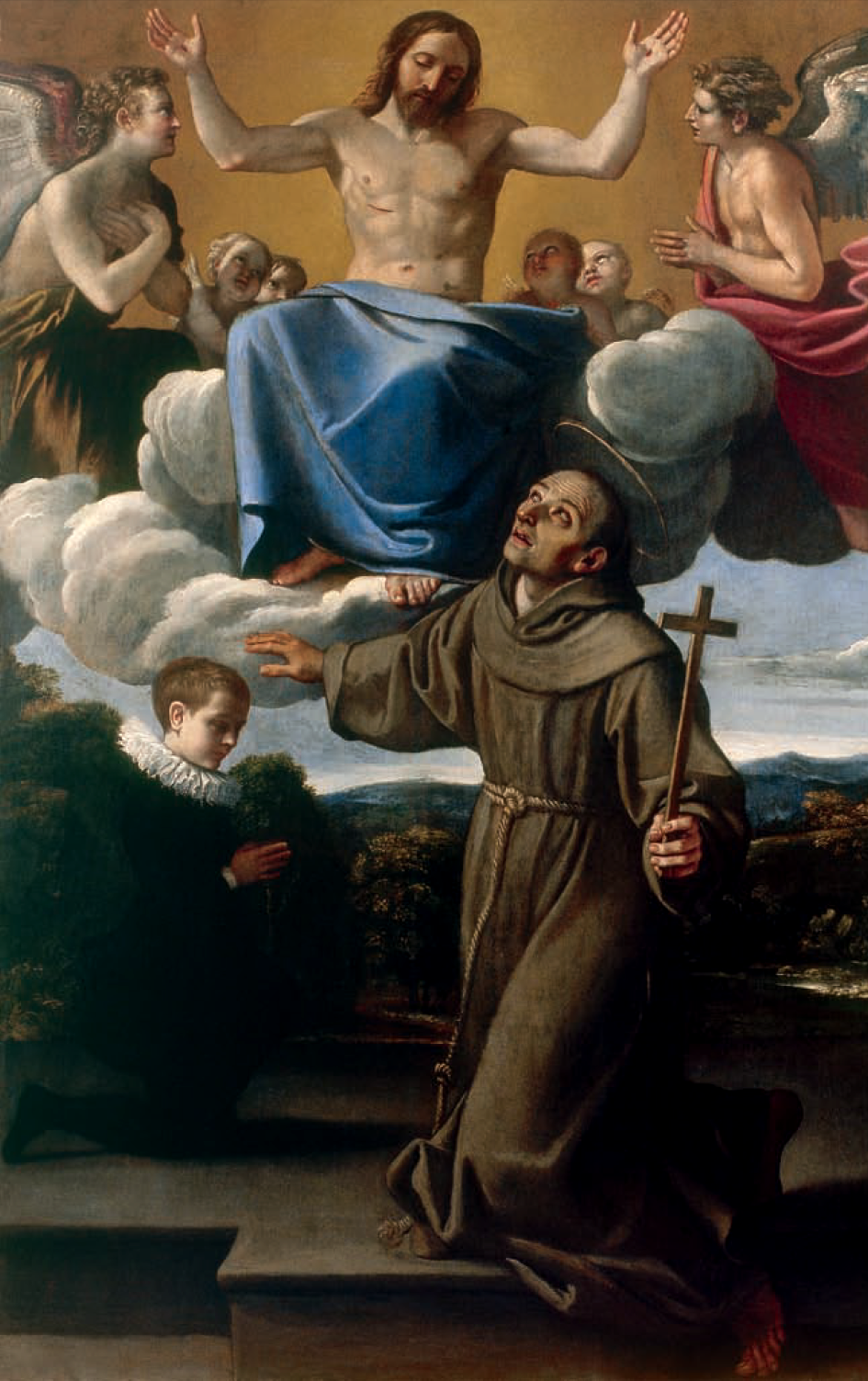
San Diego di Alcalà, Annibale Carracci

The first chapel on the right, dedicated to San Diego de Alcalá, contains a burial plaque of Cardinal Bernardino Rocci (died 1599) on the pavement with his heraldic shield on the ceiling. The altarpiece depicting San Diego di Alcantara was painted by Annibale Carracci. At the right is the mausoleum of two popes from the Spanish Borgia family, Callixtus III (1455-1458) and Alexander VI (1492-1503), sculpted by Felipe Moratilla, and completed only in 1889. The remains of both were transferred from the Vatican thanks to the permission granted by Pope Paul V. Below is the cenotaph of the deposed King of Spain, Alfonso XIII (died 1941), whose remains were repatriated in 1980 to the Pantheon of the Kings at El Escorial. On the left, high up, is the neo-classical, sepulchral monument of the sculptor Antonio Solá (1787-1861), made by José Vilches in 1862, and below the monument for Francisco de Paula Mora, son of the Marchesi di Lugros, who died in Naples in 1842.

=== Chapel of the Annunciation ===
The second chapel on the right contains the burial plaque of the patron Gabriel Ferrer (died 1607), as well as his heraldic shield on the ceiling. The fresco of the Dormition of the Virgin (1683) is by Francesco Nappi, as is the Annunciation altarpiece. The sides have frescoes of the Birth of Mary and Assumption of Mary to Heaven. Two Spanish Ambassadors are buried here: Julián Villalba (died 1843) and Salvador Cea Bermúdez (died 1852). The four lunettes have angels with symbols alluding to the Virgin, and one lunette with Meeting of Mary and Elisabeth. Above the arches and pilasters are Marian symbols and the cupola has the image of St. Cecilia; the tympanum has a God the Father.

=== Chapel of the Virgen del Pilar ===
The third chapel on the right is dedicated to the Virgen del Pilar. The rich polychrome marble decoration completed in the 18th century by Antonio Francés and Miguel de Cetina, based on designs by a canon from Barcelona, Francisco Gómez García, (died 1778). The altarpiece depicting Our Lady of the Pillar with St James and St Vincent Ferrer was painted by Francisco Preciado de la Vega. At the right, an Assumption of Mary (1551) was painted by Francesco di Città di Castello while a Triumph of the Immaculate Conception (1663) on the left, was painted by Louis Cousin.

=== Chapel of Santa Ana ===
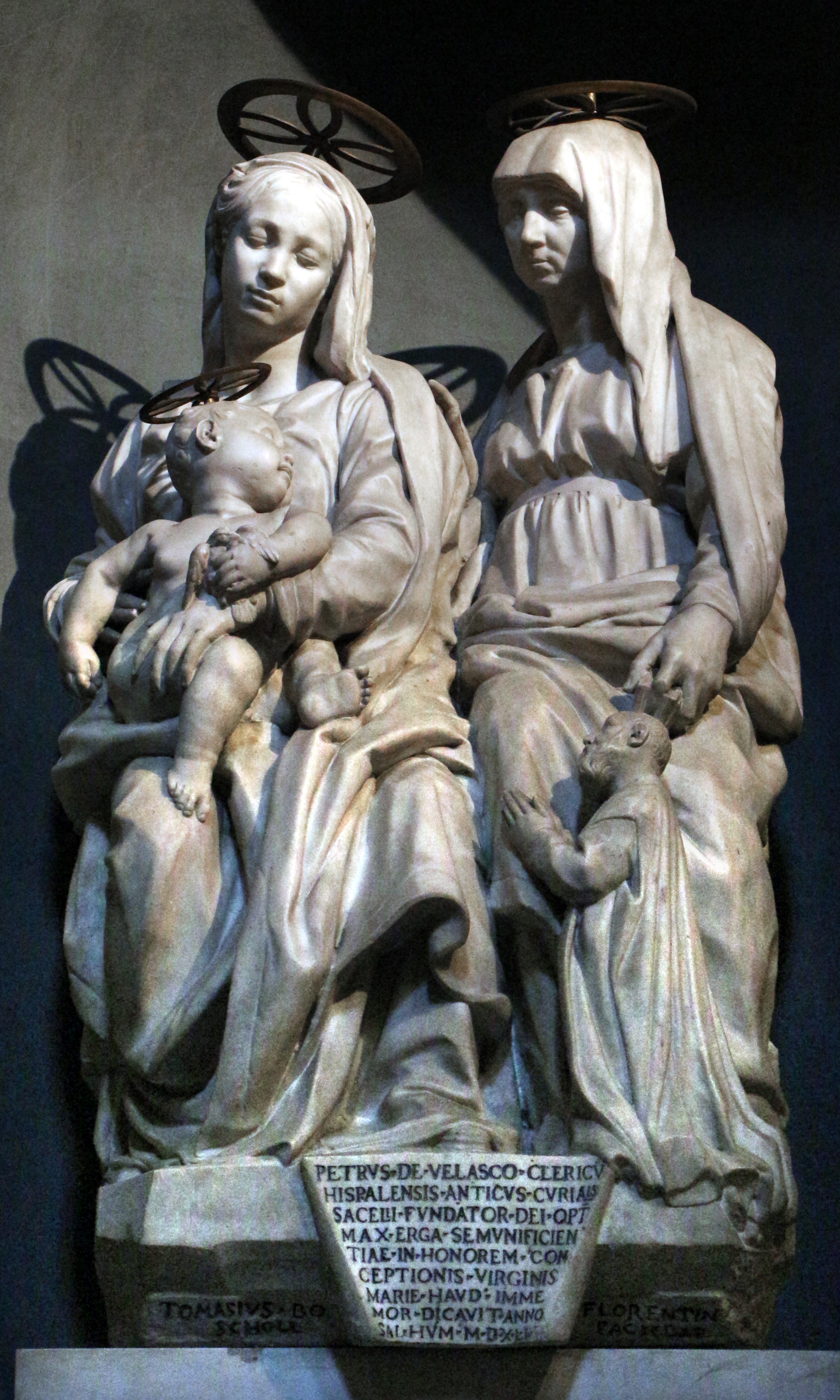
Madonna col bambino e sant'anna, Tommaso Boscoli,

In the first chapel to the left, the statues of Anne, Virgin, and Jesus was sculpted in 1544 by Tommaso Boscoli. The right column has a Tabernacle of Saints attributed to the Milanese Luigi Capponi. On the right wall, stands the Neoclassical monument to the former Spanish ambassador José Narciso Aparici Soler, who died in Rome in 1845.

=== Chapel of Santa María de Montserrat ===
The second chapel on the left is dedicated to the Virgin of Montserrat, and has a modern copy of the image by Manuel Martí Cabrer. The lateral walls are frescoed with the Glory of Saint Raymond of Peñafort and an allegorical Sacred mountain. The four evangelists on the arches and the frescoed Coronation of the Virgin (1627) are attributed to Giovanni Battista Ricci. The 18th century stuccowork is by Carlo Francesco Bizzaccheri.

=== Chapel of Santiago el Mayor ===
The third chapel on the left is dedicated to St. James the Great. The chapel was commissioned by the family of Francisco Robuster (died 1570). It contains a copy of the statue of St James by Jacopo Sansovino, commissioned by Cardinal Jaume Serra i Cau (died 1517) for his chapel in San Giacomo degli Spagnoli. The framing conch were added in the 19th century. The sepulchral monuments of Félix Aguirre (died 1832), José Álvarez Bouguel (1805-1830), and of the ambassador of Spain Antonio Vargas Laguna (died 1824) were completed by Antonio Solá. On the left is the tomb of Bishop Alfonso de Paradinas and on right, the tomb of the bishop of Terni, and secretary to Pope Alexander VI, Juan de Fuensalida (died 1498), both attributed to the work of Andrea Bregno.

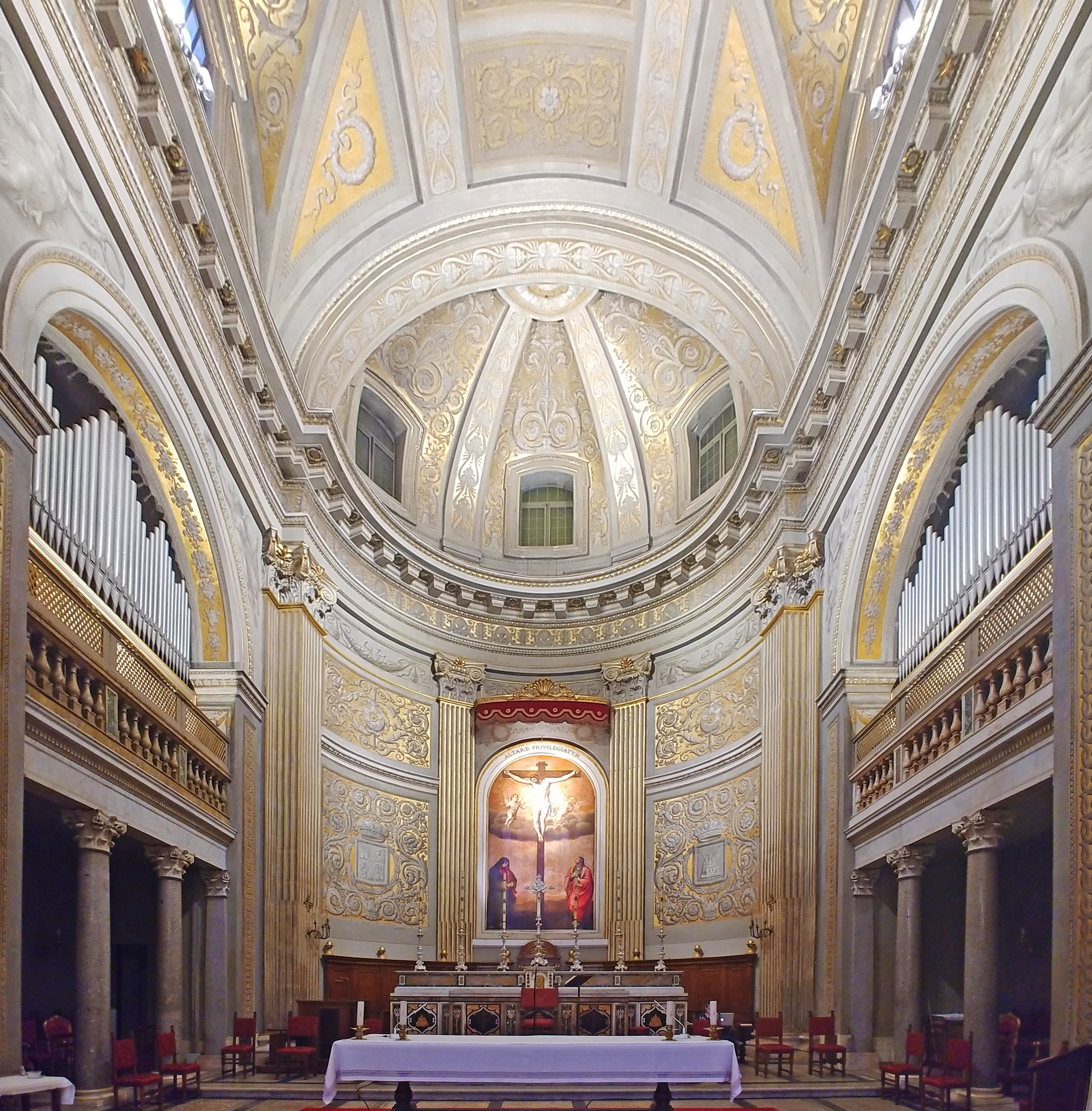
Main altar

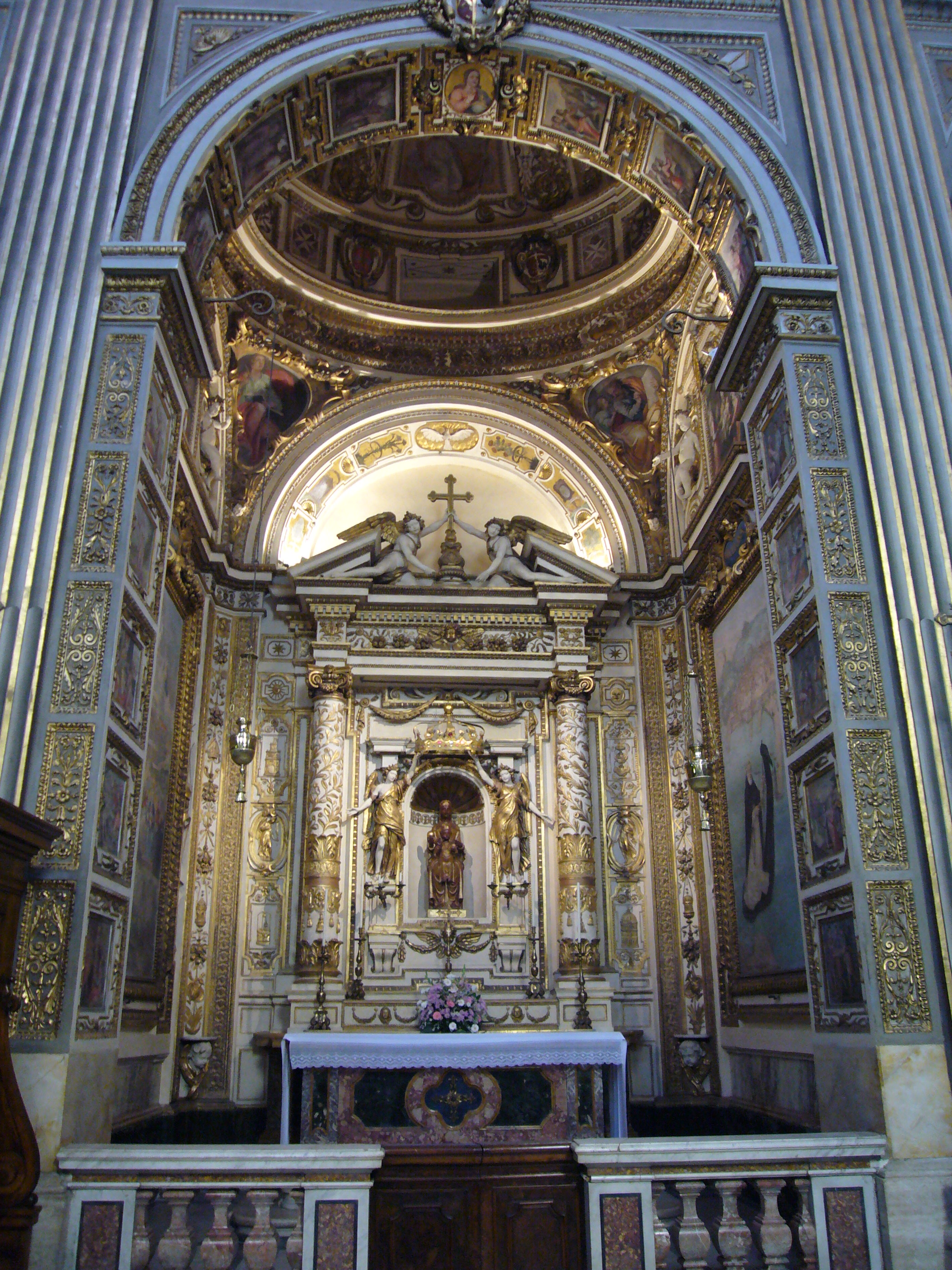
Chapel of Our Lady of Monserrat

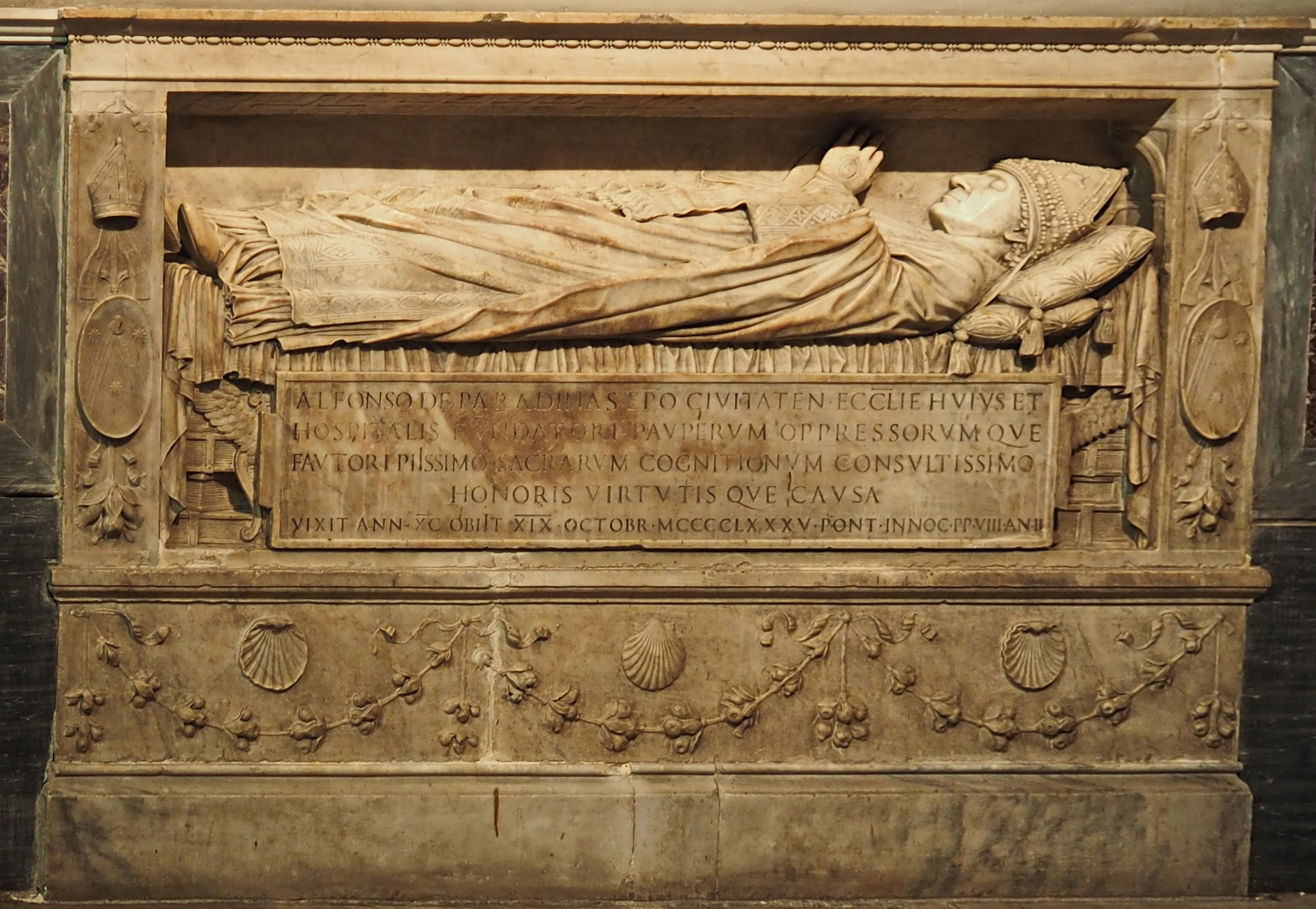
Funeral monument of Bishop Paradinas

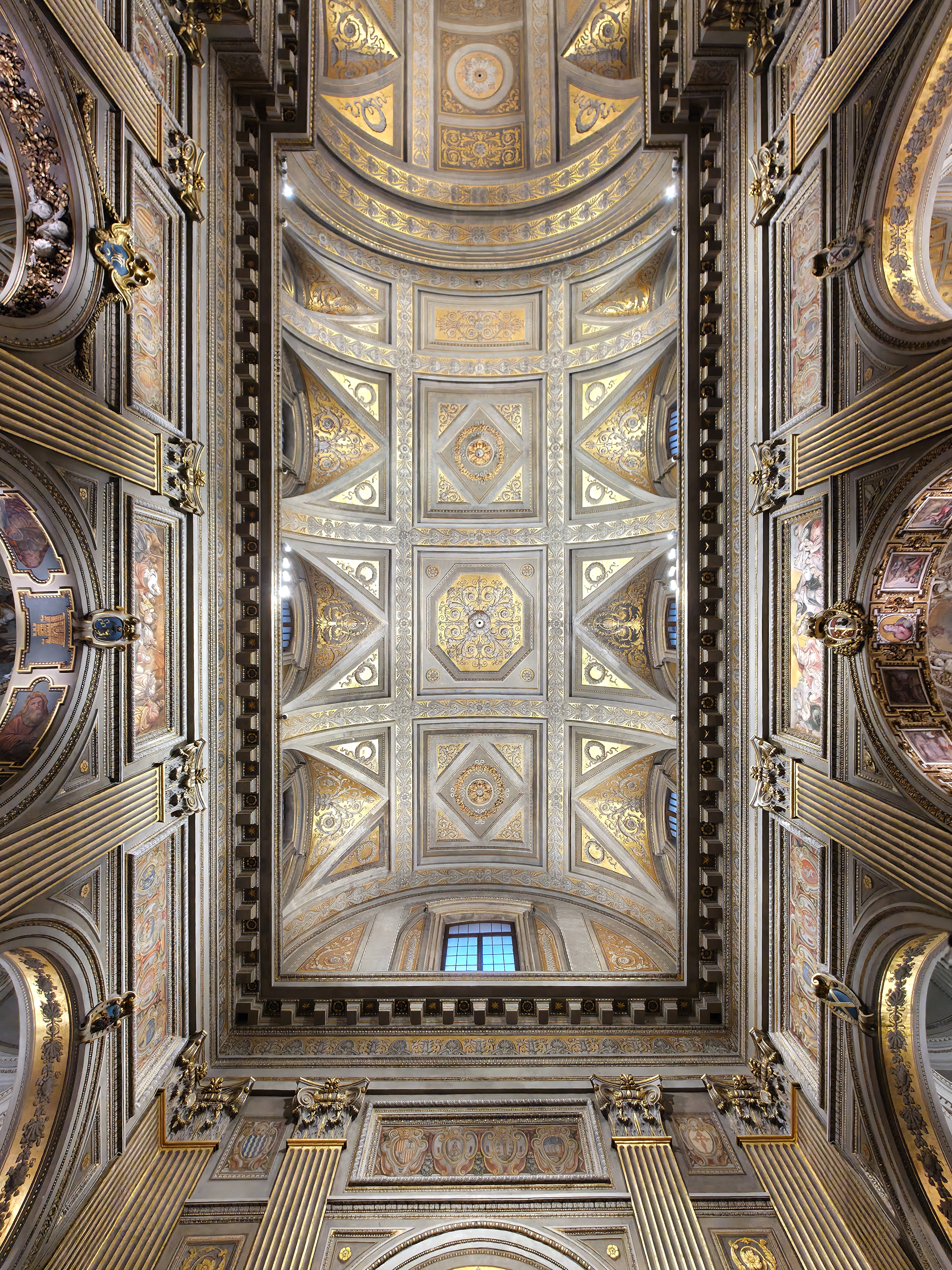
Ceiling

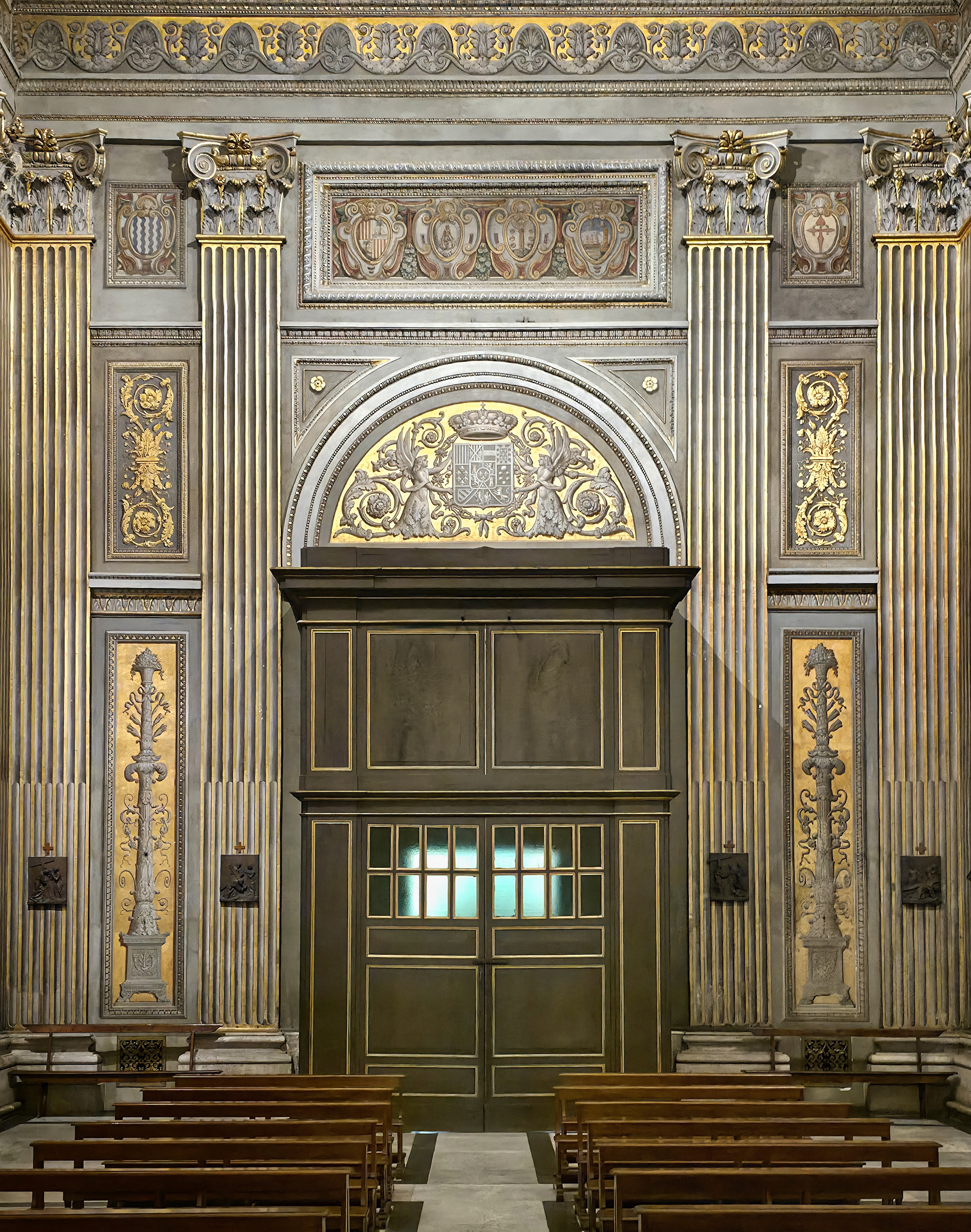
Entrance

== Burials ==
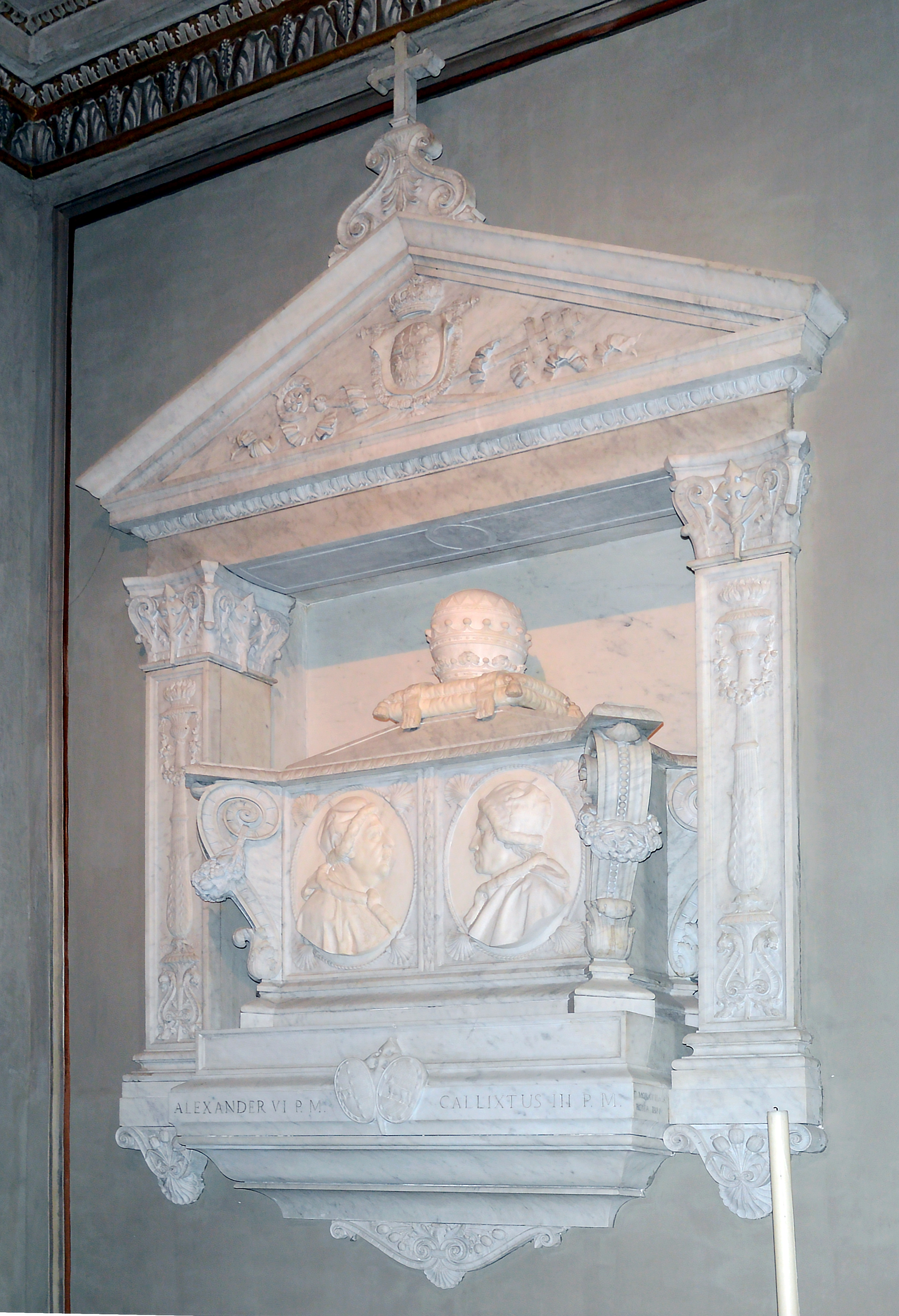
The Borja tomb

- Fernando de Córdoba
- Pope Alexander VI
- Alfonso XIII of Spain (remains transferred to the El Escorial in 1980)
- Pope Callixtus III

== Cardinal-priests of Holy Mary in Monserrato of the Spaniards since 2003 ==
- Carlos Amigo Vallejo (21 October 2003 – 27 April 2022†)
- José Cobo Cano (30 September 2023 – present)
