= Nostra Signora del Sacro Cuore =

Catholic church in Piazza Navona, Rome, Italy

- Church of Our Lady of the Sacred Heart
- San Giacomo degli Spagnoli, Santiago de los Españoles
- Chiesa di Nostra Signora del Sacro Cuore
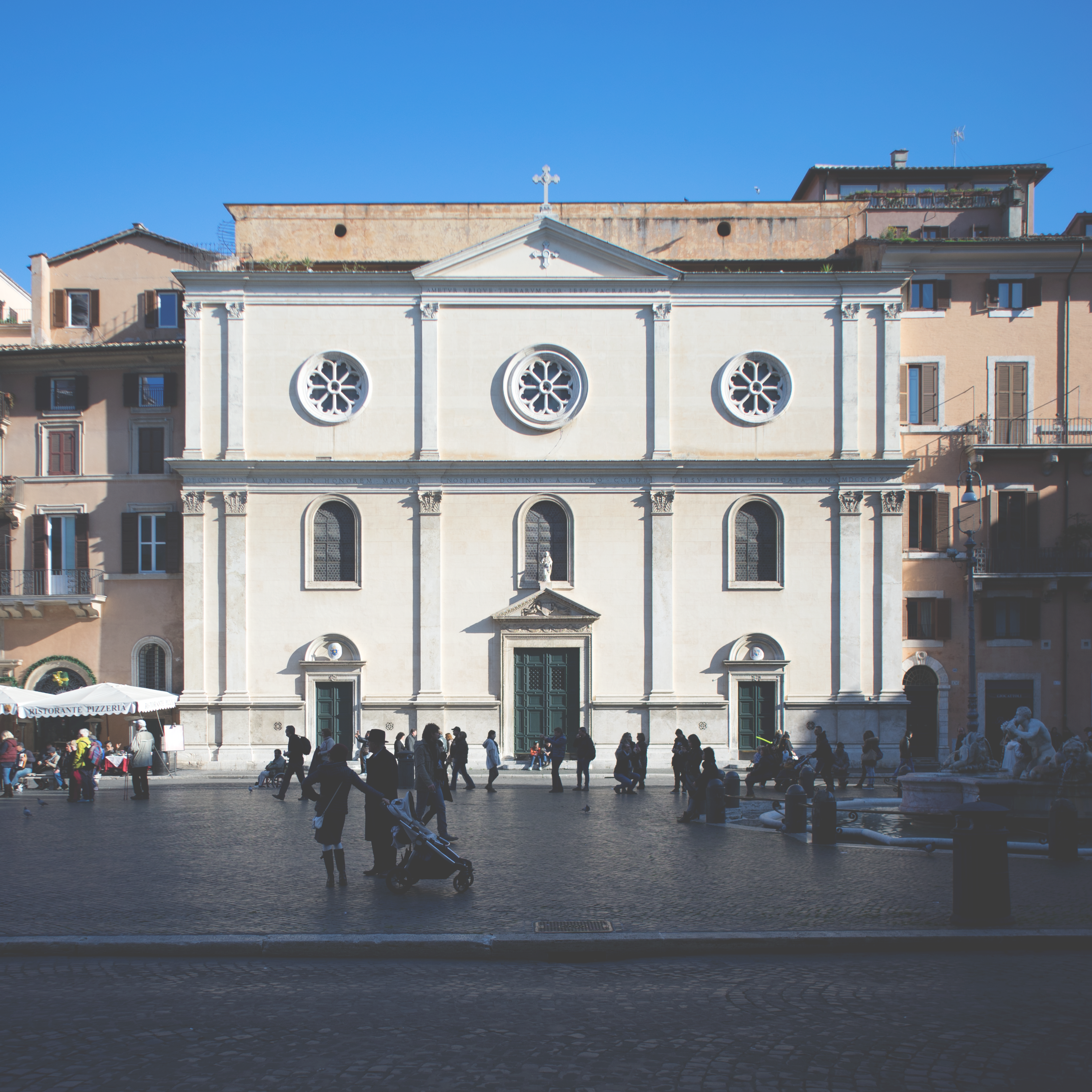
- The façade of Nostra Signora del Sacro Cuore as seen from Piazza Navona.
- Click on the map for a fullscreen view
- 41°53′53.73″N 12°28′24.70″E
- Location: Corso del Rinascimento 27, Rome
- Country: Italy
- Language(s): Italian, Spanish
- Denomination: Catholic
- Tradition: Roman Rite
- Website: nostrasignoradelsacrocuore.it

History
- Status: titular church, Spanish national church
- Founded: 12th century
- Dedication: Mary, mother of Jesus and the Sacred Heart

Architecture
- Architectural type: Renaissance
- Completed: 1938

Administration
- Diocese: Rome

Nostra Signora del Sacro Cuore (lit. 'Our Lady of the Sacred Heart', also known as San Giacomo degli Spagnoli and in Spanish, Santiago de los Españoles) is a Catholic church dedicated to the Virgin Mary located in Rome's Piazza Navona.

== History ==
An earlier church, San Giacomo degli Spagnoli (St James of the Spanish), had been erected in the same place, on the ruins of the Stadium of Domitian, in the 12th century. The first mention of this church is in the will of Henry of Castile (1230-1304), son of King Ferdinand III of Castile, who had given money to build it in 1259.

The edifice was rebuilt for the Holy Year of 1450 using a gift from Alfonso de Paradinas, canon of the Cathedral of Seville. The façade, once facing the opposite side than now, was designed by Bernardo Rossellino. Pope Alexander VI, of Spanish origin, later had a square carved out in front of it, moving two hospices for Spanish pilgrims.

Starting in 1506 San Giacomo was the national church of the kingdom of Castile in Rome. 1518 It was again remodeled in 1518 by Antonio da Sangallo the Younger.

In keeping with the Council of Trent's greater emphasis on the Eucharist, in 1549 Prince Philip of Spain donated funds to commission Gaspar Becerra to provide a gold tabernacle. {This tabernacle may have later been melted down to fashion a new Baroque tabernacle, stolen in 1741.) Philip also paid for a new altarpiece, Girolamo Siciolante da Sermoneta's Crucifixion, (which was later removed to Santa Maria in Monserrato degli Spagnoli). The Crucifixion was flanked by two side panels depicting St. Ildefonsus and St. James.

When Santa Maria in Monserrato degli Spagnoli was completed in the 17th century, the focus of the community shifted to that church, which is now the Spanish national church. The Church of San Giacomo and its annexes were for a long time maintained by the bequests of the Spaniards of Rome. However, with no maintenance provided, in 1818 the church was abandoned by the Spaniards in favor of Santa Maria di Monserrato, where the furnishings and tombs were also transferred. San Giacomo, was deconsecrated in 1824 and sold in 1878 to the French missionaries of the Sacred Heart. Pope Leo XIII had the edifice, which was on the verge of crumbling down, extensively renovated in the late 19th century. At that time the main entrance was moved to face Piazza Navona. The apse and the transept were demolished in 1938 to open the current Corso del Rinascimento avenue.

== Interior ==
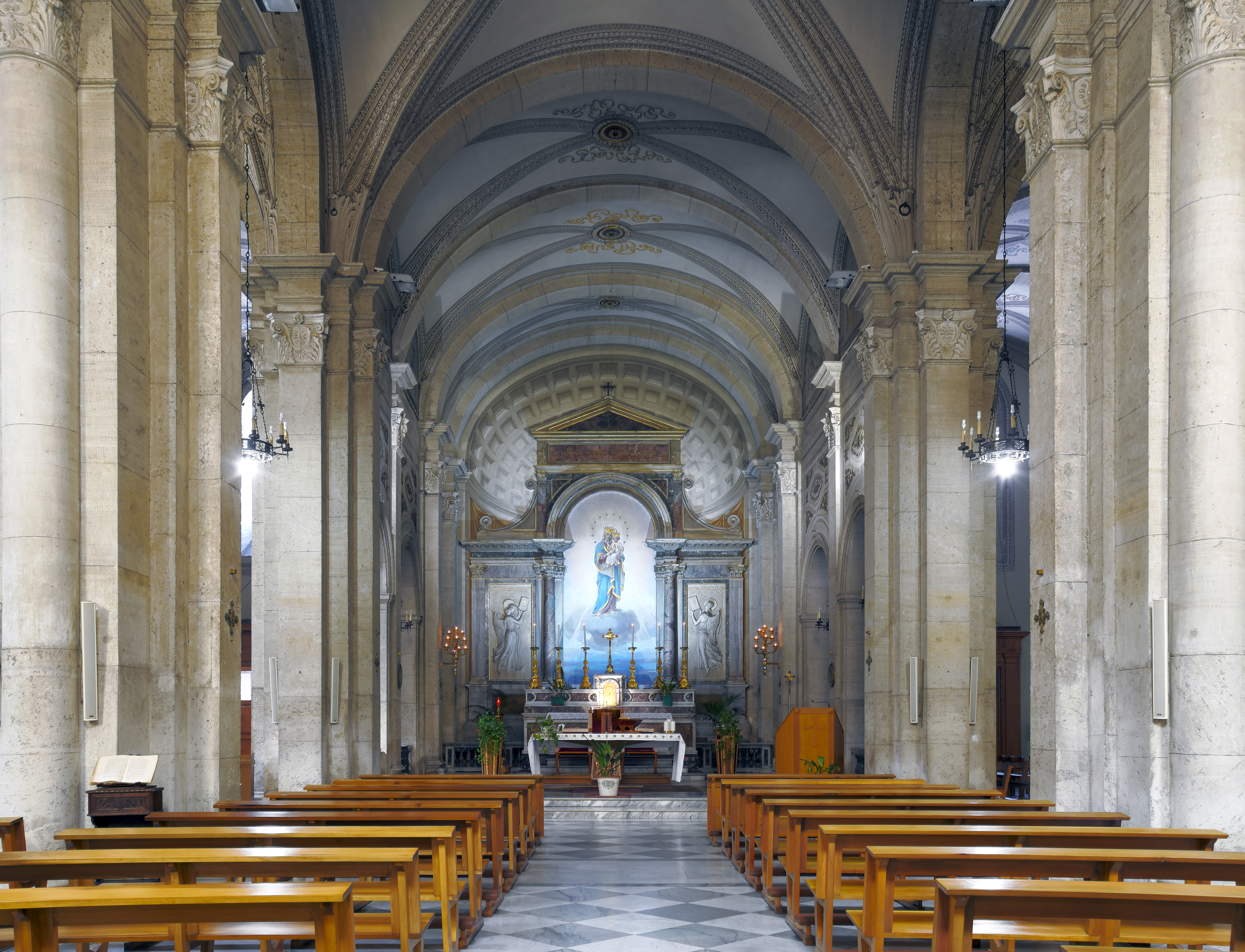
Interior

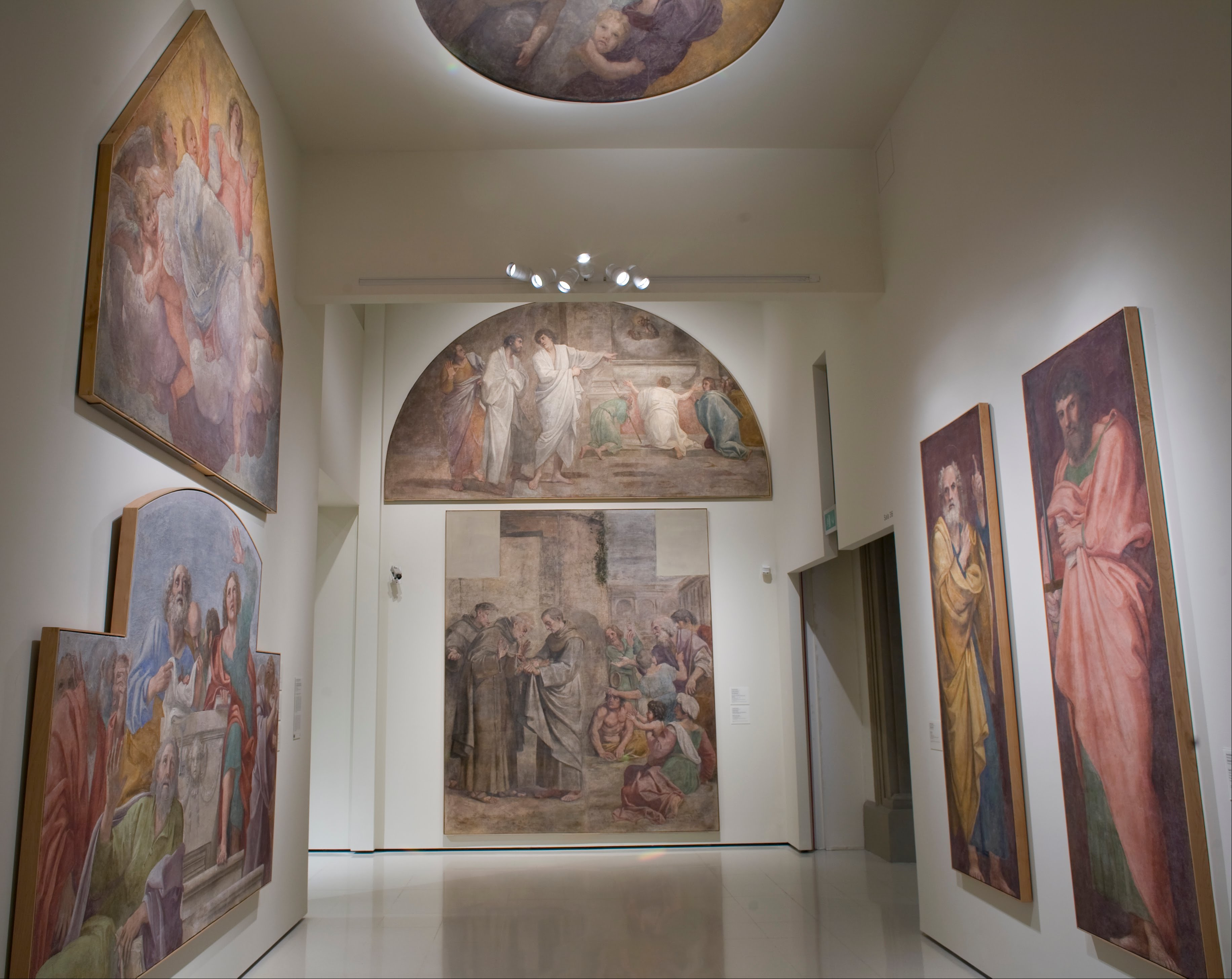
Mural Paintings from the Herrera Chapel conserved at MNAC Barcelona.

Nostra Signora del Sacro Cuore is the earliest of the few hall churches in Rome.

Most of the works of art and funerary monuments in the church were transferred to Santa Maria in Monserrato. What remains in the church are some Renaissance works, such as a chancel in polychrome marble and the marble backdrop behind the high altar. The altarpiece of the Assumption of the Virgin with Glory of Angels and Apostles was made by Flemish-born painter Francisco de Castello.

The Cappella di San Giacomo is also intact. Commissioned as a mortuary chapel by Cardinal Jaume Serra i Cau, it was designed by Antonio da Sangallo the Younger and holds a statue of St. James by Jacopo Sansovino. (There is a copy in Santa Maria in Monserrato degli Spagnoli.

Some of the paintings of the Herrera Chapel were transferred to Museu Nacional d'Art de Catalunya in Barcelona and some to Museo del Prado in Madrid.

== List of Cardinal Protectors ==
- Cesare Zerba, title pro hac vice (February 25, 1965 - July 11, 1973 deceased)
- Mario Luigi Ciappi, (June 27, 1977 - June 22, 1987 appointed Cardinal Priest of Sacro Cuore di Gesù agonizzante a Vitinia)
- Vacant (1987-2001)
- José Saraiva Martins, (February 21, 2001 - February 24, 2009 appointed Cardinal Bishop of Palestrina)
- Kurt Koch (20 November 2010 - ), title pro hac vice since 3 May 2021.

== See also ==
- Mural Paintings from the Herrera Chapel
