= Toponymic surname =

Family name that relates to a location

A toponymic surname or a habitational surname or byname is a surname or byname derived from a place name, which included names of specific locations, such as the individual's place of origin, residence, or lands that they held, or, more generically, names that were derived from regional topographic features. Surnames derived from landscape/topographic features are also called topographic surnames, e.g., de Montibus, de Ponte/Da Ponte/Dupont, de Castello, de Valle/del Valle, de Porta, de Vinea.

Some toponymic surnames originated as personal by-names that later were used as hereditary family names.

The origins of toponymic by-names have been largely attributed to two non-mutually exclusive trends. One linked the nobility to their places of origin and feudal holdings and provided a marker of their status. The other related to the growth of the burgher class in the cities, which partly developed due to migration from the countryside to cities. Also linked was the increased popularity of using the names of saints for naming new-borns, which reduced the pool of given-names in play and stimulated a popular demand (and personal desire) for by-names—which were helpful in distinguishing an individual among increasing numbers of like-named persons. In London in the 13th century, the use of toponymic surnames became dominant.

Some forms originally included a preposition—such as by, in, at (ten in Dutch, zu in German), or of (de in French, Italian and Spanish, van in Dutch, von in German)—that was subsequently dropped, as in "de Guzmán" (of Guzman) becoming simply Guzmán. While the disappearance of the preposition has been linked to toponymic by-names becoming inherited family names, it (dropping the preposition) predates the trend of inherited family surnames. In England, this can be seen as early as the 11th century. And although there is some regional variation, a significant shift away from using the preposition can be seen during the 14th century.

In some cases, the preposition coalesced (fused) into the name, such as Atwood (at wood) and Daubney (originating as de Albigni, from Saint-Martin-d'Aubigny). In the aristocratic societies of Europe, both nobiliary and non-nobiliary forms of toponymic surnames exist, as in some languages they evolved differently. In France, non-nobiliary forms tended to fuse the preposition, where nobiliary forms tended to retain it as the discrete particle, although this was never an invariable practice.

Issues such as local pronunciation can cause toponymic surnames to take a form that varies significantly from the toponym that gave rise to them. Examples include Wyndham, derived from Wymondham, Anster from Anstruther, and Badgerly from Badgworthy.

One must be cautious to interpret a surname as toponymic based on its spelling alone, without knowing its history. A notable example is the name of Jeanne d'Arc, which is not related to a place called Arc but instead is a distorted patronymic (see "Name of Joan of Arc"). Likewise, it has been suggested that a toponymic cannot be assumed to be a place of residence or origin: merchants could have adopted a toponymic by-name to associate themselves with a place where they never resided.

In Polish, a toponymic surname may be created by adding "(w)ski" or "cki" at the end. For example, Maliszewski is a toponymic surname associated with one of the places in Poland named Maliszew, Maliszewo, or Maliszów.

In anthroponymic terminology, toponymic surnames belong among topoanthroponyms (class of anthroponyms that are formed from toponyms).

== See also ==
- Nisba (onomastics)
- Sinhalese name
- Territorial designation
- Toponymy
