= Michele Plancher =

Italian painter

Michele Plancher (1808 – 1888) was an Italian painter, depicting historic-mythologic and sacred subjects.

He trained, along with Giovanni Tebaldi, in his native Parma under Domenico Muzzi at the city's Academy of Fine Arts. Upon the death of Muzzi, he studied under Biagio Martini, whose contemporary pupils also included Antonio Isac, Paolo Toschi, Giambattista Callegari, Giambattista Borghesi, Tommaso Gasparotti, and Stanislao Campana. He painted for the church of San Vitale, Parma. Plancher was most active from 1815 to 1835.
