= San Vitale, Parma =

Church in Parma, Emilia Romagna, Italy

Coordinates: 44°48′4.01″N 10°19′44.78″E

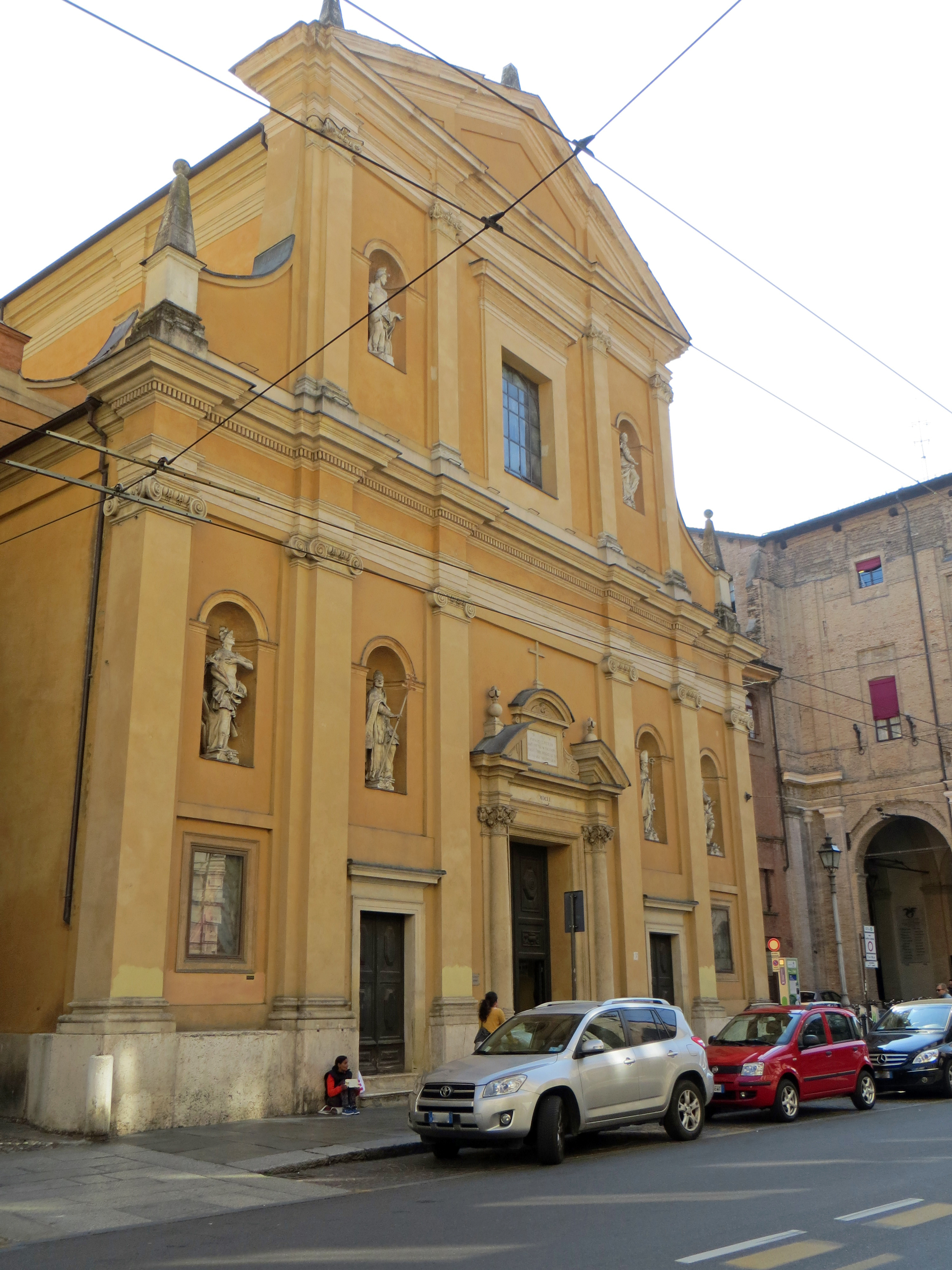
Facade of Church

San Vitale is a Baroque style, Roman Catholic church located in central Parma, region of Emilia Romagna, Italy. it stands just east of the Palazzo del Comune and Piazza Garibaldi.

== History ==
A religious building at the site existed in the 9th century, dedicated to San Vitale, tradition holds it was founded by King Pepin of Italy. The present layout dates to a reconstruction that took place from 1651 to 1658 by the architect Cristoforo Rangoni, also called Ficarelli. Domenico Valmagini reinforced the dome in 1676. In 1913, the property was appropriated by the town.

The façade was decorated by the sculptor Felice Pascetti and has six statues attributed to Pietro Sbravati depicting Saints Vitalis and Valeria above, with Valeria's bride and children under the external sides, as well as Saints Gervasius and Protasius, and in the niches Saints Gregory Magnus and Ambrose.

== Interior decoration ==
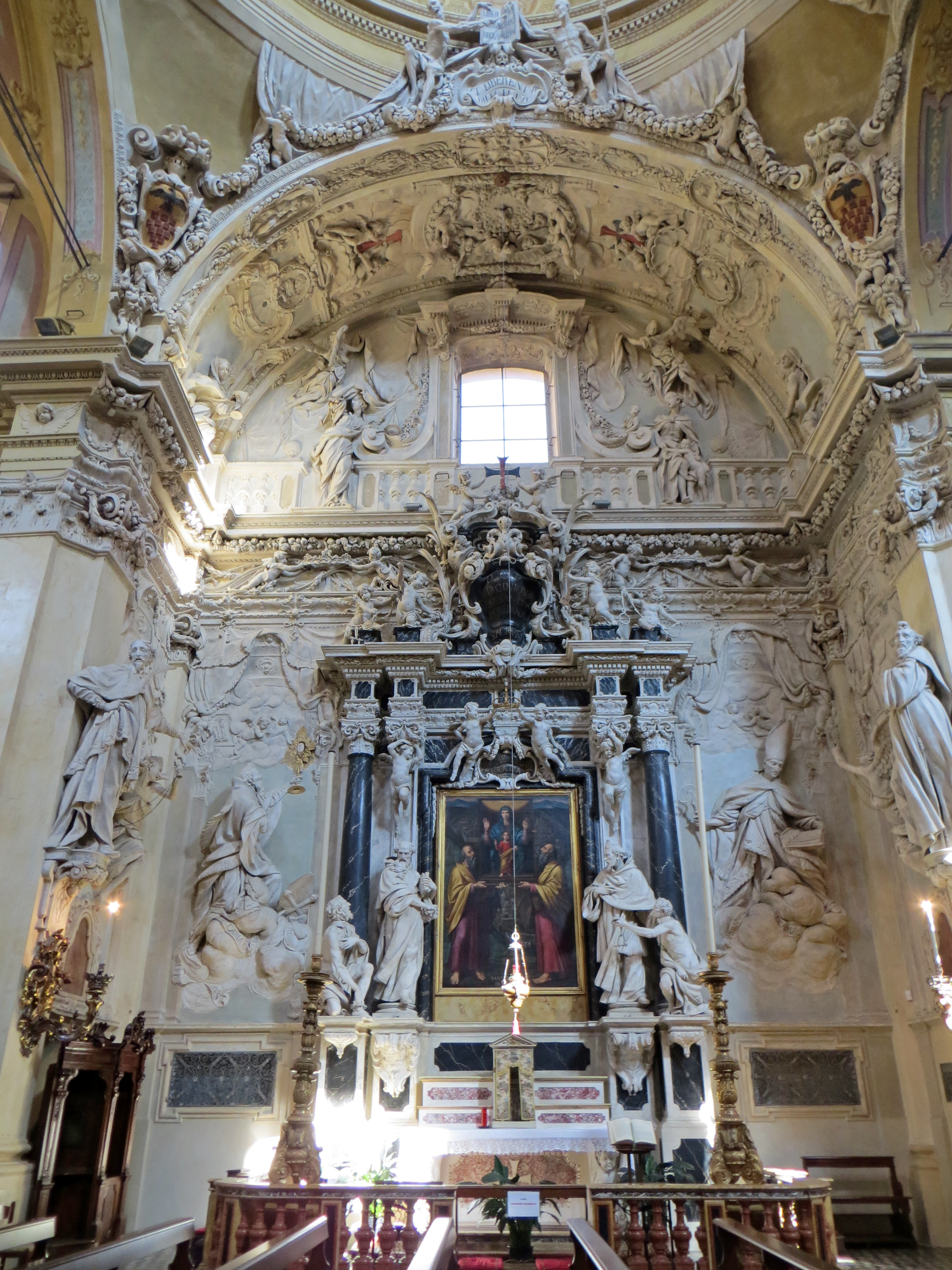
Monumento Beccaria

The first chapel on the right has a painting of the Charity of San Carlo Borromeo by Mauro Oddi.

The second chapel on the right has a Madonna di Caravaggio by Carlo Francesco Nuvolone.

The 3rd chapel on the right has a Saints Anthony, Francis Xavier, and Virgin with Child. Over a door is a large canvas depicting St Gregory praying for Souls in Purgatory by Giovanni Tebaldi.

In the 1st chapel on the left is a St Tiburzio Martyr forced to burn before an idol by Clemente Ruta and a marble Ecce Homo by Giocondo Viglioli.

In the 3rd chapel on the left is a Meeting of St Francis of Paola with King Louis XI of France at Ambois by Gaetano Callani.

The altar in polychrome marble was designed by Pietro Righini, with statuary sculpted by Moggiani. The main altarpiece in the church now was painted Michele Plancher. Originally, the church had a large work by Sebastiano Ricci, but this was looted by Napoleon's armies.

The frescoes in the Sanctuary and the ceiling (1763) were painted by the Abbot Giuseppe Peroni; the quadratura ornamentation (1760) was completed by Gaspare Bazzani and Antonio Betti.

The first chapel on the right is dedicated to the Holy Virgin of Constantinople or the Virgin of Deliverance (Madonna del Riscatto); the stucco decoration was completed in 1669 by Luca and Domenico Reti (or Reddi).

The second chapel has a 17th-century altarpiece depicting Phillip Neri meets St Felice Cappuccino at Montecavallo by Giovanni Battista Caccioli.

The fourth chapel has an altarpiece depicting the Charity of San Carlo Borromeo by Mauro Oddi.

The church had a copy, painted by Rondani, made of its former masterpiece, Adoration of the Child by Correggio. There was also a Santa Cecilia attributed to Girolamo Mazzola.

The Assumption of the Virgin over the entrance was completed by Giovanni Gaibazzi, and donated to the church by Archduke Leopold of Austria.

An urn under the main altar putatively holds the relics of St Vital's body, brought in 1648 from Rome by Gherardo III of Sissa.

There is a Martyrdom of St John Nepomunk by Pietro Rubini and a Sacrifice of Isaac by a follower of Lionello Spada. Moreover, the church houses canvases by Matteo Rusca, Latino Barilli and Donnino Pozzi.
