= Santa Lucia, Parma =

Church in Parma, Italy

Coordinates: 44°48′9.07″N 10°19′43.95″E

Santa Lucia is a Baroque-style Roman Catholic church located on Strada Cavour in central Parma, region of Emilia Romagna, Italy.

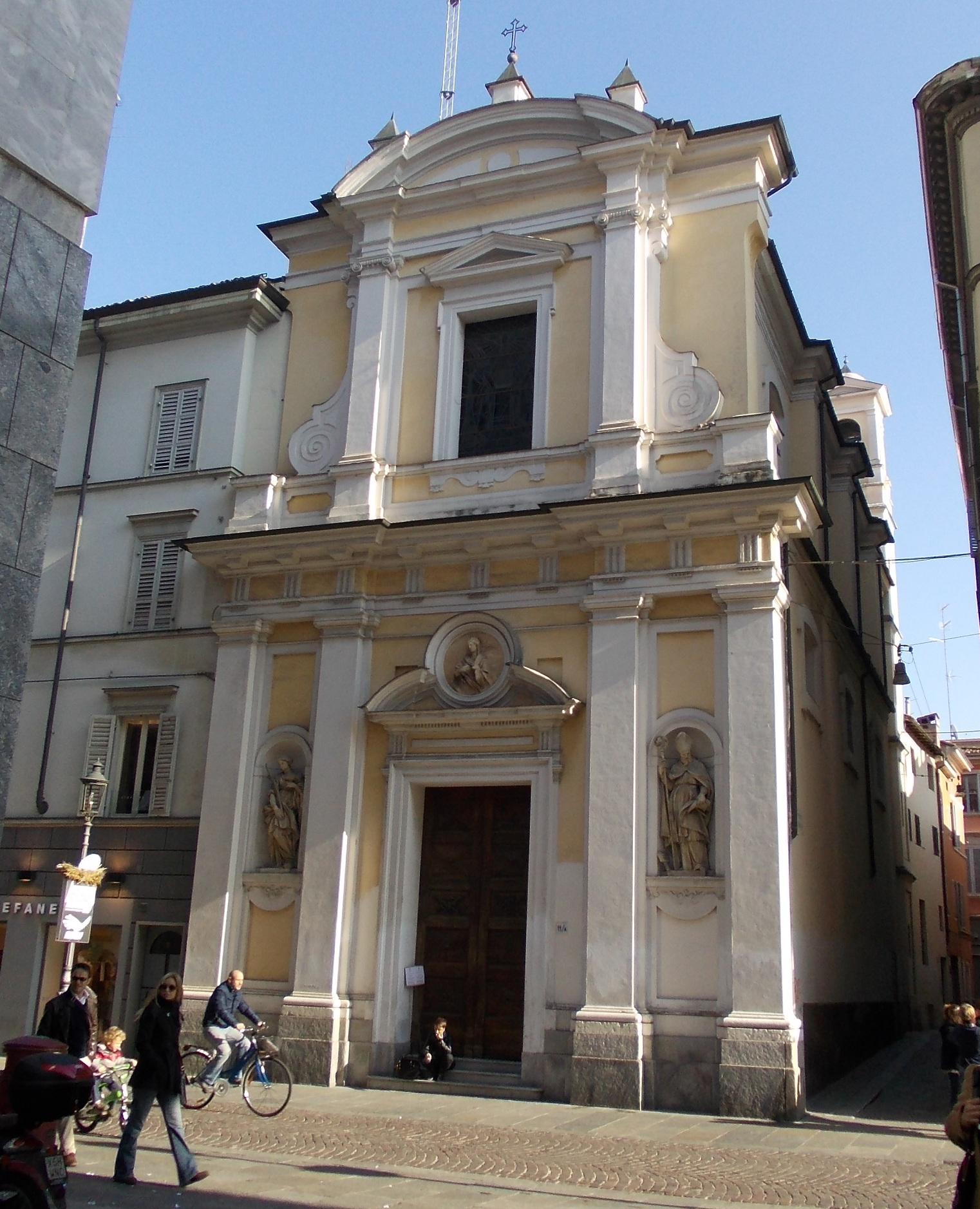
Facade of church.

== History ==
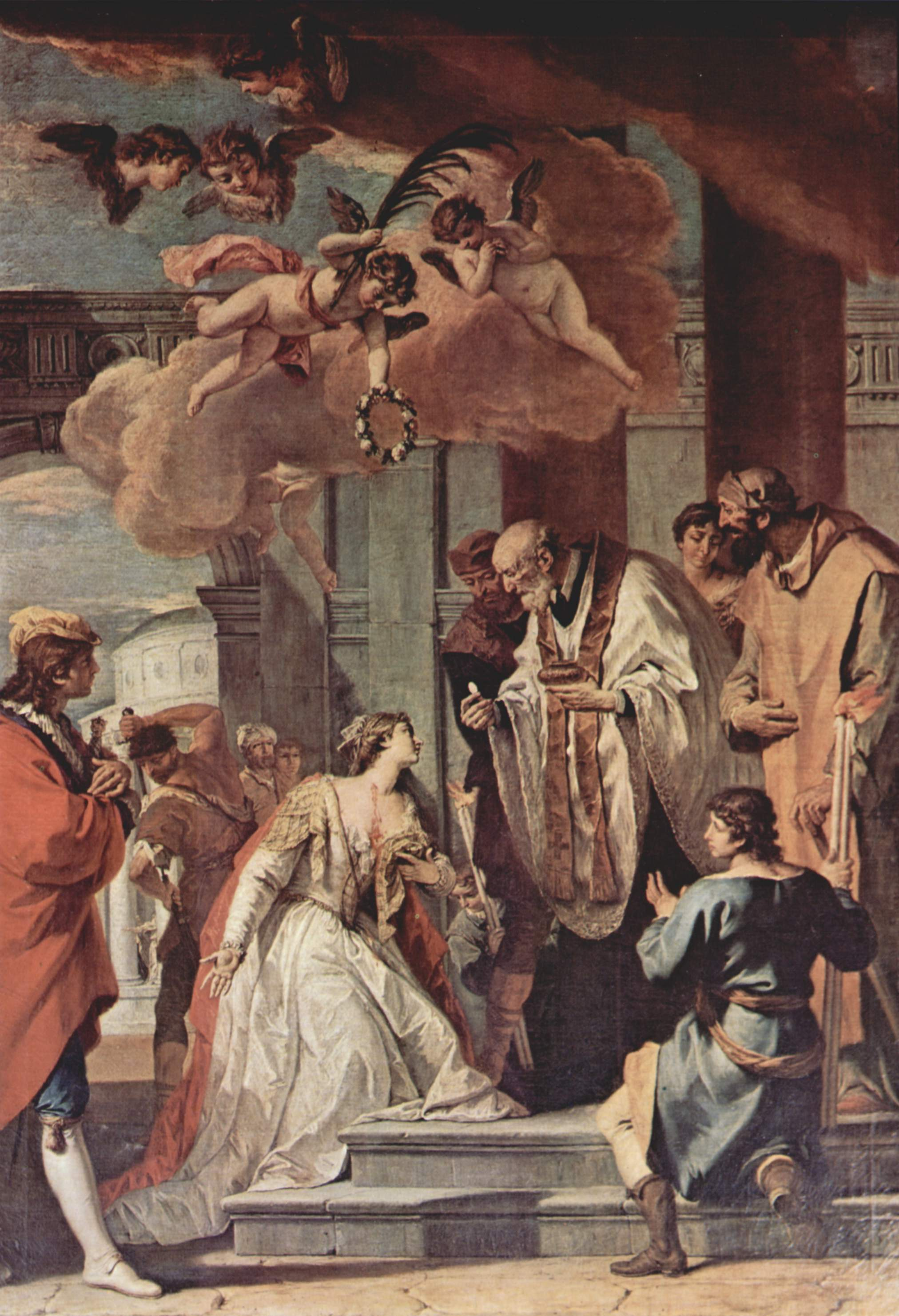
Last Communion and Martyrdom of St Lucy by Sebastiano Ricci

A church on the site called San Michele in Canale is first mentioned in documents from 1223. The present building was erected by the Confraternity of San Carlo Borromeo in 1615. The structure was enlarged and facade designed by the architect Mauro Oddi and in 1697, reconsecrated and named Santa Lucia.

Charles III, Duke of Parma was knifed by paid assassins in front of this church on 27 March 1854, while he was taking a stroll through the town. He died within a day.

The facade sculptures of Saints Ilario and Agatha and the façade medallion were completed by Giacomo Barbieri.

The main altar has a canvas depicting the Last Communion and Martyrdom of St Lucy by the Venetian painter Sebastiano Ricci. The ceiling quadratura frescoes were painted by Alessandro Baratta (painter). The church also has paintings by Giulio Cesare Amidano and Antonio Ligori. The cupola frescoes were painted by the Theatine priest Filippo Maria Galletti.
