= Scaramuzza =

Scaramuzza is an Italian surname. Notable people with the surname include:

- Camillo Scaramuzza (1843–1915), Italian painter
- Francesco Scaramuzza (1803–1886), Italian painter and poet
- Vincenzo Scaramuzza (1885–1968), Italian classical pianist and music teacher
