= Prati (disambiguation) =

Prati can refer to:

- Prati, neighborhood in Rome
- Prati di Tivo, frazione in Pietracamela, Teramo

Surnames

- Antonio Prati (1819–1909), Italian painter and scenographer
- Edmundo Prati (1889-1970), Uruguayan sculptor
- Enrico Prati (1842–1913), Italian painter
- Eugenio Prati (1842-1907), Italian painter
- Gioacchino Prati (1790-1863), Italian revolutionary and patriot
- Giovanni Prati (1815-1884), Italian poet
- Lidy Prati (1921–2008), Argentine painter
- Pamela Prati (born 1958), Italian actress and showgirl
- Pierino Prati (1946–2020), retired Italian football player
