= Enrico Prati =

Italian painter (1842–1913)

Enrico Prati (Piacenza, Papal States, 1842 – Paderna, 1913) was an Italian painter.

== Biography ==
He was the son of the painter Antonio Prati. He studied in the Academy of Fine Arts of Parma, under professors Gaetano Signorini, Francesco Scaramuzza, Agostino Marchesi, Giacomo Giacopelli, and cavaliere Girolamo Magnani. After four years of studio work in Parma he returned to Piacenza, and worked at decorative painting and scenography under his father and Giuseppe Badiaschi. He also painted in oil, and painted vedute of the Interior of the Duomo of Piacenza and Interior of San Sisto, exhibited in 1868 at Milan. He also painted portraits, he completed the portrait of monsignor Mascaretti, Bishop of Susa, once found in the Carmelitan Convento in Concesa d'Adda, and portraits of counts Domenico and Francesco Cicala, signor Corvi, deputy Pasquali, bishop Scalabrini, and others. He painted frescoes for the sanctuary and cupola of the rural church of Pontenure, and in the chapel of the Rosary of the main church of Castel San Giovanni.
