= Gasparotti =

Gasparotti is an Italian surname. Notable people with the surname include:

- Jean-Pierre Gasparotti (born 1942), Monegasque sport shooter
- Tommaso Gasparotti (1785–1847), Italian poet, painter, paleographist, and bibliophile archivist

== See also ==
- Gasparotto
