= Family of Don Philip of Bourbon =

Painting by Giuseppe Baldrighi

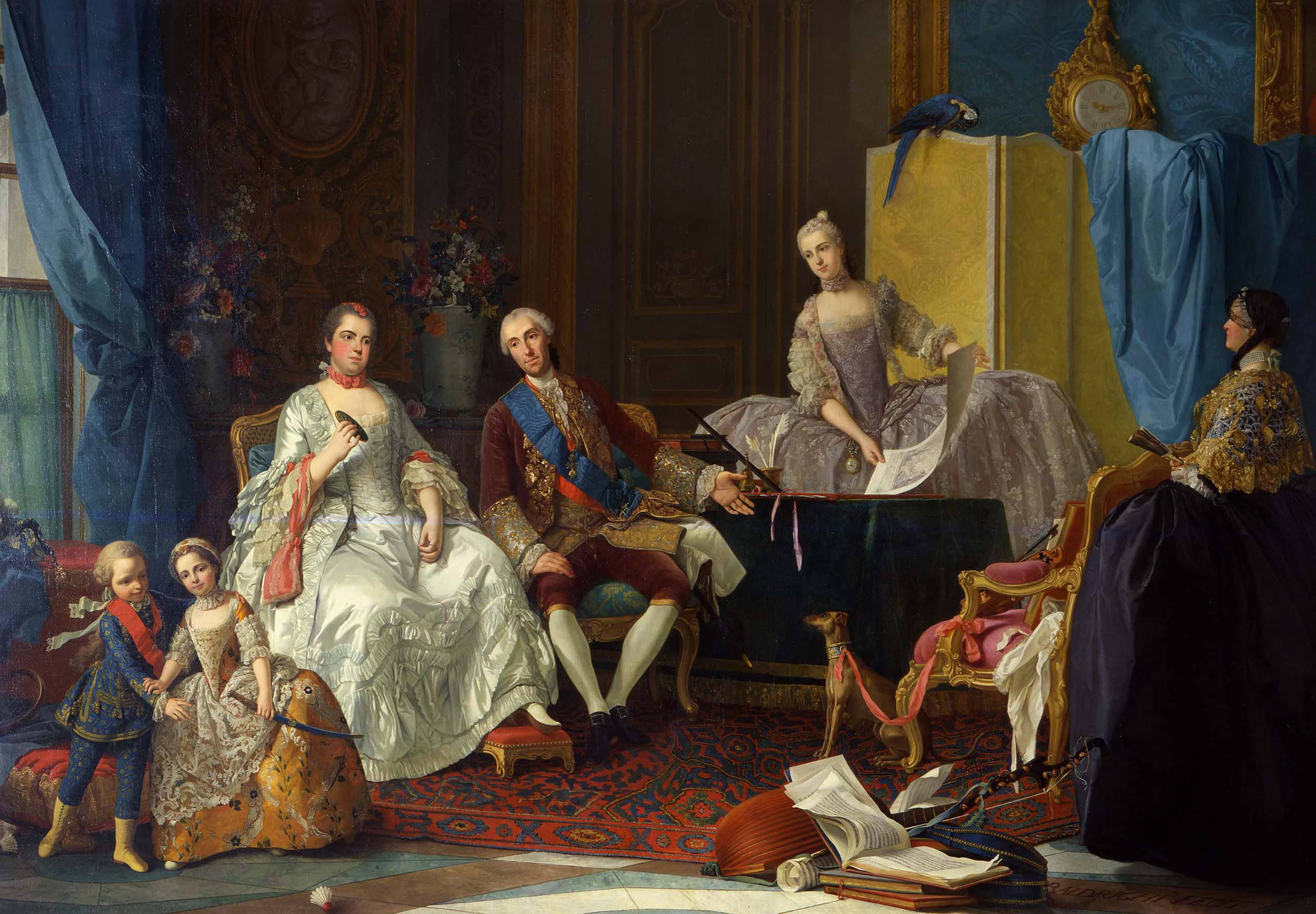
- Artist: Giuseppe Baldrighi
- Year: c. 1757
- Type: Oil painting
- Dimensions: 285 cm × 415 cm (112 in × 163 in)
- Location: Galleria nazionale di Parma

The portrait of Don Philip of Bourbon is an oil painting on canvas ( 285x415 cm ) of Giuseppe Baldrighi, dated to about 1757, in the Galleria Nazionale Di Parma.

== Sources ==
- Fornari Schianchi, Lucia (2000). Galleria Nazionale di Parma, Catalogo delle opere. Milan: Franco Maria Ricci.
- Sureda, Joan (2008). Galleria Nazionale di Parma, Catalogo delle opere. Madrid: Turner.
