= Giacomo Giacopelli =

Italian painter

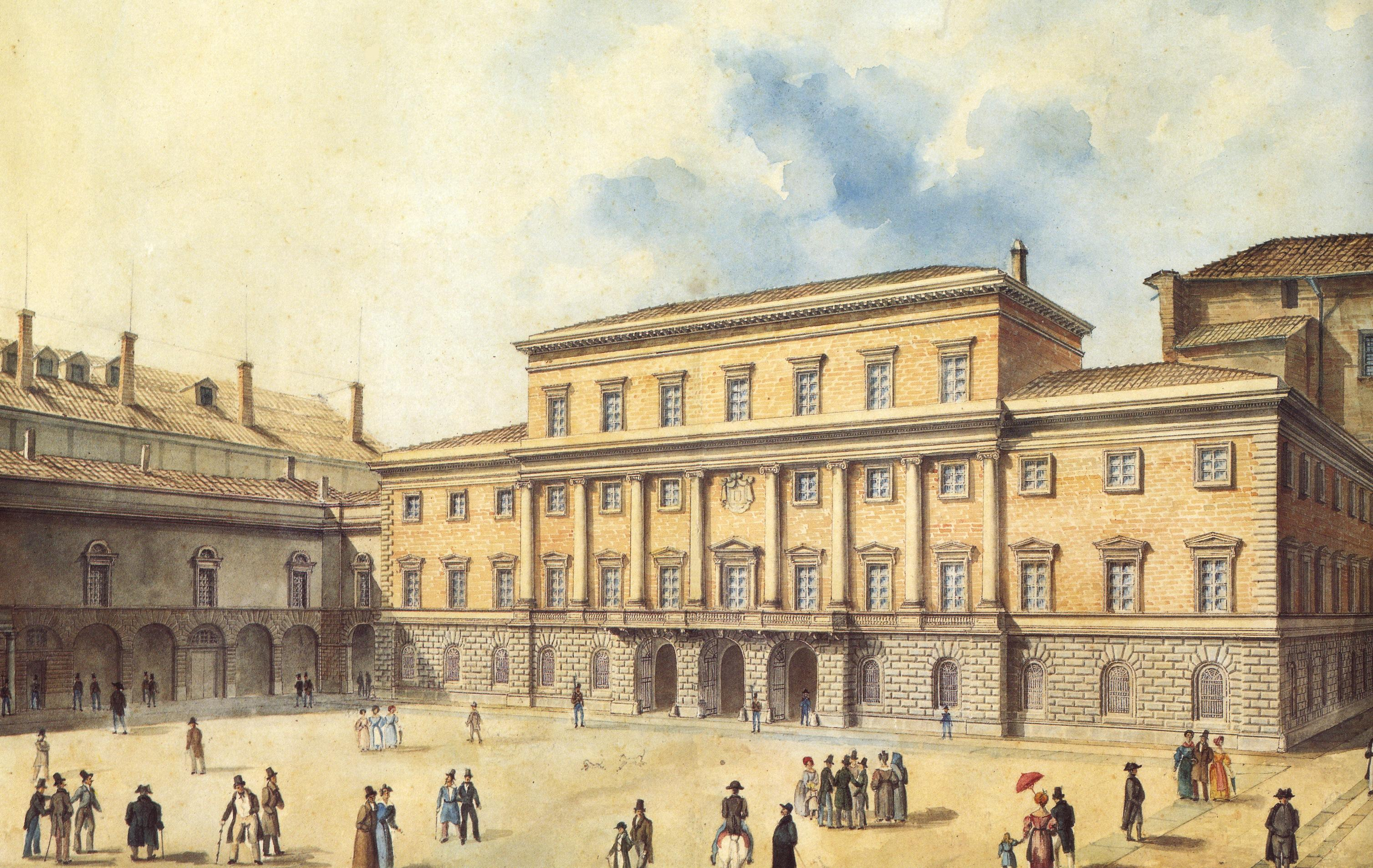
The Ducal Palace of Parma

Giacomo Giacopelli (27 January 1808 – 2 April 1893) was an Italian painter and scenic designer, active in Parma and Piacenza.

He was born in Parma, and trained under Giuseppe Boccaccio, whom he succeeded as scenographer for the Teatro di Parma from 1839 to 1851. Giacopelli collaborated from 1840-1844 with Nicola Aquila, and with Magnani (1848). In 1857, he was named instructor of perspective at the Academy of Fine Arts of Parma. Together with Vincenzo Bertolotti and Giacomo Gelati they completed the decoration of the Teatro di Verdi located in Fiorenzuola d’Arda, which opened in 1853.

Few works of Giacopelli remain, including his depiction of the Interior of the Duomo of Parma during the blessing of the flag of the National Guard, and the Atrium of the Palazzo della Pilotta in Parma. He painted some of the quadratura behind the mains altars of the churches of Santa Cristina and San Rocco.

Enrico Prati was one of his pupils.
