= Gasparetto =

Gasparetto is a surname. Notable people with the surname include:

- Daniele Gasparetto (born 1988), Italian footballer
- Mirco Gasparetto (born 1980), Italian footballer
- Zíbia Gasparetto (1926–2018), Brazilian spiritualist writer

== See also ==
- Gasparotto
