= Alessandro Baratta =

Italian painter and engraver

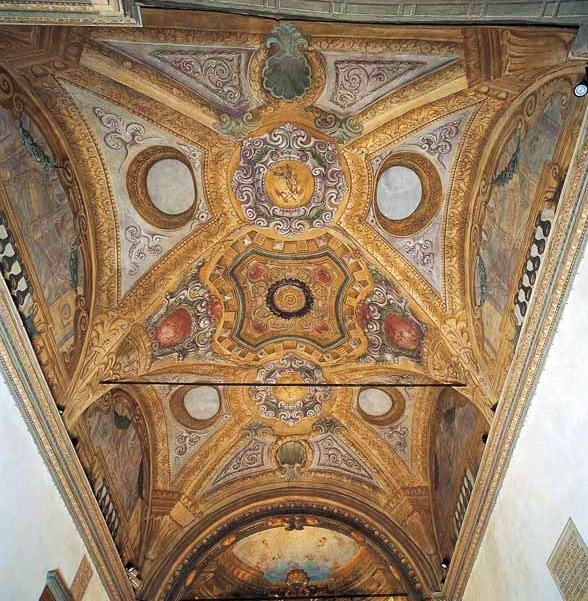

Alessandro Baratta (April 16, 1639 – September 1, 1714) was an Italian painter and engraver.

== Biography ==
He was born and died in Parma. He is known in Parma for quadratura and elsewhere through a topographic engraving of a view in Naples.

He was born near the church of San Lorenzo, Parma. He studied painting with Francesco Maria Reti and at the age of 28 he entered the Compagnia di San Giuseppe, a confraternity based near the church of Santa Croce.

His first documented work dates back to 1668, when, on behalf of the College of Nobles, he realized the scenes and apparatuses for the baptism of Odoardo II Farnese, the first son of the Duke Ranuccio Farnese. A few years later, attention was paid to the trompe-l'œil decoration of the church of Santa Cristina, which the Florentine Filippo Maria Galletti was frescoing with episodes from the life of San Gaetano da Thiene, founder of the Theatines who ran the church. The lack of funds had prevented the construction of the dome and the apse; the Baratta painted a large canvas that simulated, in a wide perspective, a dome, creating a scenic effect that was much appreciated; the shadings were arranged so that those who entered the church could be made to believe that they were true.

In 1672 he became the first regent of the Compagnia di San Giuseppe. Married to Maria Lucia, he went to live in the parish of San Paolo. In 1676 he was commissioned to restore the paintings of the church of Santa Croce and to re-fresco the vault. He also worked in the Duomo, where he painted frescoes on the ceiling and on the lunettes in a Chapel.

In 1689, when Stefano Lolli from Bologna designed the court theater next to the Farnese theater, Baratta made the design, indicating its decorations and paintings. Between 1695 and 1697 he painted the dome of the church of Santa Lucia.

His last documented works are the decoration of the chapel built in Santa Maria del Quartiere behind the high altar (1694) and for the church of the Certosa di San Girolamo (1699).

He also worked in Naples, where he made a burin engraving representing the southern slope of the Camaldoli hill.
