= Ignazio Affani =

Italian painter (1828–1889)

Ignazio Affani (March 22, 1828 – July 29, 1889) was an Italian painter, mainly painting historical and biblical subjects.

== Biography ==
He was born in Borgo San Donnino of Parma. He studied at the Academy of Fine Arts of Parma, under Giovanni Battista Callegari, Francesco Scaramuzza, Giuseppe Gaibazzi, and Francesco Pescatori. He fought in the revolutions of 1848–1849. In 1859, he was awarded a stipend to study in Florence. Returning to Parma, he was awarded a number of honors, including being named honorary academic at Naples. Among his works are Gerolamo Savonarola in carcere (Girolamo Savonarola in jail), sent to the 1869 Universal Exposition at Vienna; The Daughter of Jephthah, Bramante introduces Raphael to Pope Julius II (1859), Garibaldini taking leave of his family (1861, Pitti Palace), Rebekah delights in the bracelets sent by Isaac (1862), The exile of the Medici from Florence, and A XIVth century Concert. He painted frescoes for the chapel of San Bernardo in the Duomo di Parma. He died poor in Milan, after many viccisitudes afflicted his family. His grandson was the sculptor Garibaldo Affanni.
