= Giovan Battista Aleotti =

Italian architect

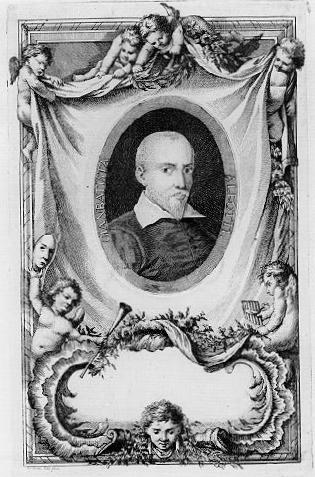
- Giovan Battista Aleotti
- Born: 1546; Argenta, Duchy of Ferrara
- Died: 12 December 1636 (aged 89–90); Ferrara, Papal States
- Known for: Teatro Farnese; Santa Maria del Quartiere, Parma; San Carlo Borromeo, Ferrara
- Scientific career
- Fields: Architecture, mathematics, engineering

Giovan Battista Aleotti (1546 – 12 December 1636) was an Italian architect, engineer and writer.

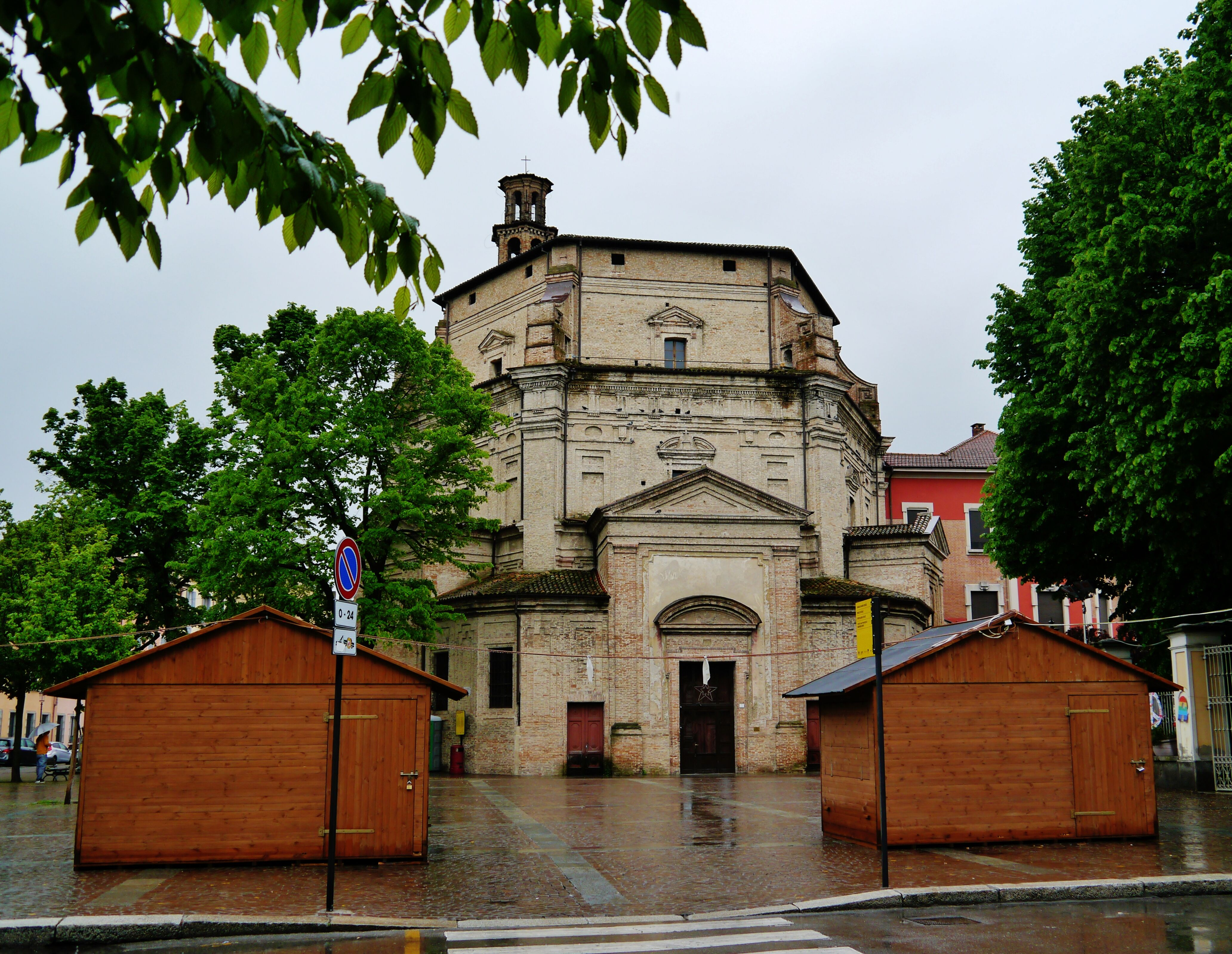
Church of Santa Maria del Quartiere, Parma.

== Biography ==
Born in Argenta, he moved young to Ferrara, where he was formed by contact with technicians of merit such as Marco Antonio Pasi, Cornelio Bentivoglio, Galasso Alghisi and Silvio Belli, in a stimulating cultural environment in which personalities such as Francesco Patrizi, Antonio Montecatini, Cesare Cremonini and Torquato Tasso participated. Beginning as an apprentice for art and the science of engineering, in 1571 Aleotti began to work under Alfonso II d'Este. With Alessandro Balbi he designed the façade of the University in 1610. He gave a new façade to the Rocca Scandiano, the home of the Boiardo family. He is known for his designs in Parma, including the Teatro Farnese (1618–1628) and, with the assistance of his pupil Giovanni Battista Magnani, the hexagonal church of Santa Maria del Quartiere (1604–1619). He also helped design the façades of the Palazzi Bentivoglio and Bevilacqua-Costabili in Ferrara.

In addition to important works in the fields of architecture and hydraulics, Aleotti wrote several important scientific works. He translated of Hero of Alexandria's Pneumatics (Gli artifitiosi et curiosi moti spiritali), published in Ferrara by Baldini in 1589, to which he added "four theorems" that consisted in the description of mechanical and hydraulic devices. The translation was very popular, being reprinted in 1647 at Bologna and in 1693 at Paris. Aleotti was, along with Biagio Rossetti, the architect who most influenced the urban design and the layout of the territory of Ferrara, with the construction of numerous churches (S. Carlo, Stimmate, ete.), of theaters (Intrepidi, Sala del Palazzo Pubblico), today unfortunately lost, with works of fortifications for the city, and above all, with his activities in the territory of Ferrara, in the cut of Porto Viro, in the regulation of the river Reno, in the Este reclamation and Bentivoglio. His work as a treatise writer, in good measure still unpublished, was founded on the knowledge of a mass of scientific and technical literature, as shown by his private library.

== Bibliography ==
- Wittkower, Rudolf (1993). "Art and Architecture Italy, 1600–1750". Pelican History of Art. 1980. Penguin Books Ltd. pp. 122–123.
- Quintavalle, Armando O.; Povoledo, Elena (1960). "ALEOTTI, Giovan Battista, detto l'Argenta". Dizionario Biografico degli Italiani (in Italian). Vol. 2: Albicante–Ammannati. Rome: Istituto dell'Enciclopedia Italiana. OCLC 883370.
