= Enrico Bandini =

Italian painter

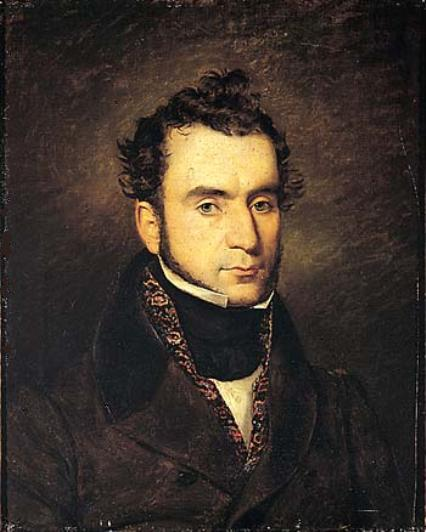
Portrait of Giovanni Rossi by Enrico Bandini (1807–1888). Housed at the Glauco Lombardi Museum, Parma

Enrico Bandini (September 13, 1807 – February 27, 1888) was an Italian painter, active in Parma, Italy.

He trained in his native Parma, at the city's Academy of Fine Arts under Giovanni Tebaldi. He painted both portraits and sacred subjects. He painted a Supper at Emmaus for the church of Sala Baganza. He died in Parma.
