= Camillo Scaramuzza =

Italian painter (1843–1915)

Camillo Scaramuzza (1843–1915) was an Italian painter, of mainly genre subjects. He also was noted as a scenographer.

He was born and resident in Parma. In the 1870 Italian Exposition of Fine Arts held at Parma, he exhibited many oil paintings depicting: The Alps da Vajo (Appennini), and the other an oil depicting: A Morning on the Apennines; Canale del Naviglio in Parma; Un temporale sul torrente (Parma) another canvas representing Avamposti Garibaldini sulla strada di Riva nel Tirolo. He was the nephew of the painter Francesco Scaramuzza.
