= San Carlo Borromeo, Ferrara =

Church building in Ferrara, Italy

Coordinates: 44°50′16″N 11°37′15″E

San Carlo Borromeo is a Baroque, Roman Catholic church located on Corso Giovecca #191, a block east of the Castello Estense in Ferrara, region of Emilia-Romagna, Italy.

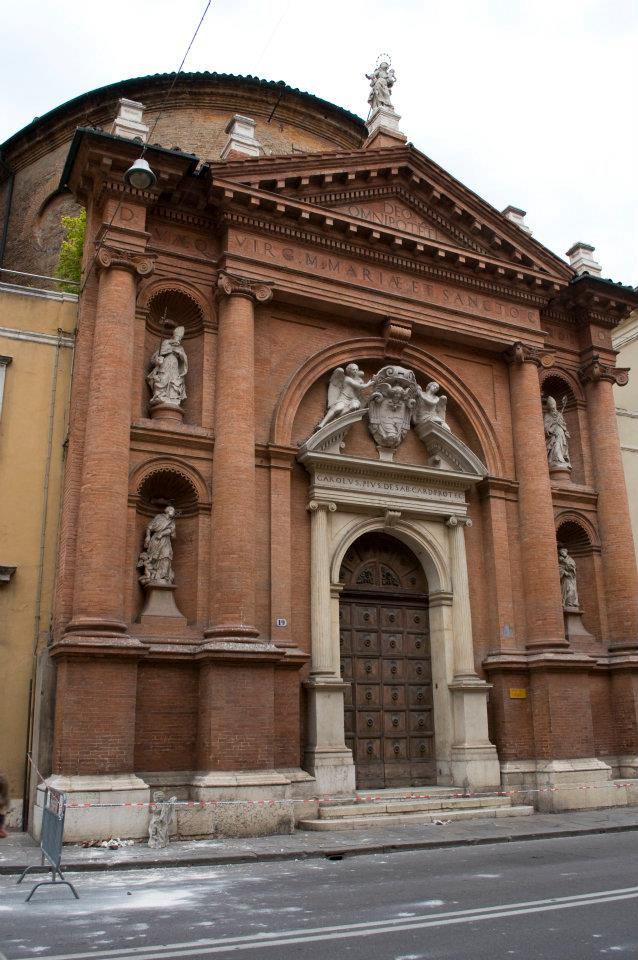
Facade of San Carlo

== History ==
Construction of this church took place from 1612-1623, at the site of a chapel dedicated to Saint Filippo e Giacomo, designed by Alberto Schiatti, for the hospital of Santa Anna, which once extended parallel to the facade. The San Carlo church was designed by Giovanni Battista Aleotti, commissioned by Cardinal Carlo Emmanuele Pio.

The earthquake of 2012 caused closure of the church. Restoration of the facade was recently patronized by the Fondazione Cassa di Risparmio di Ferrara. By 2013, reinforcement of the roof was complete.

The facade is decorated by emotive statues of saints and two angels holding a heraldic shield. The angels were sculpted by Angelo Putti, and some have attributed all the statues. Behind the facade is an oval layout with two lateral chapels. The apse contain wooden choir stalls.

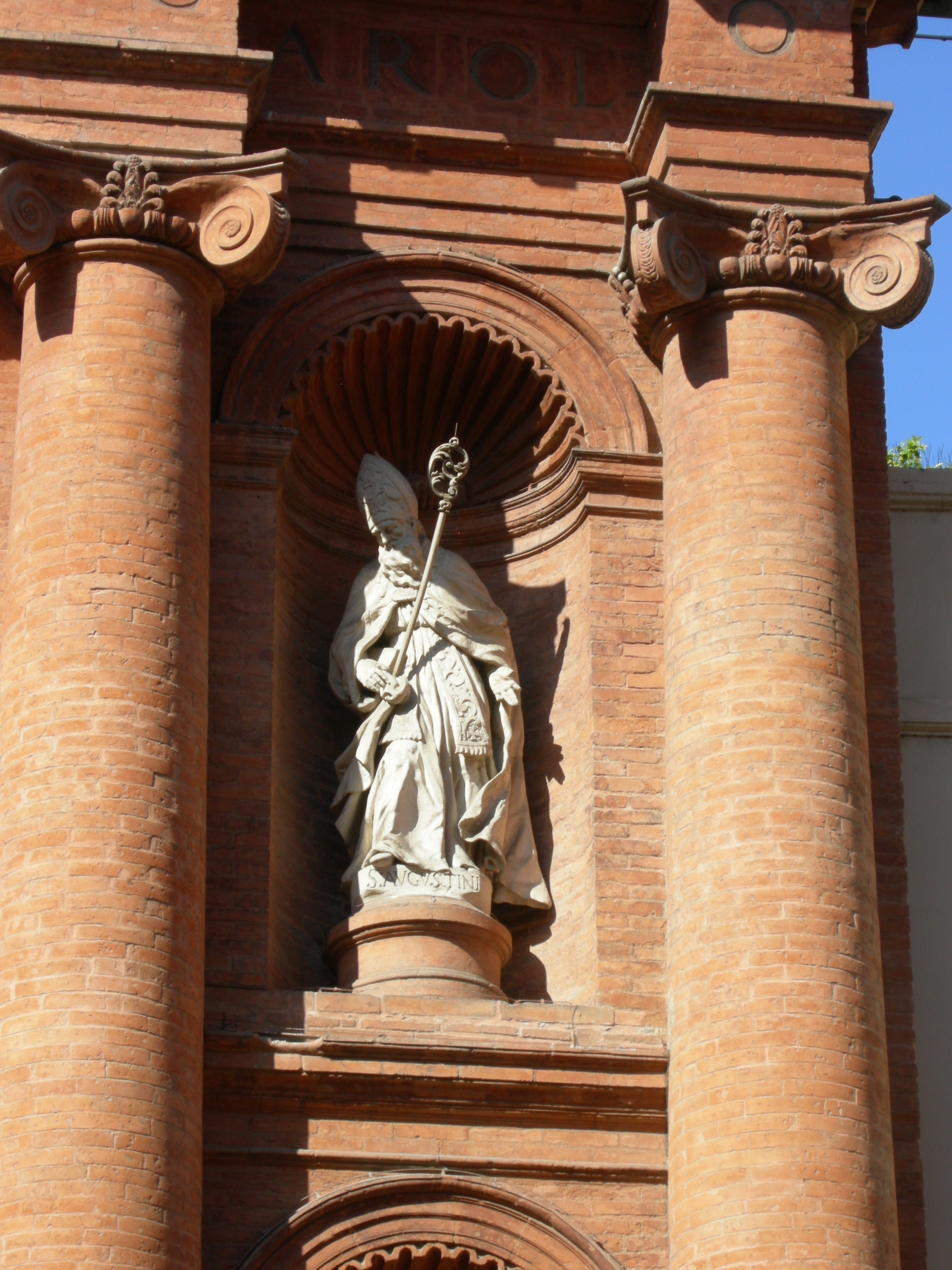
St Augustine statue, facade.

The nave has stucco statues of the four doctors of the church: Augustine, Gregory the Great, Jerome, and Ambrose by an 18th-century sculptors of the Venetian-school.

The ceiling was frescoed in 1674 by Giuseppe Avanzi with collaboration of the quadraturist Giuseppe Menegatti.

In the center oval, Avanzi painted the Glory of the Virgin with Saints Maurelio and Carlo Borromeo. The lunette over the entrance has a San Carlo painted by Antonio Bonfanti.

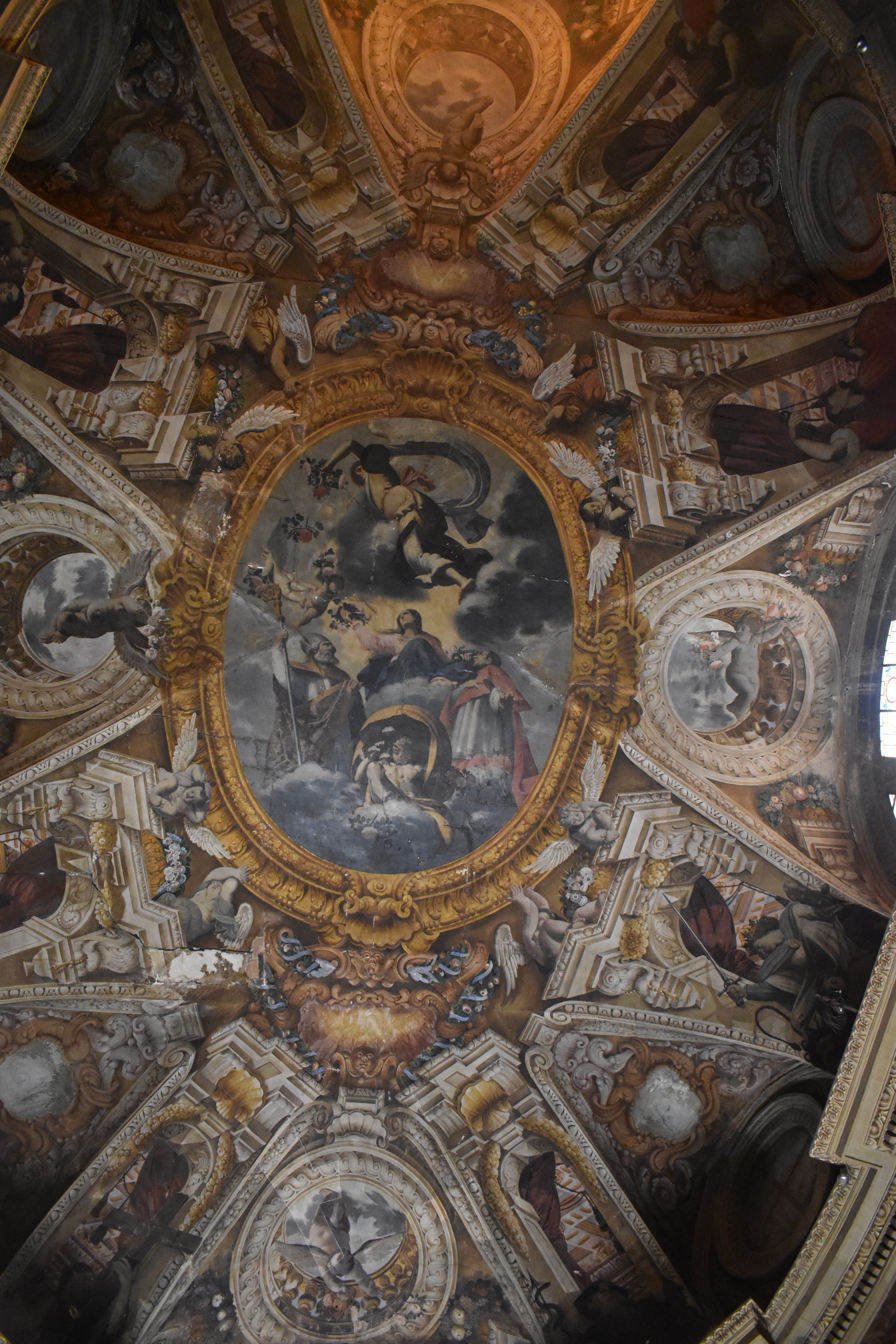
Giuseppe Avanzi, Glory of the Virgin with Saints Maurelio and Carlo Borromeo (1674)

An inventory from 1773 noted to the right of the main altar is the altarpiece of the Virgin and Saints George, Maurelio, and Dominic by Domenico, son of Tintoretto. The four paintings of the Life of the St Carlo were painted by Carlo Borfatti.

== See also ==
- 17th-century Western domes
