= Giovanni Gaibazzi =

Italian painter (1808–1888)

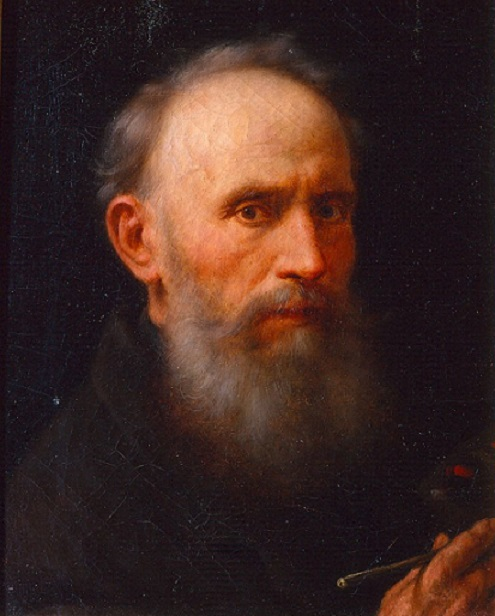
Giovanni Gaibazzi

Giovanni Gaibazzi (1808 – 1888) was an Italian painter, depicting mythologic and sacred subjects, as well as portraits.

He trained in his native Parma, at the city's Academy of Fine Arts under Giovanni Tebaldi. He moved to Rome, and returned to Parma in 1840 where he was named professor of the Academy. He completed portraits of the ruling family and painted altarpieces for the church of Santa Maria del Quartiere, Parma.
