= Pietro Melchiorre Ferrari =

Italian painter (1735–1787)

Pietro Melchiorre Ferrari (1735–1787) was an Italian painter, active mainly in Parma in a late-Baroque and early Neoclassical style.

He was born in Sissa in the Province of Parma; his father, Paolo, was a painter in the Ducal court. Pietro studied under Giuseppe Peroni, and later in the Academy of Fine Arts at Parma under Giuseppe Baldrighi.
