= Donnino Pozzi =

Italian painter (1894–1946)

Donnino Pozzi (1894 – 1946) was an Italian painter, known for his still-life works, but also for sacred subjects, frescoes, and portraits.

== Biography ==
He moved to Parma with his mother as a boy. In 1917, he enrolled at the Accademia di Belle Arti di Parma as a pupil of Daniele de Strobel. But soon stopped studies. He went on to collaborate with Carlo Casanova in some fresco decorations for the Basilica di Sant'Antonio in Padua. In 1928, he travelled to Milan, then moved to Milan, where he lived until 1940, when he moved back to Parma. He painted canvases for the church of San Vitale and Santa Cristina in Parma,

== Bibliography ==
- R. Lasagni, Dizionario biografico dei Parmigiani. ed. PPS, Parma 1999
- Baldassarre Molossi, Dizionario biografico dei parmigiani grandi e piccini, Parma 1957
- Gazzetta di Parma del 22 aprile 1997, inserto.
- Derived from Italian Wikipedia article.
