= Palazzo Bentivoglio, Ferrara =

Coordinates: 44.8380°N 11.6149°E

The Palazzo Bentivoglio is a late-Renaissance palace located on Via Garibaldi in central Ferrara, Region of Emilia-Romagna, Italy

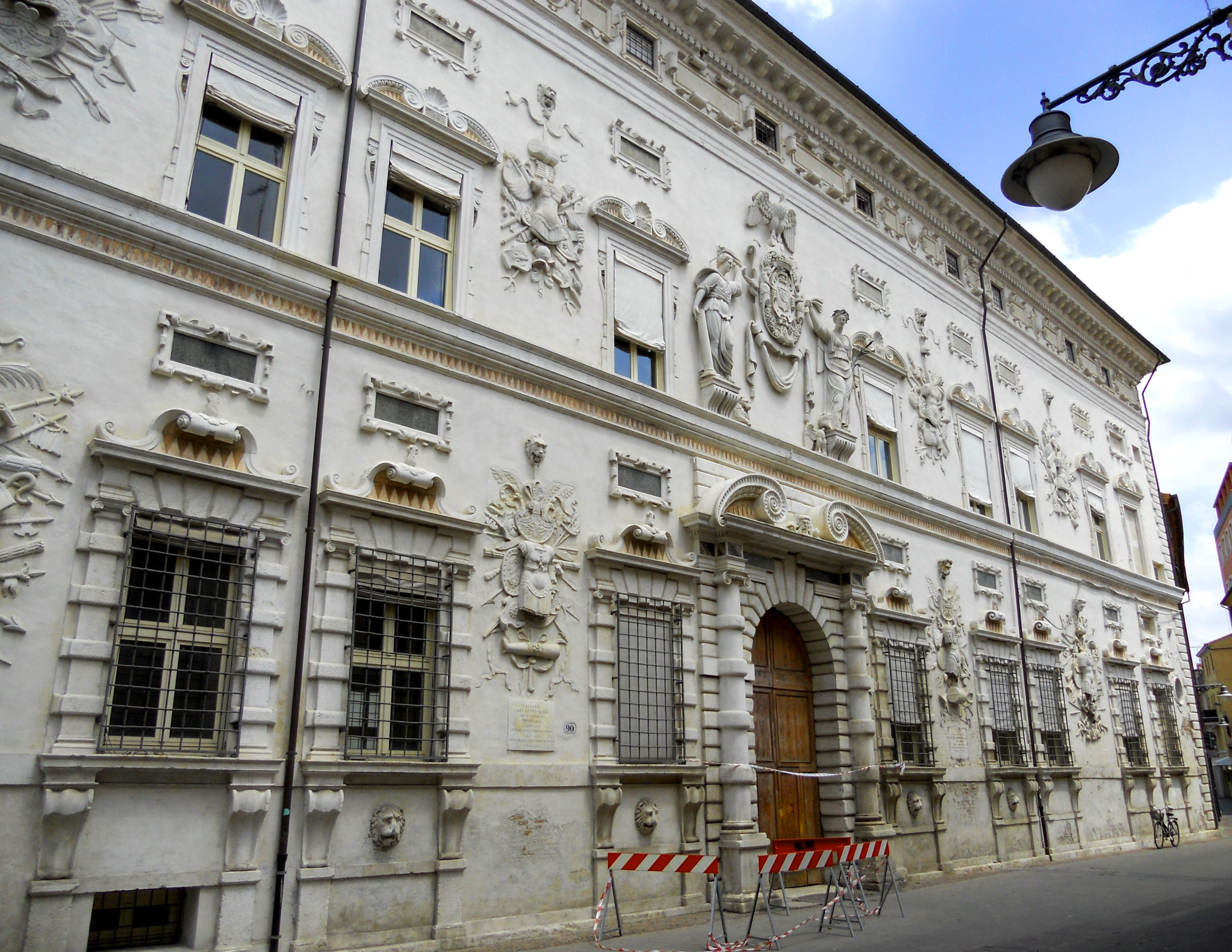
Facade of Palace.

== History ==
The palace was first commissioned by Borso d'Este in 1449, and gifted to his supporter, Pellegrino Pasino, who then sold it to the Roverelli family, and they in turn to Cornelio Bentivoglio marchese di Gualtieri e Generale del Duca Alfonso II in 1583. The design of the facade has been attributed to a combination of Pirro Ligorio and Giovanni Battista Aleotti.

Bentivoglio decorated the facade with military trophy symbols in marble; the exuberance of the decoration asserts the Mannerist style of the architecture. The pilasters are banded, small framed windows above the ground-floor, volutes prop above the entrance, and curved scrolls above the windows.

The palace remained property of the Bentivoglio family until the 19th century. For a time, it housed a tribunal in Ferrara. It now has private offices.
