= Palazzo del Governatore, Parma =

Coordinates: 44.80183°N 10.32804°E

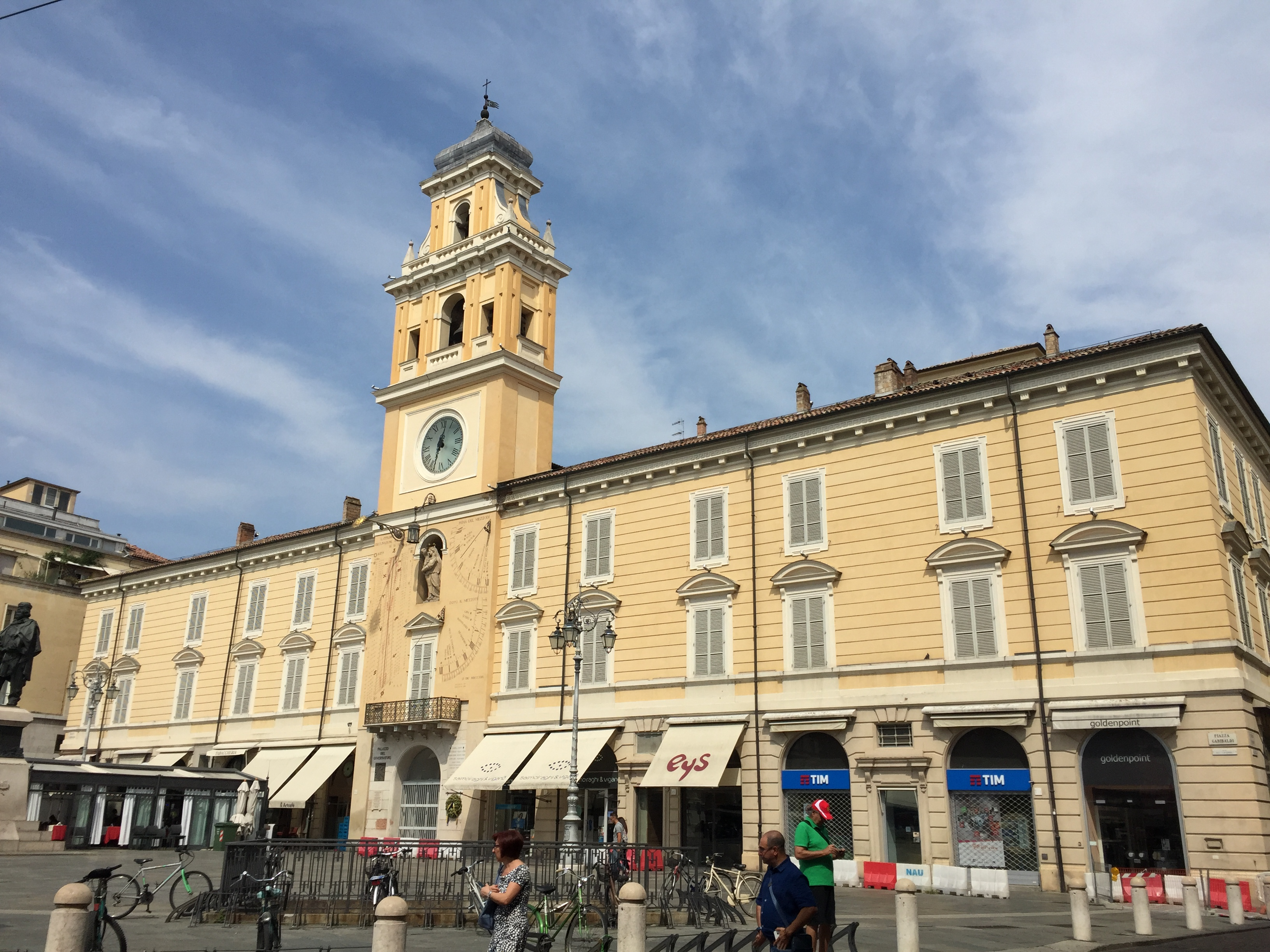
The clock tower of the Palazzo del Governatore in Piazza Garibaldi

The Palazzo del Governatore ("Palace of the Governor") is a monumental building located in Piazza Garibaldi forming part of the civic center of Parma, region of Emilia Romagna, Italy. The building still houses municipal offices, as well as hosting cultural and social events. Across the Piazza Garibaldi (and the busy intersections of Stradas Mazzini, della Republica, Cavour and Luigi Carlo Farini) are a number of other prominent buildings including the Palazzi del Podesta and del Comune, and the neoclassical Church of San Pietro Apostolo.

== History ==
A brick palace at the site was first erected in 1283, consisting of two wings separated by an alleyway. The palace housed formerly the lord, and then Governor of the town. Over the years it was occupied by various magistrates and legates for the commune. In 1606, after the collapse of a central bell-tower, the structure underwent reconstruction. The present bell-tower was erected in 1673 by the engineer Giovanni Battista Barattieri. On the façade, below the clock, is a niche with a statue depicting the Madonna being crowned by the child Jesus by Jean-Baptiste Boudard. Surrounding the statue are three sundials commissioned in 1829 by the Marie Louise, Duchess of Parma. Previously the niche held a 16th-century fresco depicting the crowned Virgin painted by Jacopo Bertoia.

To the right of the door is affixed a plaque with the name of seven members of the Antifascist resistance who were executed on September 1, 1944, by a firing squad in this Piazza by the local Black Brigade. The brigade shot the prisoners in retaliation for the assassination of Brenno Monardi, local fascist leader by partisans.

The present appearance of the façade is due to a Neoclassical refurbishment in the late 18th-century by E.A. Petitot. The piazza in front of the palace once held a Monument to the Ara Amicitiae (1769), also designed by Petitot, but it has been substituted by a statue of Giuseppe Garibaldi, by Davide Calandra.
