= Santa Maria del Quartiere, Parma =

Church building in Parma, Italy

Coordinates: 44°48′4.24″N 10°18′58.95″E

Church of St Mary of the Barracks; Chiesa di Santa Maria del Quartiere (Italian)
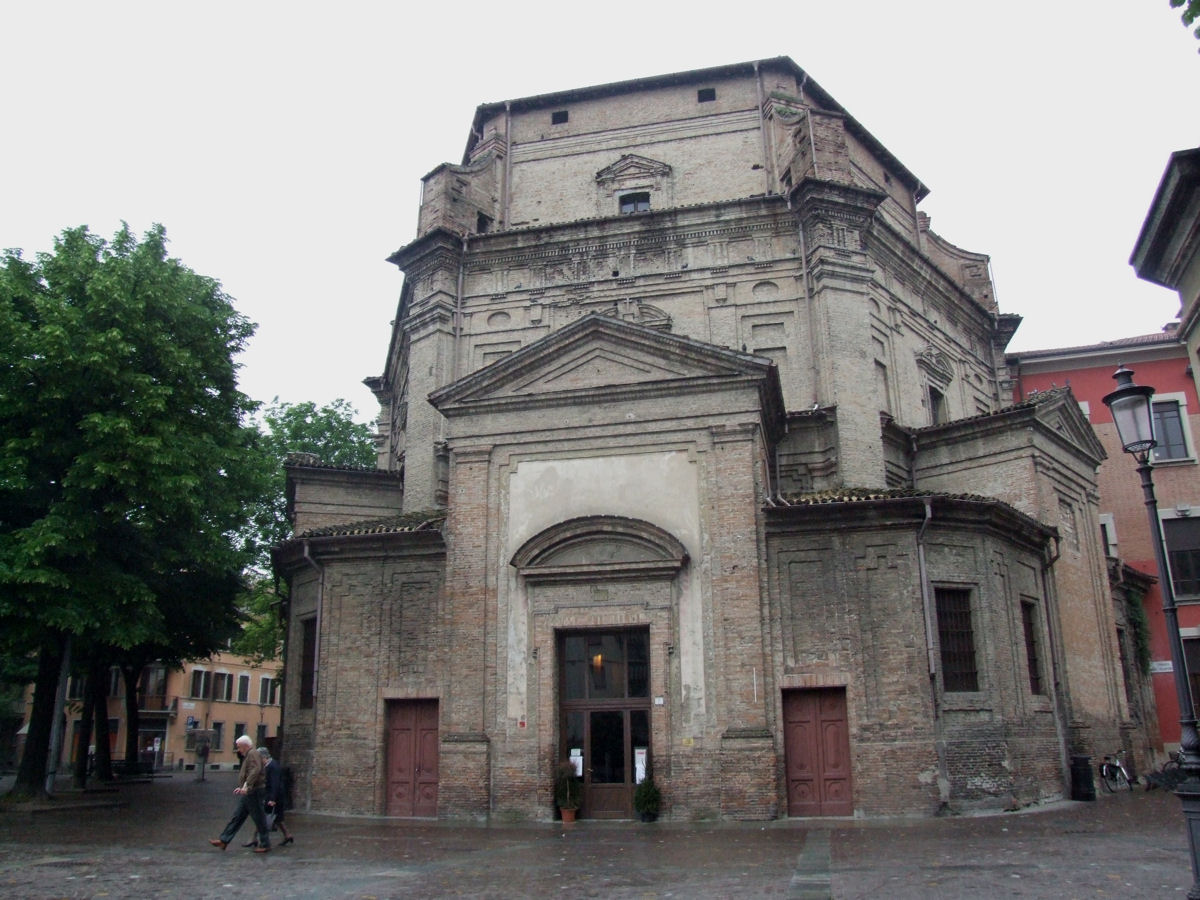
- Santa Maria del Quartiere

Religion
- Affiliation: Catholic
- Year consecrated: 1619

Location
- Location: Parma, Italy
- Interactive map of: Church of St Mary of the Barracks; Chiesa di Santa Maria del Quartiere (Italian)

Architecture
- Architect: Giovan Battista Aleotti
- Style: Baroque
- Groundbreaking: 1604

Santa Maria del Quartiere is a Baroque-style church in the quarter of the Oltretorrente of the city of Parma, Italy.

== History ==
The church was built inside the medieval walls from 1604 to 1619, on the site of a prior chapel dedicated to Mary, adjacent to the quarters for troops of the Duchy, hence its name. The design has been attributed to the Ferrarese architect Giovan Battista Aleotti. Atypical for most post-Reformation rectangular church naves, the nave of this church is a centralized hexagonal plan, which is more consistent with its role as a votive church built to honor an icon.

The presbytery includes a ceiling fresco (1626) depicting Samuel anointing David as King by Giulio Orlandini. Above the main altar is the fresco depicting the lactating Madonna painted by Mercurio Baiardi.

The cupola at the center of the church has a large and teeming fresco of the Trinity with angels and with the Ascended Virgin and Saints in Paradise (1626-1629), a work by Pier Antonio Bernabei and his pupils: his brother Alessandro and Giovanni Maria Conti della Camera.

The decoration of the chapels occurred mainly in the nineteenth century, and includes works by Tommaso Bandini, Giovanni Gaibazzi, and Francesco Pescatori. The second chapel on the right has an altarpiece depicting the Presentation at the Temple by Francesco Scaramuzza.

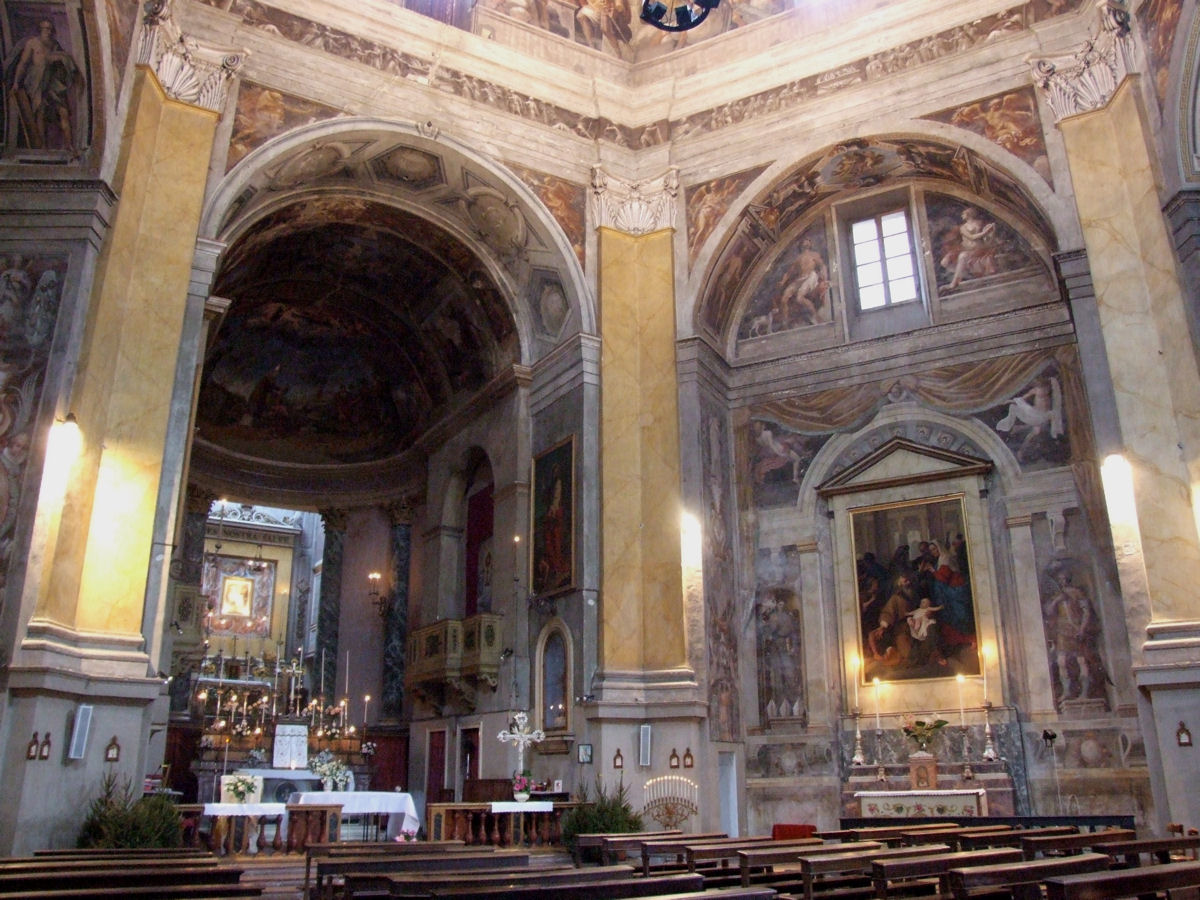
View of the presbytery (left) and second chapel with Scaramuzza altarpiece.

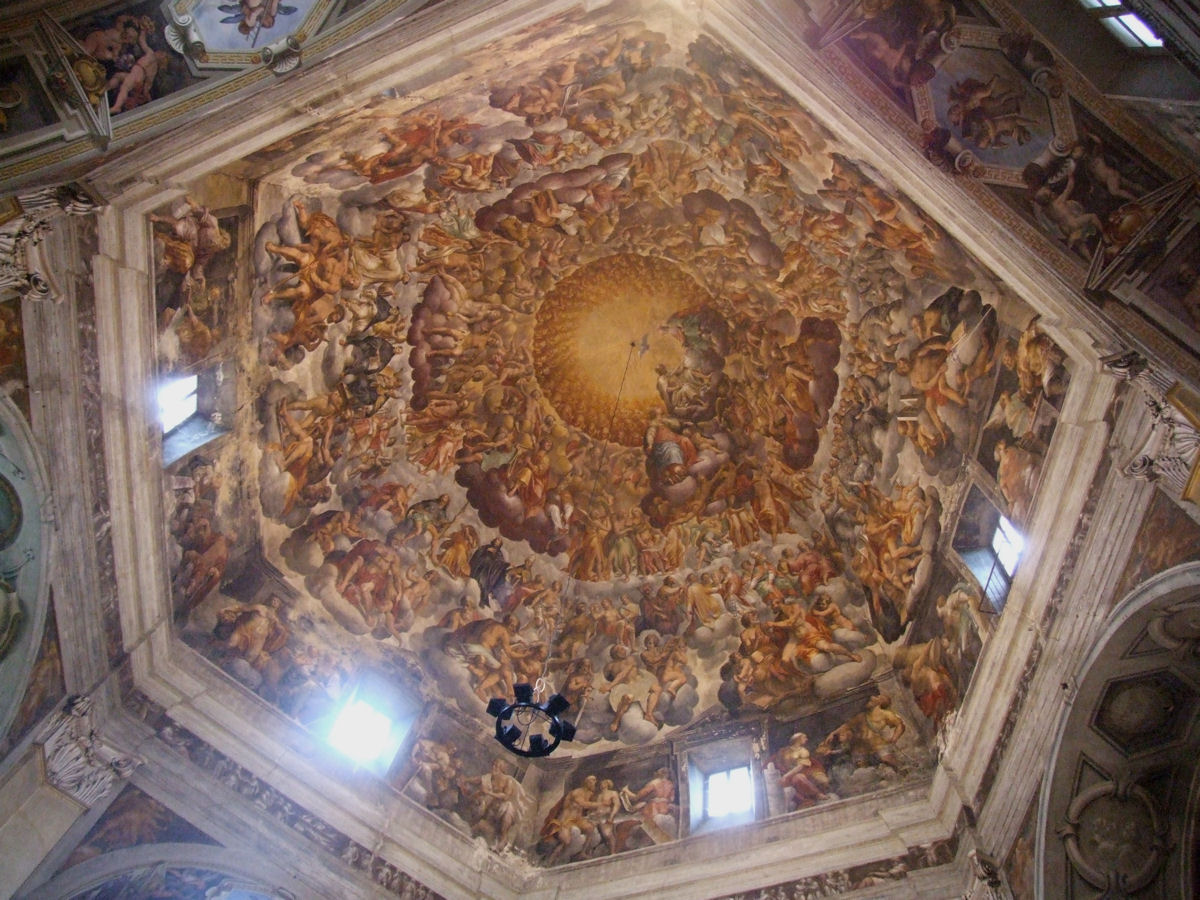
Cupola Frescoes

== See also ==
- 17th-century Western domes
