= Palazzo Bevilacqua-Costabili =

Coordinates: 44.8354°N 11.6225°E

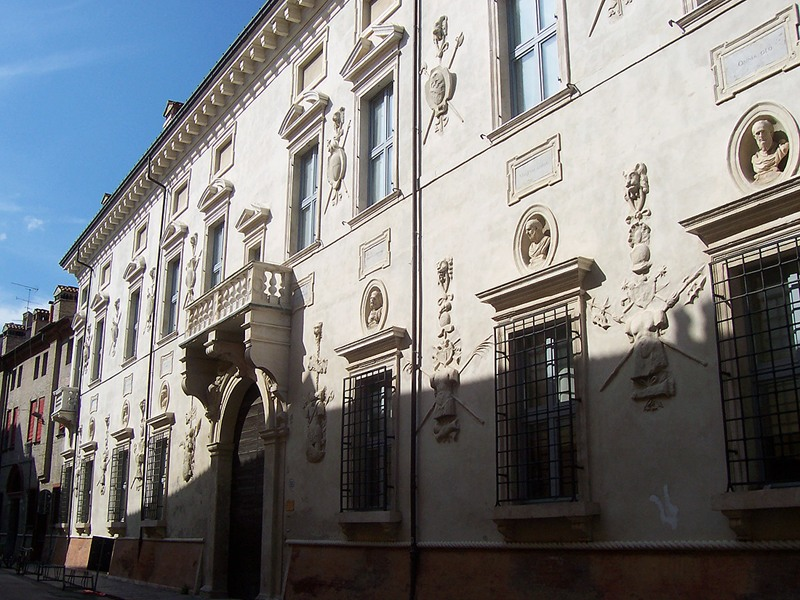
Facade of Palace.

The Palazzo Bevilacqua-Costabili is a Renaissance palace located on Via Voltapaletto 11 in central Ferrara, Region of Emilia-Romagna, Italy. It should not be confused with the Palazzo Bevilacqua in Verona (begun 1529), designed by Michele Sanmicheli.

== History ==
The palace was first commissioned by the Bevilacqua-Aldobrandini family in 1430 after the marriage of Cristin Francesco Bevilacqua and Lucia Ariosti. The initial facade design is attributed to Giovanni Battista Aleotti. In 1602, the palace was inhabited by Cardinal Bonifacio Bevilacqua, and in 1710, by Ercole Bevilacqua, Judge in Ferrara.

In 1830 the marchese Giovan Battista Costabili Containi bought and restored the palace. In 1916, count Francesco Mazza acquired the palace and it underwent multiple transitions and included a mental institute, supermarket, and movie theater. In 2006, the palace reopened after restoration; it is now home to the faculty of economics of the University of Ferrara. The piano nobile still has frescoed rooms, including some by Francesco Saraceni.
