= Palazzo del Comune, Parma =

Coordinates: 44.80130°N 10.32859°E

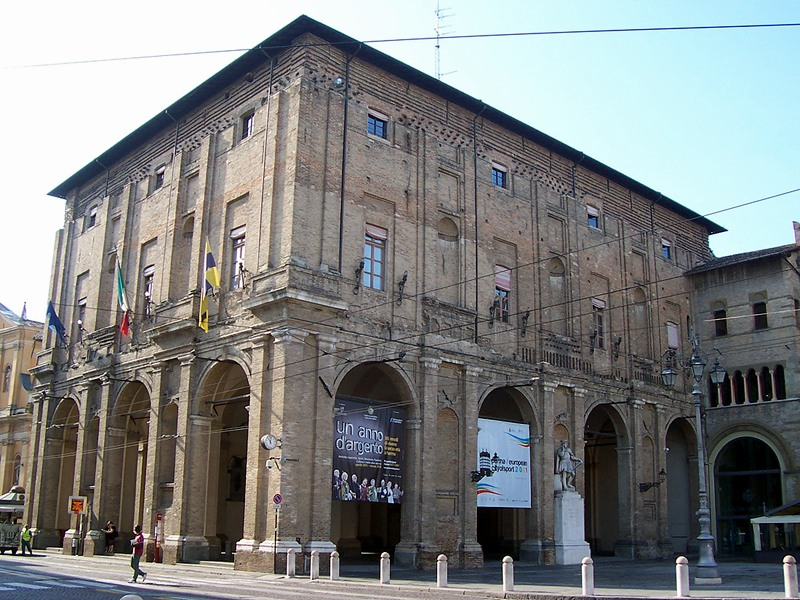
Palazzo del Comune

The Palazzo del Comune ("Palace of the Commune or Municipality") is a monumental building located in Piazza Garibaldi forming part of the civic center of Parma, region of Emilia Romagna, Italy. The building houses municipal offices. Across the Piazza Garibaldi (and the busy intersections of Stradas Mazzini, della Republica, Cavour and Luigi Carlo Farini) are a number of other prominent buildings including the Palazzi del Podesta and del Governatore, and the neoclassical Church of San Pietro Apostolo.

== History ==
The present late-Renaissance-style facade facing the piazza remains in unclad brick (typically the brick would have been covered by either stone or plaster. The present structure, with its tall open arcades, was designed starting in 1627 by Giovanni Battista Magnani, but only completed by 1673, without its external decoration.

The adjacent, and linked, crenellated Gothic-style Palazzo della Podesta (built 1221–1240) gives a sense of the style of the building erected originally at this site between 1281 and 1282. The prior palace (Palazzo del Capitano del Popolo) had a tall tower build behind the facade and housed the town jail ("della Camusina"). However, the tower suffered a catastrophic collapse on January 27, 1606, killing 26 persons.

The 17th-century reconstruction proceeded slowly, and the building was used for various civic, business, and military purposes. Over the centuries the structure it also acquired some commemorative decoration. In the 19th-century refurbishments were pursued by Girolamo Magnani and Sante Marco. In 1829, on the facade facing the nearby church of San Vitale, Paolo Toschi installed a fountain surmounted in the niche by a copy of the statuary group depicting Hercules and Anteus (1684–1687) sculpted by Teodoro Vandersturck originally for the Palazzo del Giardino and now displayed in the courtyard of the Palazzo Cusani. In 1870, the city, in an expression of civic pride, installed a monument to the painter Correggio, sculpted by Agostino Ferrarini. On the pilasters of the ground floor portico were a number of plaques, including one (1903) memorializing those fallen in the wars in the colonies of Libya, Somalia, and Ethiopia during the 19th century, completed by Alessandro Marzaroli. Another plaque honors Giuseppe Mazzini (1887) completed by Giovanni Chierici.

Inside, the Council Hall was frescoed by Girolamo Magnani and Cecrope Barilli in 1885–86. The building displays paintings by Annibale Carracci, Ilario Spolverini, and Gervasio and Bernardino Gatti.
