= Giulio Orlandini =

Italian painter

Giulio Orlandini (active early 17th century) was an Italian painter active in his native Parma. He worked alongside Fortunato Gatti and Giovanni Maria Conti. He painted in the presbytery of the church of Santa Maria del Quartiere, Parma.
