= Stanislao Campana =

Italian painter (1794 – 1864)

Stanislao Campana (1794 – 1864) was an Italian painter, depicting historic-mythologic and sacred subjects.

== Biography ==
He was born in Pannocchia, but trained in his native Parma at the city's Istituto Toschi, under Biagio Martini

He painted a Death of Meleagro (1822) which him a stipend to travel to Rome. He returned in 1828 and painted episodes of the works of Torquato Tasso for the main hall of the Biblioteca Palatina. He painted an altarpiece depicting the Madonna and Child, St Michael and the Devil disputing the souls of the Purgatory (1835) for the church of San Michele, and a Deposition (1828) commissioned by Duchess Maria Luisa, and on display at the Palazzo Vescovile. In 1832, he became professor at the Academy of Fine Arts, and in 1847, superintendent of the Ducal Galleries.
