= Tommaso Gasparotti =

Italian painter

Tommaso Gasparotti (1785 – December 1847) was an Italian poet, painter, paleographist and bibibliophile archivist in Parma.

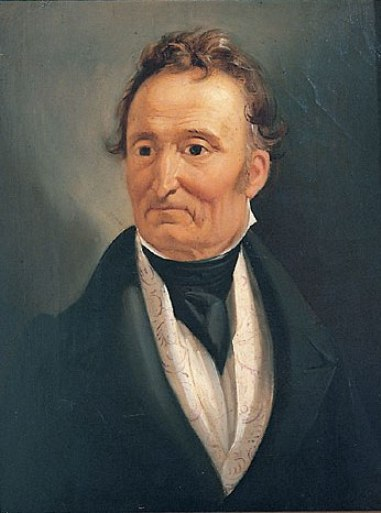
Portrait of Tommaso Gasparotti by Giovanni Battista Borghesi

He was born in Parma, son of a painter, who trained with Biagio Martini. He trained under Martini alongside Giovanni Battista Borghesi. He also studied ancient Latin and Italian inscriptions. He was adept at manuscript illumination. In 1808, he worked for the Archivio Farnesiano in Parma, and became director from 1814 till his death. He organized the state archive of Parma, including its diplomatic correspondence.
