= Gaetano Signorini =

Italian painter (1806–1872)

Gaetano Signorini (1806 – 1872) was an Italian painter, active mainly in Parma in depictions of portraits, history, and sacred subjects.

== Biography ==
He was born in Luzzara di Reggio Emilia, the son of the Carlo Signorini. He taught at the Academy of Fine Arts of Parma. Among the subjects of his portraits are:

- Jacopo Sanvitale
- Luciano Gasparotti
- Count Carlo di Bombelles
- Count Jacopo Sanvitale
- Marchese Paris Boschi
- Count di Chambord
- Carlo di Bombelles
