= Gasparotto =

Gasparotto is an Italian surname. Notable people with the surname include:

- Enrico Gasparotto (born 1982), Italian cyclist
- Gabriel Gasparotto (born 1993), Brazilian footballer
- Guy Gasparotto (born 1948), French rugby union player
- Leopoldo Gasparotto (1902-1944), Italian mountaineer and Resistance leader during World War II
- Luca Gasparotto (born 1995), Canadian soccer player
- Luigi Gasparotto (1873–1954), Italian lawyer and politician

== See also ==
- Gasparotti, a surname
