= Antonio Prati =

Italian painter

Antonio Prati (March 19, 1819 – February 20, 1909) was an Italian painter and scenographer.

== Biography ==
He began his art studies at the Istituto Gazzola in his native Piacenza, under professor Pietrogiorgi (Giuseppe Badiaschi), then moved to Parma under the professor Simone Cantoni. He worked as a scenographer for the theater of Parma with professor Girolamo Magnani. Prati also worked in the theaters of Reggio Emilia, Turin, and Mantua. Returning to Piacenza, he was employed by the Teatro Municipali, working along with Giuseppe Giorgi. He decorated with ornamentation, the chapel of Santa Francesca Romana, for the church of Sant'Antonino in Piacenza; and a chapel in the church of Santo Stefano also in Piacenza, and another in the church of Pontenure. He painted a quadratura frescoes in Casa Lucca in Piacenza, via Sopramuro, in the House of Del Guasto, and in the House of Doctor Missaga in Stradella, and the ceiling of Casa Mandelli in Piacenza, and in a room in Casa Lucca. His son was the painter Enrico Prati.

A 17th-century poet and composer named Antonio Maria Prati lived in Parma.
