= Biagio Martini =

Italian painter

Biagio Martini (5 February 1761 – 26 August 1840) was an Italian painter, active mainly in Parma in a Neoclassical style.

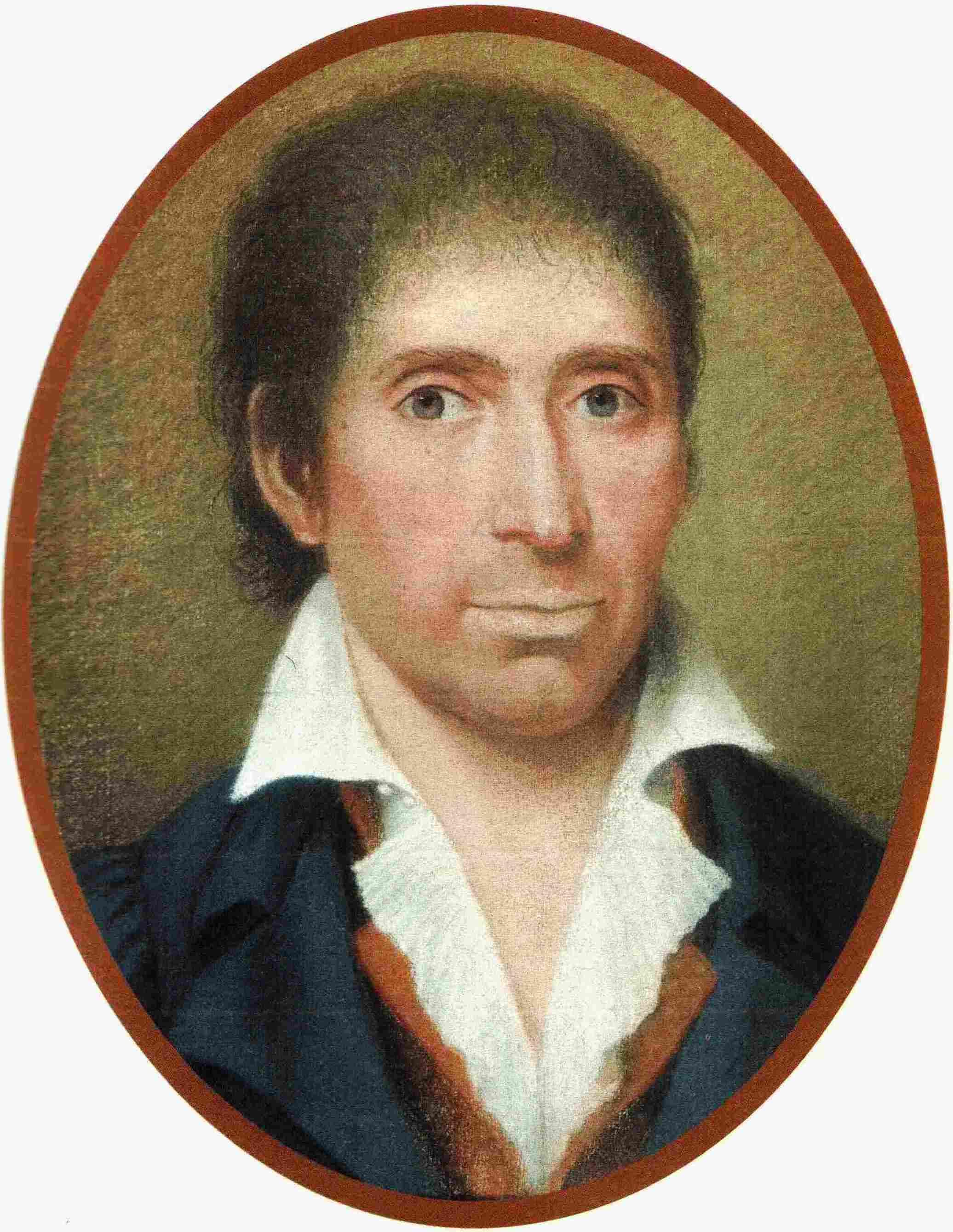
Self-portrait of Biagio Martini.

== Biography ==
Biagio Epaminonda Maria Martini was born at Parma, to the same family as the engraver Pietro Antonio Martini. Biagio was a pupil at the Parmesan Academy of Fine Arts under Gaetano Callani and Pietro Melchiorre Ferrari. He became a professor at the academy. At the academy, he is said to have taught design to Paolo Toschi. He married Costanza, who was also a painter and the daughter of Giuseppe Baldrighi. Giuseppe, who died in 1803, was court painter in Parma for the Bourbon Duke.

Among his works are a juvenile Diogenes in the Ducal collections, and a Death of Socrates which won a prize at the academy in 1791. He painted a Deposition for the Church of the Cappuccini in Parma. He also painted a Saints Gervaso and Protaso, and a Meeting of Pope Paul III with Emperor Charles V. He was awarded knighthood in the Ordine Costantiniano di San Giorgio by the Parmesan court.
