= Filippo Maria Galletti =

Italian painter (1636–1714)

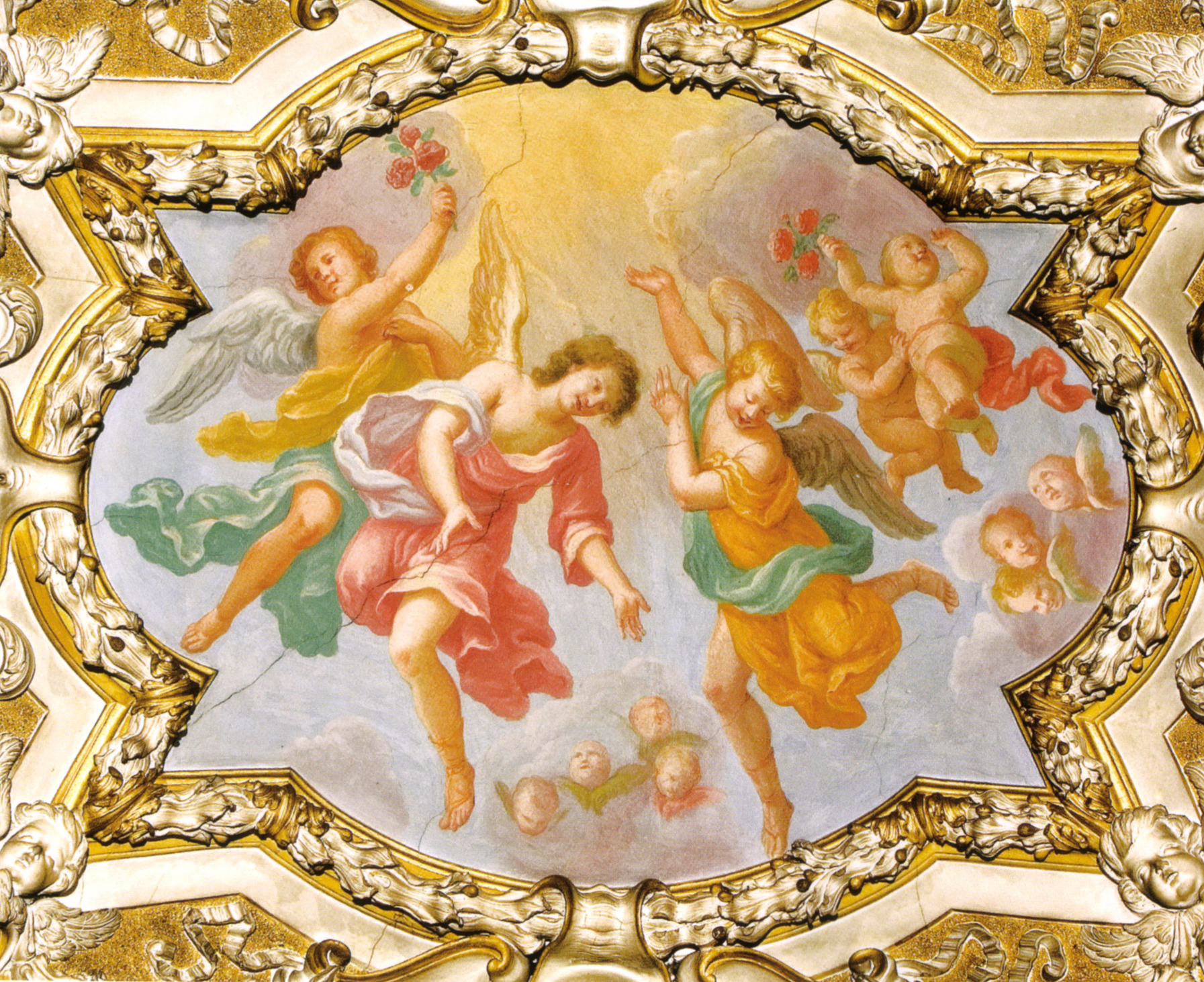
Filippo Maria Galletti, Angels

Filippo Maria Galletti (1636–1714) was an Italian painter of the Baroque period, active mainly in Tuscany, Parma, and Liguria. He was a pupil of the painter Ciro Ferri and Pietro Dandini. He became a Theatine priest, and painted religious works in Lecce (church of Santa Irene) and Livorno (Santuario de Montenero), and the church of Santa Lucia (Parma).

He worked with Pietro Caselli in Rome, painting the chapel with a fresco by Nucci in the church of San Silvestro al Quirinale. He was described as a pupil of Vincenzo Dandini and a follower of Ciro Ferri.

In 1672, he painted for the church of Santa Cristina, belonging to the Theatines, in Parma.

In 1674 he joined the Academy of Fine Arts of Florence. That same year he painted in the convent of San Bartolomeo in Rovigo. In 1678 he worked on the cupola of the church of Santi Michele and Gaetano in Florence. In 1679, he frescoed for the Sanctuary of the Madonna del Montenero near Livorno. In 1692, he entered the convent of San Gaetano in Brescia, and completed an altarpiece of the saint for the church. In 1696, he painted again for the choir of the church of San Vincenzo Martire in Modena. in 1703, he painted an altarpiece of the Madonna and child with San Girolamo Minai for the church of San Gaggio in Florence.
