= Santa Cristina, Parma =

Roman Catholic church in Emilia-Romagna, Italy

Coordinates: 44.80080°N 10.33112°E

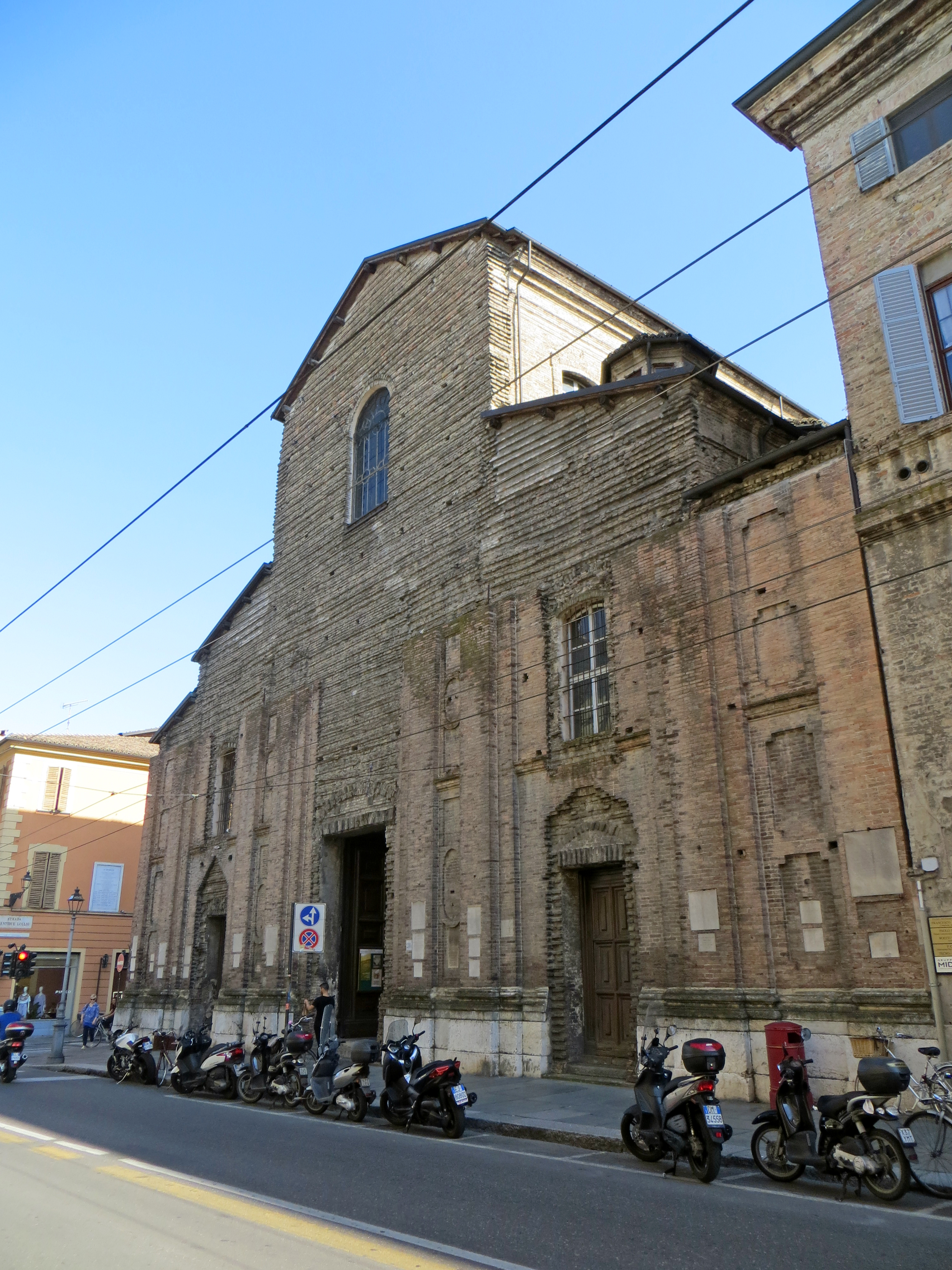
Facade of Santa Cristina

Santa Cristina is a Baroque-style, Roman Catholic church located on via Repubblica in Parma, region of Emilia-Romagna, Italy.

== History ==
The present church of Santa Cristina and its adjacent monastery were erected at the site of some ruined building and a 10th-century parish church of San Siro. This marked the eastern limit of Parma, and was the name attached to the gate of the town leading to Reggio. With the patronage of the Duchess Margherita Aldobrandini, widow of Ranuccio I Farnese, in a bull dated 22 January 1629, the Pope Urban VIII Barberini entrusted the complex to the Theatine order. In 1649 the Theatines utilized a design which one of its members, Pietro Caracciolo, had developed for the church of San Vicenzo in Piacenza. Work continued until 1662 in the church, and the monastery till 1732. The Theatines remained here until 1805.

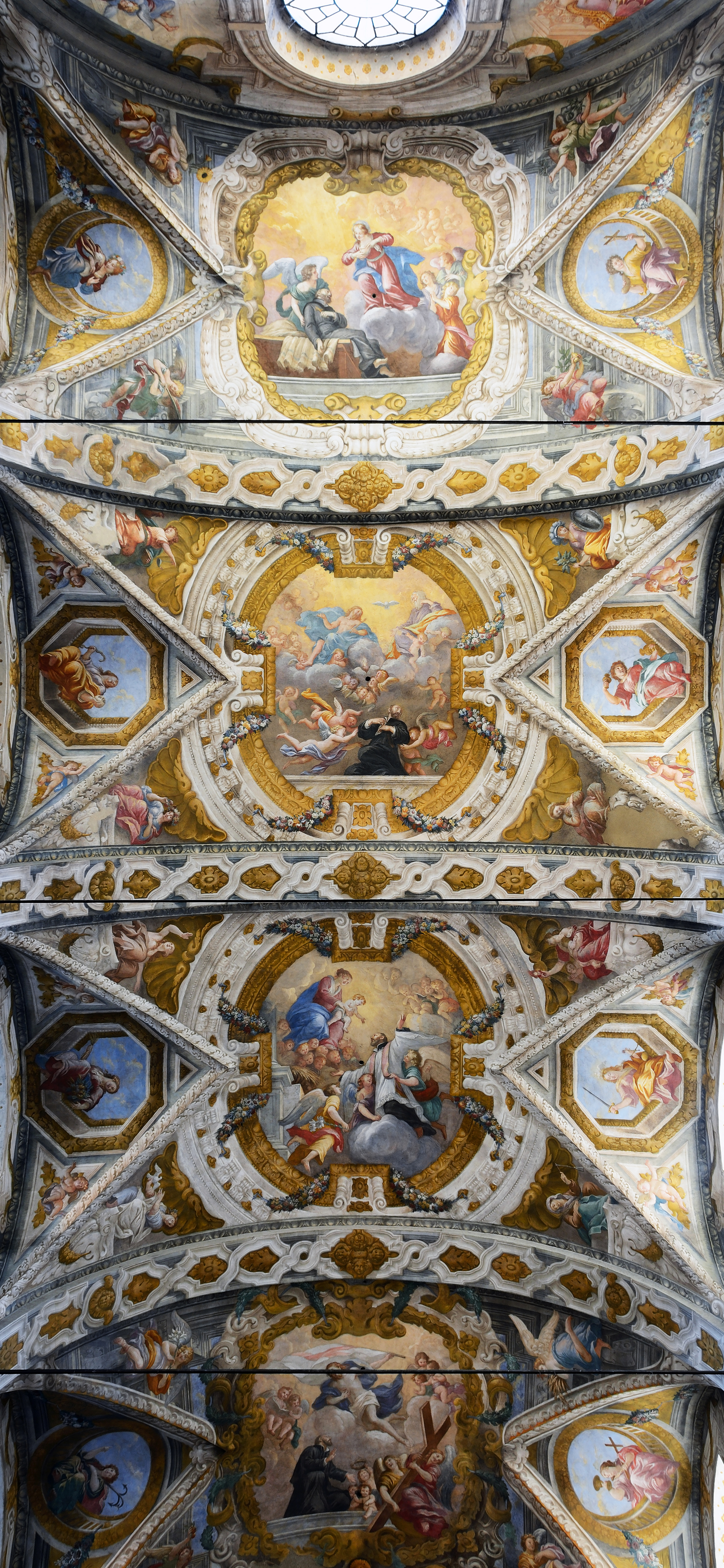
Ceiling frescoes by Alessandro Baratta

== Description ==
The building has three naves divided by pillars with Ionic capitals, with four chapels on each side in front of each of which opens a hemispherical dome. The facade and the apse remained unfinished. The interior was frescoed by the figure painter and Theatine Filippo Maria Galletti and quadratura by and other painting by Alessandro Baratta. Most of the altarpieces depicting the Life of the Virgin were painted by Giovanni Battista Venanzi, including the main altarpiece depicting the Martyrdom and Glory of Ste Cristina. The ceiling of the nave is decorated with four scenes from the life of St Cajetan: the Virgin appears to a dying St Cajetan, framed by allegories of Humility and Faith; Glory of St Cajetan before the Trinity, between allegories of Obedience and Temperance; Vision of the Virgin and Child to Cajetan during his first Mass, between Providence and Justice; and finally, Cajetan contemplates the signs of the Passion, between Hope and Charity.

In the side walls, on the sides of the windows that illuminate the central nave, are the figures of the apostles and evangelists and below, on the sides of the arches, those of the prophets .

Among the other paintings, are a Saint Nicolas by a follower of Lionello Spada, a Deposition by Donnino Pozzi; and the Glory of St Joseph with the blessed Theatine Paolo Burali, painted in 1722 by Francesco Nassi. The choir was added to the central door in 1720, with the organ built in 1764 by Antonio Poncini Negri, damaged in the bombings of 1944 and restored in 1983 by the Tamburini company from Asciano.
