= Mauro Oddi =

Italian painter and architect

Mauro Oddi (1639–c. 1702) was an Italian painter and architect of the Baroque period, active in the Duchy of Parma.

== Biography ==
He was born in 1639 at Parma, where he first trained. He went afterwards to Rome, where he studied six years, under Pietro da Cortona. On his return to his native city his talents recommended him to the patronage of the Duke of Parma, who employed him in ornamenting the ducal palace in Parma and the Palace of Colorno; giving him also the appointments of court painter and builder. He drew two thousand medals in the ducal cabinet of coins, and painted some altar-pieces for the churches of Parma, Piacenza, and Modena. Melchior Küsel and Nicolas Dorigny, and others have engraved after his works. Two etchings by him are also known, The Adoration of the Shepherds after Parmigiano and Jacopo Caraglio, and The Rape of Europa, after Agostino Carracci.
