= Giovanni Tebaldi =

Italian painter (1787–1852)

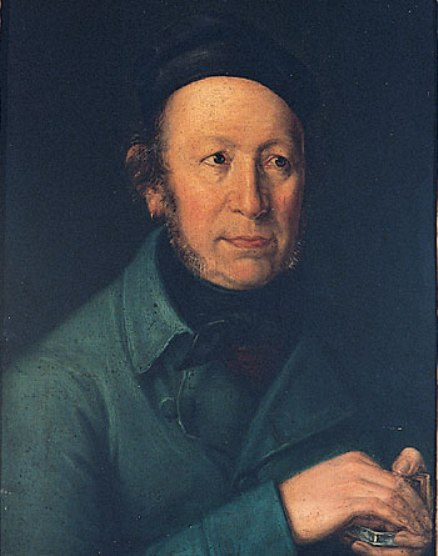
Giovanni Tebaldi (self-portrait)

Giovanni Tebaldi (1787–1852) was an Italian painter, active in a Neoclassical style.

== Biography ==
Born at Parma, he was a pupil of Pietro Antonio Martini as a boy, but studied in Rome for some years. He returned to Parma to become professor at the Academy of Fine Arts of Parma. Among his pupils were Enrico Bandini and Francesco Scaramuzza.
