= Giuseppe Baldrighi =

Italian painter (1722–1803)

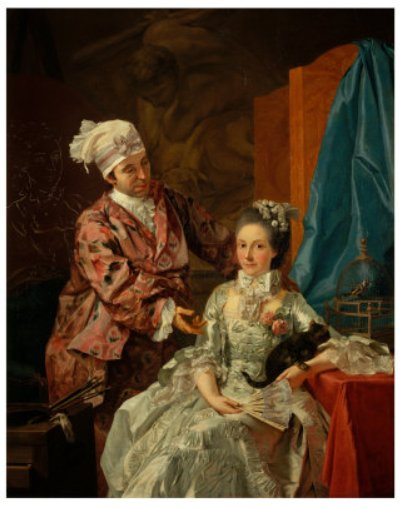
- Self-portrait with his Wife, Galleria nazionale di Parma
- Born: 12 August 1722; Stradella, Lombardy
- Died: 22 January 1803 (aged 80); Parma
- Known for: Painting
- Movement: Rococo; Neoclassicism
- Patrons: Guillaume du Tillot

Giuseppe Baldrighi (12 August 1722 – 22 January 1803) was an Italian painter of the late Baroque (Rococo) and early Neoclassic periods.

== Biography ==
=== Early life and education ===
Born in the town of Stradella, in Lombardy, Giuseppe Baldrighi initially trained with an unknown painter in Naples, where his family lived. By 1750, he was recruited into the Accademia Clementina of Bologna. He was the recruited to Parma, perhaps due to his skill at miniature paintings by Du Tillot, minister of Philip of Bourbon, and sent to study in Paris from 1752 to 1756.

Here, he likely encountered François Boucher, Maurice Quentin de La Tour, Joseph Duplessis, Joseph Duplessis, and Alexandre-François Desportes, and became known for his watercolors and portraits. His portraits include that of duchess Louise Elizabeth, now Museo Glauco Lombardi in Parma and a Portrait of Jacopo Sanvitale in Pastoral Dress in the Rocca of Fontanellato. In 1754 Baldrighi sent some overdoors to Parma, intended for the Palazzo Ducale. Two years later he was invited to exhibit one of his works at the Académie Royale, Paris, and presented a Roman Charity (Musée des Beaux-Arts d'Angers); this was much admired and won him admission to the prestigious Académie.

=== Court painter in Parma ===
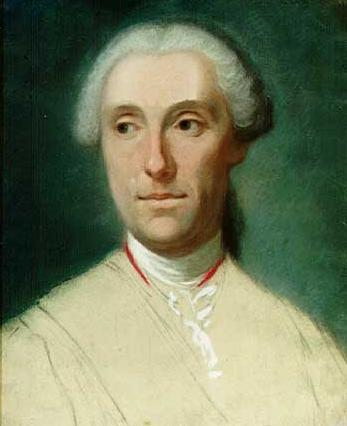
Portrait of Philip, Duke of Parma, pastel, ca. 1750s

When the news of this success reached Parma, the artist was invited to return there and be painter to Duke. Baldrighi took up this appointment at the end of 1756, and despite his ill health his best works date from this time. He actively painted portraits for the Ducal family and frescoed a Triumph of the Faith for the chapel of Colorno Palace in 1777. His Self-portrait with Callani and Ferrari (Galleria nazionale di Parma) is rich in echoes of French art, while the large portrait of Philip of Bourbon with his Family (1758–92; Galleria nazionale di Parma) attains a new ease and accomplishment. The portrait of the Artist with his Wife (Galleria nazionale di Parma), set in a lively and naturalistic domestic context, was painted a little later.

The freshness of Baldrighi’s portraiture slowly declined after his nomination as professor of the Academy of Fine Arts of Parma. His late works, such as the Hercules and Prometheus (Galleria nazionale di Parma), are painted in a cold academic style, and formality pervades his last portraits, such as those of Don Ferdinando (Parma, Ospedale della Misericordia) and Luigi Berri (Parma, Pinacoteca Stuard). Baldrighi died in Parma on 22 January 1803. In Spain The Prado, the Royal Palace of El Pardo and the Real Academia de Bellas Artes de San Fernando all of them in Madrid own paintings (portraits of Bourbons) by Baldrighi.

== Gallery ==
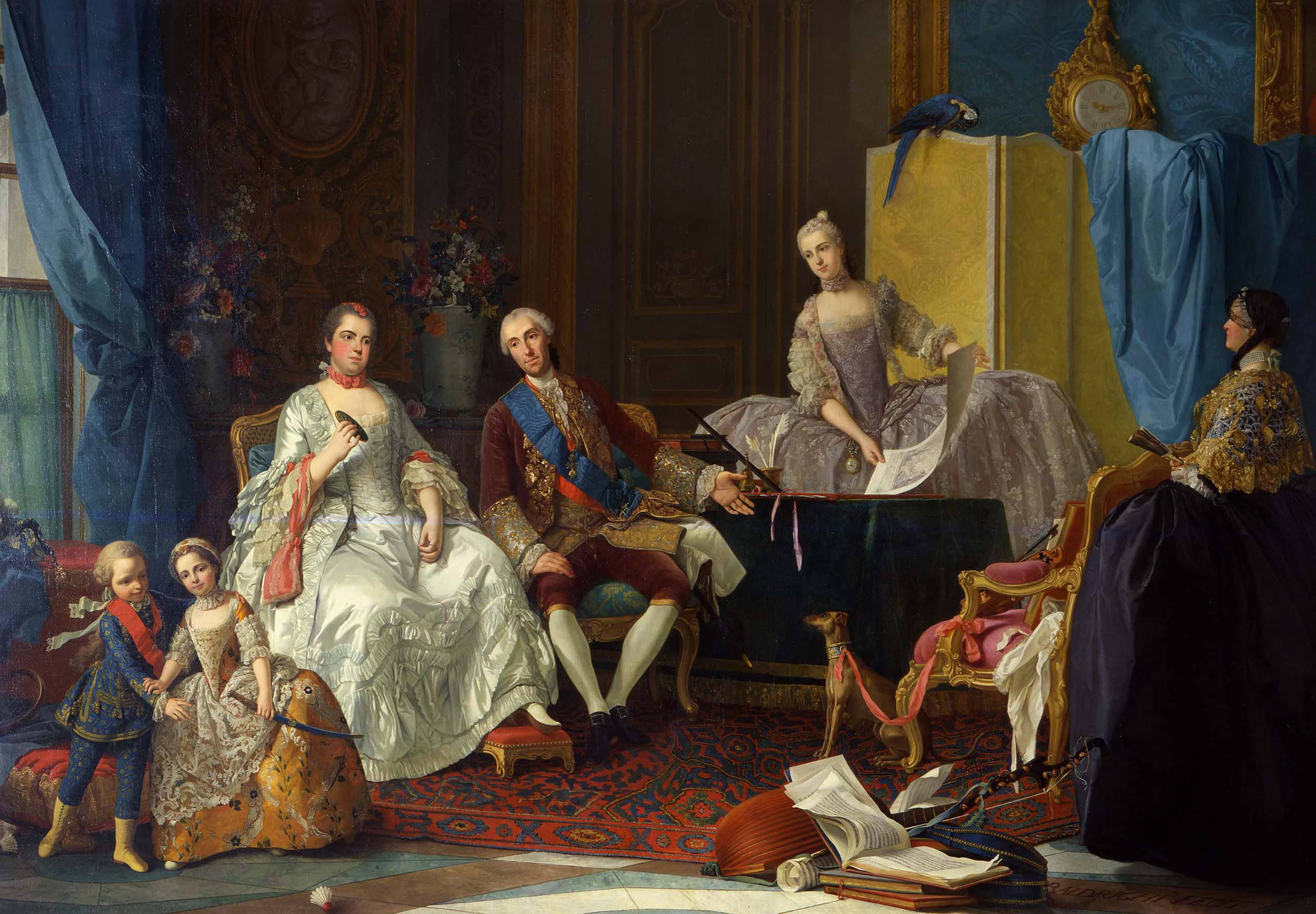
Family of Don Philip of Bourbon, 1757

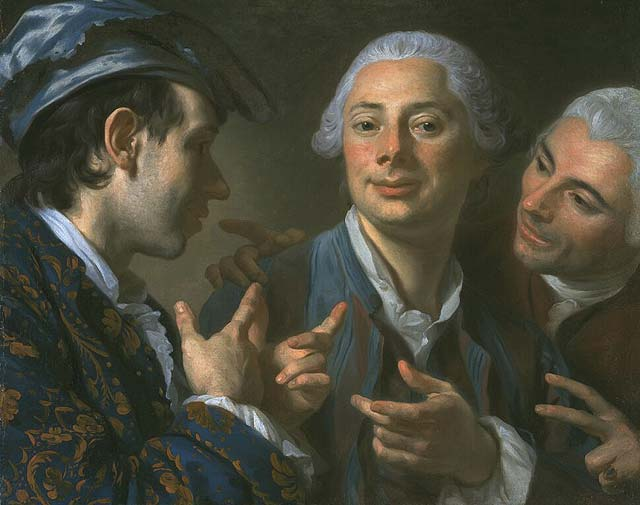
Self-portrait with two friends, pastel, 1751

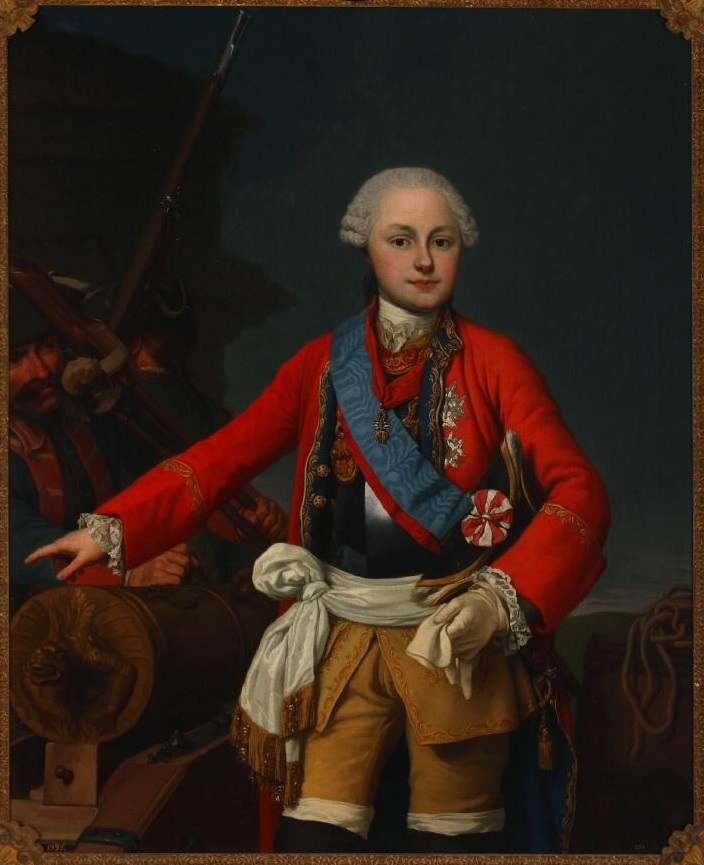
Ferdinand I of Parma, 1765-1775

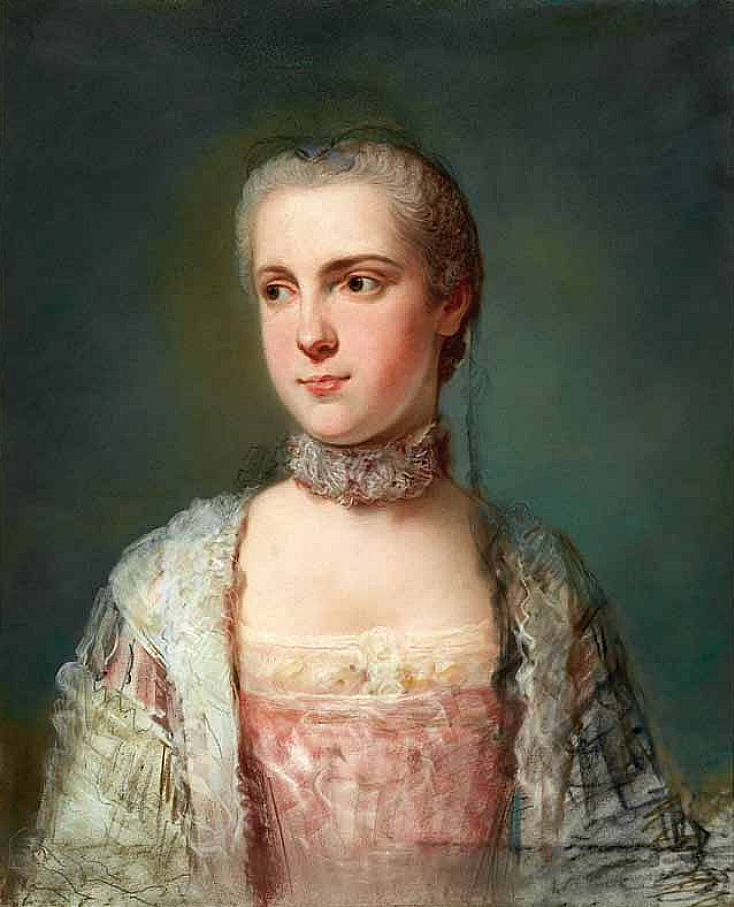
Isabella of Parma, pastel, c. 1765

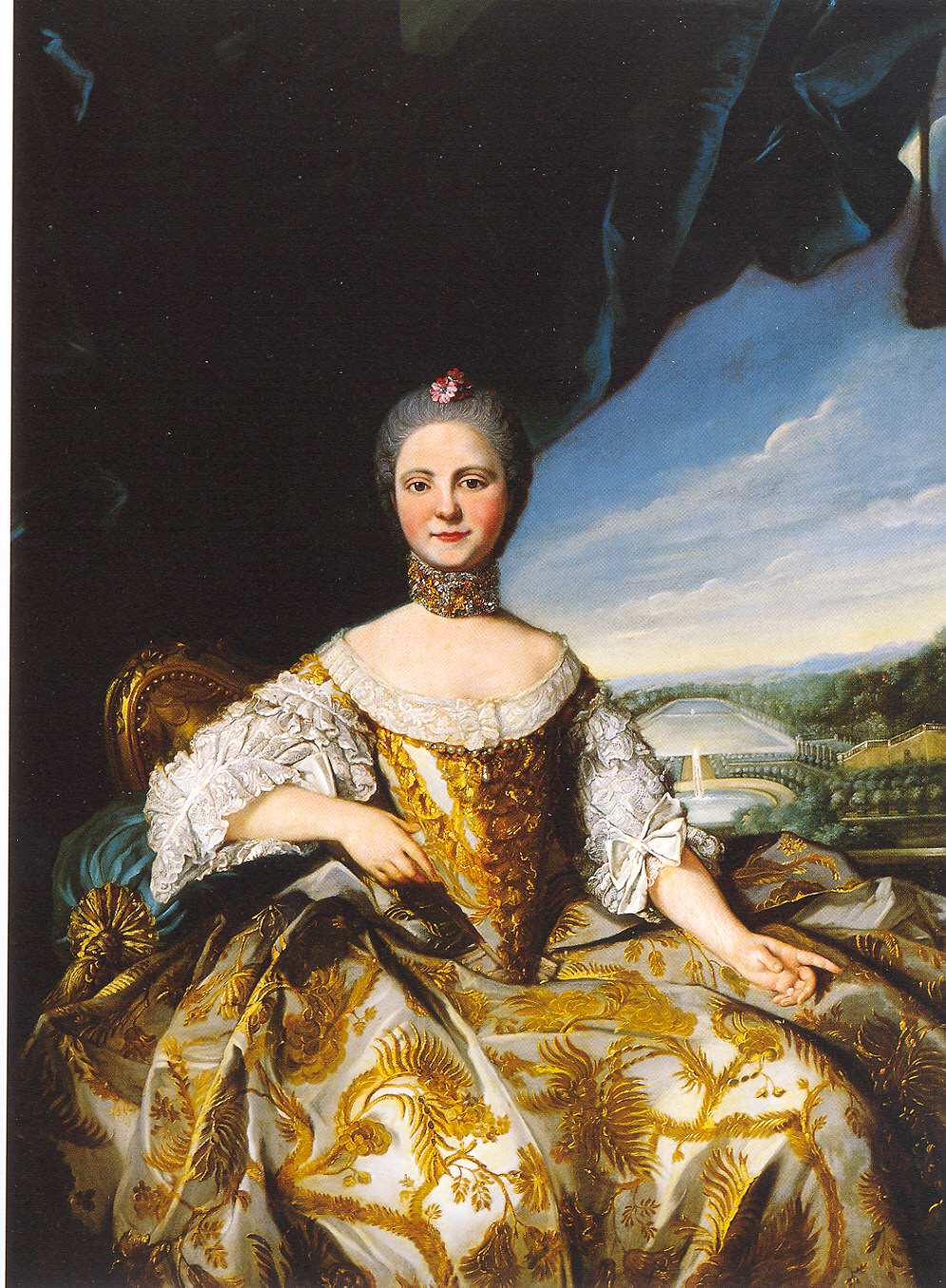
Maria Luisa of Parma, c. 1765

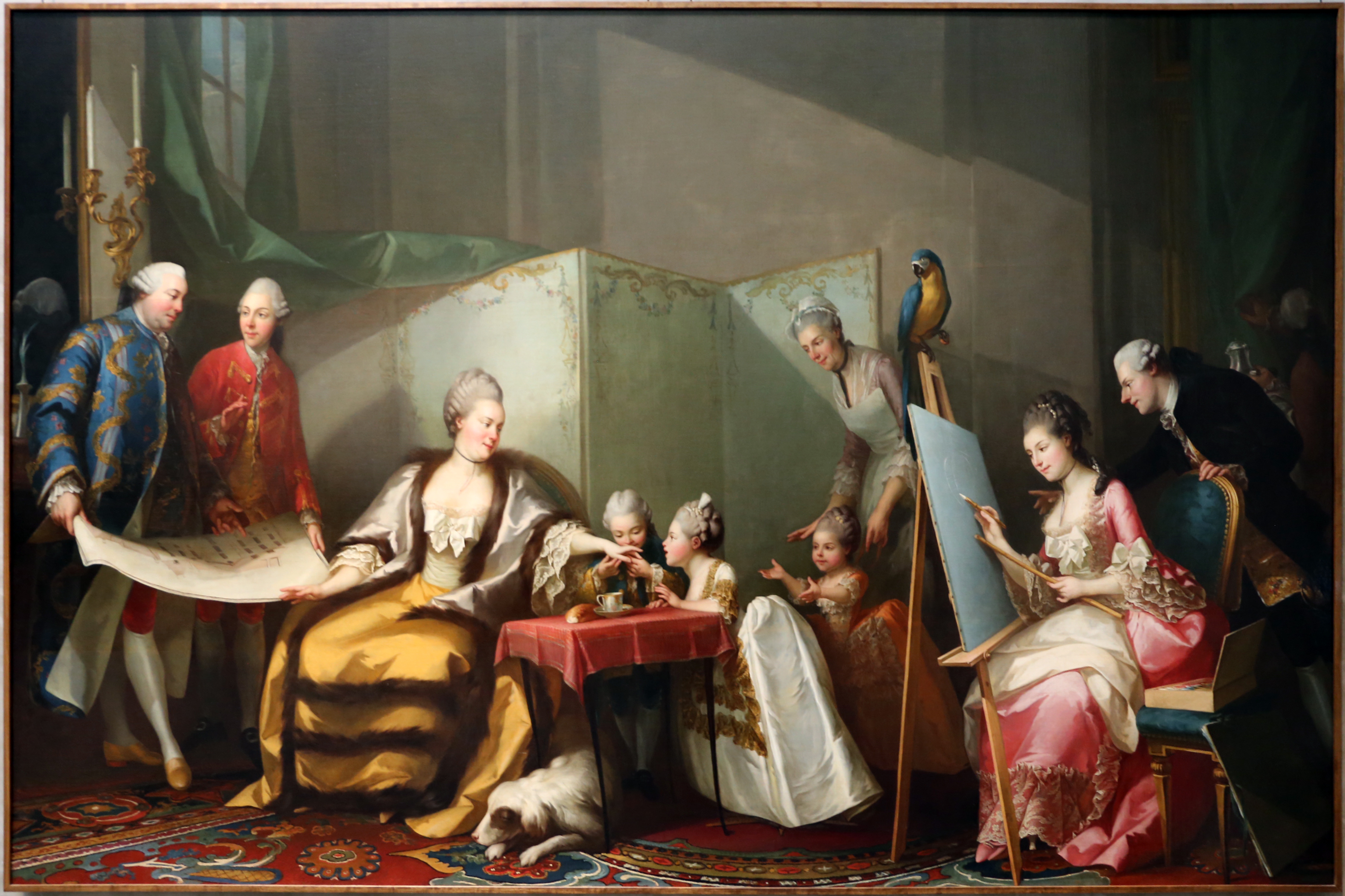
Ducal family of Parma, 1810

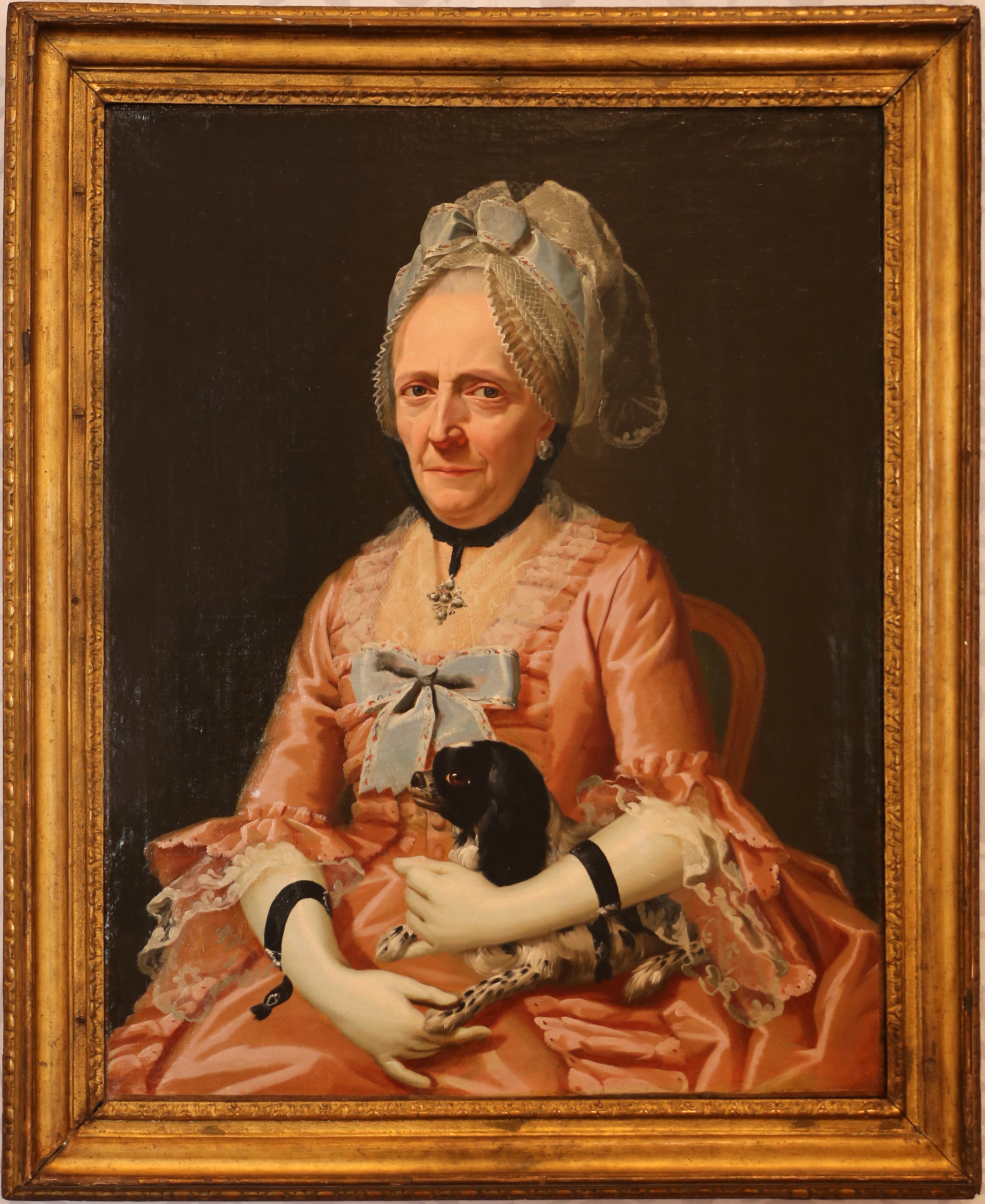
Old woman with her dog, c. 1765

== Sources ==
- Biography for Goya exhibition
- Fiere, lupi e cavalli: il bestiario dipinto di Giuseppe Baldrighi L'omaggio al pittore nel bicentenario della morte (Stradella 1722 - Parma 1803).
- Exhibit in Parma.
- Bryan, Michael (1886). Robert Edmund Graves (ed.). Dictionary of Painters and Engravers, Biographical and Critical. Vol. I: A-K. London: George Bell and Sons. p. 72.
