= Francesco Scaramuzza =

Italian painter and poet

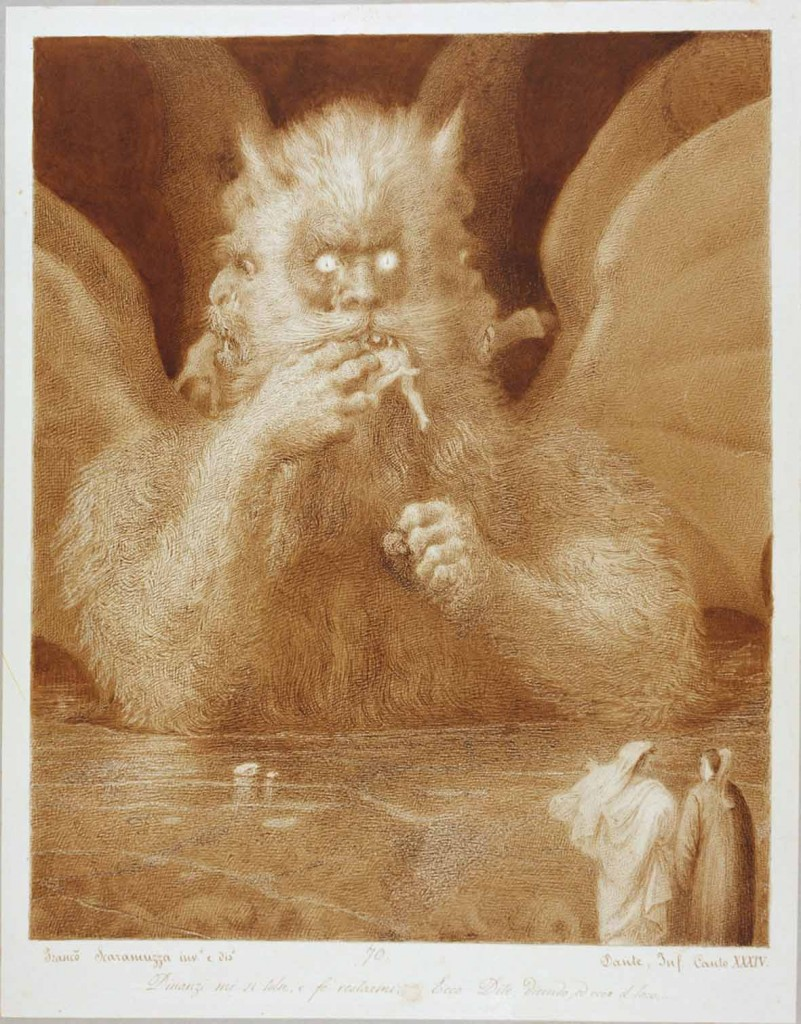
A depiction of Lucifer for Dante's Divine Comedy

Francesco Scaramuzza (14 July 1803 – 20 October 1886) was an Italian painter and poet of the Romantic period in Northern Italy. He painted mythologic and historic canvases, but is best known for his interpretations of literary subjects including Dante, an enterprise to which he dedicated decades.

He was born in Sissa. He trained at the Academy of Fine Arts of Parma, training under Antonio Pasini and Giovanni Tebaldi. where he became professor from 1860 to 1877. Among his pupils in Parma was Ignazio Affani.
