= Separation of Saints Peter and Paul =

Painting by Giovanni Lanfranco

The Separation of Saints Peter and Paul
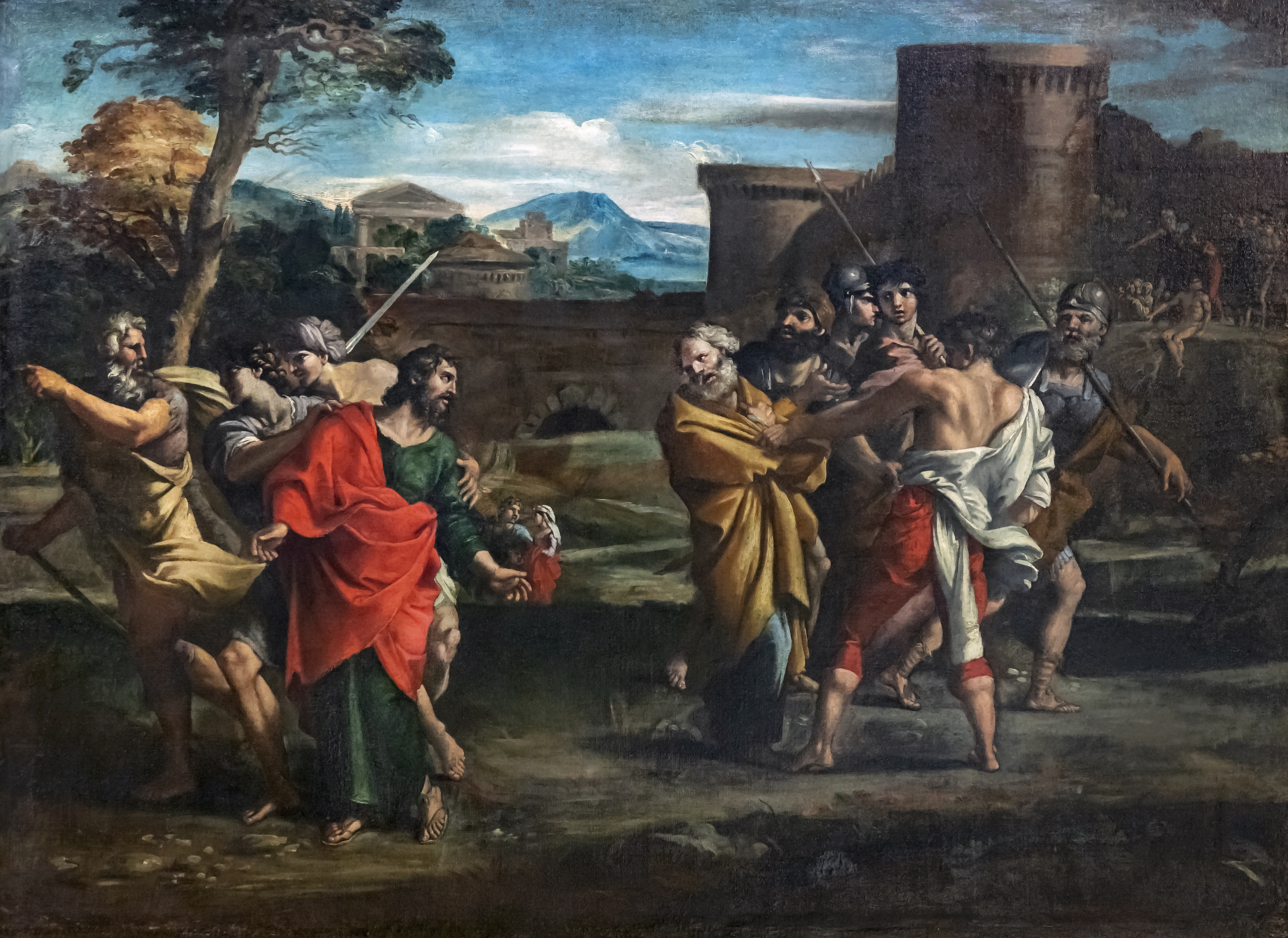
- Artist: Giovanni Lanfranco
- Medium: Oil on canvas
- Dimensions: 106 cm × 144 cm (42 in × 57 in)
- Location: Musée des Beaux-Arts, Carcassonne

The Separation of Saints Peter and Paul is a painting by the Italian Baroque painter Giovanni Lanfranco. It is housed in the Museum of Fine Arts of Carcassonne.

== Description ==
The painting depicts a dispute between Peter and Paul at Antioch in 50 CE, as narrated in the second chapter of Paul's Epistle to the Galatians. The dispute was whether Christian salvation was available only to Jews or also to non-Jews (Gentiles). St Paul is almost certainly the green and red-robed younger bearded man on the left, with a sword rising behind him, forging forward with his entourage to proselytize the outside world. On the right of the canvas, the elder white-haired man, in a yellow robe is led back into the city to administer the church.

The painting was present in Cardinal Mazarin's collection by 1653, was acquired by King Louis XIV in 1671 and moved to Versailles. It was transferred from Versailles to the Louvre in 1899, and then back to Versailles in 1949, and since 2012 it has been moved to the Musée des Beaux-Arts in Carcassonne.
