= Beduschi =

Beduschi is an Italian surname. Notable people with the surname include:

- Andrea Beduschi (born 1992), Italian footballer
- Antonio Beduschi (born 1576– alive 1607), Italian painter of the early-Baroque period
- Carina Beduschi (born 1984), Brazilian model and beauty pageant winner
- Cavour Beduschi (1860–1936), Italian engineer and politician
- Giuseppe Beduschi (1874–1924), Italian missionary
- Paolo Beduschi (1894–1992), Italian World War I fighter pilot
