= Ognissanti, Parma =

Church building in Parma, Italy

Coordinates: 44.797778°N 10.319383°E

The church of Ognissanti is found on Bixio street in Parma, Region of Emilia-Romagna, Italy.

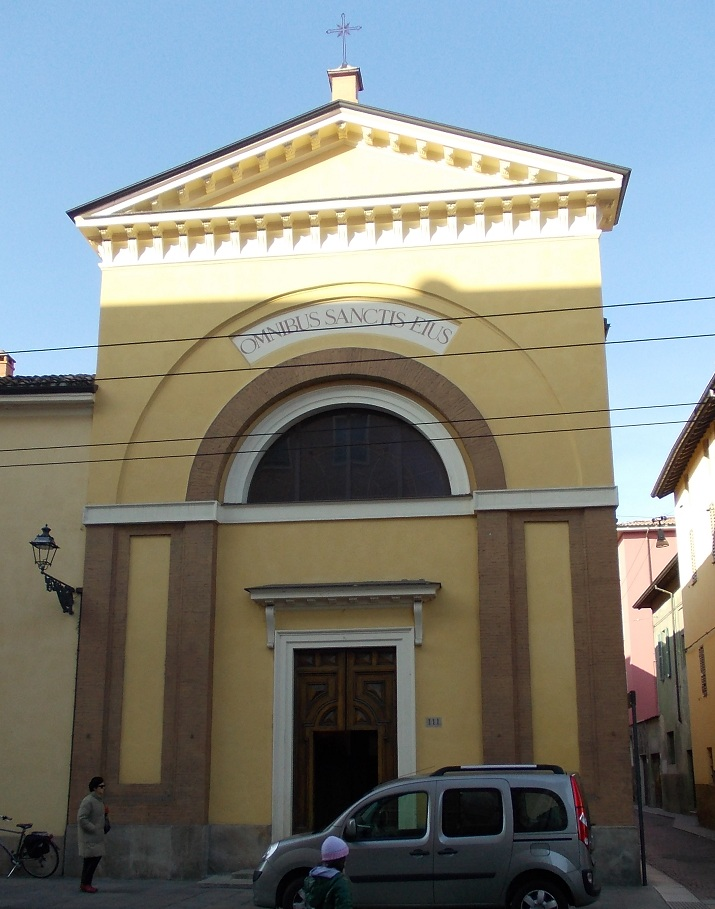
Ognissanti Facade

== History ==
Initial documents date the church to 1230. By the year 1317, the church was linked to the Benedictine monastery adjacent to the church of Sant'Alessandro. Internal reconstructions were performed in 1485 and 1562, the present structure dates from the 19th century, including an 1826 façade by Paolo Gazzola. The main altarpiece, depicting a Paradise under Christ (1610) by Giovanni Lanfranco had been looted by the French and sent to Paris in 1799; it was returned and now is exhibited in the National Art Gallery of Parma.

It still contains the following paintings, including an Immaculate Conception by a young Pietro Melchiorre Ferrari, a Madonna with Saints Liberata and Teopista by Antonio Pasini, a St John the Baptist and Joseph’s Dream by Giuseppe Peroni, and a Madonna of the Rosary by Giovanni Gaibazzi. The small canvases of the Via Crucis are attributed to Francesco Scaramuzza.

The Organ, built in 1747 by Bernardo Poncini, it was transferred to the church from the suppressed Augustinian monastery. It was restored in 1928 by Pedrini.
