= Annunciation (Lanfranco, Rome) =

Painting by Giovanni Lanfranco

The Annunciation
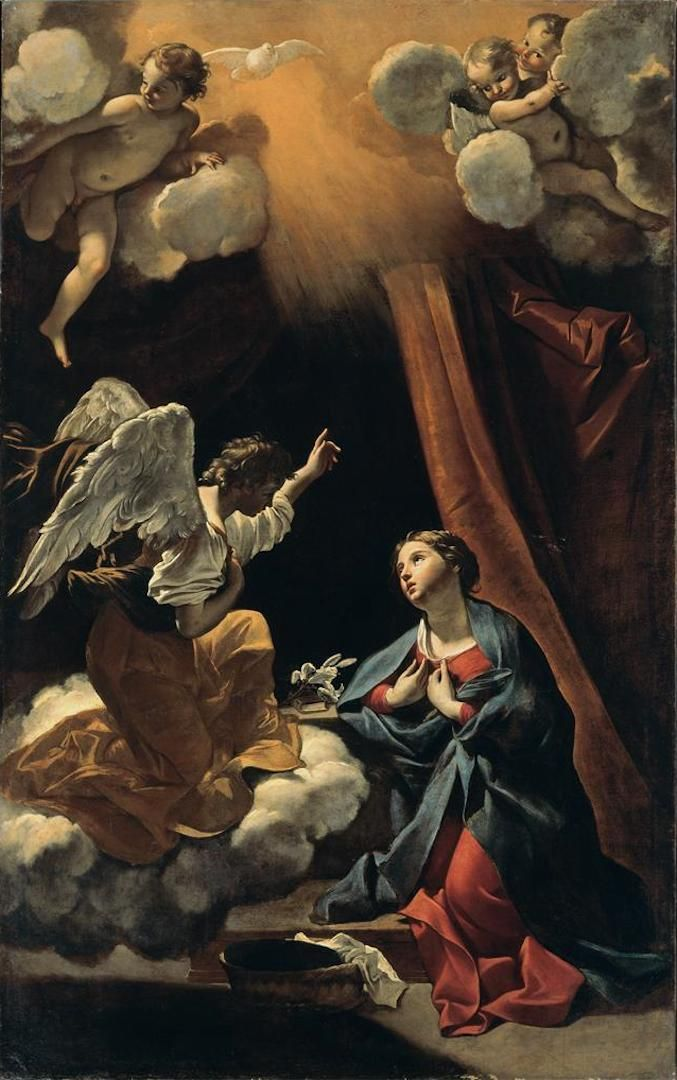
- Artist: Giovanni Lanfranco
- Year: c. 1615–1624
- Medium: Oil on canvas
- Dimensions: 296 cm × 183 cm (117 in × 72 in)
- Location: San Carlo ai Catinari; Rome

The Annunciation is an oil-on-canvas painting by the Italian Baroque painter Giovanni Lanfranco. It is the main altarpiece of the first chapel on the right in the church of San Carlo ai Catinari in Rome, Italy.

== Description ==
The Annunciation painting depicts the archangel Gabriel, aloft on a cloud, revealing to the Virgin Mary that she was pregnant with Jesus (Luke 1:10–20 King James Bible). The archangel, whose face is in shadows, points to the heavens. Above, a group of cherubs open the heavens to allow for light to fall on the Virgin, and to allow the descent (in the form of a dove) of the Holy Spirit. The edge of an orange curtain, lit from above, creates a diagonal rising from the right of the canvas, behind the Virgin, up to the clouds. Mary's face is flooded with light, while her hands take on the demure posture of troubled surprise. On a surface in front of Mary is the common iconographic symbol of the Annunciation, white lilies. On the floor is an empty basket and sheet, foreshadowing the coming child. The painting has striking chiaroscuro contrasts, with a mainly dark background behind Mary and the Archangel.

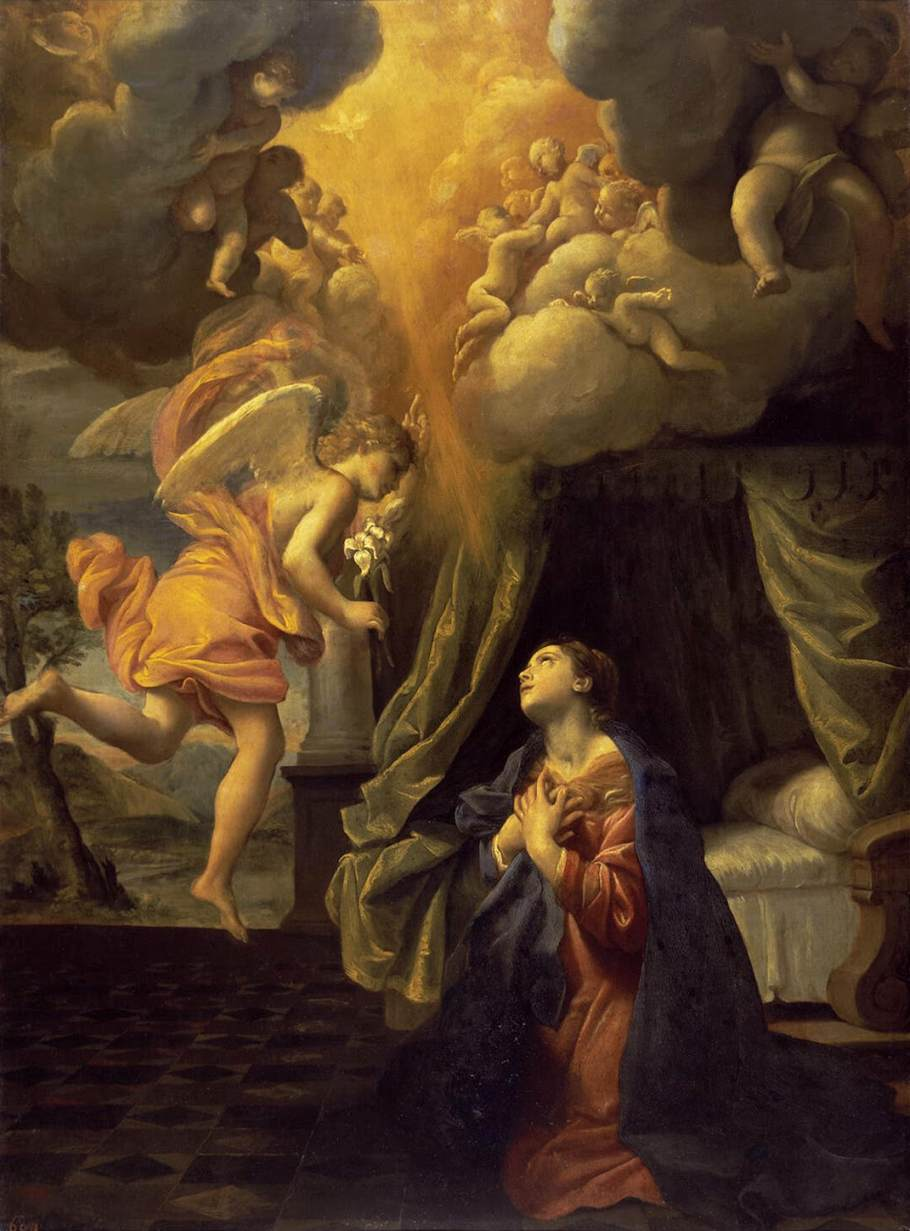
The Annunciation, Hermitage Museum

The date of the painting is variously reported as 1616 or 1624. There is a second, smaller version of The Annunciation by Lanfranco, now displayed at the Hermitage Museum in Saint Petersburg, Russia. While many of the iconographic elements are similar, this painting has far less tenebrism: a bed and landscape can be visualized in the background. This painting was previously in the collection of Francois Tronchin in Geneva. Finally another Annunciation canvas (1636) attributed to Lanfranco is displayed in the church of the Agustinas Recoletas in Salamanca.

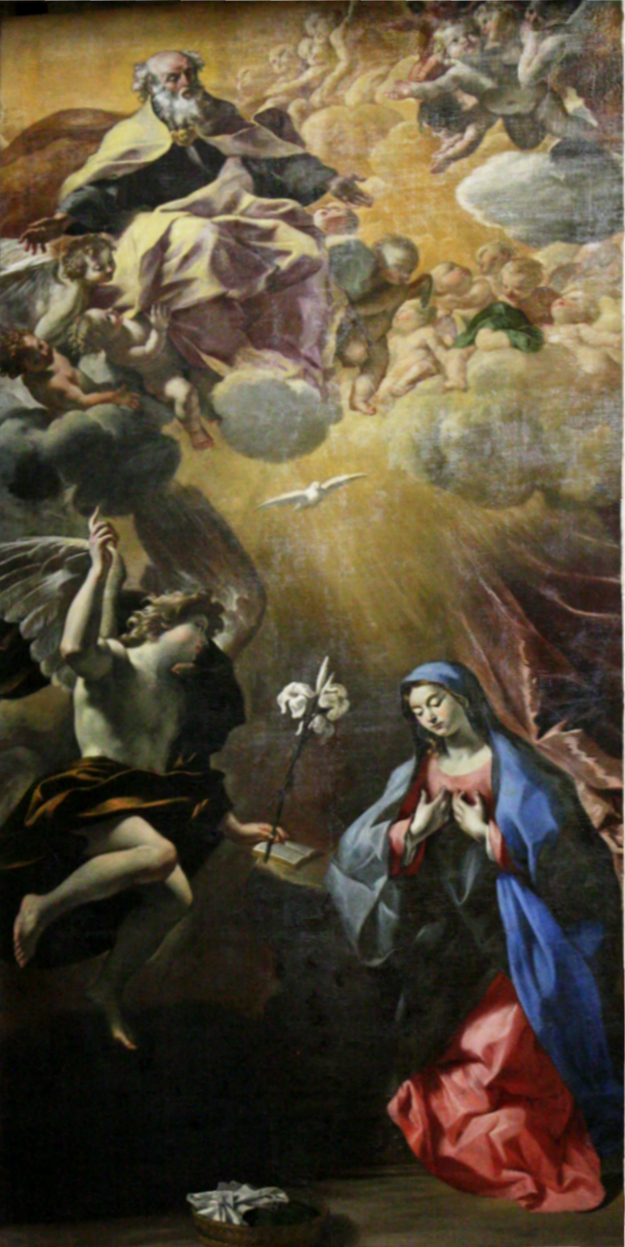
The Annunciation, Church of the Agustinas Recoletas

A pen and brown ink drawing, inscribed with G Lanfranco, follows a similar layout. A print by the engraver Cornelis Bloemaert is based on the painting at the Hermitage.
