= Santi Nazzaro e Celso, Piacenza =

Church building in Piacenza, Italy

Coordinates: 45°03′15″N 9°41′05″E

Santi Nazzaro e Celso, or Nazaro e Celso, is a deconsecrated Roman Catholic church located at the corner of Cantone San Nazzaro and via Taverna Giuseppe in Piacenza, region of Emilia Romagna, Italy. Since the 1980s, the space is occupied by the Galleria Rosso Tiziano, which sponsors exhibitions and cultural events.

A parish church was founded at the site in 1025. It formerly held two canavases depicting the patron saints, painted by Giovanni Rubini. It also once held some canvases by Gaspare Landi.

Starting in the 17th century, the original Romanesque church was rebuilt by Giacomo Agostini and refurbished, inverting the apse and the facade, and creating a baroque interior. The structure has a typical nave with two side aisles. The facade is flanked by a bell-tower. In the first half of the 18th-century, the interior stucco decoration of the choir was completed by Francesco Cremona, while Giovanni Pietro Zanoni and Antonio Inselmini completed the decoration in the nave. Much of the artwork has been relocated. In 1902, the church was closed and the parish moved to the nearby church of San Sepolcro. For years, the interior was used as a warehouse and carpentry shop. In 1986–1988, the interior was repaired and put to use as the Galleria d'arte Spazio Rosso Tiziano.

The cardinal Giulio Alberoni, who became a minister of King Phillip V of Spain, was initially trained at this church.
