= Elijah Receiving Bread from the Widow of Zarephath =

Painting by Giovanni Lanfranco

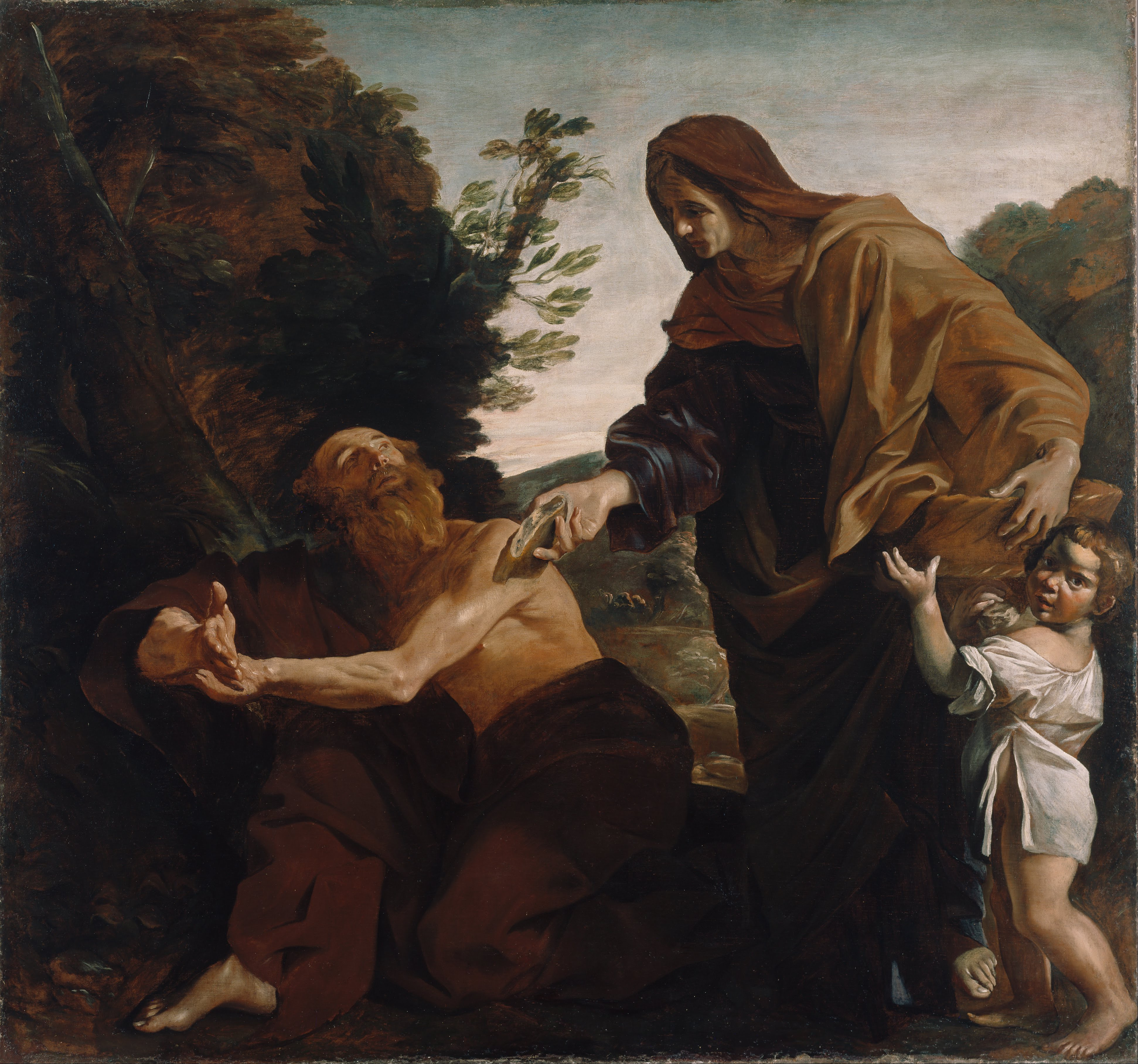
- Artist: Giovanni Lanfranco
- Year: 1621-1625
- Medium: Oil on canvas
- Dimensions: 203 cm × 243 cm (80 in × 96 in)
- Location: J. Paul Getty Museum; Los Angeles

Elijah Receiving Bread from the Widow of Zarephath is a painting by the Italian Baroque painter Giovanni Lanfranco. It is housed in the J. Paul Getty Museum located in Los Angeles, California.

== Description ==
The painting was part of a series developed for the Chapel of the Holy Sacrament in the church of San Paolo fuori le Mura in Rome. It depicts an Old Testament event described as the Raising of the son of the widow of Zarephath. The widow and her resurrected child bring bread to the hungry Elijah who is seeking shelter near a dry stream. The events are narrated in the Old Testament, 1 Kings 17. The bread evokes the sacramental bread of the Eucharist. In the chapel, this painting accompanied canvas depictions of the Last Supper and Moses and the Messengers from Canaan (also displayed at the Getty Museum). The grapes in the latter painting evoke the sacramental wine of the Eucharist. The painting was likely displayed high on the walls of the chapel, and the point of view appears to begin below the canvas. It was removed from the church in 1856, and resold to a few owners until reaching the Getty Museum in 1976.
