= Giovanni Lanfranco =

Italian painter (1582–1647)

Cavalier Giovanni Lanfranco
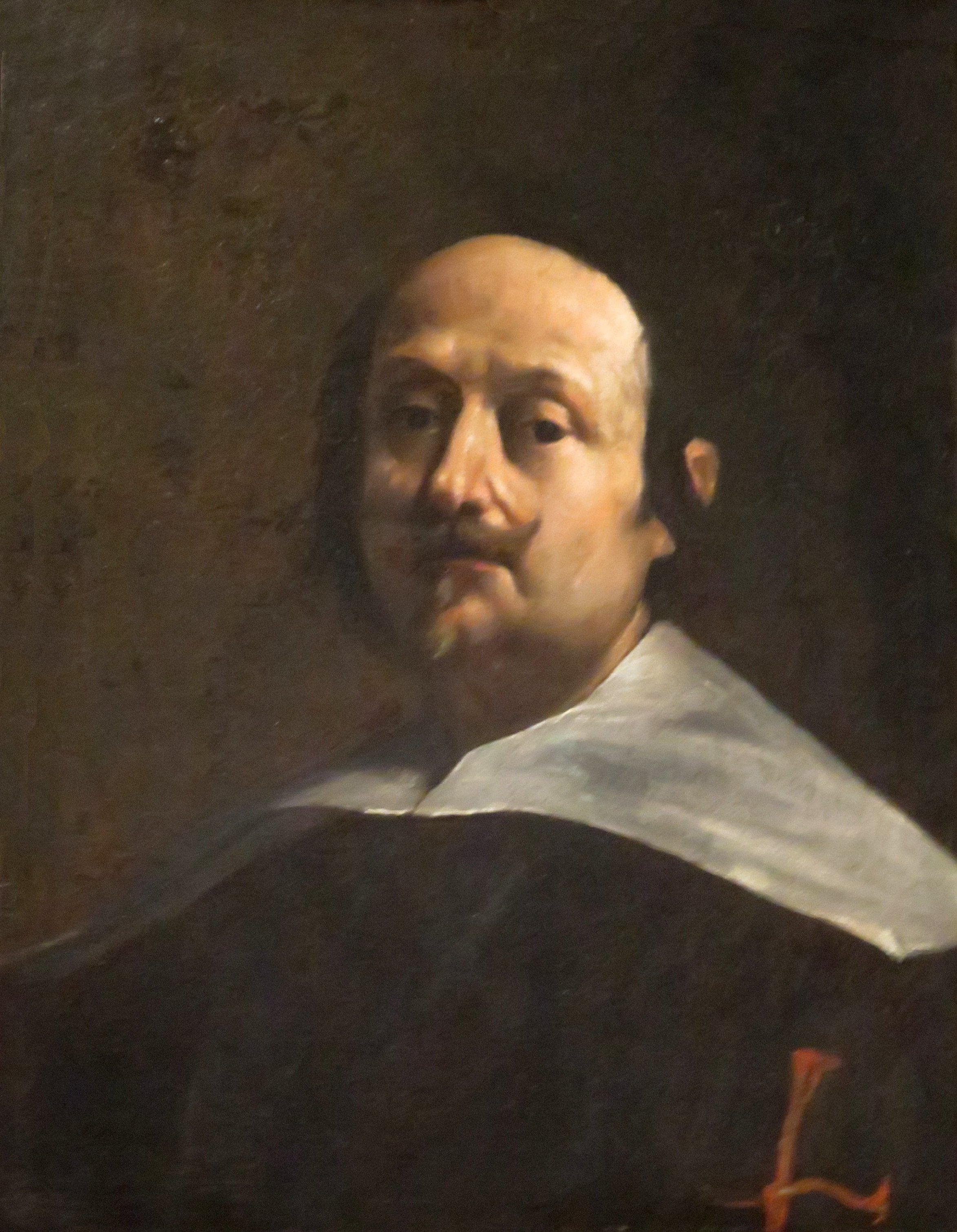
- Self-portrait, 1628–1632, Columbus Museum of Art, Columbus, Ohio
- Born: 26 January 1582; Parma, Duchy of Parma and Piacenza
- Died: 30 November 1647 (aged 65); Rome, Papal States
- Education: Agostino Carracci; Annibale Carracci
- Known for: Painting
- Notable work: The Annunciation (c. 1615–1624); Elijah Receiving Bread from the Widow of Zarephath (1621-1625); Moses and the Messengers from Canaan (1621-1625); Ecstasy of St Margaret of Cortona (1622); Venus plays the Harp c. 1634
- Movement: Baroque
- Spouse: Cassandra Barli (m. 1616)

Signature
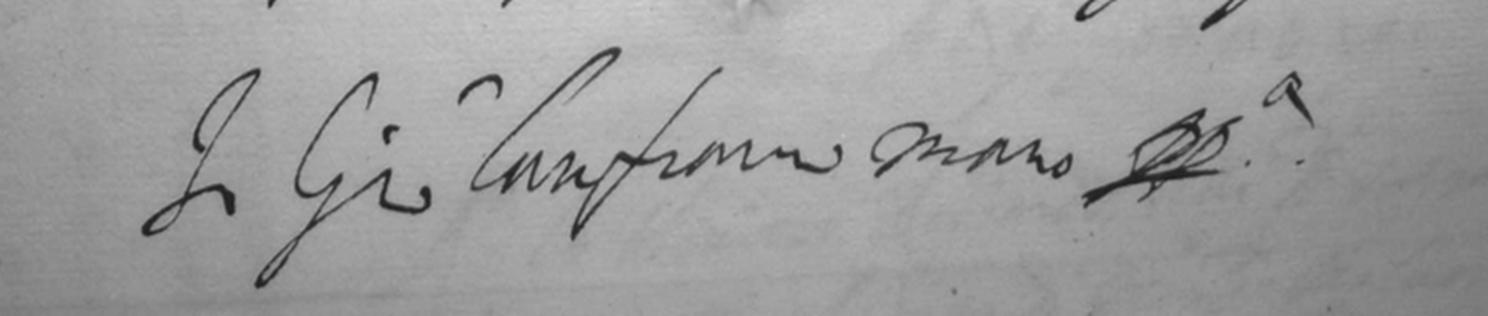

Giovanni Lanfranco (26 January 1582 – 30 November 1647) was an Italian Baroque painter. He was a distinguished artist of the Bolognese school, deeply influenced by Annibale Carracci's’ classicism.

== Biography ==
Giovanni Gaspare Lanfranco was born in Parma, the third son of Stefano and Cornelia Lanfranchi, and was placed as a page in the household of Count Orazio Scotti. His talent for drawing allowed him to begin an apprenticeship with the Bolognese artist Agostino Carracci, brother of Annibale Carracci, working alongside fellow Parmese Sisto Badalocchio in the local Farnese palaces. Lanfranco's first work, a Madonna and Saints in the church of Sant'Agostino, Piacenza, executed during his apprenticeship under Agostino, is lost.

When Agostino died in 1602, both young artists moved to Annibale's large and prominent Roman workshop, which was then involved in working on the Galleria Farnese in the Palazzo Farnese gallery ceiling. Lanfranco is considered to have contributed to the panel of Polyphemus and Galatea (replica in Doria Gallery) and some minor works in the room.

Afterwards, while still technically a member of the Carracci studio of Carracci, Lanfranco, along with Guido Reni and Francesco Albani, frescoed the Herrera (San Diego) Chapel in San Giacomo degli Spagnoli (1602–1607). He also participated in the fresco decoration of San Gregorio Magno and of the Cappella Paolina in Santa Maria Maggiore.

== Independent work ==
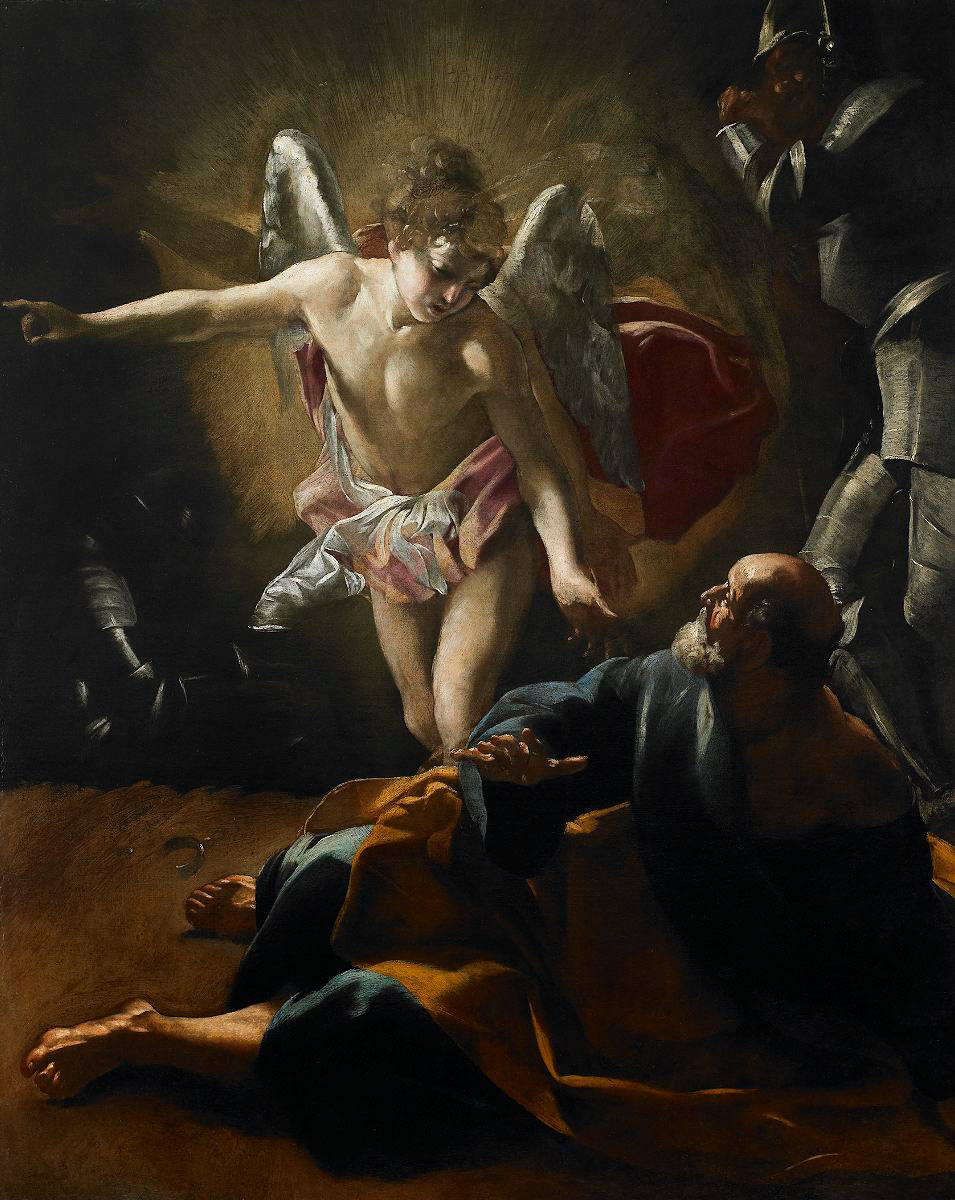
Liberation of Saint Peter, c. 1620-1621, Birmingham Museum of Art, Birmingham, Alabama

By 1605, Lanfranco was obtaining some independent commissions; for example, he contributed paintings to the Camerino degli Eremiti in the Palazzetto Farnese (also known as Casino della Morte), once a low building on the Via Giulia, adjacent to the church of Santa Maria dell’Orazione e Morte. The camerino had been constructed by Cardinal Odoardo Farnese, next to his palace and gardens, and was destroyed in 1734 to allow for the construction of the aforementioned church. Of the canvases and frescoes by Domenichino, Scipione Pulzone, Paul Bril, and Lanfranco, some are conserved in the new church. Among other works, Lanfranco contributed to this series, were the Translation of the Magdalen.

After the death of Annibale Carracci in 1609, and with the Emilian school of painting temporarily out of favor, Lanfranco returned to his native Duchy of Parma and Piacenza for two years.There, he met Bartolomeo Schedoni and painted the altarpiece for the Ognissanti church. The large number of ecclesiastical commissions that he received in Piacenza suggest a stay of about two years. In that town he stayed with the benefactor of his youth, Count Orazio Scotti, for whom he painted several cabinet pictures.

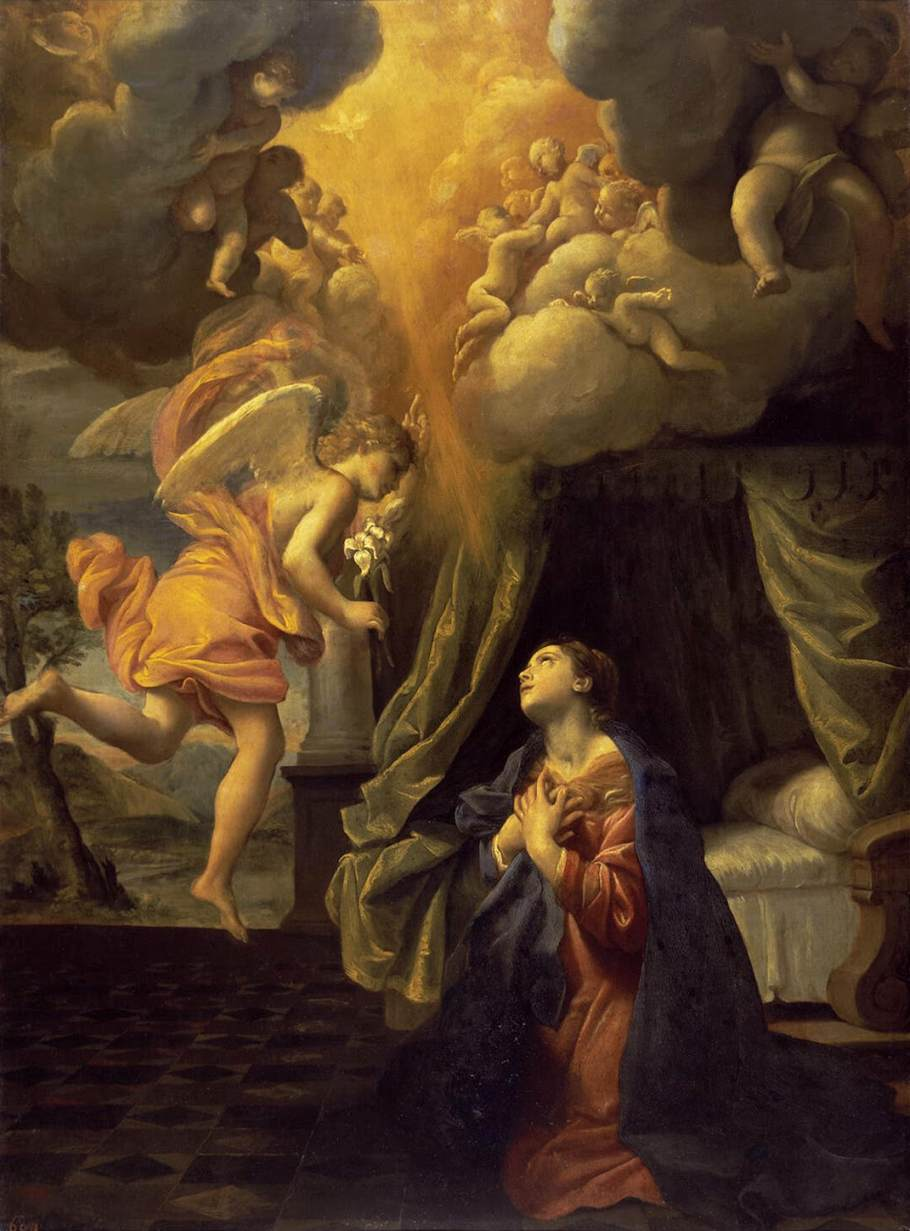
Annunciation, between 1610 and 1630 (Hermitage Museum)

It is not clear why Lanfranco suddenly received so many demands for paintings for churches; his reputation may have been enhanced by his having worked with Annibale in Rome. His first altarpiece, the Archangel Raphael and Satan (1610; Naples, Museo di Capodimonte), for Santi Nazzaro e Celso, remains close to Annibale Carracci, while the altarpiece with St. Luke (1611; Piacenza, Coll. Notarile), painted for the Cappella di San Luca in Santa Maria delle Grazie at Piacenza, is the work in which Lanfranco was most strongly influenced by Ludovico Carracci. The fresco in this chapel’s small cupola (destr. 1810) was Lanfranco’s first work of this kind. The altarpiece of the Madonna of Reggio, Venerated by St. Francis and St. Rusticus (Naples, Museo di Capodimonte), for Sant'Andrea, may also have been painted in 1611; the influence of Annibale remains, but the movements of the figures and the folds of the drapery are more pronounced and more strongly articulated. A fourth altarpiece, the Salvation of a Soul (c. 1612; Naples, Museo di Capodimonte) for San Lorenzo in Piacenza, is stylistically the most Emilian of the altarpieces; in its use of colour, in the light-filled, diaphanous garments, in the clouds and in the flesh tones, it is strongly influenced by Schedoni and indirectly by Correggio. Here Lanfranco is furthest from the Roman style of Annibale. Lanfranco also produced paintings and altarpieces in Orvieto, Vallerano, Leonessa and Fermo.

== Return to Rome ==
After his return to Rome by 1612, Lanfranco competed with other Carracci students and assistants – including Reni, Albani, and Domenichino – for Roman patronage. Reni, however, was soon to depart for Naples and then Bologna. During the following decades in Rome, through the 1620s, Lanfranco and Domenichino engaged in a rivalry for the main fresco commissions. A measure of the competition can be gauged from Lanfranco's public accusation, not wholly without merit, that Domenichino had plagiarized Agostino Carracci in his painting of the Confession of St. Jerome, now in the Vatican.

Unlike Domenichino, Lanfranco was fairly eclectic in terms of style but preferred a visionary, theatrical approach suitable for the ceiling paintings gaining currency in the early 17th century. His works suggest some influence from the late work of Ludovico Carracci, a cousin of Agostino and Annibale, and possibly from Caravaggio – as, for example, in the altarpiece depicting the Inspiration of Saint Luke at Piacenza (1611) – though the stylistic importance of Caravaggio to Lanfranco has been disputed. In other works, he assimilated and adapted the style of his compatriot and predecessor of the 16th century, Antonio Correggio, as in his Adoration of the Shepherds painted before 1608 for the Marchese Clemente Sannesi and his brother the Cardinal Jacopo.

Lanfranco's studio became quite active, painting frescoes in the Palazzo Mattei and decorating the Buongiovanni Chapel in Sant'Agostino (1616), which includes a Correggesque Assumption, along with easel paintings. His Annunciation (1615) in San Carlo ai Catinari in regarded as one of his best works. Soon, Lanfranco became the pre-eminent painter of the circle of Pope Paul V. He painted frescoes for the Palazzo Costaguti and a large ceiling fresco in quadratura at the Villa Borghese, The Gods of Olympus or also called Council of the Gods.

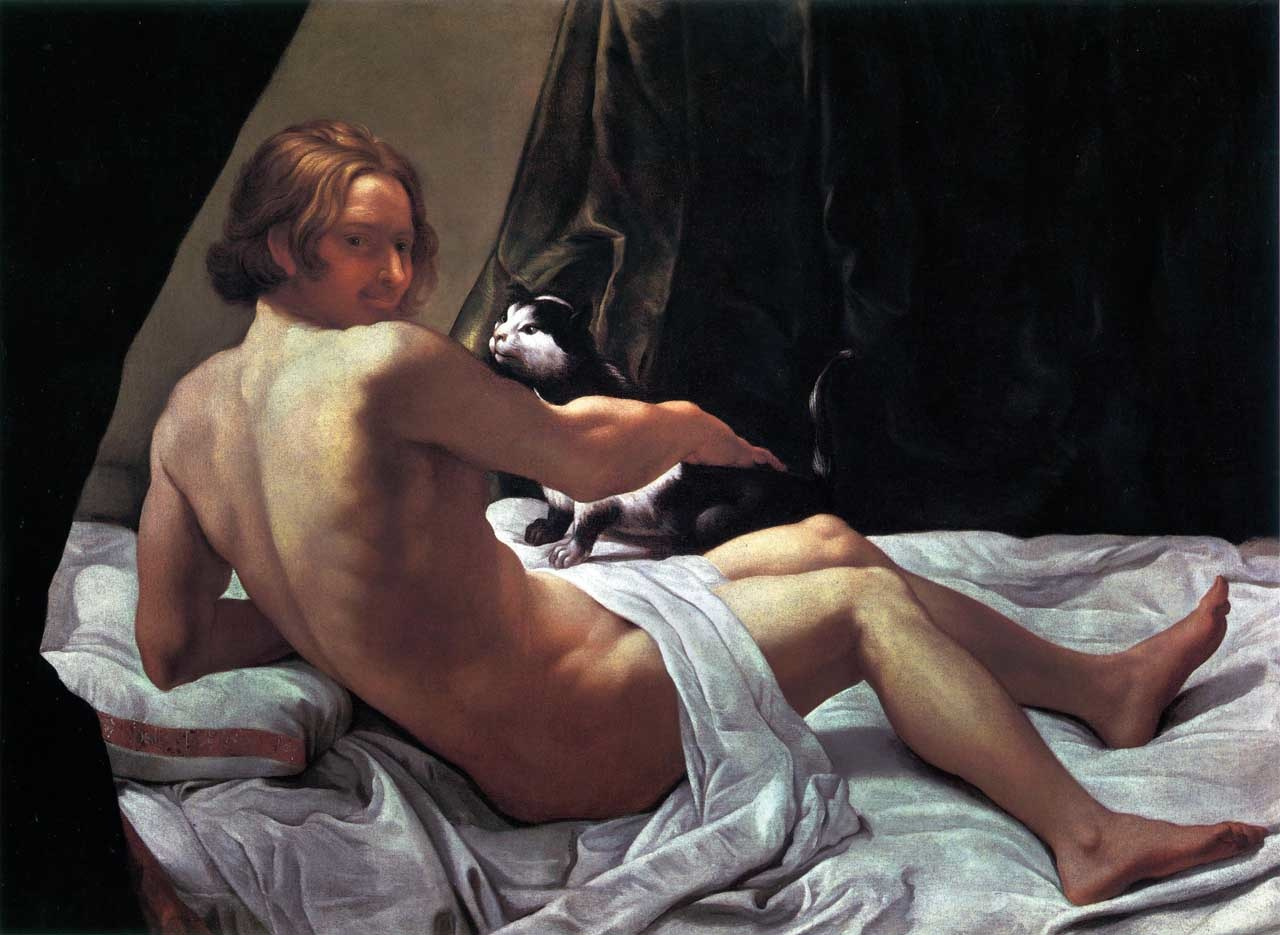
Giovane nudo sul letto con un gatto (Nude young man with a cat), between 1620 and 1622, private collection

In the following year, Lanfranco together with Agostino Tassi and Carlo Saraceni decorated the Sala de' Corazzieri and Sala Regia of the Palazzo del Quirinale. His formal Presentation at the Temple has the sunlit Carraci-like style. In 1622, he painted the Ectasy of Saint Margaret of Cortona (Galleria Platina, Palazzo Pitti, Florence) as an altarpiece for Santa Maria Nuova in Cortona, where Margaret lived and died. The painting could well have inspired the pose in Bernini's famous St Theresa in ecstasy. In 1623–1624, he decorated the Sacchetti Chapel in San Giovanni dei Fiorentini in Rome. While Paul V's successor, Gregory XV, preferred works by Guercino and Domenichino, Lanfranco won commissions for the Crucifix Chapel in Santa Maria in Vallicella. Lanfranco's crowning masterpiece, however, and one of the major church fresco decoration of the late 1620s, was his Assumption of the Virgin frescoed on the dome of Sant'Andrea della Valle. Completed in 1627 in sotto in su perspective, the crowded array of figures is a landmark in Baroque painting with bright golden coloration and energy. Lanfranco was influenced by Correggio's pioneering decoration of the Duomo di Parma.

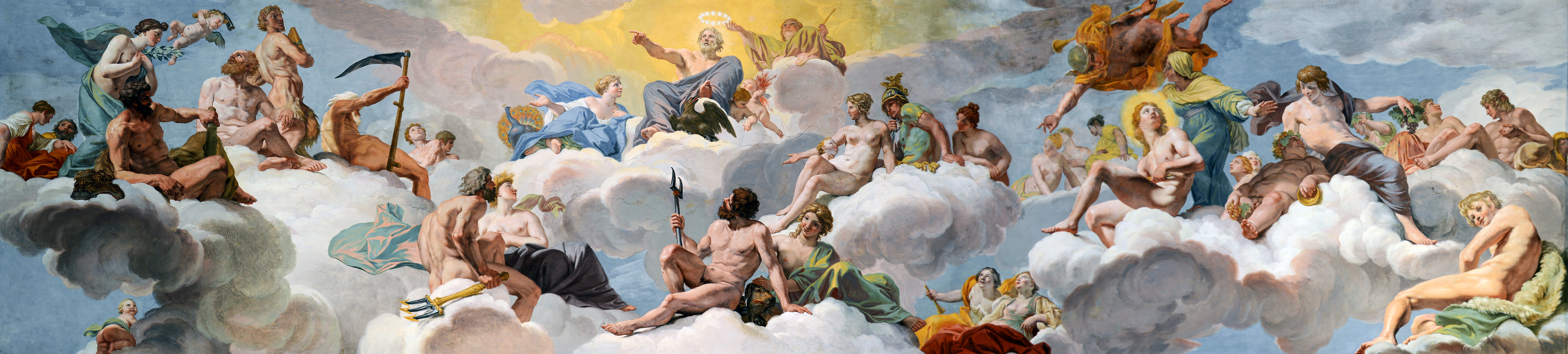
Council of the Gods, ceiling in Palazzo Barberini

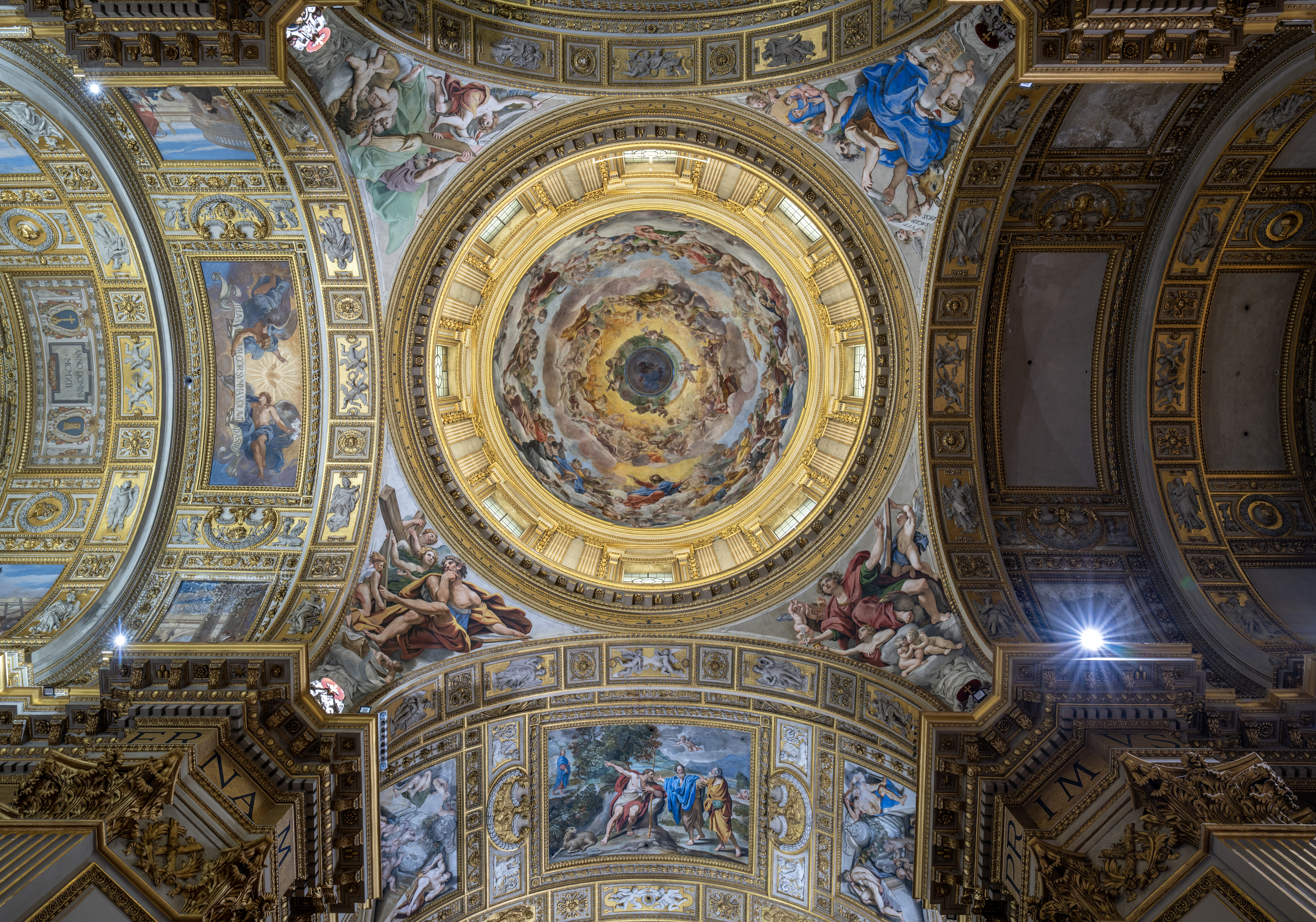
Frescoed Cupula of Sant'Andrea della Valle

Urban VIII commissioned him a large fresco portraying St. Peter Walking on Waters (1628, now fragmentary), for which Lanfranco gained the title of Knight of the Supreme Order of Christ. In 1631, Lanfranco was named Prince (Principe) of the Academy of Saint Luke, the artist's guild in Rome. There is also a fresco by Giovanni Lanfranco above the monument of Pope Clement VIII in Santa Maria Maggiore in (Rome).

From 1634 to 1646, Lanfranco began decorating the dome and pendentives of the Jesuit church of the Gesù Nuovo in Naples in 1634–1637. In 1637–1638, he frescoed the nave and choir of the Certosa of San Martino. This was followed by the decoration of Santi Apostoli in 1638–1646 and the dome of the Cappella of San Gennaro in the Cathedral of Naples. These works would invigorate the efforts of the grand manner Napolitan painters of the second half of the 17th century: Preti, Giordano and Solimena. He died in Rome in 1647, where his last work was apse of San Carlo ai Catinari. Lanfranco was buried in Santa Maria in Trastevere.

== Legacy and critical assessment ==
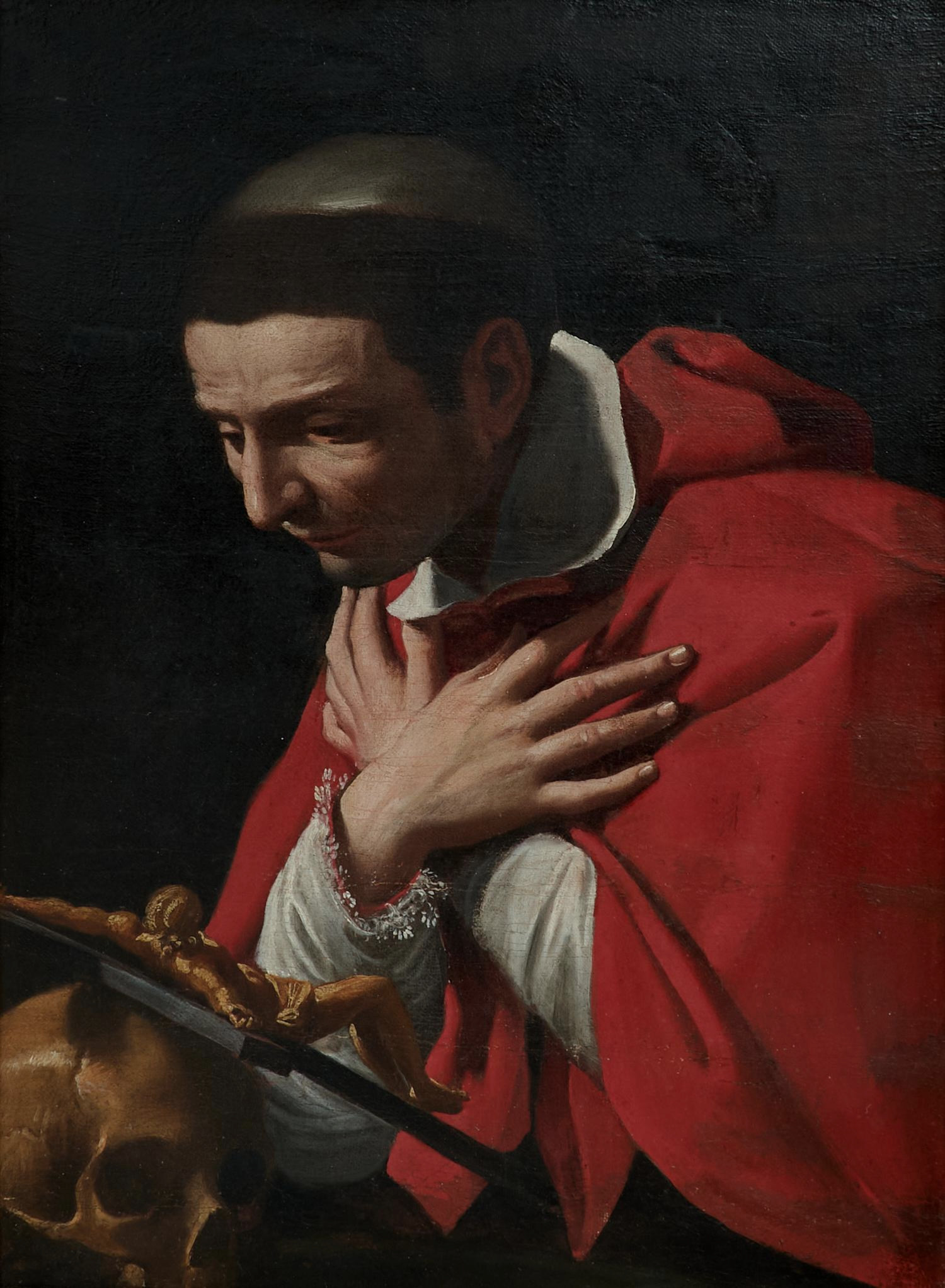
St. Charles Borromeo in contemplation, c. 1614–15, oil on canvas, 69 x 51 cm

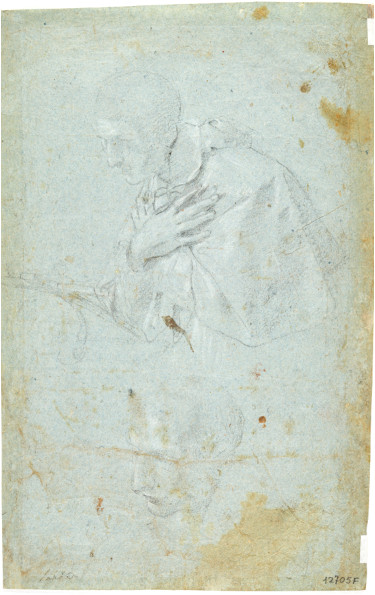
Chalk sketch of Charles Borromeo, Uffizi collection (inventory no. 12705 F)

Lanfranco was a versatile and eclectic trainee of the Carracci, and continued their tradition with dramatic flair compared to the often restrained Domenichino, who mimicked mainly Annibale's grand manner. He explored new styles, bridged traditions, painted in both mannerist and baroque styles. Until around 1620 Lanfranco occasionally adopted a tenebroso style inspired by the Caravaggesque movement when working on panel and canvas. This contrasting form of chiaroscuro is strikingly evident in one of the few surviving half portraits he composed, which depicts St. Charles Borromeo (1538–1584) in contemplation. The existence of this long-lost work had already been postulated by Erich Schleier in 1983 on the basis of a chalk sketch from around 1614 that he identified in the Uffizi collection (inventory no. 12705 F). It is representative of more than 500 surviving drawings by Lanfranco, most of which are housed in the Museo di Capodimonte in Naples (approx. 400 sheets), the Uffizi (60 drawings), and the collections of the Düsseldorf Academy of Fine Arts and Windsor Castle (48 sheets each). Various types of drawings have been identified: a large number of figure studies, mostly in black and white chalk; small-format compositional drawings in various techniques; and sketches in pen and wash, or in red or black chalk. Portrait studies, such as that of Charles Borromeo, are rare, as are landscape drawings in pen. Lanfranco's best known pupils include Giacinto Brandi and François Perrier.

== Selected works ==
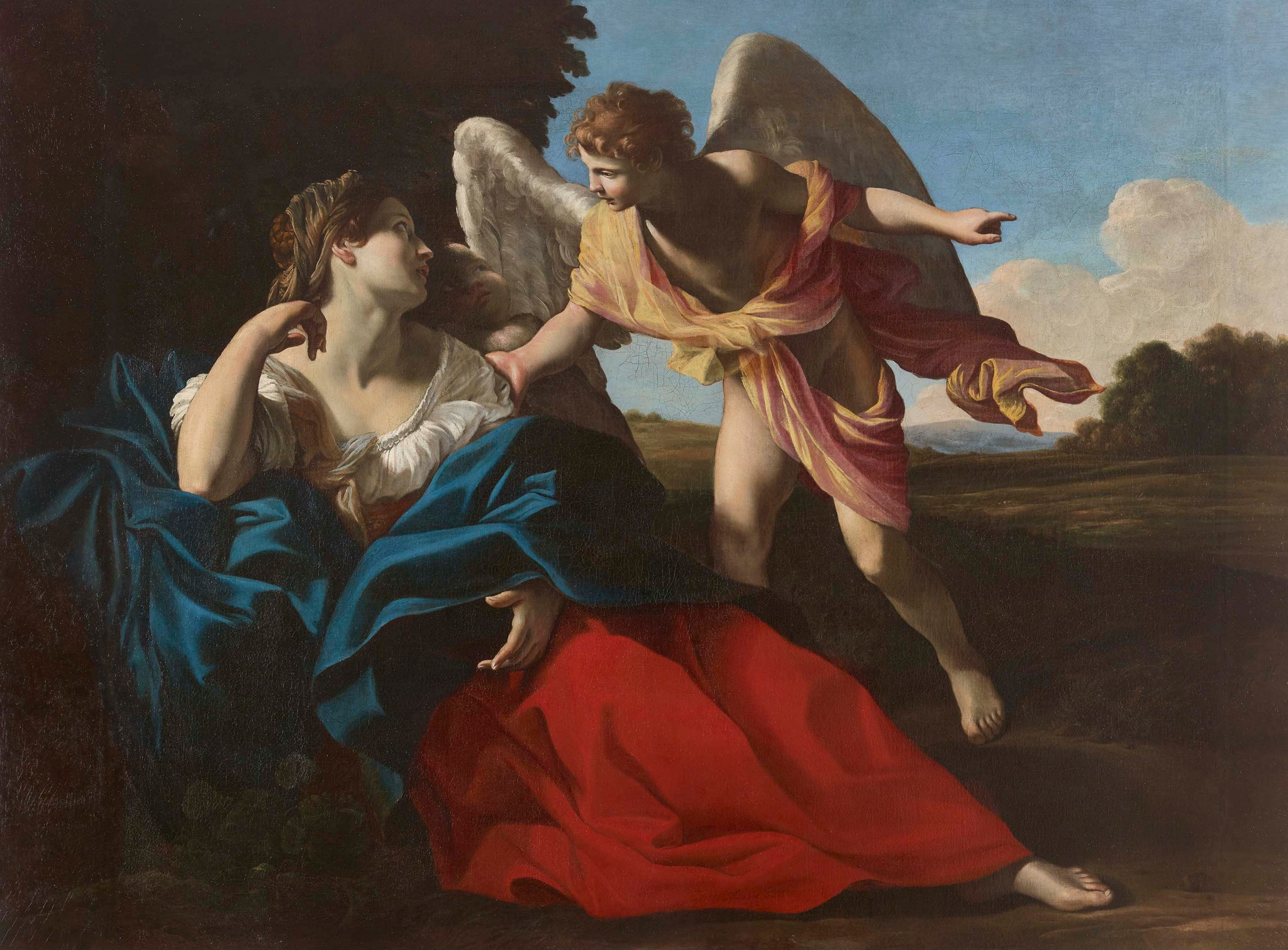
Hagar in the Wilderness, Louvre, Paris

- St. Charles Borromeo in contemplation (c. 1614–15), oil on canvas, 69 x 51 cm, private collection, Germany
- Venus plays the Harp, Galleria Nazionale d'Arte Antica, Rome (Palazzo Barberini);
- Alexander tended by the doctor and Alexander refusing water to drink from his men, Fondazione Manodori, Reggio Emilia;
- The Annunciation (c. 1615–24) San Carlo ai Catinari, Rome;
- Coronation of the Virgin with St. Augustine and St. William of Aquitaine;
- Hagar in the Wilderness, Louvre, Paris;
- Liberation of Saint Peter (c. 1620–21), Birmingham Museum of Art, Birmingham, Alabama;
- Ecstasy of St Margaret of Cortona, 1622, Palazzo Pitti, Florence;
- Moses and the Messengers from Canaan, 1620–25, Getty Center, Los Angeles;
- Elijah Receiving Bread from the Widow of Zarephath, 1620–25, Getty Center, Los Angeles;
- The Last Supper, 1624–1625, National Gallery of Ireland, Dublin;
- Madonna and Child with the Infant Saint John the Baptist, c. 1630–1632, Getty Center, Los Angeles;
- Gladiators at a Banquet, c. 1638, Museo del Prado, Madrid;
- Quirinal Palace frescoes.
- The Separation of Saints Peter and Paul, Museum of Fine Arts of Carcassonne.
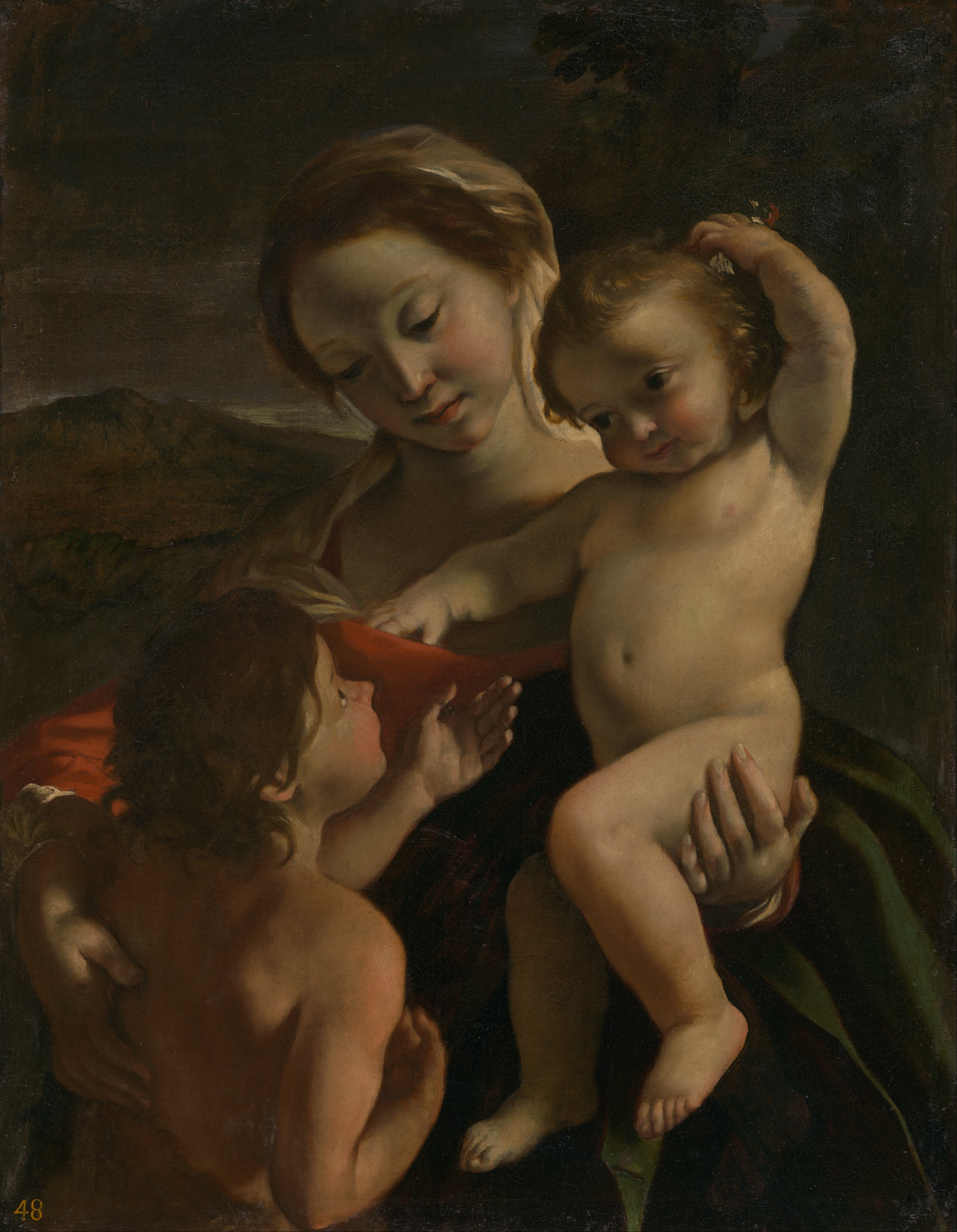
Madonna and Child with the Infant Saint John the Baptist, c. 1630–1632, Getty Center, Los Angeles

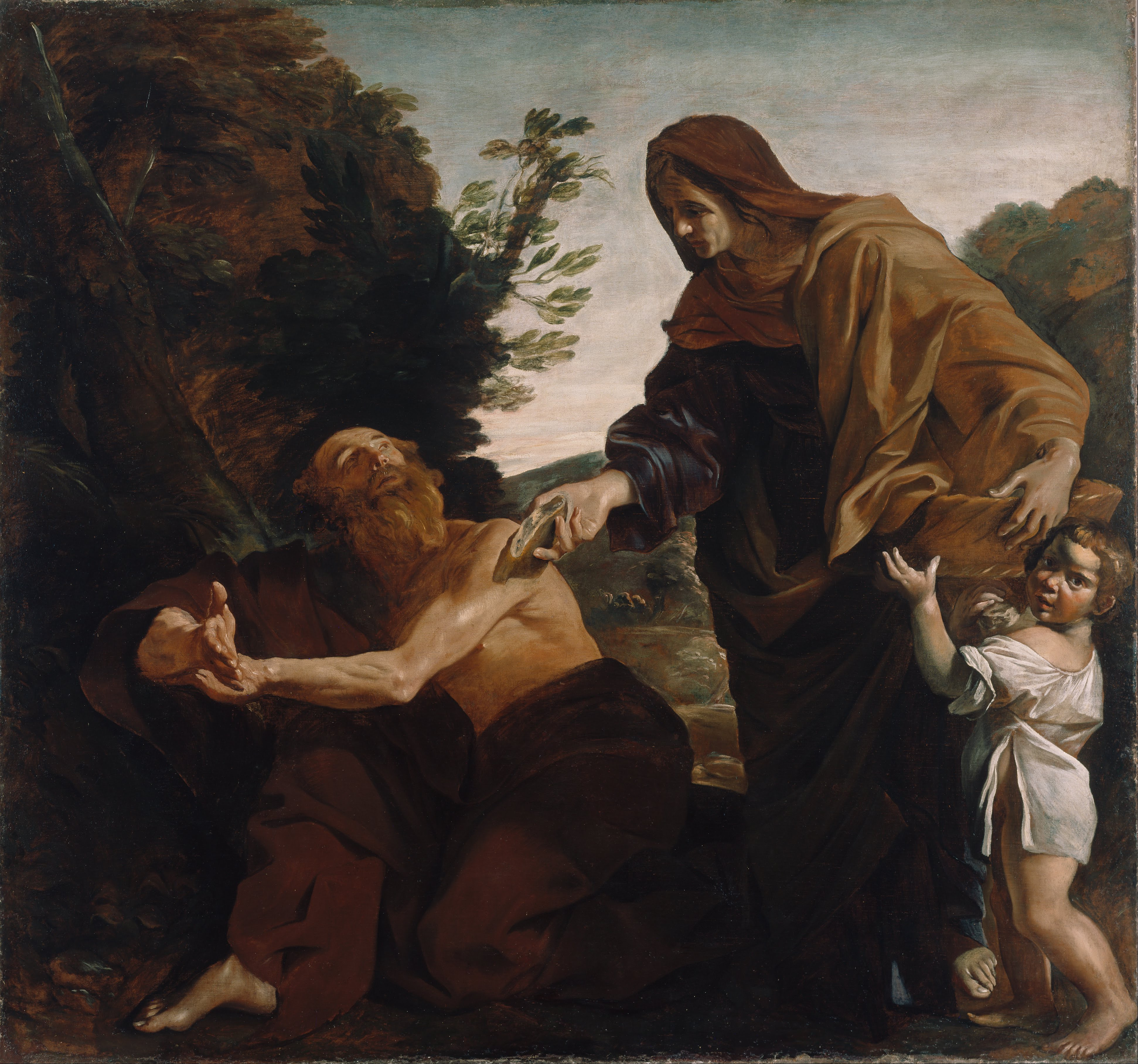
Elijah Receiving Bread from the Widow of Zarephath, 1621–1624, Getty Center, Los Angeles

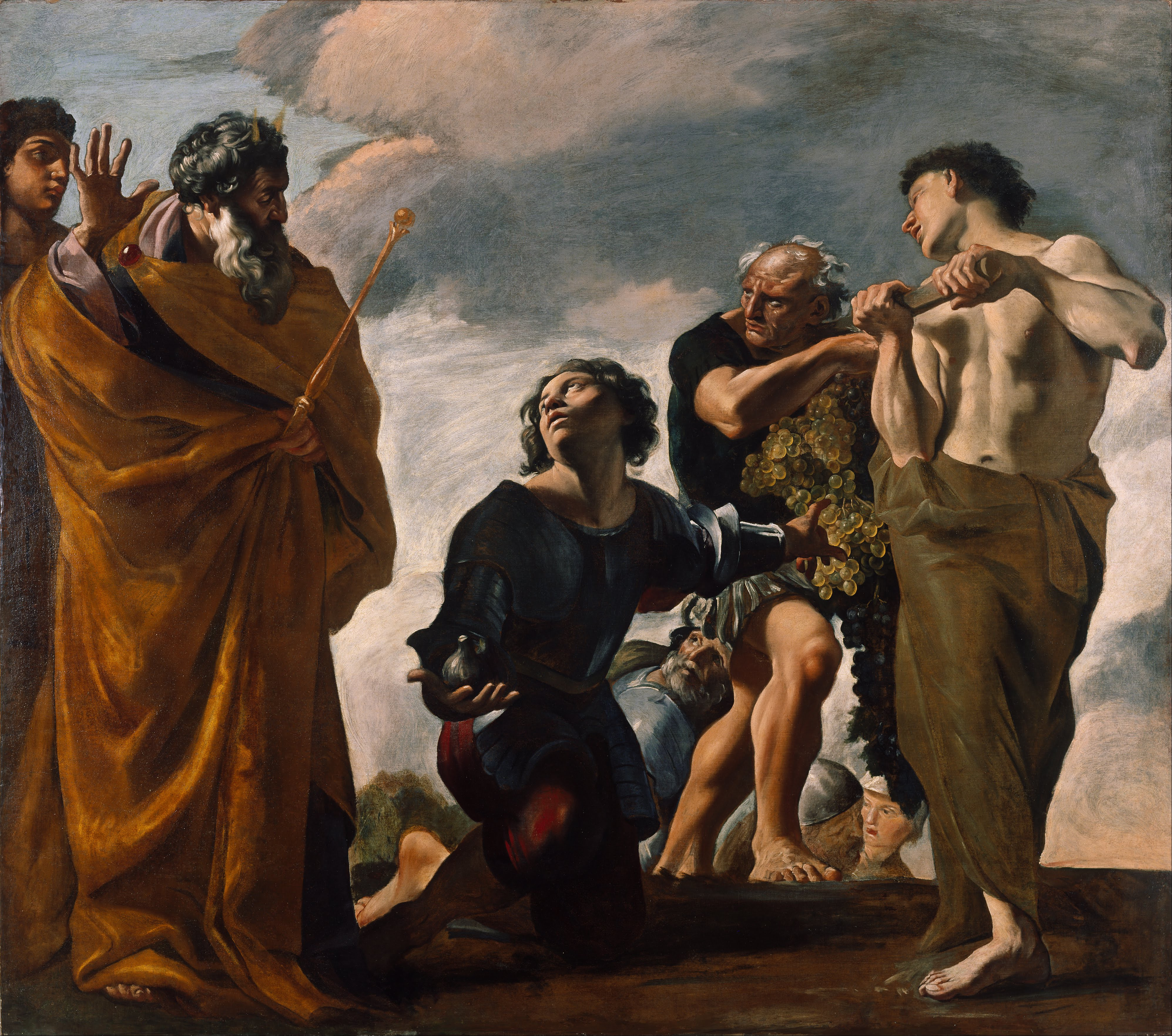
Moses and the Messengers from Canaan, 1621–1624, Getty Center, Los Angeles

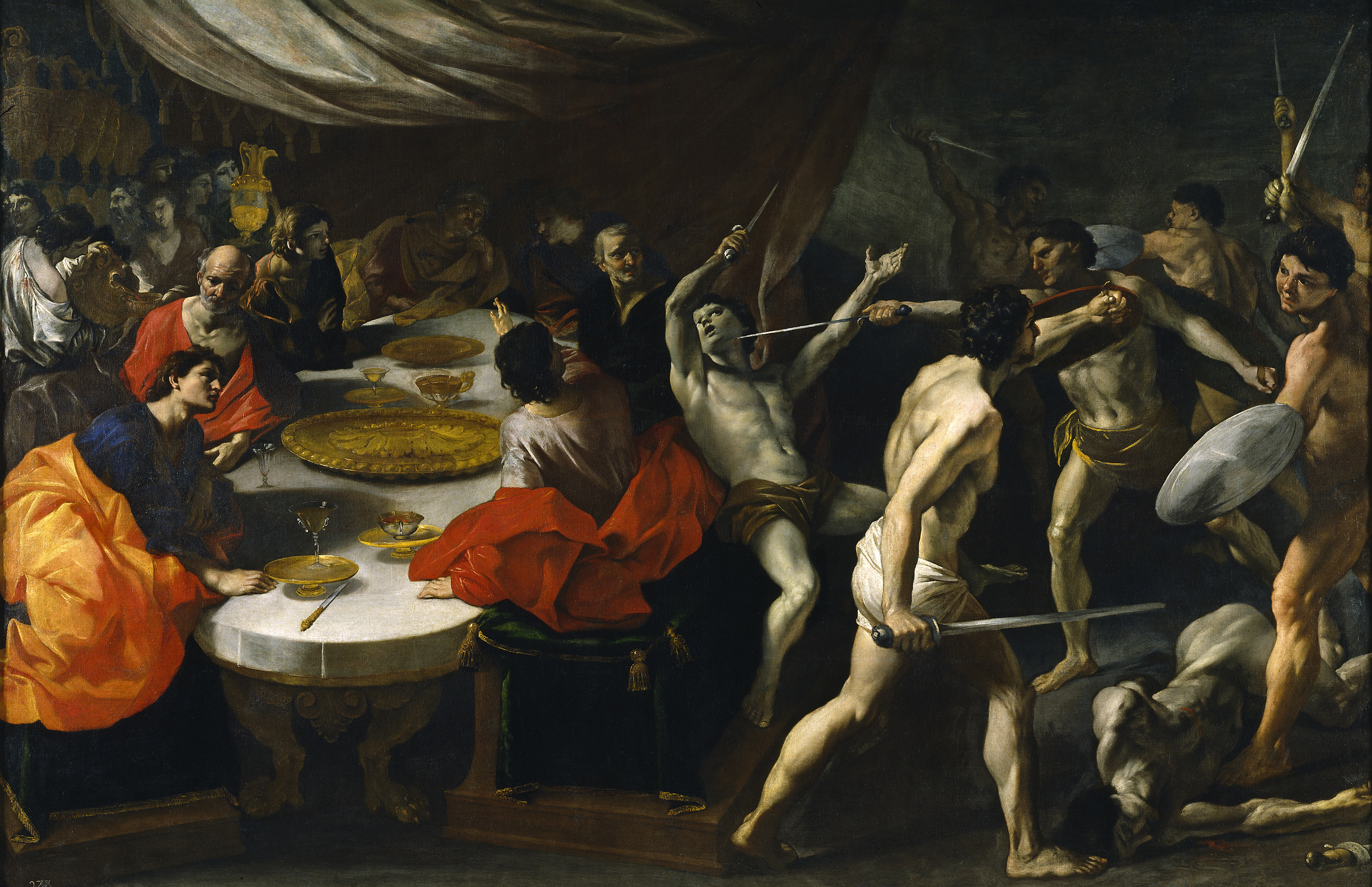
Gladiators at a Banquet, c. 1638, Museo del Prado, Madrid

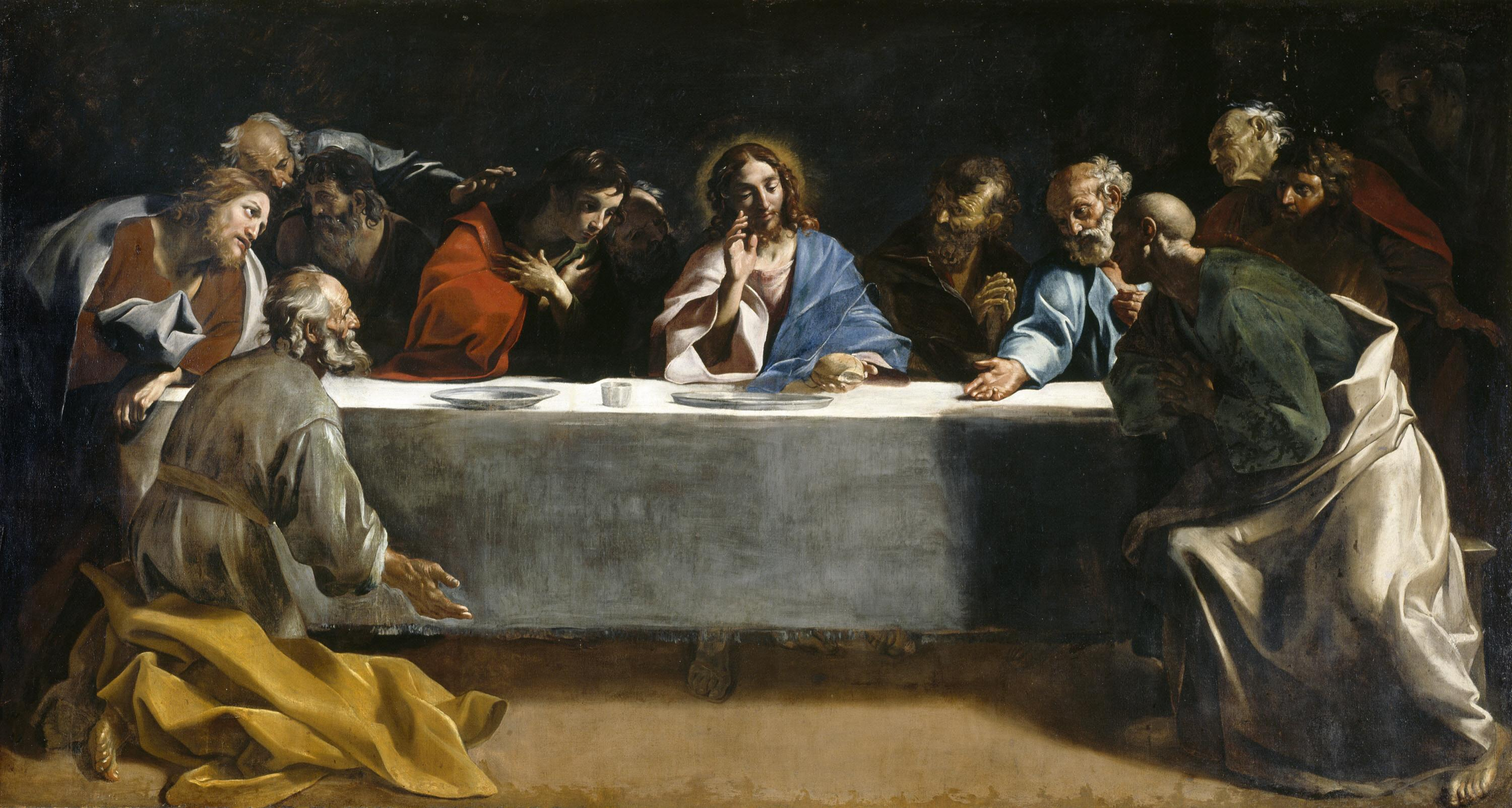
The Last Supper, 1624–1625, National Gallery of Ireland, Dublin

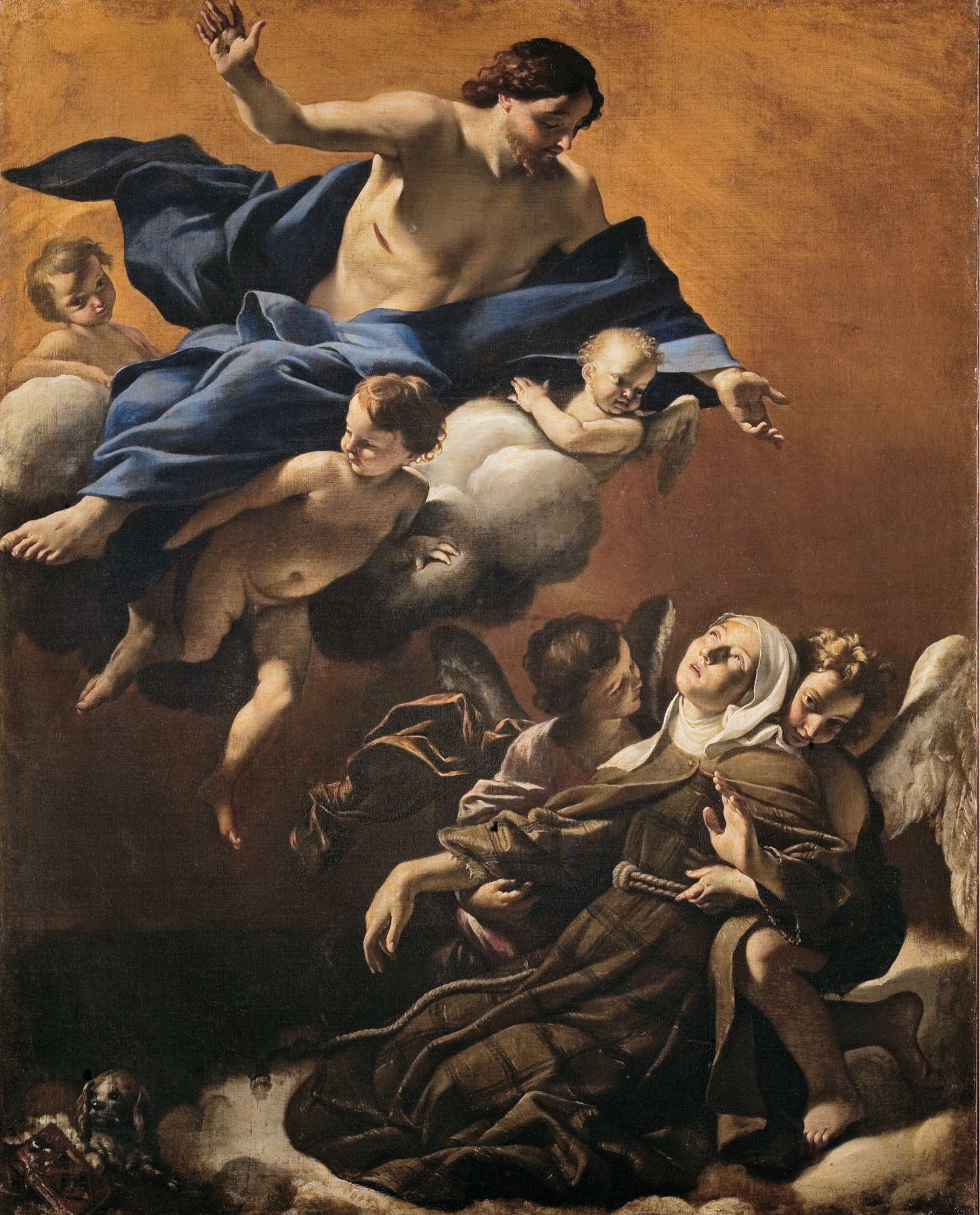
Ecstasy of St. Margaret of Cortona, 1622, Palazzo Pitti, Florence

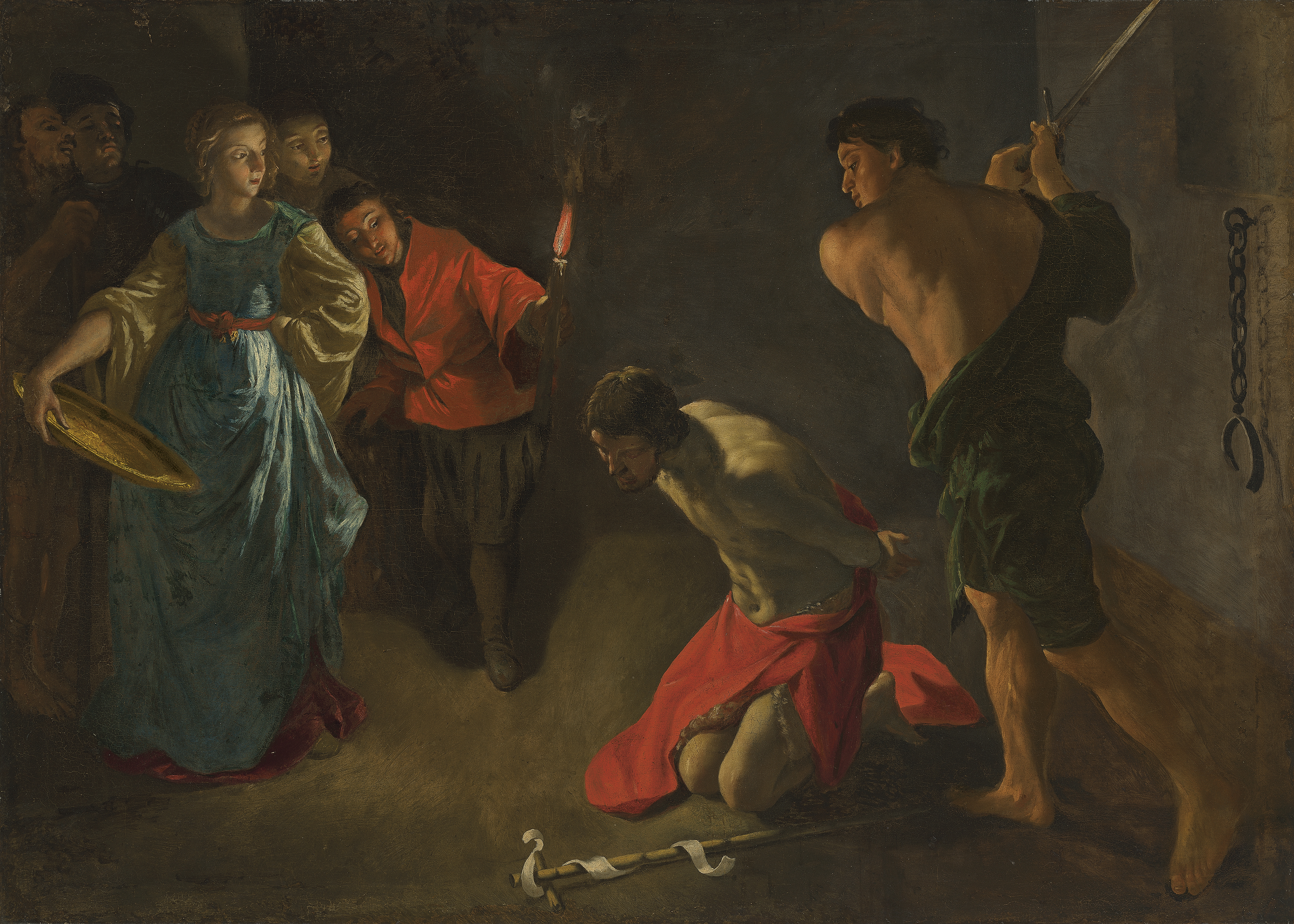
Execution of St. John the Baptist, c. 1640, priv. col.

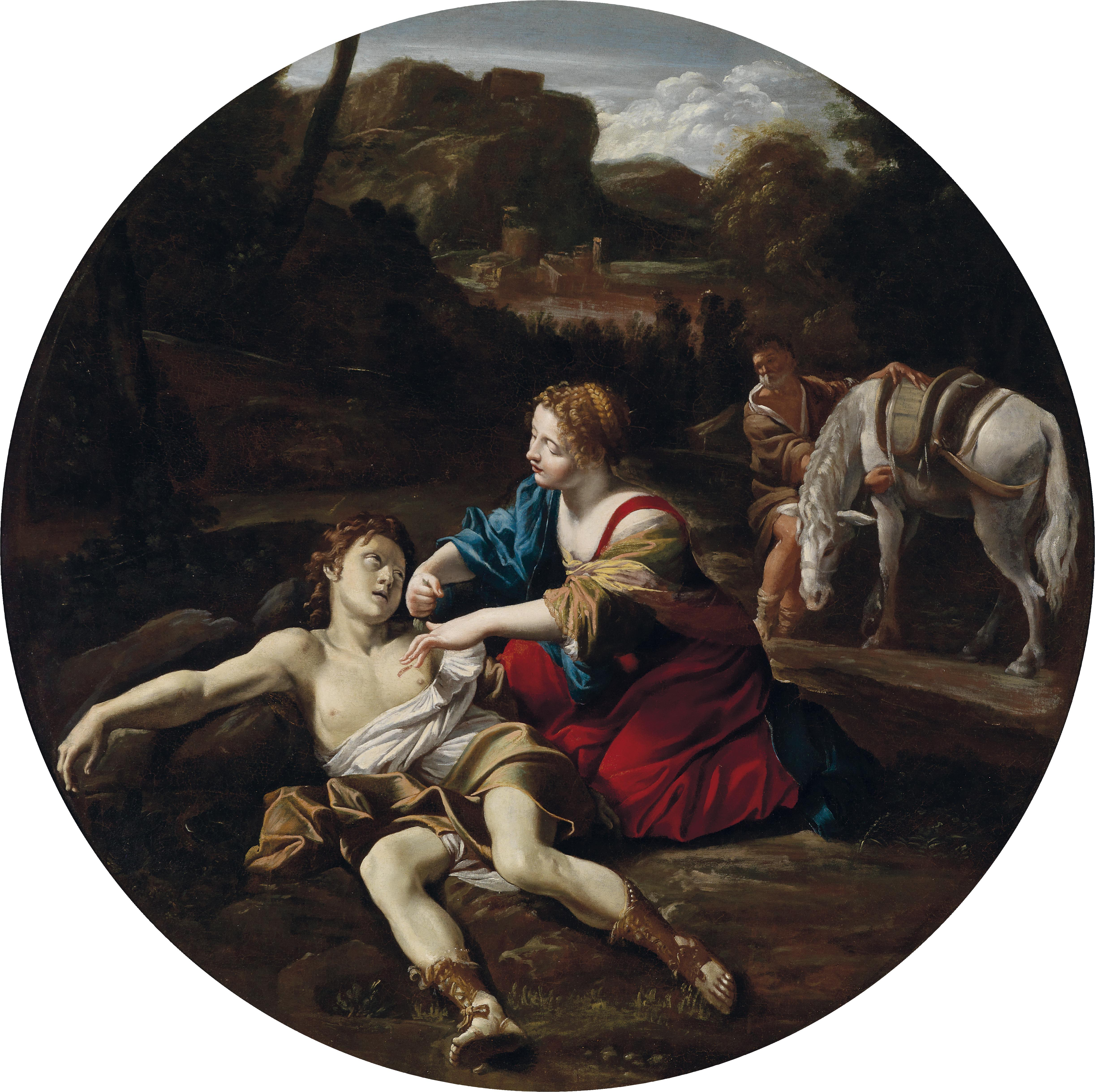
Angelica and Medoro, priv. col.

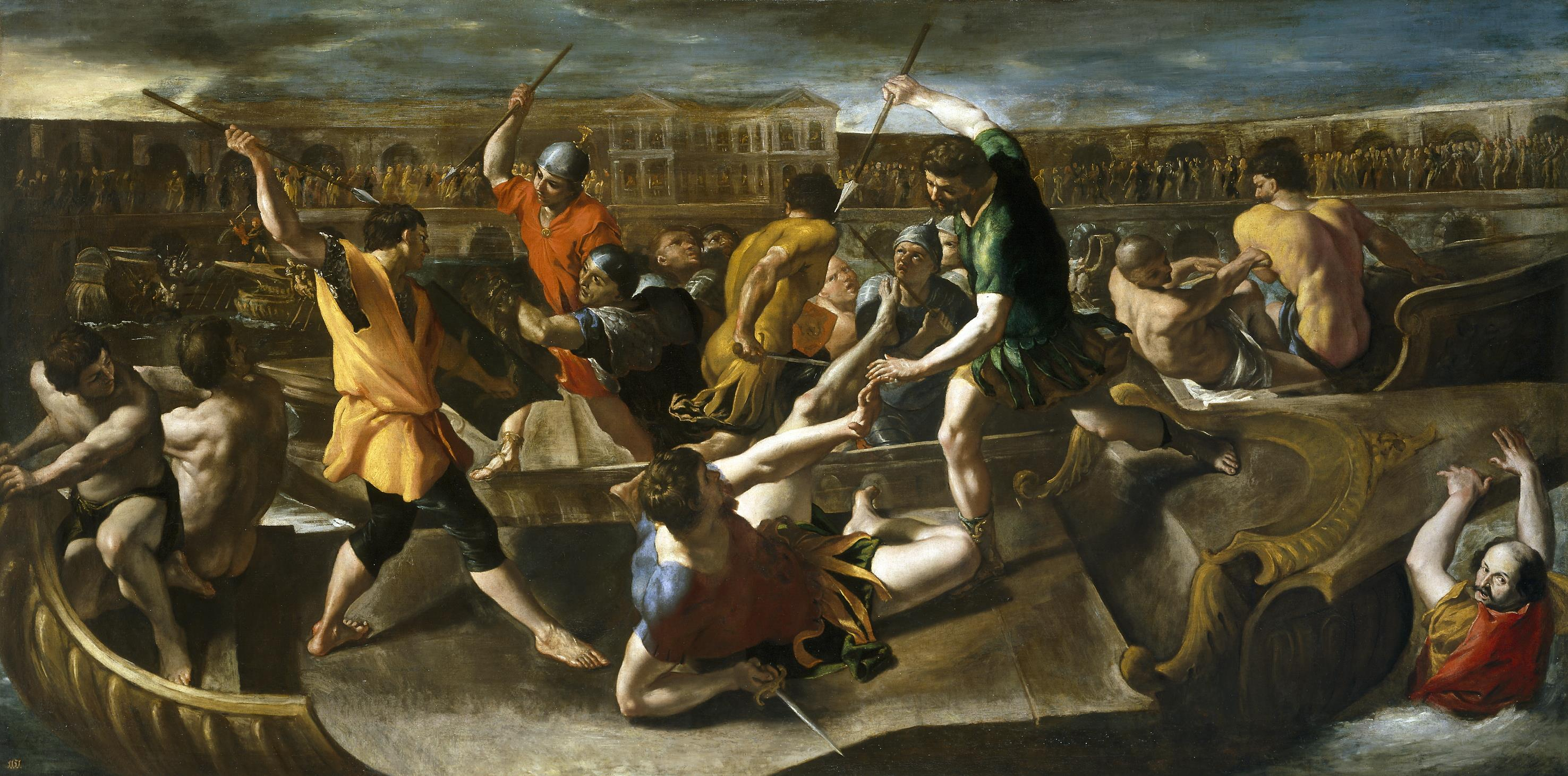
Naumachia, c. 1635-1638, Museo del Prado, Madrid

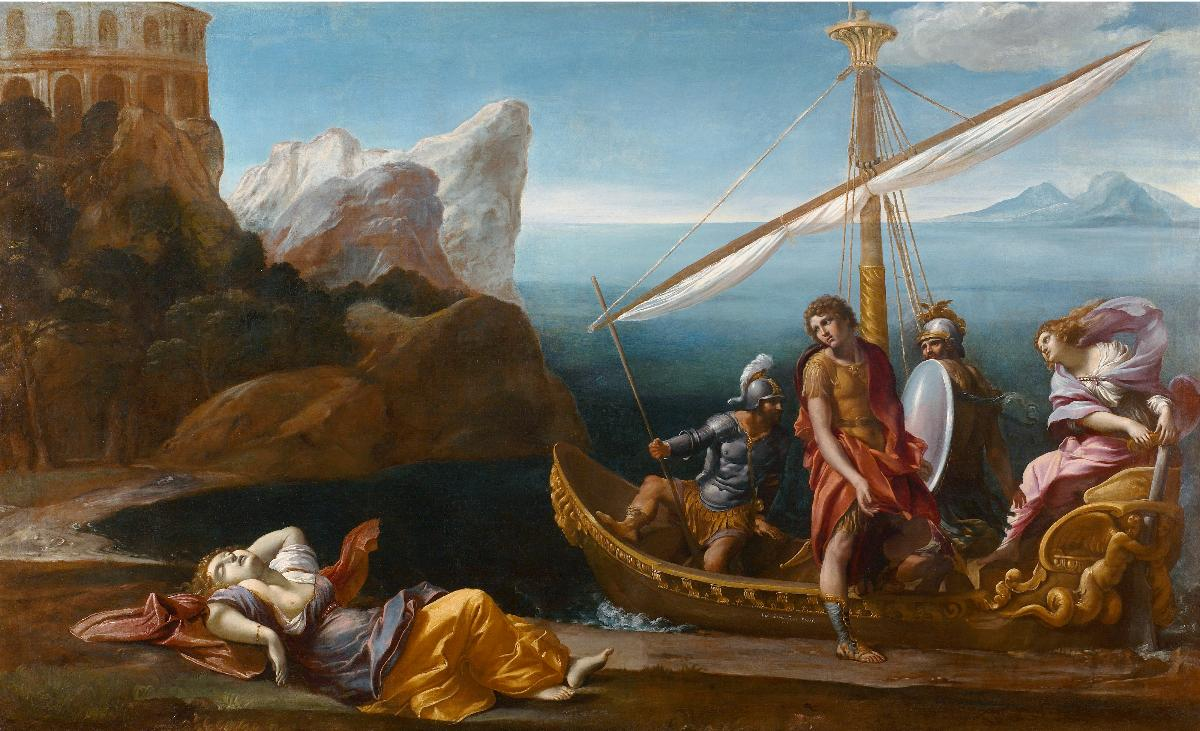
Rinaldo's farewell to Armida, 1614, oil on canvas, Kunsthaus Zürich

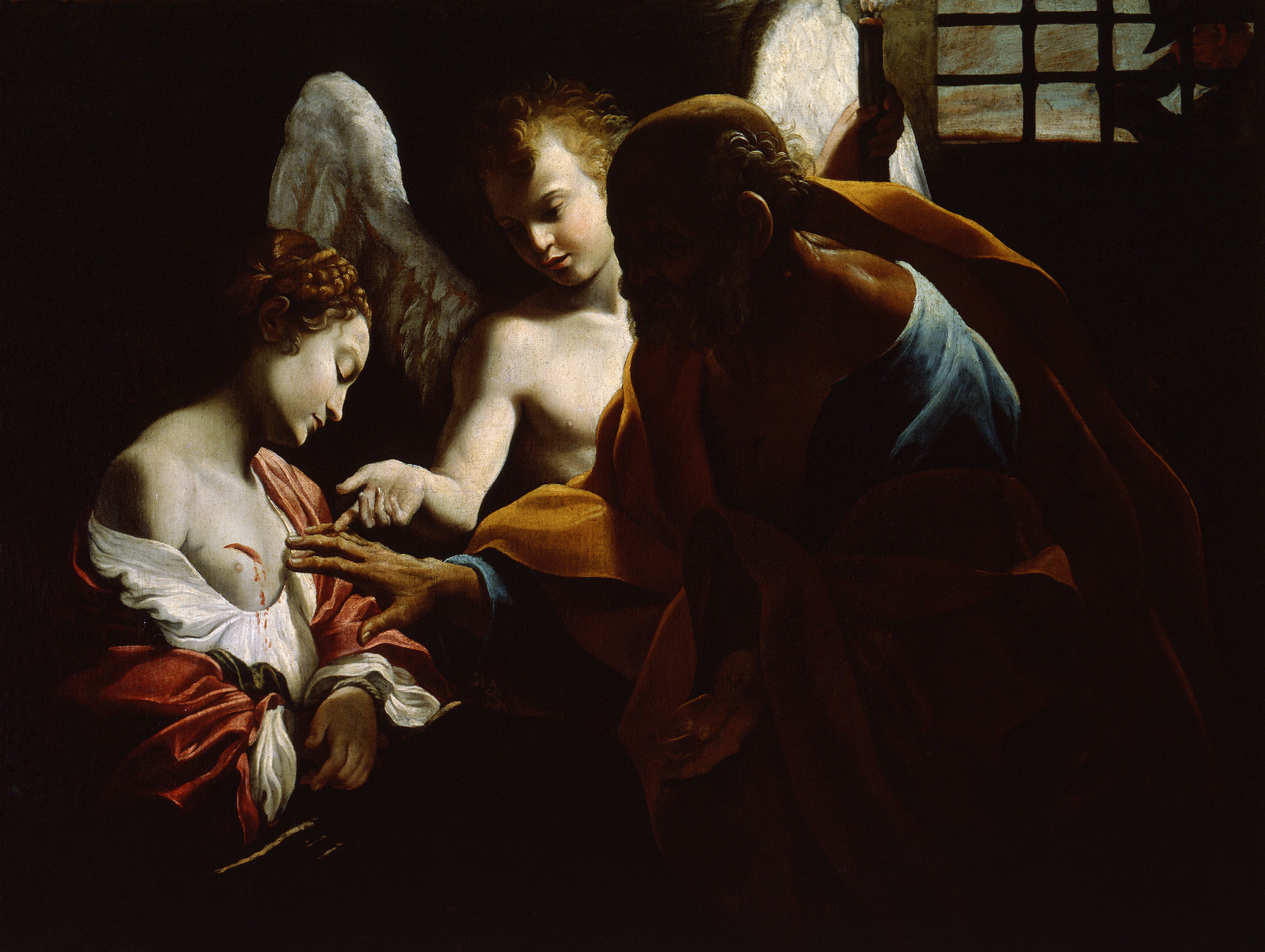
St. Agatha Visited in Prison by St. Peter and the Angel, Galleria nazionale di Parma

== Sources ==
- This article incorporates text from a publication now in the public domain: Williamson, G. C. (1910). "Giovanni Lanfranco". In Herbermann, Charles (ed.). Catholic Encyclopedia. Vol. 8. New York: Robert Appleton Company.
- Bellori, Giovanni Pietro (1672). The Lives of the Artists. Rome: Mascardi. pp. 365–382.
- Salerno, Luigi (1952). "The Early Work of Giovanni Lanfranco". The Burlington Magazine. 94 (592): 188–196. JSTOR 871063.
- Francis P. Smyth and John P. O'Neill, ed. (1986). The Age of Correggio and the Carracci: Emilian Painting of the 16th and 17th Centuries. Washington: National Gallery of Art. pp. 483–493.
- Wittkower, Rudolf (1993). Art and Architecture Italy, 1600–1750. Harmondsworth: Penguin Books. pp. 80–88.
- Erich Schleier, ed. (1981). Disegni di Giovanni Lanfranco (1582–1646): catalogo della mostra. Firenze: Olschki.
- Erich Schleier, ed. (2001). Giovanni Lanfranco: un pittore barocco tra Parma, Roma e Napoli. Milano: Electa.
- Schleier, Erich (2004). "LANFRANCO, Giovanni". Dizionario Biografico degli Italiani (in Italian). Vol. 63: Labroca–Laterza. Rome: Institute of the Italian Encyclopaedia. ISBN 978-88-12-00032-6.
- Erich Schleier, ed. (2006). Dello stile naturale: die Zeichnungen des Giovanni Lanfranco; museum kunst palast, Sammlung der Kunstakademie Düsseldorf. Düsseldorf: Museum Kunstpalast/Dt. Kunstverlag.
- Cropper, Elizabeth (2005). The Domenichino Affair: Novelty, Imitation, and Theft in Seventeenth-century Rome. New Haven and London: Yale University Press. ISBN 978-0300109146.
- Chilvers, I. (2015). "Lanfranco, Giovanni". The Oxford Dictionary of Art and Artists (5th ed.). Oxford: Oxford University Press. ISBN 978-0-19-102417-7.
