= Ecstasy of Saint Margaret of Cortona =

Painting by Giovanni Lanfranco

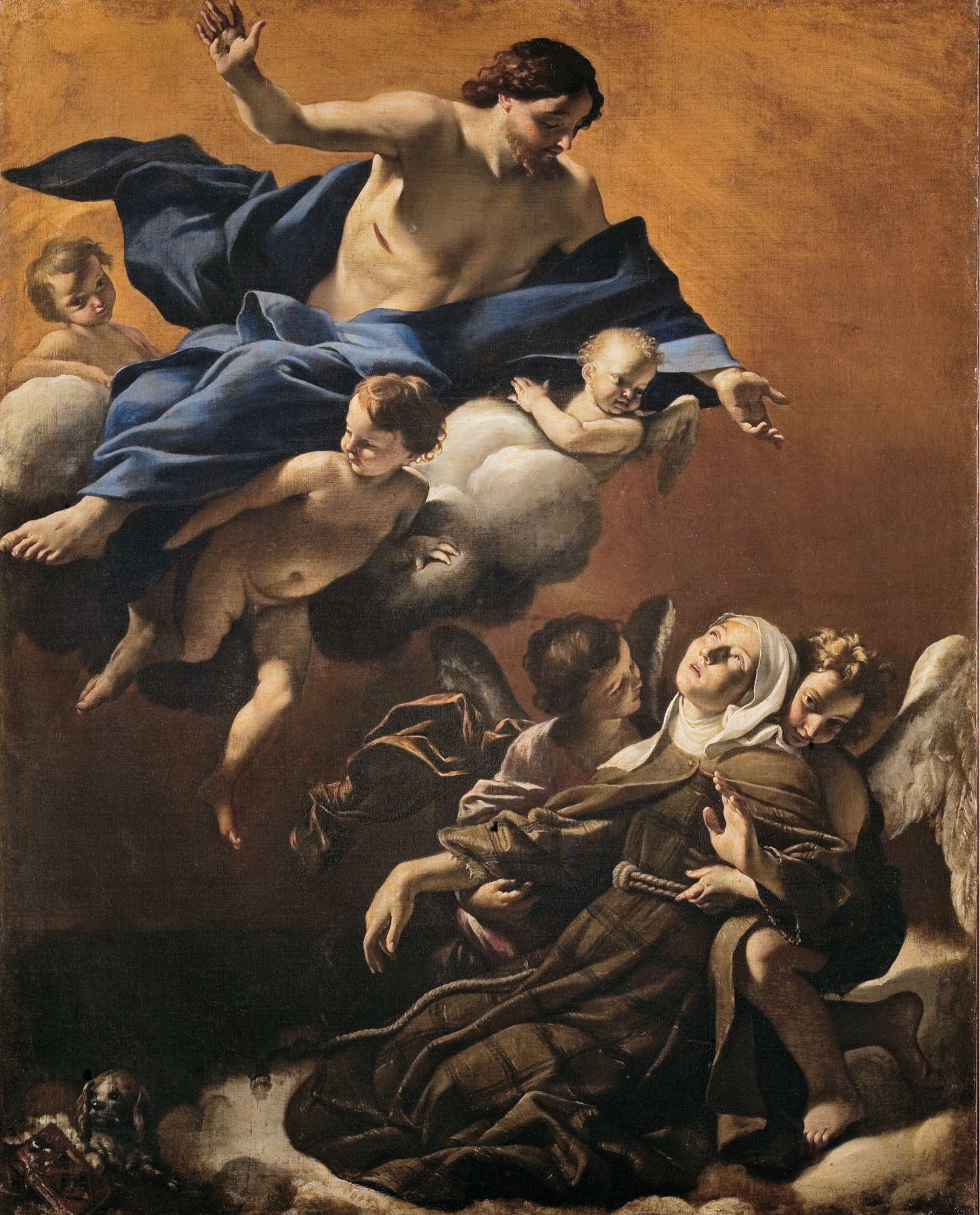
- Artist: Giovanni Lanfranco
- Year: 1622
- Medium: Oil on canvas
- Dimensions: 230 cm × 185 cm (91 in × 73 in)
- Location: Pitti Palace; Florence

The Ecstasy of Saint Margaret of Cortona is an oil painting on canvas by the Italian Baroque painter Giovanni Lanfranco, executed in 1622. It is in the Palatine Gallery of the Pitti Palace in Florence, Italy.

== Description ==
The painting depicts a mystical event occurring to the 13th-century Franciscan tertiary, Margaret of Cortona. In the painting, she swoons while held up by two angels, while having a vision of a Christ aloft on a cloud, showing her his stigmata. Margaret narrated that in the vision Christ called her "my beloved daughter". Margaret's waist is girded with the rope cincture that characterizes members of the Franciscan orders. The small dog at her feet is a common feature of her iconography; it recalls the story that her dog found the body of her murdered lover, an event which triggered her movement towards an eremitic life. The bare background is dark but rises to a luminous gilded light surrounding the figure of Christ. The Baroque arrangement by Lanfranco places the figures along a diagonal in the canvas and grants a realistic solidity to the characters, focusing the attention on Margaret's psychic state and not only her overpowering miraculous vision. The veneration of Saint Margaret of Cortona was prominent in Tuscany.

The painting was commissioned in 1622 by Nicolo Gerolamo Venuti, whose coat of arms is at the lower left, and decorated the main altar for the church of Santa Maria Nuova in Cortona. It was purchased for the palace by Prince Ferdinand de' Medici, who provided to the church a replacement canvas on the same subject by Giuseppe Maria Crespi. That painting is now in the Diocesan Museum of Cortona.

Lanfranco in his design appears to show the influence of Caravaggio's Saint Francis in Ecstasy (1596). In turn, this painting may have influenced the design of the statuary group (1645–1662) of the Ecstasy of Saint Teresa by Gian Lorenzo Bernini.
