= Venus Playing the Harp =

Painting by Giovanni Lanfranco

Venus Playing the Harp (Allegory of Music)
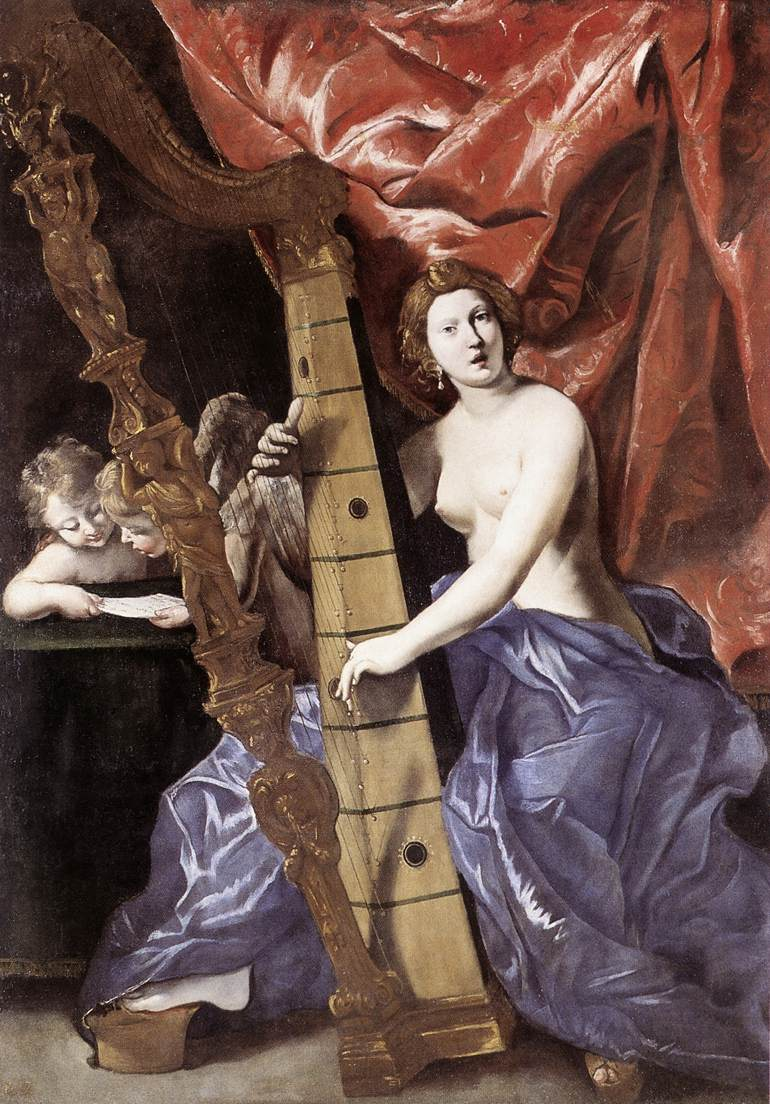
- Artist: Giovanni Lanfranco
- Year: c. 1634
- Medium: Oil on canvas
- Dimensions: 214 cm × 150 cm (84 in × 59 in)
- Location: Galleria Nazionale d'Arte Antica; Rome

Venus Playing the Harp (also known as an Allegory of Music) is a painting by the Italian Baroque painter Giovanni Lanfranco. It is housed in the Galleria Nazionale d'Arte Antica at Palazzo Barberini, Rome.

== Description ==
The work was painted by Lanfranco prior to his departure in 1634 for Naples. It was made for the musician Marco Marazzoli, also called Marco dell'Arpa ('Marco of the Harp') for his skill with the instrument. The semi-disrobed female playing the instrument in the painting is identified with Venus by virtue of the amoretti in the background. The engraved bees on the wooden triple harp identify it as belonging to the Barberini family. This instrument is on display in the Museo degli Strumenti Musicali in Rome. Marazzoli, after his death, left it to his patron the cardinal Antonio Barberini.
