= San Sepolcro, Piacenza =

Church and convent in Piacenza, Italy

Coordinates: 45.0552°N 9.685°E

San Sepolcro is a Renaissance style, Roman Catholic church and convent, located in Piacenza, Italy.

== History ==
The church at the site was first built in the mid-10th century, under the patronage of a recent pilgrim to the Holy Land, but then destroyed. By 1055, a Benedictine abbey with hospital, was located here, at a site outside of the ancient wall of the city. This too fell victim to the wars and depredations. In 1484, the ruined site was ceded for a monastery of the Olivetans. The Church was designed by Alessio Tramello, was built between 1513 and 1534, and again entitled Holy Sepulchre. By 1534, the convent was constructed. Neither the more ancient front nor the current portal, seem attributable to the Tramello. In 1602, Antonio Beduschi painted the Martyrdom of St. Stephen and a Pietà for the church.

During the Napoleonic period (1796), the church was deconsecrated and converted into a military hospital and stable. The Olivetan parish priests moved to the church of the Annunziata, then San Bartolomeo. In 1903, Bishop Scalabrini reconsecrated the church.

The convent is now part of the City Hospital. The interior is decorated with a chiaroscuro fresco that winds like a ribbon on top of the supporting arches of the nave. The sanctuary houses sculptures by Paolo Perotti.
