= Antonio Beduschi =

Italian painter

Antonio Beduschi (1576– alive 1607) was an Italian painter active in the early-Baroque period, mainly in his hometown of Cremona. He imitated the style of Antonio Campi. His sister, Angela Beduschi, was also a painter. In 1602, he painted the Martyrdom of St. Stephen and a Pietà for the church of San Sepolcro in Piacenza.
