= List of Parmese consorts =

This is a list of the consorts of the Duchy of Parma, a historical state in northern Italy. The duchy was established in 1545 and passed through several ruling houses, including the House of Farnese, the House of Bourbon-Parma, and the House of Habsburg. The list includes the spouses of the ruling dukes and duchesses.

== Consorts of Parma ==
=== House of Farnese, 1545–1731 ===
Picture	Name	Father	Birth	Marriage	Became Duchess	Ceased to be Duchess	Death	Spouse
	Girolama Orsini	Luigi Orsini, Count of Pitigliano (Orsini)	1504	1519	19 August 1545 husband's accession	10 September 1547 husband's death	1570	Peter Louis
	Margaret of Austria	Charles V, Holy Roman Emperor (Habsburg)	28 December 1522	4 November 1538	10 September 1547 husband's accession	18 January 1586		Octavius
	Margherita Aldobrandini	Gian Francesco Aldobrandini, Prince of Rossano (Aldobrandini)	29 March 1588	7 May 1600		5 March 1622 husband's death	9 August 1646	Ranuccio I
	Margherita de' Medici	Cosimo II de' Medici, Grand Duke of Tuscany (Medici)	31 May 1612	11 October 1628		11 September 1646 husband's death	6 February 1679	Edward
	Margaret Yolande of Savoy	Victor Amadeus I, Duke of Savoy (Savoy)	15 November 1635	29 April 1660		29 April 1663		Ranuccio II
	Isabella d'Este	Francesco I d'Este (Este)	3 October 1635	18 February 1664		17 August 1666		Ranuccio II
	Maria d'Este	Francesco I d'Este (Este)	8 December 1644	1 October 1668		20 August 1684		Ranuccio II
	Dorothea Sophie of Neuburg	Philip William, Elector Palatine (Wittelsbach)	5 July 1670	8 December 1695		26 May 1727 husband's death	15 September 1748	Francis
	Enrichetta d'Este	Rinaldo d'Este, Duke of Modena (Este)	27 May 1702	26 February 1727	26 May 1727 husband's accession	26 February 1731 husband's death	30 January 1777	Anthony

=== House of Bourbon-Anjou, 1731–1735 ===
None

=== House of Habsburg, 1735–1748 ===
Picture	Name	Father	Birth	Marriage	Became Duchess	Ceased to be Duchess	Death	Spouse
	Elisabeth Christine of Brunswick-Wolfenbüttel	Louis Rudolph, Duke of Brunswick-Lüneburg (Welf)	28 August 1691	1 August 1708	1735 husband's accession	20 October 1740 husband's death	21 December 1750	Emperor Charles VI

=== House of Bourbon-Parma, 1748–1802 ===
Picture	Name	Father	Birth	Marriage	Became Duchess	Ceased to be Duchess	Death	Spouse
	Louise-Élisabeth of France	Louis XV of France (Bourbon)	14 August 1727	25 October 1739	18 October 1748 husband's accession	6 December 1759		Philip
	Maria Amalia of Austria	Francis I, Holy Roman Emperor (Habsburg-Lorraine)	26 February 1746	19 July 1769		9 October 1802 husband's death	18 June 1804	Ferdinand

=== House of Habsburg, 1814–1847 ===
Picture	Name	Father	Birth	Marriage	Became Consort	Ceased to be Consort	Death	Spouse
	Napoleon Bonaparte	Carlo Buonaparte (Bonaparte)	15 August 1769	1 April 1810	11 April 1814 wife's accession	5 May 1821 death	5 May 1821	Marie-Louise

=== House of Bourbon-Parma, 1847–1859 ===
Picture	Name	Father	Birth	Marriage	Became Duchess	Ceased to be Duchess	Death	Spouse
	Maria Teresa of Savoy	Victor Emmanuel I of Sardinia (Savoy)	19 September 1803	5 September 1820	17 December 1847 husband's accession	19 April 1849 husband's abdication	16 July 1879	Charles II
	Louise Marie of France	Charles Ferdinand, Duke of Berry (Bourbon)	21 September 1819	10 November 1845	19 April 1849 husband's accession	27 March 1854 husband's death	1 February 1864	Charles III
