= Francesco Farnese =

Duke of Parma and Piacenza from 1694 to 1727

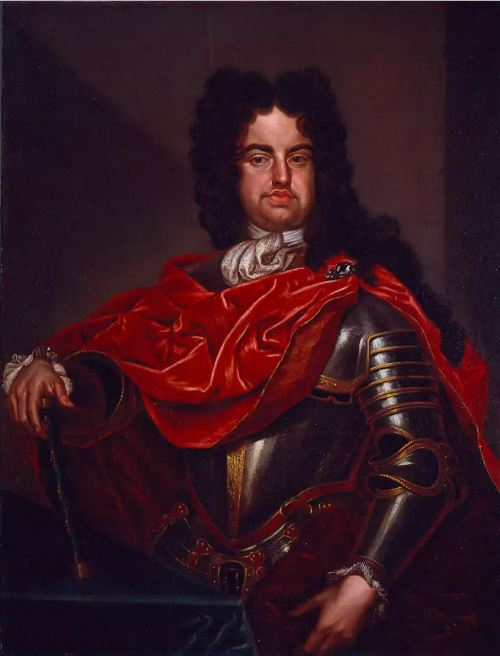
- Attributed to Ilario Spolverini, c. 1710–1720

Duke of Parma and Piacenza
- Reign: 11 December 1694 – 26 February 1727
- Predecessor: Ranuccio II
- Successor: Antonio
- Born: 19 May 1678; Parma, Duchy of Parma and Piacenza
- Died: 26 February 1727 (aged 48); Parma, Duchy of Parma and Piacenza
- Spouse: Dorothea Sophia of Neuburg (m. 1696)
- House: House of Farnese
- Father: Rannuccio II Farnese
- Mother: Maria d'Este
- Religion: Roman Catholicism

Francesco Farnese (19 May 1678 – 26 February 1727) reigned as the seventh Farnese Duke of Parma and Piacenza from 1694 until his death. He was the second son of Ranuccio II Farnese and Maria d'Este of Modena. His marriage to Dorothea Sophia of the Palatinate, his brother Odoardo's widow, was undertaken in order to avoid the return of her dowry.

Francesco curtailed court expenditure, which had been enormous under his father and predecessor, Ranuccio II, and sought to prevent the occupation of his Duchy of Parma, nominally a Papal fief, during the War of the Spanish Succession. However, despite his efforts otherwise, Duke Francesco saw Parma declared a fief of the Duchy of Milan, an Austrian province in Italy, towards the end of the war. His inability to produce offspring, combined with his brother Antonio's barrenness, led to the accession of his niece the Queen of Spain's eldest son, Don Carlos, in 1731.

== Biography ==
The second son of Ranuccio II Farnese and Maria d'Este of Modena, Francesco, born in 1678, ascended to his father's domain at the age of 16 on 11 December 1694. Ranuccio II left Parma, a small, landlocked northern-Italian duchy of little political significance, deeply in debt, largely thanks to his extravagant court. Therefore, rather than see her dowry revert to her brother the Elector Palatine, Francesco married his brother Odoardo's cranky widow, Dorothea Sophia of Neuburg.

In 1700, upon the death of Charles II of Spain without an ostensible heir, the War of the Spanish Succession broke out between France and Austria. Duke Francesco, anxious to keep foreign troops out of his duchy, adopted a policy of neutrality; Prince Eugene of Savoy occupied parts of the Farnese territories, however. When Francesco complained of this to Prince Eugene's employer, the Austrian Emperor Leopold I, the Emperor replied that he would be duly compensated at a later date. Towards the end of the war, Austria, now ruled by Leopold's son Joseph I, disregarded its promise of reparations and, as part of a concordat with the church, declared Parma its fief.

With the help of Giulio Alberoni, Francesco married his pock-marked niece and stepdaughter, Elisabetta, to Philip V of Spain, the French claimant to the thrones of Spain, in 1714. Francesco wanted Elisabetta's eldest son, Don Carlos, to ascend the Farnese dominions when his brother and heir, Antonio, died. Francesco, therefore, tried to dissuade Antonio from marrying and perpetuating his line, a plan which worked for the duration of Francesco's lifetime. Antonio, though married to Enrichetta d'Este of Modena, died childless in 1731, paving the way for Don Carlos's accession. Don Carlos, however, left Parma four years later for the Kingdom of Naples, bringing with him all the Farnese treasures, including the Ducal Palace's marble staircase.

== Ancestors ==
Ancestors of Francesco Farnese

8. Ranuccio I Farnese, Duke of Parma
4. Odoardo Farnese, Duke of Parma
9. Margherita Aldobrandini
2. Ranuccio II Farnese, Duke of Parma
10. Cosimo II de' Medici, Grand Duke of Tuscany
5. Margherita de' Medici
11. Maria Maddalena of Austria
1. Francesco Farnese, Duke of Parma
12. Alfonso III d'Este, Duke of Modena
6. Francesco I d'Este, Duke of Modena
13. Isabella of Savoy
3. Maria d'Este
14. Ranuccio I Farnese, Duke of Parma (= 8)
7. Maria Caterina Farnese
15. Margherita Aldobrandini (= 9)

Francesco Farnese House of Farnese Born: 29 May 1679 Died: 26 February 1731
Regnal titles
Preceded by Ranuccio II Farnese	Duke of Parma and Piacenza; 1694–1727	Succeeded by Antonio Farnese
Religious titles
Preceded by Giovanni Andrea II Angeli	Grand Master of the Sacred Military Constantinian Order of Saint George; 1698–1727	Succeeded by Antonio Farnese
