= Sanctuary of Santa Maria della Steccata =

Church in Parma, Italy

Coordinates: 44°48′09″N 10°19′39″E

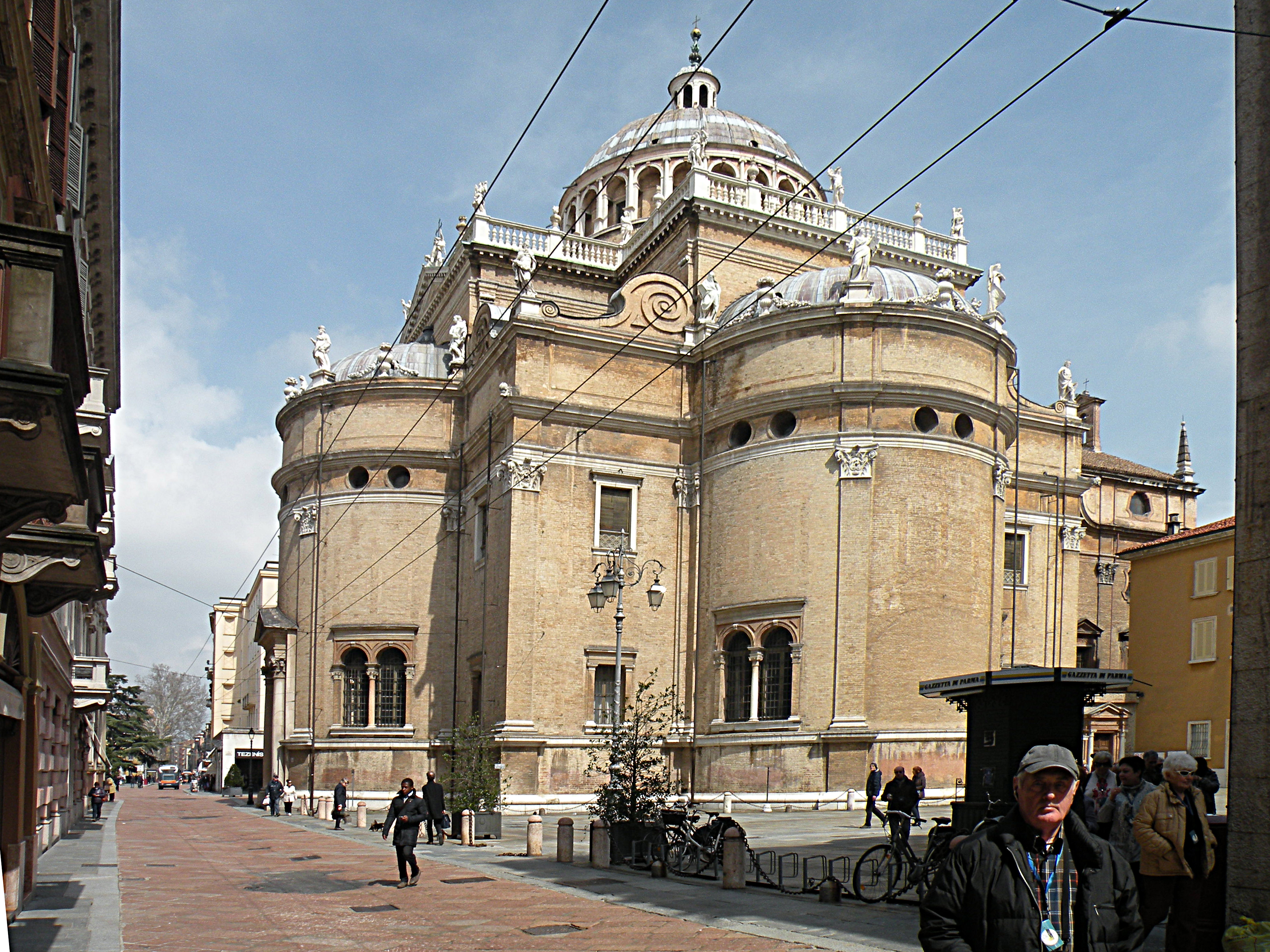
Shrine of Santa Maria della Steccata.

The Basilica of Santa Maria della Steccata is a Greek-cross design Renaissance church in central Parma, Italy. The name derives from the fence (Italian: steccato) in the church. A Nursing Madonna is enshrined within, crowned on 27 May 1601 by a Marian devotee, Fray Giacomo di Forli of the Capuchin order. Pope Benedict XVI raised the Marian sanctuary to the status of a Basilica minor on 9 February 2008.

Since 1718 it is the main church (as church of the Grand Master or "Magistral Church") of the Sacred Military Constantinian Order of Saint George (the Parmesan branch is independent since 1817 and still awarded by the House of Bourbon-Parma). The complex hosts also the Constantinian Museum of Steccata.

== History ==
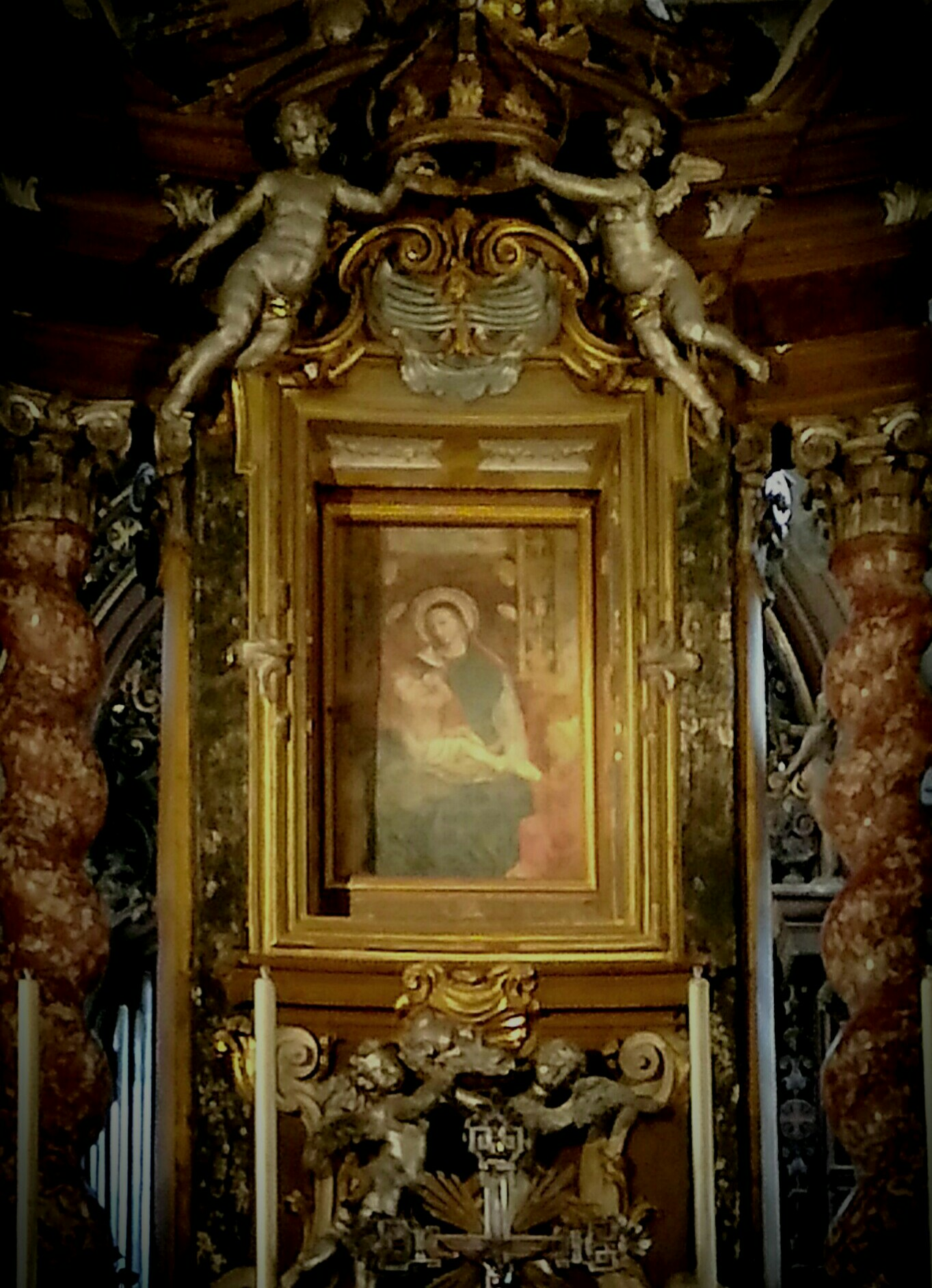
The Nursing Madonna enshrined and crowned by Jeronimo (Girolamo) Paolucci di Calboldi di Forli on 27 May 1601.

By 1492, the Knights of Malta built a small oratory here to house a putatively miraculous icon depicting Saint John the Baptist. It became associated with a religious confraternity in a neighboring house that had the image of the Madonna and Child, mentioned above, on the facade. Rumors of miracles performed by this image led to masses flocking to the site. This required the erection of a picket fence or stockade (steccato) around the icon, hence giving the image its name.

The Papal bull dated 1 March 1493 by Pope Alexander VI mentions the image by this name. The popularity of the icons led the frescoed icon to be detached from a wall and moved to the oratory, and when that proved too small to accommodate the crowds, the commune of Parma patronized the construction of the church (1521–1539).

== Architecture ==
The architects were Bernardino Zaccagni and his son, Giovanni Francisco, with modifications by Gian Francesco d'Agrate, who also worked on the statuary gracing the roof-line. The dome (1526–1527) is attributed to Agrate, although with the help by Antonio da Sangallo the Younger. The church was finally consecrated in 1539. The sacristy was rebuilt over the following centuries.

The layout is that mainly of a centralized Greek Cross church with four arms, although the entrance elongates through an arch to form the Coro dei Cavallieri. In the crossing is the majestic dome. Each arm has a half-dome, while between the arms are four corner chapels.

== Internal decor ==
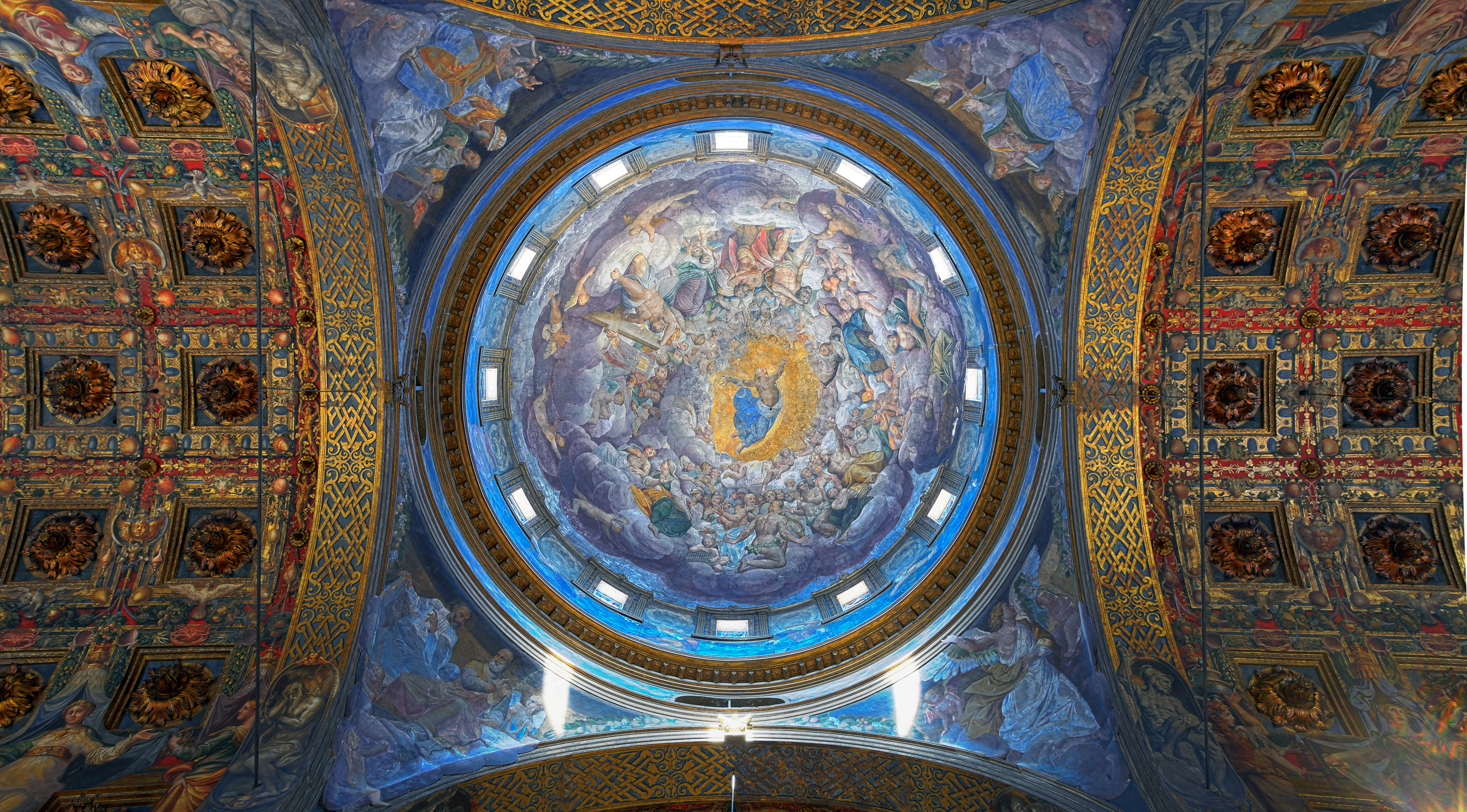
Bernardino Gatti, Assumption of Mary.

The interior was decorated by prominent artists, both local and foreign to Parma over the following centuries after completion of the building.

The tribune has a Baroque altar in the choir was begun by Mauro Oddi and completed in 1758-1765 by Andrea and Domenico della Meschina. The main altarpiece displays the famous icon inside a gilded frame replete with cherubs and putti and a gilded crown; the ensemble flanked by two King Solomonic columns flanked by two pillars. At the base are two statues, Saint Joseph and King David, sculpted by Francesco and Giovanni Baratta. In the hemicycle above the altar, is a large fresco depicting a Coronation of the Virgin with Saints (1541), painted by Michelangelo Anselmi. He also painted the adjacent ceiling fresco depicting the Adoration of the Magi. Behind the altar is a semicircle of wooden choir stalls.

In the sacristy and sanctuary, many of the fresco figures and decorations were painted or planned by a young Parmigianino, whilst the church also houses c. 1523 two oil on canvas paintings by him of Saint Cecilia and King David, both originally intended as organ doors.

Other artists include Bernardino Gatti, who frescoed parts of the ceiling. The Dutch painter Jan Soens painted a Holy Family. Giambettino Cignaroli painted a Trinity with Saints Niccolò, Basilius, and Gregory. A somewhat retrograde mannerist Madonna and Bambino, with Saints Joseph & George was painted by Marcantonio Franceschini in 1718. A mannerist Redeemer with St. Anthony of Padua and the Magdalen was painted by Girolamo Mazzola Bedoli, based on a commission from 1605 for the price of 60 ducats and 76 soldi. The Parmesan painter Aurelio Barili painted frescoes in 1588.

The church contains funeral monuments of Bertrando Rossi, Ottavio Farnese, Sforzino Sforza, and Adam Albert von Neipperg (by Lorenzo Bartolini).

== Dukes of Parma ==
In the crypt are the tombs of twenty-six members of the Farnese family including Alexander Farnese, Duke of Parma and his wife Infanta Maria of Portugal. Also the later (titular) Dukes of Parma and Piacenza (of the House of Bourbon-Parma) found here their final resting place. In a niche is a crystal urn containing the heart of Charles III, Duke of Parma.

On 28 August 2010, the body of Carlos Hugo, Duke of Parma, former Head of the House of Bourbon-Parma between 1977 and 2010 and ex-husband of Princess Irene of the Netherlands, was interred in the crypt.

On 29 September 2012, Carlos Hugo's granddaughter, Princess Luisa of Bourbon-Parma, second child of Carlos, Duke of Parma, was baptised at the church.

In 2021 and 2022, Princess María Teresa of Bourbon-Parma and Princess Cécile Marie of Bourbon-Parma were buried there, respectively.

== Burials ==
=== House of Farnese ===
- Duke Ottavio I Farnese (1524–1586), second Duke of Parma and Piacenza;
- Duke Alexander I Farnese (1545–1592), third Duke of Parma and Piacenza;
- Infanta Maria of Portugal (1538–1577), wife of Alexander Farnese, Crown Princess consort of Parma and Piacenza;
- Princess Margherita Farnese (1567–1643), daughter of Alexander I Farnese, Princess of Parma and Piacenza; Hereditary Princess of Mantua by marriage;
- Duke Ranuccio I Farnese (1569–1622), fourth Duke of Parma and Piacenza;
- Princess Margherita Aldobrandini (1588–1646), wife of Ranuccio I Farnese, Duchess consort of Parma and Piacenza;
- Duke Odoardo I Farnese (1612–1646), fifth Duke of Parma and Piacenza;
- Princess Margherita de' Medici of Tuscany (1612–1679), wife of Odoardo I Farnese, Duchess consort of Parma and Piacenza;
- Duke Ranuccio II Farnese (1630–1694), sixth Duke of Parma and Piacenza;
- Princess Margaret Yolande of Savoy (1635–1663), first wife of Ranuccio II Farnese, Duchess consort of Parma and Piacenza;
- Princess Isabella d'Este of Modena (1635–1666), second wife of Ranuccio II Farnese, Duchess consort of Parma and Piacenza;
- Princess Maria d'Este of Modena (1644–1684), third wife of Ranuccio II Farnese, Duchess consort of Parma and Piacenza;
- Prince Pietro Farnese (1639–1677), son of Odoardo I Farnese, Prince of Parma and Piacenza;
- Princess Margherita Maria Farnese (1664–1718), daughter of Ranuccio II Farnese, Princess of Parma and Piacenza; Duchess consort of Modena and Reggio by marriage;
- Prince Odoardo Farnese (1666–1693), son of Ranuccio II Farnese, Crown Prince of Parma and Piacenza;
- Countess Palatine Dorothea Sophie of Neuburg (1670–1748), wife of Crown Prince Odoardo Farnese, Crown Princess consort of Parma and Piacenza; she remarried Duke Francesco I Farnese, Duchess consort of Parma and Piacenza;
- Prince Alexander Ignazio Farnese (1691–1693), son of Crown Prince Odoardo Farnese, Prince of Parma and Piacenza;
- Princess Vittoria Farnese (1672–1672), daughter of Ranuccio II Farnese, Princess of Parma and Piacenza;
- Princess Caterina Farnese (1672–1672), daughter of Ranuccio II Farnese and twin of Vittoria Farnese, Princess of Parma and Piacenza;
- Princess Eleonora Farnese (1675–1675), daughter of Ranuccio II Farnese, Princess of Parma and Piacenza;
- Duke Francesco I Farnese (1678–1727), seventh Duke of Parma and Piacenza;
- Duke Antonio I Farnese (1679–1731), eighth Duke of Parma and Piacenza;

=== House of Bourbon-Parma ===
- Duke Philip I of Parma (1720–1765), twelfth Duke of Parma and Piacenza, first Duke of Guastalla;
- Prince Philip Maria of Parma (1783–1786), son of Duke Ferdinand I of Parma, Prince of Parma, Piacenza and Guastalla;
- Princess Maria Antonietta Luisa of Parma (1784–1785), daughter of Duke Ferdinand I of Parma, Princess of Parma, Piacenza and Guastalla;
- Princess Maria Luisa of Parma (1787–1789), daughter of Duke Ferdinand I of Parma, Princess of Parma, Piacenza and Guastalla;
- Princess Maria Enrichetta of Parma (1788–1799), daughter of Duke Ferdinand I of Parma, Princess of Parma, Piacenza and Guastalla;
- Duke Charles III of Parma (1823–1854), sixteenth Duke of Parma and Piacenza;
- Duke Carlos IV of Parma (1930–2010), twenty-third Duke of Parma and Piacenza (titular);
- Princess Marie Thérèse of Parma (1933–2020), sister of Carlos IV, Princess of Parma and Piacenza;
- Princess Cécile Marie of Parma (1935–2021), sister of Carlos IV, Princess of Parma and Piacenza.

== See also ==
- Category:Burials at the Sanctuary of Santa Maria della Steccata
