= Enrichetta d'Este =

Duchess of Parma from 1728 to 1731

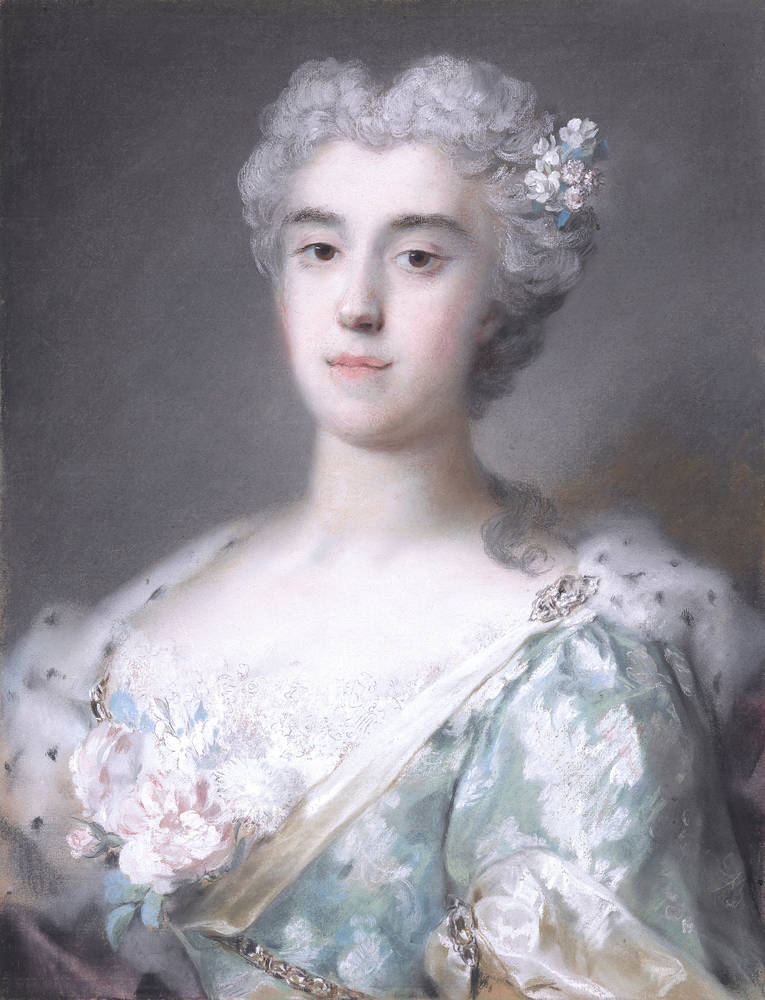
- Portrait by Rosalba Carriera, 1723 (Uffizi Gallery, Florence)

Duchess consort of Parma
- Tenure: 5 February 1728 – 20 January 1731
- Born: 27 February 1702; Ducal Palace of Modena, Duchy of Modena
- Died: 30 January 1777 (aged 74); Fidenza, Duchy of Parma and Piacenza
- Burial: Convent of the Capuciner, Fidenza, Parma
- Spouse: Antonio Farnese, Duke of Parma; Leopold of Hesse-Darmstadt
Names
- Enrichetta Maria d'Este
- House: Este (by birth); Farnese (by marriage); Hesse-Darmstadt (by marriage)
- Father: Rinaldo d'Este, Duke of Modena
- Mother: Charlotte of Brunswick-Lüneburg

Princess Enrichetta d'Este (Enrichetta Maria; 27 May 1702 – 30 January 1777) was a Duchess of Parma by marriage to her cousin Antonio Farnese, Duke of Parma. She was the Regent of Parma in 1731 during her alleged pregnancy in the interregnum after her husband's death.

== Biography ==
=== Early life ===
Princess Enrichetta was the third daughter of Rinaldo d'Este, Duke of Modena and Duchess Charlotte of Brunswick-Lüneburg. She was named after her maternal grandmother, Benedicta Henrietta of the Palatinate.

Her older brother Prince Francesco was the heir to the duchy of Modena. In 1720 Francesco married Charlotte Aglaé d'Orléans, the daughter of Philippe d'Orléans, the Régent of France during the childhood of King Louis XV. While at the Modenese court, Charlotte Aglaé got on well with Enrichetta and her older sisters Benedetta (1697–1777) and Amalia (1699–1778).

In 1725, Enrichetta was among the princesses seriously considered for marriage to Louis XV, when the list of the original 99 princesses had been reduced to seventeen. However, the French Prime minister, the Duke of Bourbon, regarded her to be of too inferior rank for the position of queen, and the unstable situation in her family a cause of rejection of her candidacy, and in the end she was removed from the list.

=== Duchess of Parma ===
Enrichetta was engaged to Antonio Farnese, Duke of Parma, whose mother Princess Maria d'Este was Enrichetta's aunt. They were married with magnificent ceremonies in Modena on 5 February 1728, with her brother Francesco acting as proxy for Antonio.

She travelled to Parma where she made a magnificent entry to the city on 6 July 1728, greeted at the Porta San Michele by crowds of cheerers and onlookers. Celebrations in the local area lasted as late as 1730. Antonio frequently visited the Modenese court and was close to Erichetta's brother.

The marriage had been arranged by Antonio's secretary of state, Count Anvidi, and Bori coerced an unwilling Antonio to marry Enrichetta, his friend Francesco's sister. The marriage, despite all Antonio's attempts at conception, was childless.

=== The regency issue ===
Antonio died on 20 January 1731. The previous day, he had announced that Enrichetta was pregnant; after his death, a Regency council for the potential heir was formed, consisting of Enrichetta, a bishop, the first Secretary of State and two gentlemen of the Court.

It was decided that, should the child be female, the duchy of Parma would revert to the Infante Don Carlos (then aged 12), eldest of the three sons of Elisabeth Farnese, wife of Philip V of Spain, niece of Antonio by his older half-brother Odoardo, who had been heir-apparent to the duchy but predeceased their father. Enrichetta was thus invested as Regent of Parma, supported by Imperial troops.

Her pregnancy was questioned by the Queen of Spain though her mother, Enrichetta's sister-in-law Countess Palatine Dorothea Sophie of Neuburg, who wished to defend the right of Don Carlos, as well as the Pope, who wished to retract the Duchy to the Papal State. However, she was supported by the Emperor, who opposed Spanish influence in Parma. Of the request of Spain, Enrichetta was examined in May 1731 by doctors confirming her pregnancy. The news was reported around Parma and then around the European courts. Her regency could thus continue, with support by the Emperor.

On 22 July however, the Second Treaty of Vienna officially recognised the right of the young Infante Don Charles as the Duke of Parma and Piacenza, pursuant to the Treaty of London (1718). When Spain demanded that the delivery of Enrichetta should be a public affair, the Emperor retracted his support to Enrichetta and discontinued the original plan to arranged a simulated birth.

Queen Elisabeth in Spain convinced her mother to have Enrichetta examined again on 13 September 1731; it was then reported that there was in fact no child, and the House of Farnese was extinct. Charles of Spain was thus recognised as Duke of Parma and Piacenza, deposing the regency of Enrichetta d'Este. Since Charles was still a minor, his maternal grandmother Dorothea Sophie of the Palatinate, Odoardo's widow, was named regent.

Shunned by her father's court in Modena, the dowager duchess moved into the Ducal Palace of Colorno, where she was under virtual house arrest with an escort of Swiss Guards. In December 1731, she was forced to return to the Ducal Palace in Parma in order to return the crown jewels of Parma to Dorothea, who was formally made head of the regency council on 29 December 1731.

She stayed in Parma, splitting her time between Piacenza, Borgo San Donnino and Cortemaggiore.

=== Second marriage ===
On 23 March 1740 in Piacenza, Enrichetta married Prince Leopold of Hesse-Darmstadt (1708-1764), younger son of Landgrave Philip of Hesse-Darmstadt and his wife, Princess Marie Ernestine of Croÿ Havré (1673–1714). Enrichetta and Leopold had no children.

Leopold died in 1764 leaving Enrichetta a widow for the second time. Enrichetta herself died on 30 January 1777 aged seventy four. She was buried at the Convent of the Capuchins, in Fidenza (now church of San Francesco).

== Ancestry ==
Ancestors of Enrichetta d'Este

16. Cesare d'Este, Duke of Modena
8. Alfonso III d'Este, Duke of Modena
17. Virginia de' Medici
4. Francesco I d'Este, Duke of Modena
18. Charles Emmanuel I, Duke of Savoy
9. Princess Isabella of Savoy
19. Infanta Catherine Michelle of Spain
2. Rinaldo d'Este, Duke of Modena
20. Carlo Barberini Duke of Monterotondo
10. Taddeo Barberini, Prince of Palestrina,
21. Costanza Magalotti
5. Lucrezia Barberini
22. Filippo I Colonna
11. Anna Colonna, Princess of Pagliano,
23. Lucrezia Tomacelli
1. Enrichetta d'Este
24. William, Duke of Brunswick-Lüneburg
12. George, Duke of Brunswick-Lüneburg
25. Dorothea of Denmark
6. John Frederick, Duke of Brunswick-Lüneburg
26. Louis V, Landgrave of Hesse-Darmstadt
13. Anne Eleonore of Hesse-Darmstadt
27. Magdalene of Brandenburg
3. Charlotte of Brunswick-Lüneburg
28. Frederick V, Elector Palatine
14. Edward, Count Palatine of Simmern
29. Elizabeth of England
7. Benedicta Henrietta of the Palatinate
30. Charles I, Duke of Mantua
15. Anna Gonzaga
31. Catherine of Mayenne
