= Odoardo Farnese =

Odoardo Farnese may refer to:

- Odoardo Farnese (cardinal) (1573–1626)
- Odoardo Farnese, Duke of Parma (1612–1646)
- Odoardo Farnese, Hereditary Prince of Parma (1666–1693)
