= Maria d'Este =

Duchess of Parma and Piacenza from 1668 to 1684

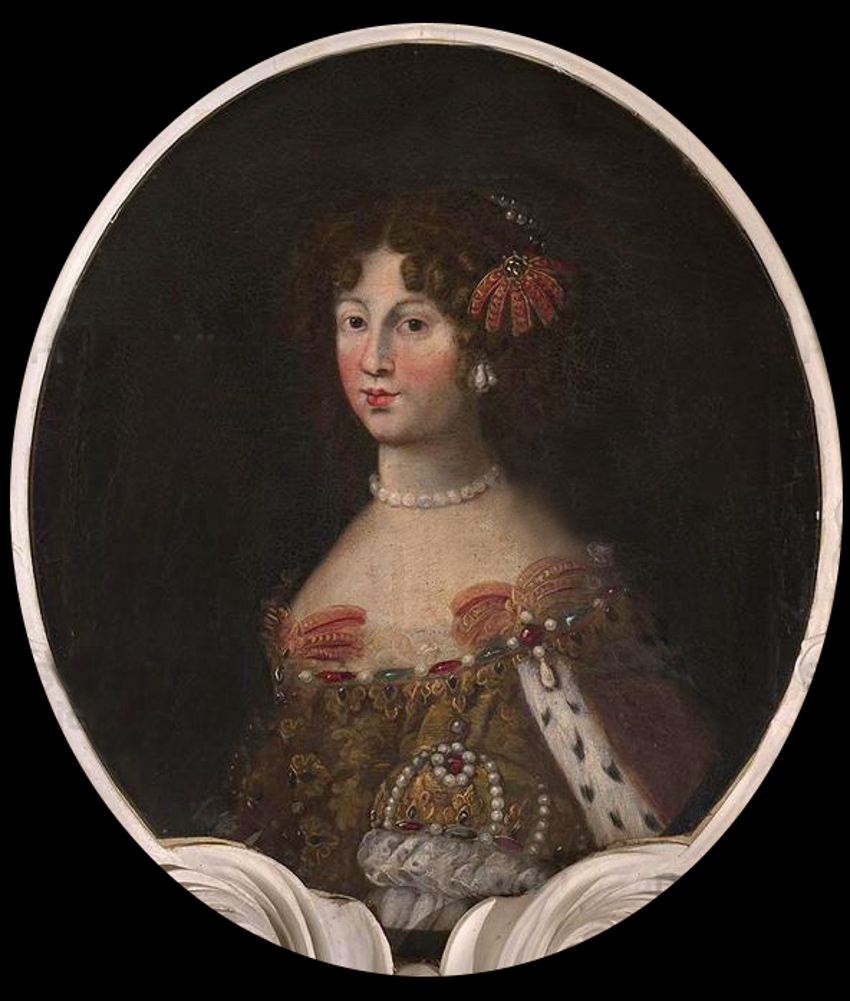

Duchess consort of Parma and Piacenza
- Tenure: 1 October 1668 – 20 August 1684
- Born: 8 December 1644; Modena, Duchy of Modena
- Died: 20 August 1684 (aged 39); Parma, Duchy of Parma and Piacenza
- Burial: 21 August 1684; Santa Maria della Steccata, Parma
- Spouse: Ranuccio II Farnese, Duke of Parma (m. 1668)
- Issue: Princess Isabella; Princess Vittoria; Princess Vittoria; Princess Caterina; Princess Eleonora; Francesco, Duke of Parma; Antonio, Duke of Parma
- House: House of Farnese; House of Este
- Father: Francesco I d'Este, Duke of Modena
- Mother: Maria Caterina Farnese

Maria d'Este (8 December 1644 – 20 August 1684) was a Modenese princess and Duchess of Parma as the wife of Ranuccio II Farnese, Duke of Parma. She was a daughter of Francesco I d'Este, Duke of Modena and Maria Caterina Farnese.

== Family ==
Maria was the eighth child and fourth daughter of Francesco I d'Este, the reigning Duke of Modena since 1629. Her mother was a daughter of Ranuccio I Farnese, Duke of Parma.

== Biography ==
Maria was born in Modena to Francesco I d'Este, Duke of Modena and his consort Maria Caterina Farnese. A member of the House of Este, she was a princess of Modena by birth.

In order to cement relations between the House of Farnese, Maria's older sister Isabella d'Este had been married to Ranuccio Farnese, Duke of Parma, son of Odoardo Farnese, Duke of Parma and Margherita de' Medici in 1664. Isabella died in 1666 as a result of childbirth. In order to preserve the union between the two ducal houses, the unmarried Maria became Ranuccio's next consort.

A wedding was signed by proxies in October 1667 and formally in Modena on 1 January 1668 she was duly married to the widowed Ranuccio Farnese. The marriage produced seven children; she also had two stillborn children. Out of the seven, three survived infancy, however none of them went on to have further children.

Maria died in Parma at the age of 39. Her husband survived her by ten years. Her two youngest sons, Francesco and Antonio, each became the Duke of Parma. Antonio was the last member of the House of Farnese, the duchy of Parma going to the Spanish House of Bourbon in 1731.

Maria was buried at the Sanctuary of Santa Maria della Steccata in Parma on 21 August 1684.

== Issue ==
1. Isabella Francesca Maria Lucia Farnese (14 December 1668 – 9 July 1718). She was a Benedictine nun in Santa Maria di Campagna Monastery of Piacenza;
2. Vittoria Maria Francesca Farnese (24 December 1669 – 15 September 1671);
3. A son (24 June 1671 – 28 June 1671);
4. Vittoria Farnese (19 November 1672), twin of Caterina;
5. Caterina Farnese (19 November 1672), twin of Vittoria;
6. A son (26 December 1674);
7. Eleonora Farnese (1 September 1675 – 3 November 1675);
8. Francesco Maria Farnese (19 May 1678 – 26 February 1727) succeeded as Duke of Parma; married Dorothea Sophie of the Palatinate, no issue;
9. Antonio Francesco Farnese, Duke of Parma (29 November 1679 – 20 January 1731) married Enrichetta d'Este, no issue.

== Ancestry ==
Ancestors of Maria d'Este

8. Cesare d'Este, Duke of Modena
4. Alfonso III d'Este, Duke of Modena
9. Virginia de' Medici
2. Francesco I d'Este, Duke of Modena
10. Charles Emmanuel I, Duke of Savoy
5. Isabella of Savoy
11. Infanta Catherine Michelle of Spain
1. Maria d'Este
12. Alexander Farnese, Duke of Parma
6. Ranuccio I Farnese, Duke of Parma
13. Infanta Maria of Guimarães
3. Maria Caterina Farnese
14. Giovanni Francesco Aldobrandini, Prince of Carpineto
7. Margherita Aldobrandini
15. Olimpia Aldobrandini
