= Antonio Farnese =

Duke of Parma from 1727 to 1731

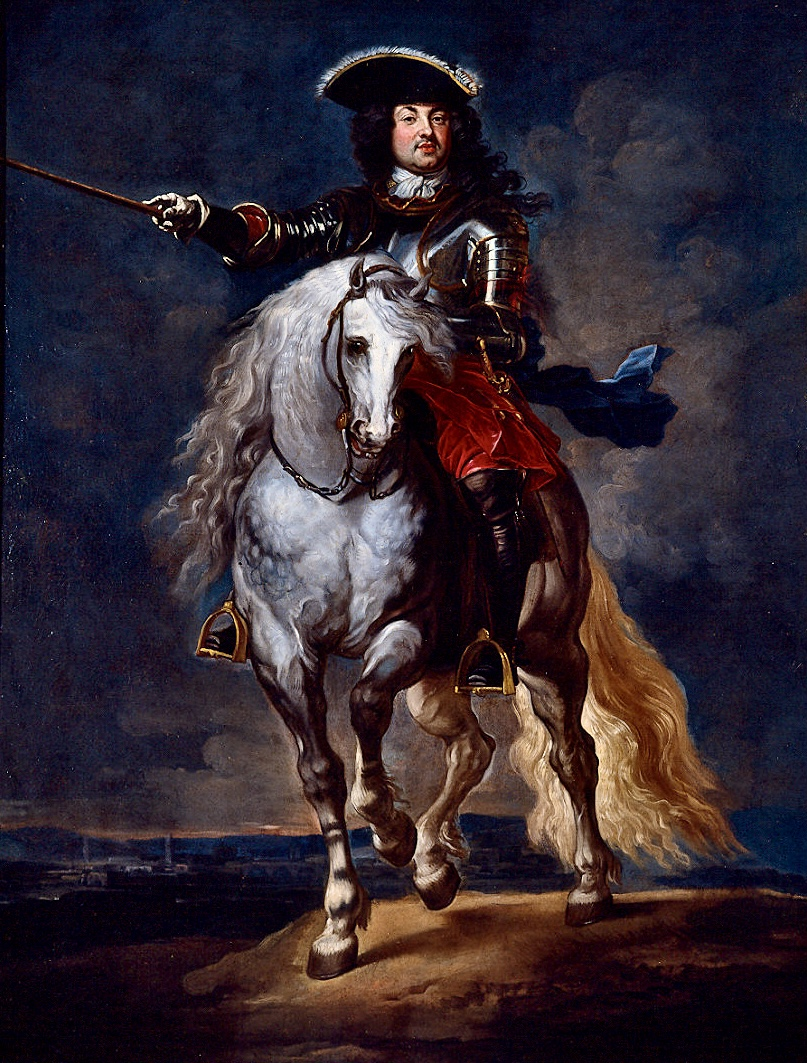
- Antonio Farnese on horseback by Ilario Spolverini

Duke of Parma
- Reign: 26 February 1727 – 20 January 1731
- Predecessor: Francesco
- Successor: Charles I
- Born: 29 November 1679; Parma, Duchy of Parma and Piacenza
- Died: 20 January 1731 (aged 51); Parma, Duchy of Parma and Piacenza
- Spouse: Enrichetta d'Este
- Antonio Farnese
- House: Farnese
- Father: Rannuccio II of Parma
- Mother: Maria d'Este
- Religion: Roman Catholicism

Antonio Farnese (29 November 1679 – 20 January 1731) was the eighth and final Farnese Duke of Parma and Piacenza. He married, in 1727, Enrichetta d'Este of Modena with the intention of begetting an heir. The marriage, however, was childless, leading to the succession of Charles of Spain, whose mother, Elisabeth Farnese, was Antonio's niece, to the ducal throne.

== Biography ==
Born in Parma, Antonio was the third son of Ranuccio II Farnese, Duke of Parma, and his wife Maria d'Este of the Modena. At the age of 18, Prince Antonio embarked on a Grand Tour of Europe with the intention of establishing contacts in courts across the continent; however, he simply dissipated 1,580,000 lire on galas.

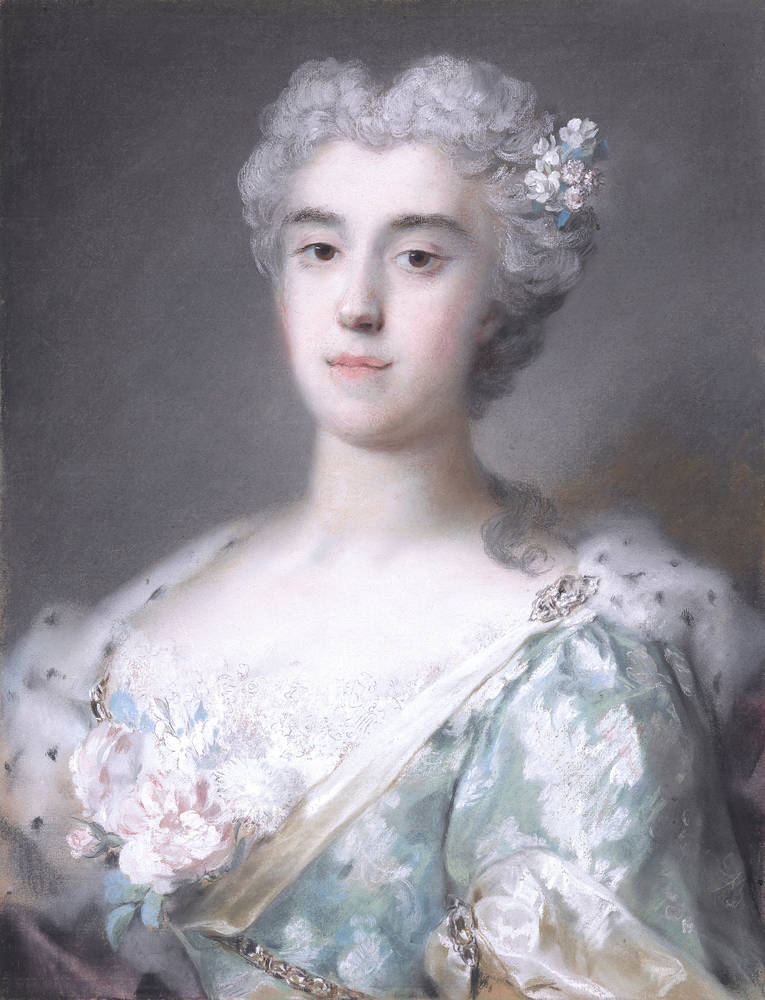
Enrichetta d'Este of Modena, Antonio's wife

As a prince he spent most of his time at the court of his cousin the Hereditary Prince of Modena, because his sister-in-law, Duchess Dorothea Sophia, banned masques and other merriments, distractions which Antonio revelled in. The castle of Sala, which he zealously enlarged and renovated, served as his Parmese residence. Here, Antonio threw lavish parties frequented by his favourite and mistress, the "domineering" Countess Margherita Bori Giusti.

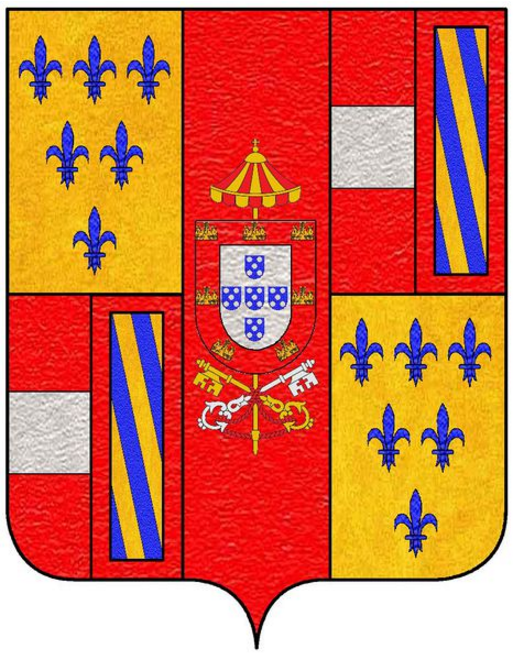
Arms of Antonio as Duke of Parma

By the time of his accession in February 1727, the morbidly obese Antonio had scant desire to rule. His life of hedonism continued unperturbed: he stayed up all night, sat for dinner one hour before dawn, played faro and basset and attended Countess Bori's salons on a daily basis. As there was no heir to the duchy, the secretary of state, Count Anvidi, and Bori coerced an unwilling Antonio to marry Enrichetta d'Este, the sister of his friend the Hereditary Prince of Modena. On 21 July 1727 the marriage contract was signed. His bride was adored by the people of Parma, and Antonio treated her kindly. The marriage, despite all Antonio's attempts at conception, was childless.

Spain, France, Great Britain, Austria and the Dutch Republic provided for the Parmese male-line succession failure in the Treaty of London (1718), agreeing that the heir to the duchy would be the Infante Charles (future Charles III of Spain), who was the eldest son of Elisabeth Farnese and Philip V of Spain. Believing the treaty would not remain in force, Elizabeth obtained in 1729 France's permission to install 6,000 Spanish troops in Parma. France further agreed to repudiate the Holy Roman Emperor Charles VI's claim of suzerainty over the duchy. An incensed Charles VI responded by stationing 40,000 soldiers in his Duchy of Milan, north of Parma. In the midst of the diplomatic fray Antonio died, ostensibly from a boil, caused, according to a contemporary, by often sporting "a wig that was too hot for him". Thus ended the House of Farnese, who for 184 years had served as sovereigns to Parma and Piacenza.

Six days after his death on 20 January 1731, Austrian troops marched into the Duchy of Parma and Piacenza, intent on staying there until Spain re-subscribed to the terms of the Treaty of London. However, it was soon discovered that Antonio's will left the country to "the pregnant stomach of my wife". A diplomatic flurry ensued. Pope Clement XII, the King of France, and Elisabeth Farnese doubted Enrichetta's pregnancy. They were correct: Austria convinced Enrichetta that she was pregnant to keep the Bourbons out of Italy long enough for it to occupy Parma. Upon discovering she was in fact not pregnant, Spain and Austria put aside their differences so as not to worsen the "precarious state of European affairs". The ensuing rapprochement saw Charles of Spain mount the ducal throne as a vassal of the Emperor. Charles, after resigning the throne of Parma in 1735, took all the Farnese treasures, including several pieces by Correggio, the Farnese Collection of Ancient sculpture, the Ducal library and archives and the Ducal Palace's marble staircase, with him to Naples, the seat of his new kingdom.

== Ancestors ==
Ancestors of Antonio Farnese

8. Ranuccio I Farnese, Duke of Parma
4. Odoardo Farnese, Duke of Parma
9. Margherita Aldobrandini
2. Ranuccio II Farnese, Duke of Parma
10. Cosimo II de' Medici, Grand Duke of Tuscany
5. Margherita de' Medici
11. Archduchess Maria Maddalena of Austria
1. Antonio Farnese, Duke of Parma
12. Alfonso III d'Este, Duke of Modena
6. Francesco I d'Este, Duke of Modena
13. Isabella of Savoy
3. Maria d'Este
14. Ranuccio I Farnese, Duke of Parma (= 8)
7. Maria Caterina Farnese
15. Margherita Aldobrandini (= 9)

Antonio Farnese House of Farnese Born: 29 November 1679 Died: 26 February 1731
Regnal titles
Preceded by Francesco Farnese	Duke of Parma and Piacenza; 1727–1731	Succeeded by Charles I
Religious titles
Preceded by Francesco Farnese	Grand Master of the Sacred Military Constantinian Order of Saint George; 1727–1731	Succeeded by Charles of Spain
