= Isabella d'Este, Duchess of Parma =

Duchess of Parma and Piacenza from 1664 to 1666

Isabella d'Este
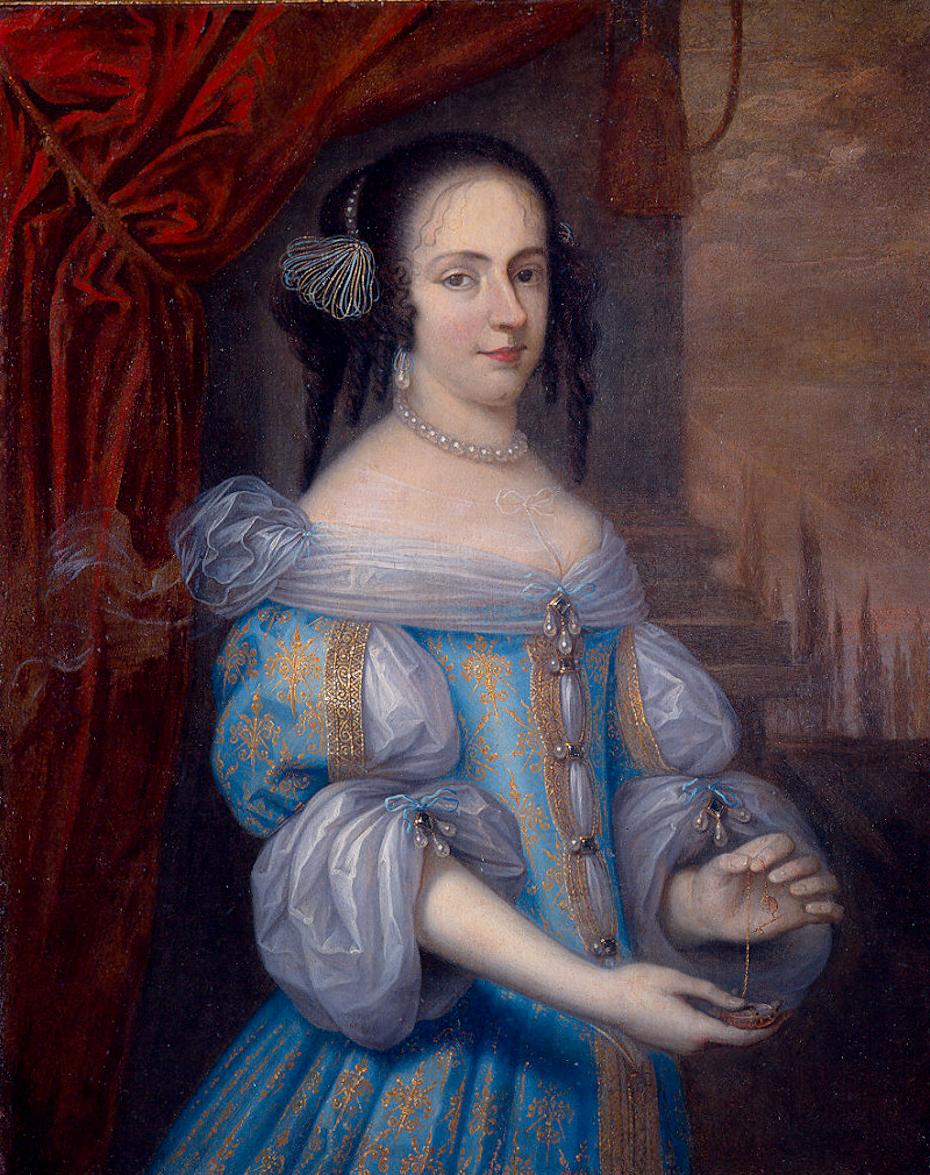
- Portrait by Frans Denys, c. 1666–70

Duchess consort of Parma and Piacenza
- Tenure: 18 February 1664 – 17 August 1666
- Born: 3 October 1635; Ducal Palace of Modena, Modena
- Died: 21 August 1666 (aged 30); Ducal Palace of Colorno, Parma
- Burial: 23 August 1666; Sanctuary of Santa Maria della Steccata, Parma
- Spouse: Ranuccio II Farnese, Duke of Parma (m. 1664)
- Issue: Margherita Maria, Duchess of Modena; Teresa Farnese; Odoardo, Hereditary Prince of Parma
- House: House of Farnese (by marriage); House of Este (by birth)
- Father: Francesco I d'Este, Duke of Modena
- Mother: Maria Caterina Farnese
- Religion: Roman Catholicism

Isabella d'Este (3 October 1635 – 21 August 1666) was Duchess of Parma, and second wife of Duke Ranuccio II Farnese. She was the paternal grandmother of Elisabetta Farnese, Queen of Spain.

== Princess of Modena ==
Isabella was a daughter of the Duke of Modena Francesco I d'Este and Maria Caterina Farnese, daughter of Ranuccio I Farnese, Duke of Parma. She was the sister of two Dukes of Modena, Alfonso IV d'Este (1634–1662) and Rinaldo (1655–1737).

Isabella's father remarried in 1648 to Isabella's maternal aunt Vittoria Farnese, who, however, died one year after marriage in childbed after giving birth to Isabella's half-sister Vittoria.

Isabella's father would marry a third time and this marriage would prove to have some consequences when it came to arranging Isabella's own marriage.

There were attempts to marry Isabella to the young king Louis XIV of France in 1651- 1654, in order to strengthen the ties between France and Modena which had been weakened after her father had allied with France through the intercession of Cardinal Mazarin. But when he saw that the situation of the Thirty Years' War seemed to be favourable for Spain, her father switched his allegiances from France to Spain.

But this marriage did not materialize due to powerful minister Cardinal Mazarin's opposition to the marriage between Isabella's father Francesco I d'Este, Duke of Modena and Lucrezia Barberini, great-niece of Pope Urban VIII.

The Barberini though once allies, had earned the enmity of Mazarin through a series of complex events. The Barberini's had chosen to back a Spanish candidate Giovanni Battista Pamphilj in the 1644 election of the new pope rather than one of the French candidates Cardinal Bentivoglio and Cardinal Sacchetti favored by France (and Mazarin). Afterwards the new pope turned on the Barberini, and many prominent members of the family had to flee Rome and seek protection in France and were aided by Mazarin.

In 1652, however the Barberinis again ingratiated themselves into the good graces of the Pope strengthened by the marriage of Matteo Barberini to the pope's niece Olimpia Giustiniani followed already mentioned marriage of the duke of Modena to Lucrezia Barberini. All of this Mazarin saw as a betrayal and ingratitude from the Barberinis :particularly as the Pope had planned a conspiracy to oust Mazarin from power.

This rift would only be healed with the marriage of Mazarin's niece, Laura Martinozzi and Isabella's brother Alfonso in 1655.

Later focus was on arranging a match for Isabella with one of the German princes who were allied with France in the League of the Rhine.

== Duchess of Parma ==
Isabella married Ranuccio II Farnese, Duke of Parma, in 1663, after the death of his first wife, Marguerite Yolande of Savoy. The couple only met on 18 February 1664, when Isabella arrived in Parma. For this occasion, a grandiose celebration and musical spectacles were organised.

The birth of her son, Odoardo, proved fatal to Isabella, who died of complications nine days later on 21 August, at Colorno. She was buried at the Sanctuary of Santa Maria della Steccata in the city of Parma on the 23 August. Her husband remarried in October 1668 to her sister Maria d'Este. By her he had a further seven children as well as the last two Farnese Dukes of Parma.

== Issue ==
Isabella and Ranuccio had:

- Margherita Maria Farnese (24 November 1664 – 17 June 1718), married 1692 Francesco II d'Este, Duke of Modena.
- Teresa Farnese (1665–1702), benedictine nun in Sant' Alessandro Monastery of Parma.
- Odoardo Farnese, Hereditary Prince of Parma (12 August 1666 – 1693), heir to the Duchy of Parma and Piacenza, but who died before his father. He married Countess Palatine Dorothea Sophie of Neuburg.

== Sources ==
- Castiglione, Caroline (2005). Patrons and Adversaries: Nobles and Villagers in Italian Politics, 1640-1760. Oxford University Press. ISBN 978-0-19-534662-6.
- Condren, John (2024). Louis XIV and the Peace of Europe: French Diplomacy in Northern Italy, 1659 – 1701. Taylor & Francis. ISBN 978-1-040-04166-6.
- Gamrath, Helge (2007). Farnese: Pomp, Power and Politics in Renaissance Italy. L'Erma" di Bretschneider.
- López, Rocío Martínez (2021). "Consequences of the Dynastic Crises of the Seventeenth Century in the Matrimonial Market and Their Influence in the European International Policy: The Case of Maria Anna of Neuburg (1667-1740)". In Santaliestra, Laura Oliván; Anderson, Roberta; Suner, Suna (eds.). Gender and Diplomacy: Women and Men in European Embassies from the 15th to the 18th Century. Hollitzer Wissenschaftsverlag.
- Lucca, Valeria De (2020). The Politics of Princely Entertainment: Music and Spectacle in the Lives of Lorenzo Onofrio and Maria Mancini Colonna (1659-1689). Oxford University Press. ISBN 978-0-19-063113-0.
