= Eleonora d'Este =

Eleonora d'Este may refer to:

- Eleonora d'Este (1515–1575), daughter of Alfonso I d'Este and Lucrezia Borgia, nun, and possibly a composer of religious music
- Eleonora d'Este (1537–1581), daughter of Ercole II d'Este and Renata di Francia
- Eleonora d'Este (1561–1637), daughter of Alfonso d'Este, marquess of Montecchio
- Eleonora d'Este (1595–1661), daughter of Cesare d'Este, duke of Modena
- Leonora or Eleonora d'Este (1639–1640), daughter of Francesco I d'Este, duke of Modena
- Eleonora d'Este (1643–1722), daughter of Francesco I d'Este, duke of Modena
