= Ranuccio II Farnese =

Duke of Parma and Piacenza from 1646 to 1694

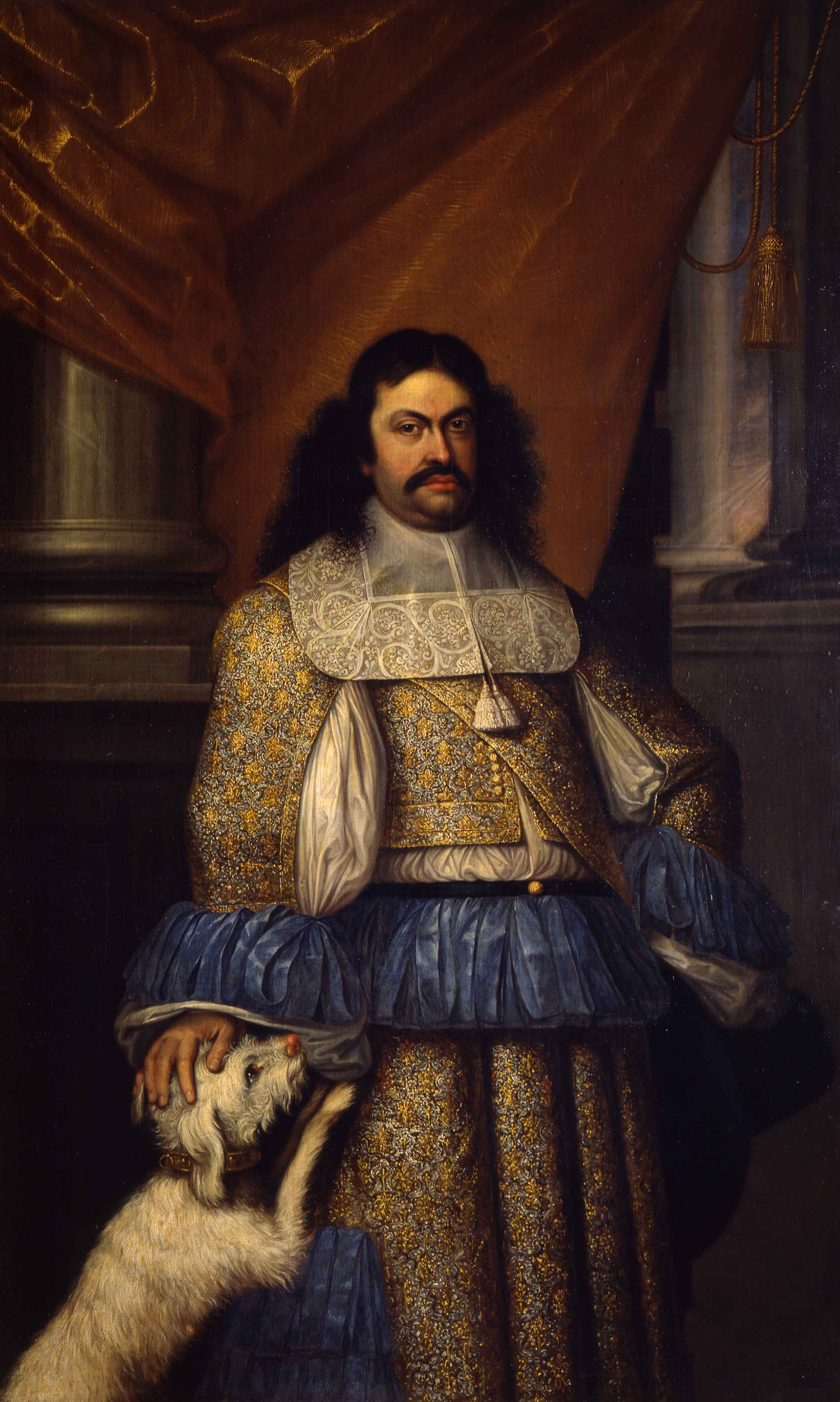
- Portrait of Ranuccio II by Jacob Denys

Duke of Parma and Piacenza
- Reign: 11 September 1646 – 11 December 1694
- Predecessor: Odoardo
- Successor: Francesco
- Regents: 1646–1648: Francesco Maria Farnese; Margherita de' Medici
- Born: 17 September 1630; Parma, Duchy of Parma and Piacenza
- Died: 11 December 1694 (aged 64); Parma, Duchy of Parma and Piacenza
- Burial: Sanctuary of Santa Maria della Steccata
- Spouse: Margaret Yolande of Savoy (m. 1660; died 1663) Isabella d'Este (m. 1664; died 1666) Maria d'Este (m. 1668; died 1684)
- Issue: Margherita Maria, Duchess of Modena; Teresa Farnese; Odoardo, Hereditary Prince of Parma; Isabella Francesca Farnese; Vittoria Farnese; Caterina Farnese; Eleonora Farnese; Francesco, Duke of Parma; Antonio, Duke of Parma
- House: Farnese
- Father: Odoardo Farnese, Duke of Parma
- Mother: Margherita de' Medici
- Religion: Roman Catholicism

Ranuccio II Farnese (17 September 1630 – 11 December 1694) was the sixth Duke of Parma and Piacenza from 1646 until his death nearly 50 years later. He was also the Duke of Castro from 1646 until 1649.

== Biography ==
=== Birth and Succession ===
Ranuccio was the eldest son of Odoardo Farnese, the fifth sovereign duke of Parma, and his Tuscan wife, Margherita de' Medici. After his father's sudden death, Ranuccio succeeded as duke. As he was a minor and had not yet reached his majority, he ruled the first two years of his reign under the regency of his uncle, Francesco Maria Farnese and his mother.

Ranuccio belonged to the House of Farnese, whose duchy were founded by his patrilineal ancestor, Pope Paul III, formerly Alessandro Farnese. The Farnese Dukes had been ruling Parma and Piacenza since Pope Paul's illegitimate son Pier Luigi Farnese was given it as a possession. Pier Luigi was also Duke of Castro, a title he was bestowed upon by his father, after the latter created it from the lands recovered after the death of Ranuccio the Elder, Pier Luigi's younger brother.

=== Conflicts with the Papacy ===
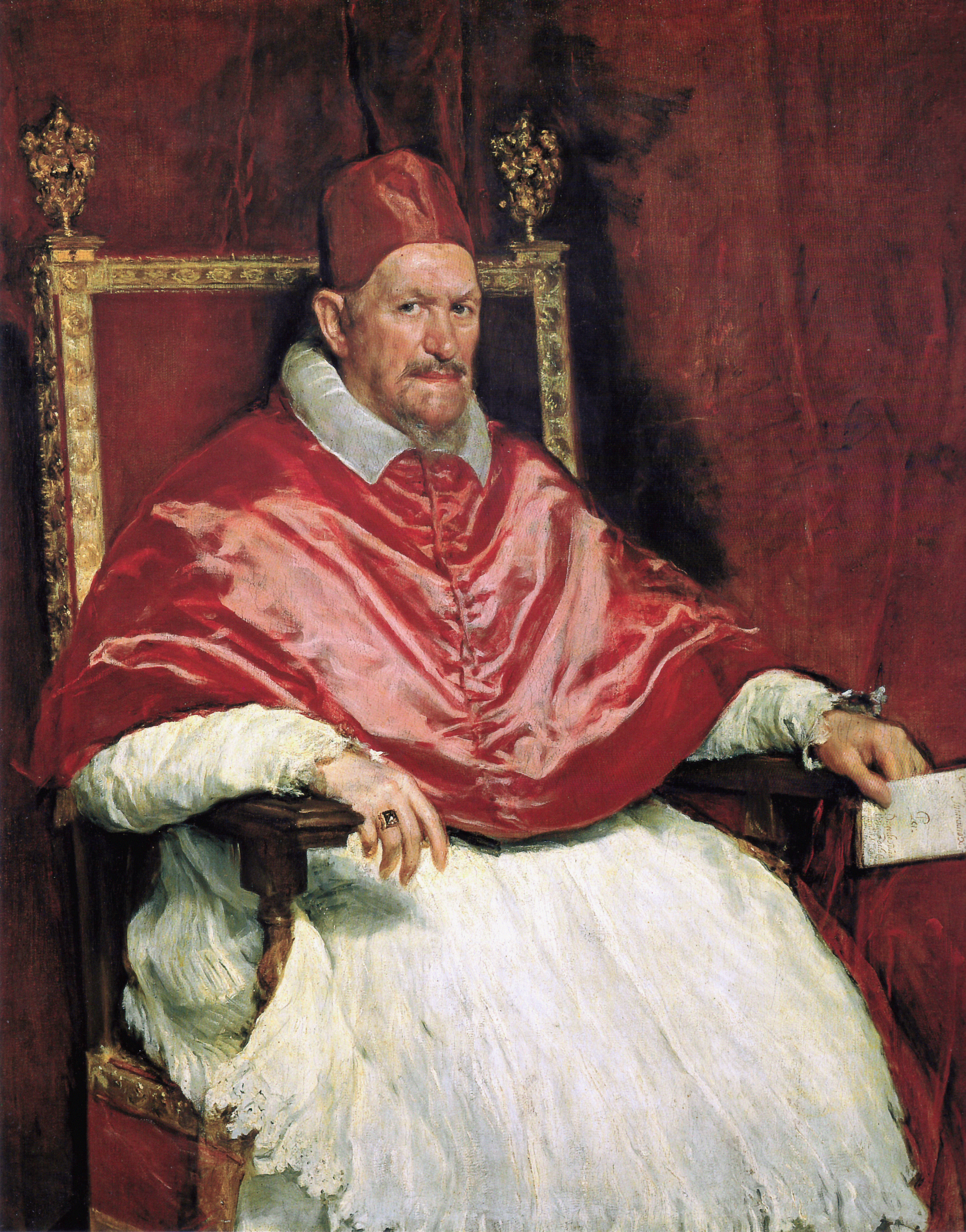
Pope Innocent X, conqueror and destroyer of Castro

During Odoardo's reign the declining Duchy had been involved in the Wars of Castro, over the above-mentioned duchy of Castro, which was a Farnese fief in the Papal States, north of Rome, which the powerful Pope Urban VIII's family, the Barberini, was eager to acquire. They found the excuse when Odoardo was unable to repay his creditors, from whom he had incurred debts. Urban responded to the creditors' plea for help and had Castro occupied. However, the first war ended with Papal defeat.

Ranuccio refused to repay the debts incurred by his father, despite the latter having a signed peace treaty agreeing to do so. He also refused to recognize the new bishop of Castro, appointed by Urban's successor, Innocent X. In 1649, the new bishop, Cardinal Cristoforo Giarda, was murdered on his way to Castro. Innocent accused Ranuccio of the murder and in retaliation, forces loyal to the Pope besieged Castro, and then razed it to the ground. In August of that same year, the Parmense troops had been crushed not far from Bologna, and Ranuccio remained with no means to gain back his fief, despite his attempts to buy it back with money.

In 1672 he bought the principate of Bardi and Compiano from Gianandrea Doria Landi, giving the Duchy its final shape. In the last days of his reign, the Duchy suffered heavily from the presence of Imperial troops, who were fighting in the dispute between Victor Amadeus II of Savoy and France.

== Family ==
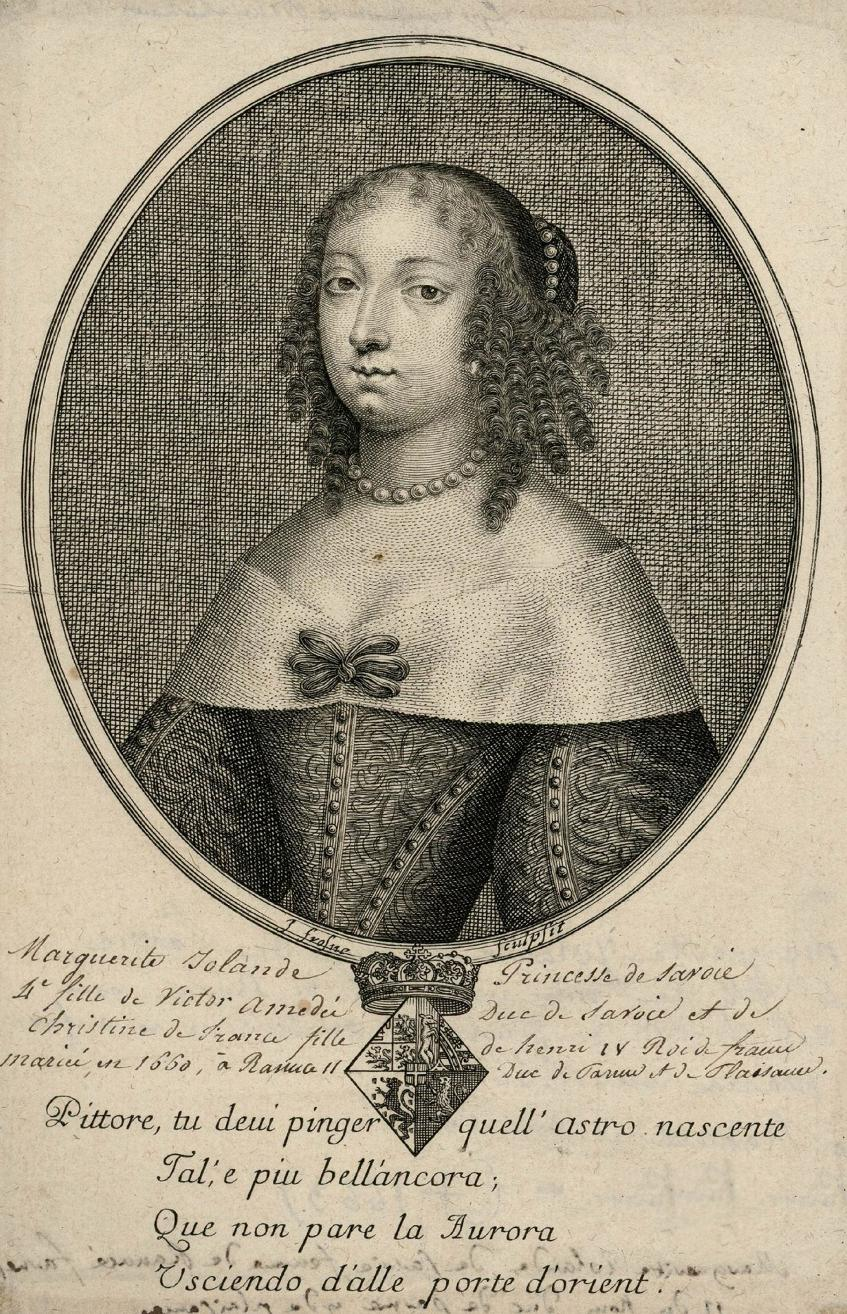
Margaret Yolande, Ranuccio's first wife

Ranuccio II was married three times:

On 29 April 1660, Ranuccio married firstly Marguerite Yolande of Savoy (b. 15 November 1635 – d. 29 April 1663), a daughter of Victor Amadeus I, Duke of Savoy and Christine Marie of France. They had two children:

| Name of child | Lifespan | Marriages and Issue |
|---|---|---|
| unnamed daughter | 14 December 1661 – 14 December 1661 | None |
| unnamed son | 27 April 1663 – 28 April 1663 | None |

On 18 February 1664 Ranuccio married secondly Isabella d'Este of Modena (b. 3 October 1635 – d. 17 August 1666), a daughter of Francesco I d'Este and his cousin. They had three children:

| Name of child | Lifespan | Marriages and Issue |
|---|---|---|
| Margherita Maria Farnese | 24 November 1664 – 17 June 1718 | Francesco II d'Este, Duke of Modena, no issue |
| Teresa Farnese | 10 October 1665 – 9 November 1702 | Never Married; Benedictine nun in Sant’ Alessandro Monastery of Parma |
| Odoardo Farnese, Hereditary Prince of Parma | 12 August 1666 – 6 September 1693 | Countess Palatine Dorothea Sophie of Neuburg, had issue |

On 1 January 1668 he married Maria d'Este of Modena, (b. 8 December 1644 – d. 20 August 1684), his second wife's sister. They had nine children:

| Name of child | Lifespan | Marriages and Issue |
|---|---|---|
| Isabella Francesca Maria Lucia Farnese | 14 December 1668 – 9 July 1718 | Never Married; Benedictine nun in Santa Maria di Campagna Monastery of Piacenza. |
| Vittoria Maria Francesca Farnese | 24 December 1669 – 15 September 1671 | |
| Unnamed son | 24 June 1671 – 28 June 1671 | |
| Vittoria Farnese | 19 November 1672 – 19 November 1672 | |
| Caterina Farnese | 19 November 1672 – 19 November 1672 | |
| Unnamed son | 26 December 1674 – 26 December 1674 | |
| Eleonora Farnese | 1 September 1675 – 3 November 1675 | |
| Francesco Farnese, Duke of Parma | 19 May 1678 – 26 February 1727 | Countess Palatine Dorothea Sophie of Neuburg, no issue |
| Antonio Farnese, Duke of Parma | 29 November 1679 – 20 January 1731 | Enrichetta d'Este, no issue |

== Ancestry ==
Ancestors of Ranuccio II Farnese, Duke of Parma

8. Alessandro Farnese, Duke of Parma
4. Ranuccio I Farnese, Duke of Parma
9. Maria of Portugal
2. Odoardo Farnese, Duke of Parma
10. Giovanni Francesco Aldobrandini
5. Margherita Aldobrandini
11. Olimpia Aldobrandini
1. Ranuccio II Farnese, Duke of Parma
12. Ferdinando I de' Medici, Grand Duke of Tuscany
6. Cosimo II de' Medici, Grand Duke of Tuscany
13. Christina of Lorraine
3. Margherita de' Medici
14. Charles II, Archduke of Austria
7. Maria Magdalena of Austria
15. Maria Anna of Bavaria

== Sources ==
- Gamrath, Helge (2007). Farnese: Pomp, Power and Politics in Renaissance Italy. L'Erma di Bretschneider.
- https://web.archive.org/web/20050204142743/http://www.comune.piacenza.it/english/history/Ifarnese.htm (Retrieved January 23, 2005)
- http://www.italycyberguide.com/History/factspersons/wxyz.htm (Retrieved January 23, 2005)
- http://page.freett.com/mako_vl/name/hausf.html (Retrieved January 23, 2005)

Ranuccio II Farnese House of Farnese Born: 17 September 1630 Died: 11 December 1694
Regnal titles
| Preceded by Odoardo | Duke of Parma; 1646–1694 | Succeeded by Francesco |
| Preceded by Odoardo | Duke of Piacenza; 1646–1694 | Succeeded by Francesco |
