= Alfonso IV d'Este =

Duke of Modena and Reggio from 1658 to 1662

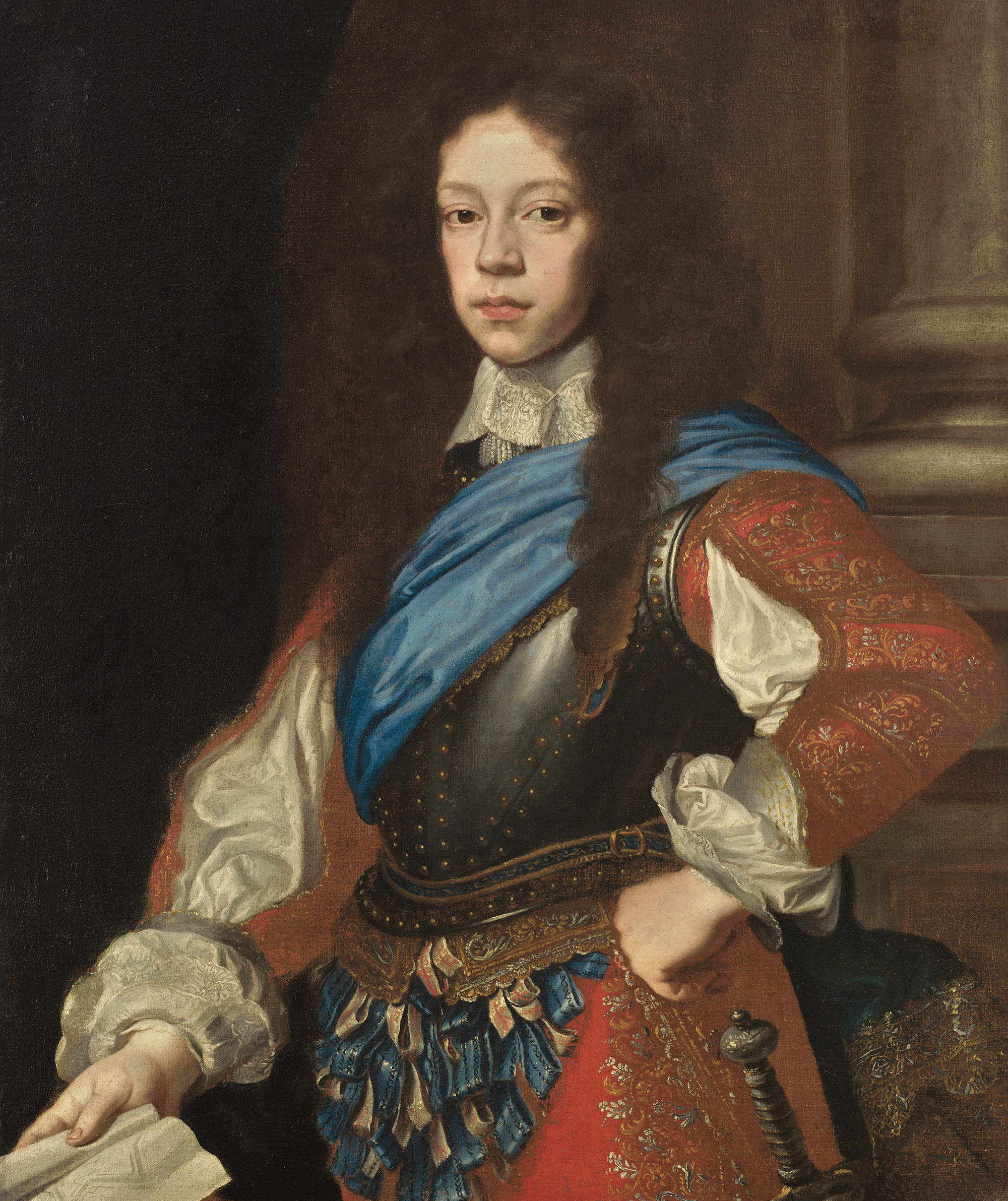
- Portrait by Justus Sustermans

Duke of Modena and Reggio
- Reign: 14 October 1658 – 16 July 1662
- Predecessor: Francesco I d'Este
- Successor: Francesco II d'Este
- Born: 2 February 1634; Ducal Palace, Modena
- Died: 16 July 1662 (aged 28); Ducal Palace, Modena
- Spouse: Laura Martinozzi (m. 1655)
- Issue: Mary, Queen of England, Scotland and Ireland; Francesco II, Duke of Modena
- House: Este
- Father: Francesco I d'Este, Duke of Modena
- Mother: Maria Caterina Farnese
- Religion: Roman Catholicism

Alfonso IV d'Este (2 February 1634 – 16 July 1662) was Duke of Modena and Reggio from 1658 until his death. He was the father of Mary of Modena, consort of James II of England.

Alfonso was born in Modena, the eldest son of Francesco I d'Este, Duke of Modena, and his first wife, Maria Caterina Farnese. He became Duke of Modena and Reggio after his father's death in 1658. Alfonso's health was poor and he suffered from gout and tuberculosis. He died four years into his reign.

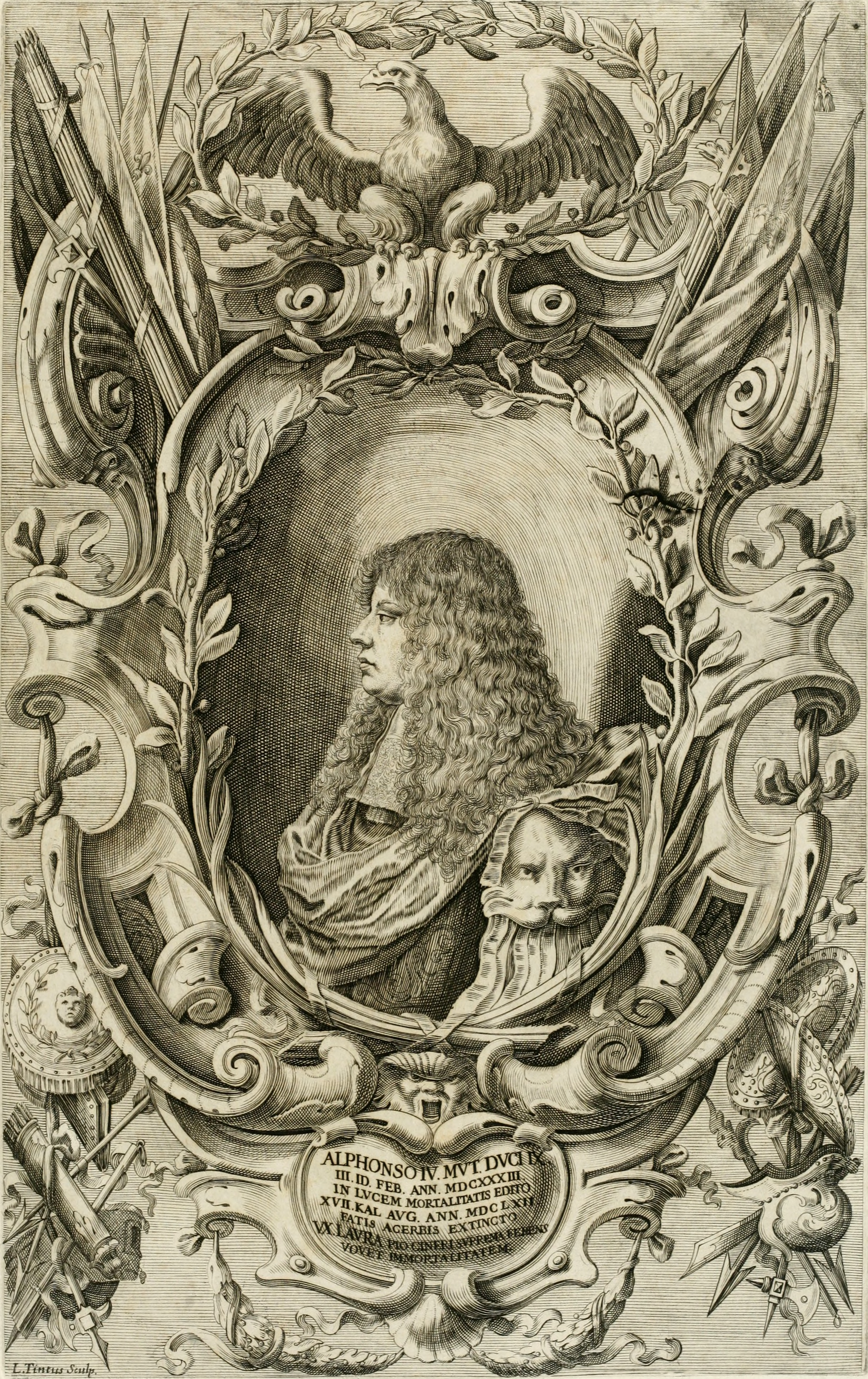
Engraving of Alfonso IV (Lorenzo Tinti)

In 1655, he married Laura Martinozzi, Cardinal Mazarin's niece, thus strengthening his alliance with France. On Laura's sixteenth birthday, 27 May 1655, she was married to the Duke of Modena by proxy at the Palace of Compiègne, with the Count of Soissons standing in the place of the Duke of Modena. They had two children, Maria and Francesco, who went on to become Queen of England and Duke of Modena, respectively.

In 1659 the Franco-Spanish War came to an end and Modena was rewarded with the town of Correggio for supporting France.

He was succeeded by his two-year-old son, under the regency of his widow.

== Ancestry ==
Ancestors of Alfonso IV d'Este

16. Alfonso d'Este
8. Cesare d'Este, Duke of Modena
17. Giulia della Rovere
4. Alfonso III d'Este, Duke of Modena
18. Cosimo I de' Medici, Grand Duke of Tuscany
9. Virginia de' Medici
19. Camilla Martelli
2. Francesco I d'Este, Duke of Modena
20. Emmanuel Philibert, Duke of Savoy
10. Charles Emmanuel I, Duke of Savoy
21. Margaret of France, Duchess of Berry
5. Isabella of Savoy
22. Philip II of Spain
11. Infanta Catherine Michelle of Spain
23. Elisabeth of Valois
1. Alfonso IV d'Este, Duke of Modena
24. Ottavio Farnese, Duke of Parma
12. Alexander Farnese, Duke of Parma
25. Margaret of Austria
6. Ranuccio I Farnese, Duke of Parma
26. Infante Edward, 4th Duke of Guimarães
13. Infanta Maria of Guimarães
27. Isabel of Braganza
3. Maria Caterina Farnese
28. Giorgio Aldobrandini
14. Gianfrancesco Aldobrandini, Prince of Rossano
29. Margherita Dal Corno
7. Margherita Aldobrandini
30. Pietro Aldobrandini
15. Olimpia Aldobrandini, Princess Campinelli
31. Flaminia Ferracci

Alfonso IV d'Este House of Este Born: 2 February 1634 Died: 16 July 1662
Regnal titles
Preceded by Francesco I	Duke of Modena and Reggio; 1658–1662	Succeeded by Francesco II
