= Aurelio Barili =

Italian painter

Aurelio Barili was an Italian painter of the Baroque period, born and active in Parma. In 1588, he painted frescoes in the Parmesan church of San Giovanni Evangelista and the Sanctuary of Santa Maria della Steccata.
