= San Francesco, Fidenza =

Church building in Fidenza, Italy

Coordinates: 44.858436°N 10.053123°E

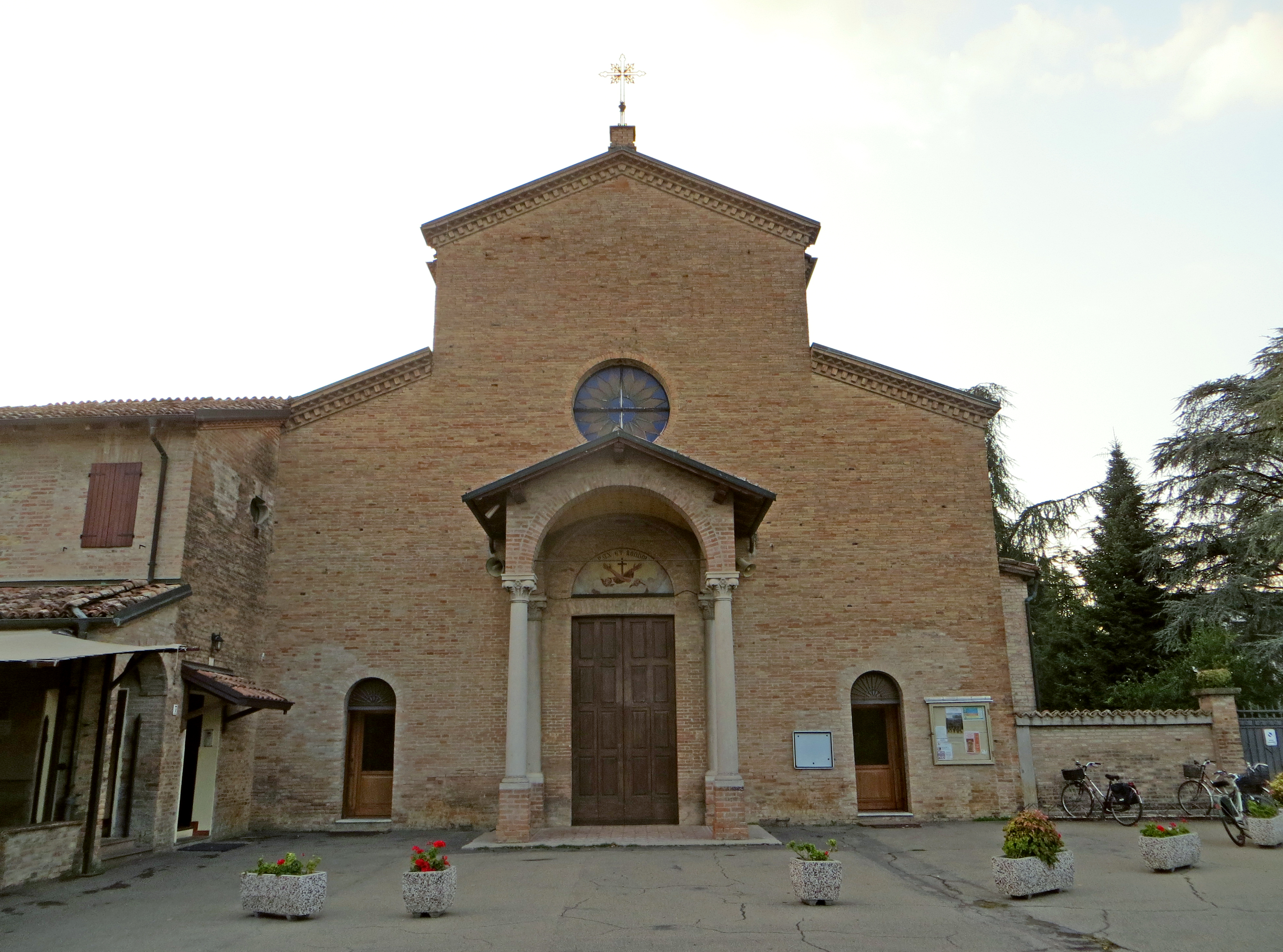
Chiesa del Sacro Cuore (Fidenza) - facciata 2019-10-02.jpg

San Francesco is a Roman Catholic church located on Via San Francesco #7 in Fidenza, Province of Parma, Italy.

== History ==
The Franciscans were late in arriving to Fidenza, and in 1573 were housed in the church of Santa Maria della Rocca, inside the town's castle walls. By two years later, they had built a nearby convent. But conflicts with the soldiers led to them moving in 1582 to a site near what is today the Parco delle Rimembranze, where by 1585 they built a church and convent.

They were expelled from these premises in 1866/67 by the new civil authorities, and found homes in various spots, the Oratorio del Pilastro; then in 1876 in the Oratorio della Crocetta. Here they rebuilt a new convent, and a church was built in 1883-1884 and dedicated to the Sacro Cuore di Gesù. The church was built in brick, in a simple style recalling Lombard-Romanesque. The first chapel on the left has the tombs of Enrichetta d’Este and Leopoldo d’Assia Darmstadt completed by the sculptor Boudard in 1765. A number of other artworks were moved here, including an Enthroned Madonna with Child and Saints by (1718) by Giovanni Battista Tagliasacchi. The Franciscan convent and parish are still active.
