= Odoardo Farnese, Duke of Parma =

Duke of Parma and Piacenza from 1622 to 1646

Odoardo Farnese
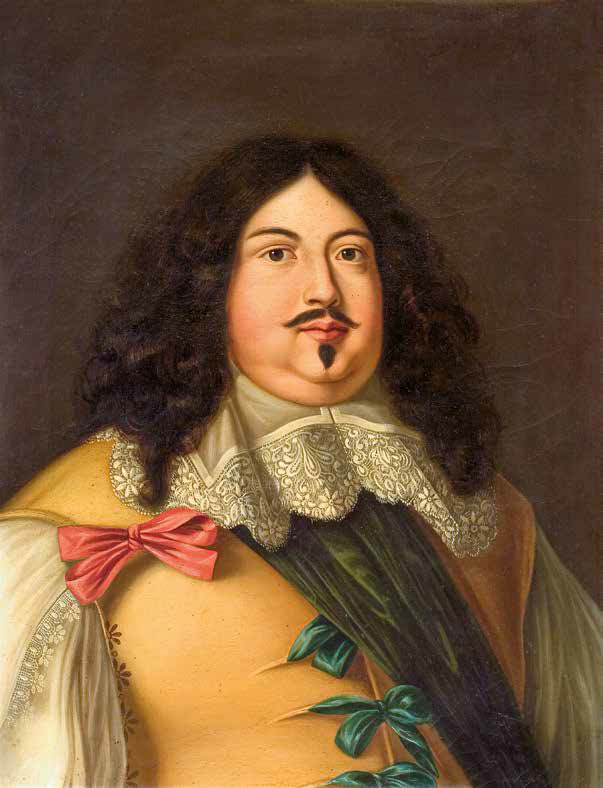
- Portrait by Isacco Gioacchino Levi after a contemporary 17th-century portrait

Duke of Parma and Piacenza
- Reign: 5 March 1622 – 11 September 1646
- Predecessor: Ranuccio I
- Successor: Ranuccio II
- Regent: Odoardo Farnese; Margherita Aldobrandini
- Born: 28 April 1612; Parma, Duchy of Parma and Piacenza
- Died: 11 September 1646 (aged 34); Parma, Duchy of Parma and Piacenza
- Burial: Santa Maria della Steccata
- Spouse: Margherita de' Medici (m. 1628)
- Issue: Caterina Farnese; Ranuccio II, Duke of Parma; Maria Maddalena Farnese; Alessandro Farnese, Governor of the Habsburg Netherlands; Orazio Farnese; Caterina Farnese; Pietro Farnese; Ottavio Farnese
- House: Farnese
- Father: Ranuccio I Farnese
- Mother: Margherita Aldobrandini
- Religion: Roman Catholicism

Odoardo Farnese (28 April 1612 – 11 September 1646), also known as Odoardo I Farnese to distinguish him from his grandson Odoardo II Farnese, was Duke of Parma, Piacenza, and Castro from 1622 to 1646.

== Biography ==
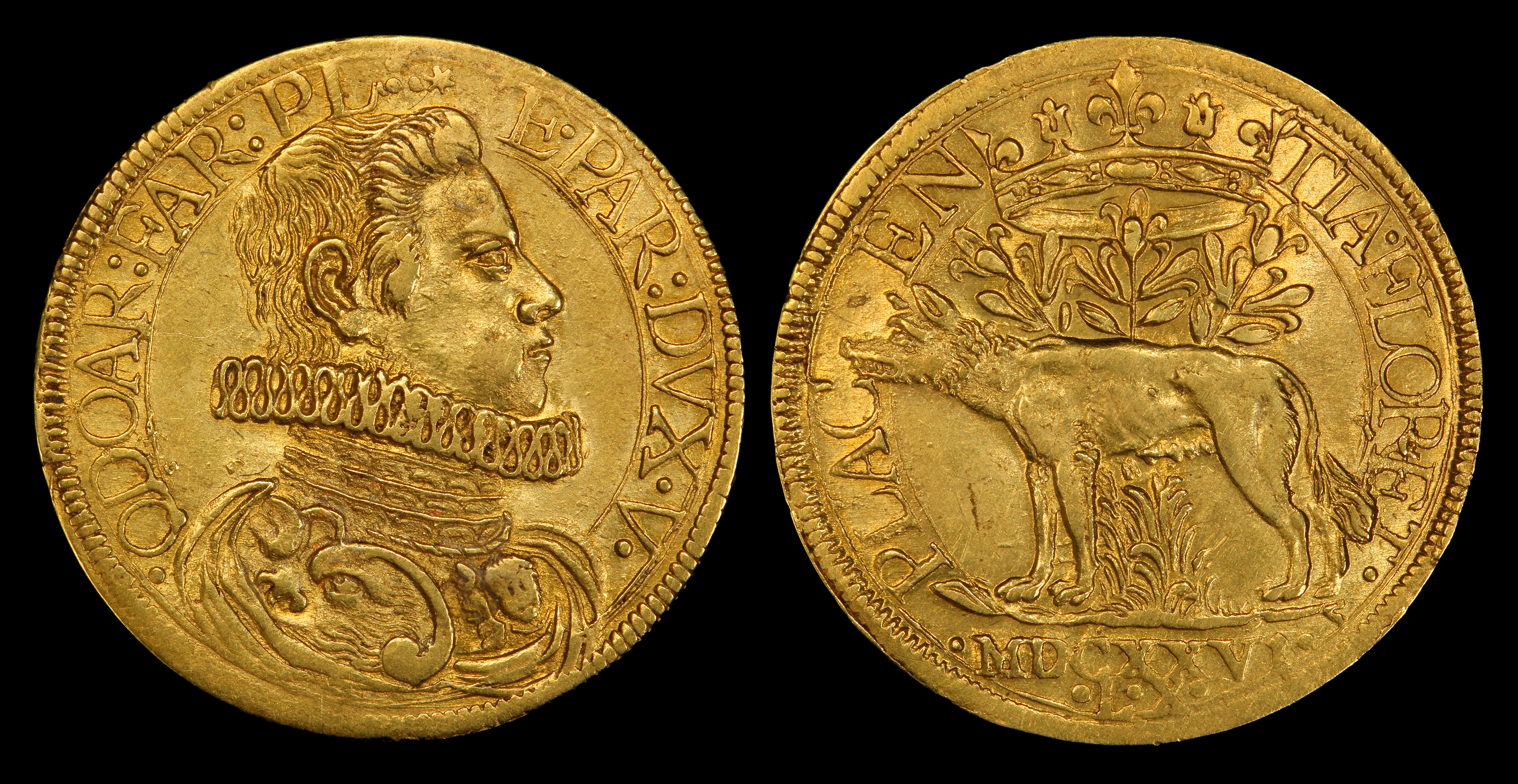
Odoardo Farnese depicted on a gold 2 doppie coin (1626).

Odoardo was the eldest legitimate son of Ranuccio I Farnese and his wife, Margherita Aldobrandini. After Ranuccio's natural son and potential rival, Ottavio, was relegated to a prison, he initially reigned under the regency of his uncle, Odoardo Farnese, and, after the latter's death, under that of his mother, Margherita Aldobrandini.

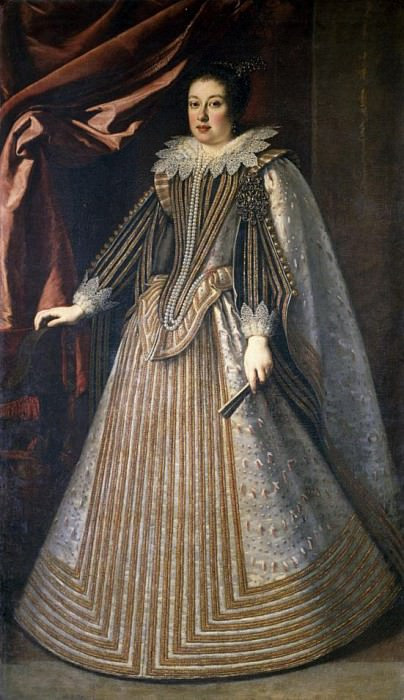
Margherita de' Medici

He came of age in 1628, and in the same year, he married Margherita de' Medici, the Grand Duke of Tuscany Cosimo II de' Medici's daughter. His first notable act as Duke was an alliance with France in 1633, a move designed to counter Spanish predominance in northern Italy and support his territorial ambitions. He also asked for loans to improve the army, but his first campaigns were ineffective: Piacenza was occupied by Spanish troops, and Francesco I d'Este defeated his army. Spanish troops overran the duchy and devastated the countryside, but did not attempt to lay siege to the cities. In the absence of French assistance, Odoardo was convinced by Pope Urban VIII to sign a treaty of peace with Spain in 1637.

His aggressive rule of Castro, a Farnese fief in the Papal States north of Rome, which the Barberini (Pope Urban's family) were eager to acquire, caused Odoardo to be excommunicated in 1641. Instead of reconciliation, he sought alliances with Venice, Florence, and the Duchy of Modena, and invaded northern Lazio with 7,000 troops. His army, composed mostly of cavalry, was unable to recapture Castro by siege. Although the Farnese fleet was destroyed and the Duke often proved recalcitrant, in the peace of 1644, the city of Castro was returned to him, and Odoardo was reconciled with the Roman Catholic Church and readmitted to the Sacraments.

Odoardo died suddenly in Piacenza, his favorite residence, on 11 September 1646.

== Marriage and children ==
Odoardo Farnese married Margherita de Medici (31 May 1612 – 6 February 1679) on 11 October 1628, the daughter of Cosimo II de' Medici, Grand Duke of Tuscany. They had the following children:

- Caterina Farnese (2 October 1629) died at birth.
- Ranuccio II Farnese (1630–1694), married Princess Margaret Yolande of Savoy (1), Isabella d'Este (2), Maria d'Este
- Maria Maddalena Farnese (c. 1633/1638–1693)
- Alessandro Farnese (10 January 1635 – 18 February 1689), Governor of the Habsburg Netherlands from 1678 to 1682
- Orazio Farnese (24 January 1636 – 2 November 1656)
- Caterina Farnese (3 September 1637 – 24 April 1684), Carmelitan nun
- Pietro Farnese (4 April 1639 – 4 March 1677)
- Ottavio Farnese (5 January 1641 – 4 August 1641), died in infancy.

== See also ==
- First War of Castro

Odoardo Farnese, Duke of Parma House of Farnese Born: 28 April 1612 Died: 11 September 1646
Regnal titles
Preceded by Ranuccio I	Duke of Parma and Piacenza; 1622–1646	Succeeded by Ranuccio II
