= Magalotti =

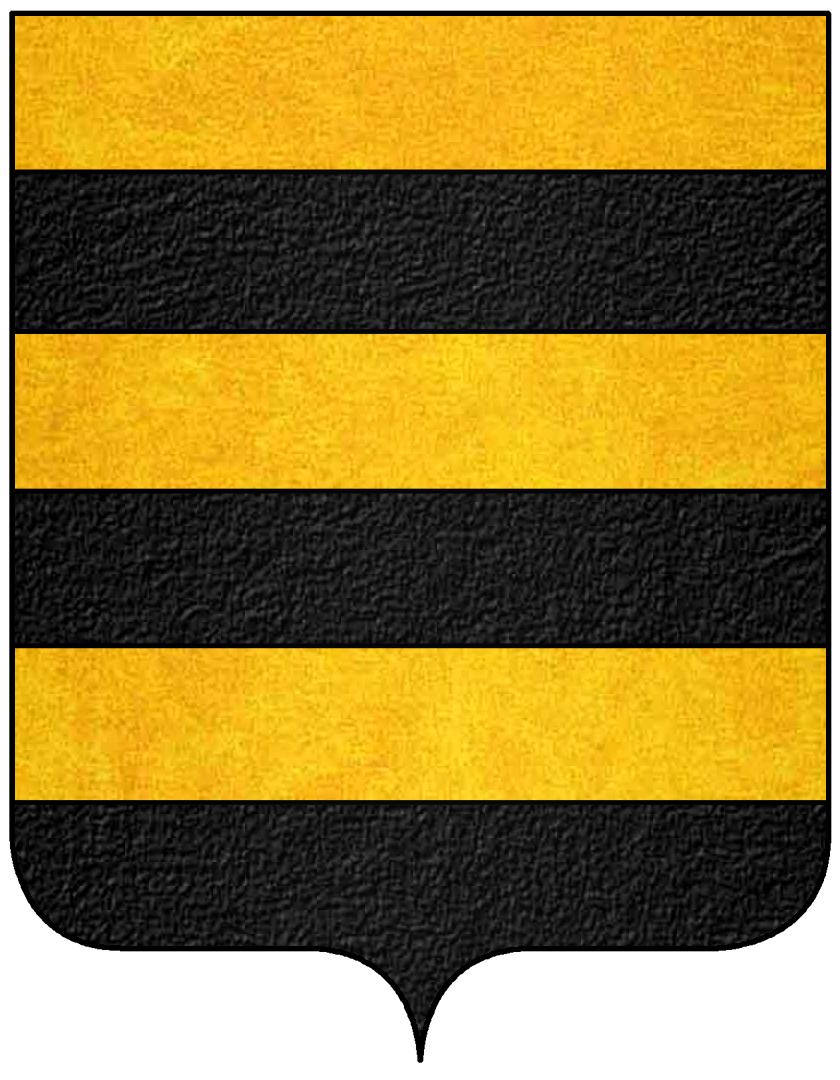
Coat of arms of Magalotti family

The Magalotti family is an old Italian noble family originally from Florence, whose members often played important ecclesiastical role in the history of Vatican and Roman Catholic Church.

== Notable members ==
- Annibale Magalotti (died 1551), Italian Roman Catholic bishop
- Gregorio Magalotti (died 1537), Italian Roman Catholic bishop
- Lorenzo Magalotti (1637–1712), Italian philosopher, author, diplomat and poet
- Lorenzo Magalotti (cardinal) (1584–1637), Italian Roman Catholic cardinal
