= Eleonora d'Este (1643–1722) =

Italian princess and saint

Venerable Maria Francesca of the Holy Spirit OCD

Virgin
- Born: 2 January 1643; Modena, Italy
- Died: 24 February 1722 (aged 79); Modena, Italy

Eleonora d'Este, religious name Maria Francesca dello Spirito Santo, (2 January 1643, Mantua – 24 February 1722, Modena) was an Italian princess and later a Discalced Carmelite.

== Biography ==
D'Este was the daughter of Francesco I d'Este, Duke of Modena and his first wife Maria Farnese. The couple had had another child called Eleonora in 1639 but she had died aged one.

She grew up in her father's court and became known at a very early age for her religious fervour and works of charity. On 3 May 1674 she entered a Discalced Carmelite convent, and took the religious name Maria Francesca dello Spirito Santo. She was frequently put in charge of the convent and was also entrusted with founding a convent in Reggio Emilia, which opened in 1689 and remained until 1798. She became so popular that she also became a spiritual director to several noblewomen. She died in 1722 with the odour of sanctity.
