= Maria Caterina Farnese =

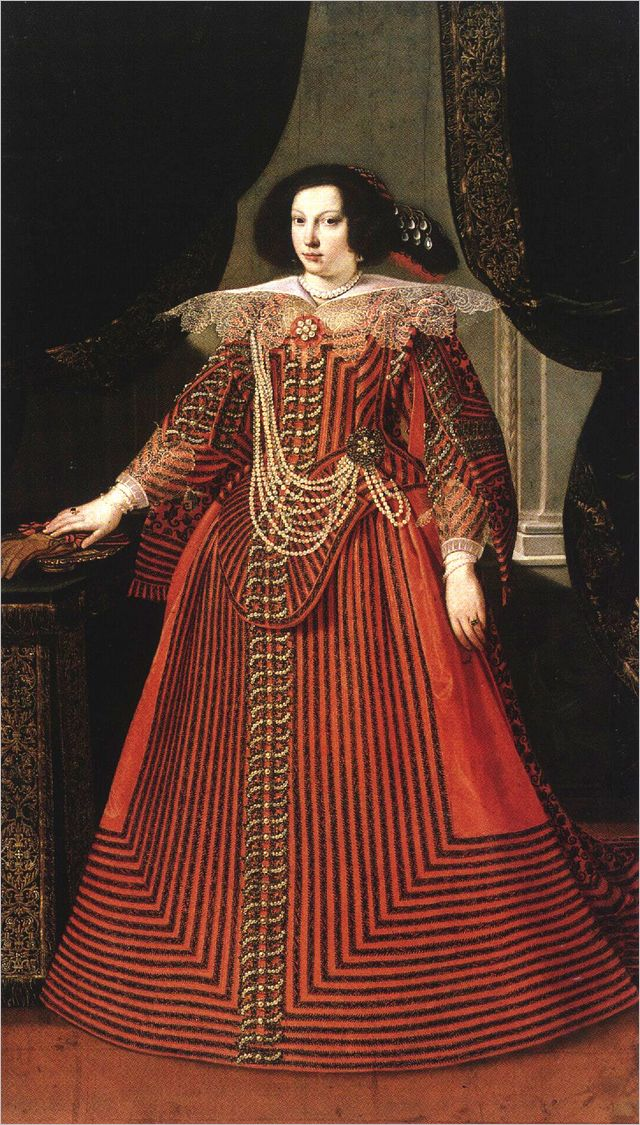

Duchess consort of Modena and Reggio
- Tenure: 11 January 1631 – 15 August 1646
- Born: 18 February 1615; Parma, Duchy of Parma and Piacenza
- Died: 25 July 1646 (aged 31); Ducal Palace of Sassuolo, Modena, Duchy of Modena
- Spouse: Francesco I d'Este, Duke of Modena
- Issue Detail: Alfonso IV, Duke of Modena; Isabella, Duchess of Parma; Eleonora d'Este; Maria, Duchess of Parma
Names
- Maria Caterina Farnese
- House: Farnese
- Father: Ranuccio I Farnese, Duke of Parma
- Mother: Margherita Aldobrandini

Maria Caterina Farnese (18 February 1615 – 15 August 1646) was a member of the Ducal House of Farnese. She was Duchess of Modena as the first wife of Francesco I d'Este, Duke of Modena. In some sources she is known simply as Maria Farnese.

== Biography ==
Maria Caterina was born in Parma to Ranuccio I Farnese, Duke of Parma and his wife, Donna Margherita Aldobrandini. Her mother was Margherita Aldobrandini, daughter of Gianfrancesco and Olimpia Aldobrandini.

Maria was engaged to Francesco I d'Este, Duke of Modena, son of Alfonso III d'Este, Duke of Modena and Princess Isabella of Savoy. She married Francesco on 11 January 1631 in Parma.

Maria died 15 August 1646, having given birth to a son. She died at the Ducal Palace of Sassuolo outside Modena, the summer residence of the Dukes of Modena.

== Issue ==
Maria and Francesco had:

1. Alfonso d'Este, Hereditary Prince of Modena (1632) died in infancy.
2. Alfonso IV d'Este, Duke of Modena (2 February 1634 – 16 July 1662) married Laura Martinozzi and had issue.
3. Isabella d'Este (3 October 1635 – 21 August 1666) married Ranuccio II Farnese, Duke of Parma and had issue.
4. Eleonora d'Este (1639–1640) died in infancy.
5. Tedaldo d'Este (1640–1643) died in infancy.
6. Almerigo d'Este (8 May 1641 – 14 November 1660) died unmarried.
7. Eleonora d'Este (1643 – 24 February 1722) died unmarried.
8. Maria d'Este (8 December 1644 – 20 August 1684) married Ranuccio II Farnese, Duke of Parma and had issue.
9. Tedaldo d'Este (1646) died in infancy.

== Sources ==
- Gamrath, Helge (2007). Farnese: Pomp, Power and Politics in Renaissance Italy. L'Erma di Bretschneider. ISBN 9788882654269.
- von Harrach, Ernst Adalbert; Keller, Katrin (2010). Die Diarien und Tagzettel des Kardinals Ernst Adalbert von Harrach (1598-1667): Kommentar & Register (in German). Böhlau Verlag Wien. ISBN 9783205784616.
- Ward, A.W.; Prothero, G.W.; Leathes, Stanley, eds. (1934). The Cambridge Modern History. Vol. XIII. Cambridge at the University Press.
- Williams, George L. (2024). Papal Genealogy: The Families and Descendants of the Popes. McFarland. ISBN 9781476632278.
