= Odoardo Farnese, Hereditary Prince of Parma =

Hereditary Prince of Parma (1666–1693)

Odoardo Farnese
- Hereditary Prince of Parma
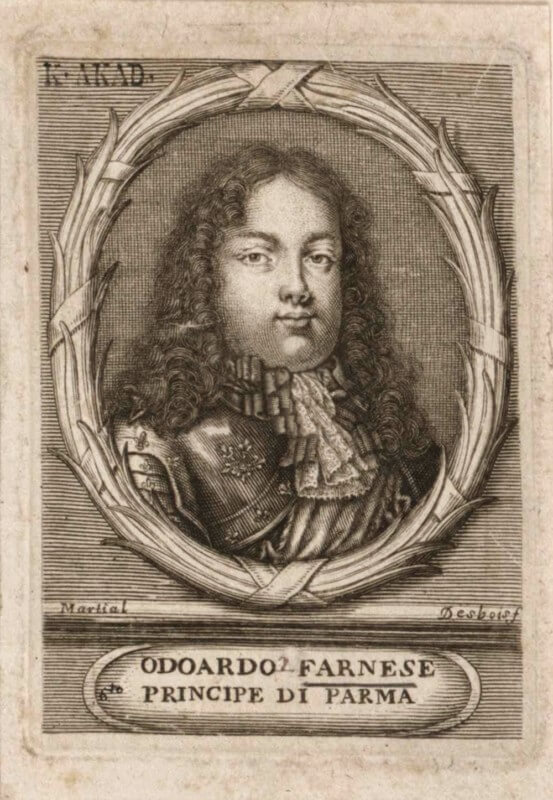
- Born: 12 August 1666; Ducal Palace of Colorno, Parma
- Died: 6 September 1693 (aged 27)
- Burial: Sanctuary of Santa Maria della Steccata, Parma
- Spouse: Dorothea Sophie of Neuburg (m. 1690)
- Issue Detail: Prince Alessandro Ignazio; Elisabeth, Queen of Spain
Names
- Odoardo Farnese
- House: Farnese
- Father: Ranuccio II Farnese, Duke of Parma
- Mother: Isabella d'Este

Odoardo Farnese (12 August 1666 – 6 September 1693) was the eldest son of Duke Ranuccio II Farnese, Duke of Parma and Piacenza. Odoardo was the Hereditary Prince of Parma from his birth until his death.

== Biography ==
Odoardo was born on 21 August 1666 at the Ducal Palace of Colorno in Colorno outside the city of Parma. His father, Duke Ranuccio II Farnese, was the Duke of Parma and of Piacenza. His mother, Isabella d´Este, was the daughter of Francesco I d'Este, Duke of Modena and of Maria Caterina Farnese. He was the third child of his parents, and had two older sisters, Margherita Maria Farnese, future wife of Francesco II d'Este, Duke of Modena, and Teresa Farnese, who never married but became a benedictine nun and abbess of the Saint Alessandro monastery in Parma. Odoardo's mother, Isabella d´Este, died some twelve days after giving birth to him. She had been his father's second wife.

== Marriage and issue ==
Odoardo Farnese married Countess Palatine Dorothea Sophie of Neuburg by proxy on 3 April 1690. The couple were married publicly at the Parma Cathedral on 17 May 1690. The marriage was negotiated by count Fabio Perletti – ambassador and counselor of Ranuccio II. The bride, who was well connected to the royalty of Europe, also brought a very large dowry to the Farnese family.

Dorothea Sophia was the daughter of Philipp Wilhelm, Elector Palatine and Elisabeth Amalie von Hesse-Darmstadt. Three of her older sisters were, at that time, the Holy Roman Empress Consort, the Queen of Portugal and the Queen of Spain.

Odoardo died before his father and therefore never ruled.

== Issue ==
- Alessandro Ignazio Farnese (6 December 1691 – 5 August 1693)
- Elisabeth Farnese (25 October 1692 – 11 July 1766) married King Philip V of Spain and had issue.

== Sources ==
- Gamrath, Helge (2007). Farnese: Pomp, Power and Politics in Renaissance Italy. L'Erma di Bretschneider.
- Samper, Maria de los Angeles Perez (2016). "A Queen between Three Worlds: Italy, Spain, and France". In Palos, Joan-Lluis; Sanchez, Magdalena S. (eds.). Early Modern Dynastic Marriages and Cultural Transfer. Routledge.
