= Countess Palatine Dorothea Sophie of Neuburg =

Duchess of Parma and Piacenza from 1696 to 1727

Dorothea Sophie of Neuburg
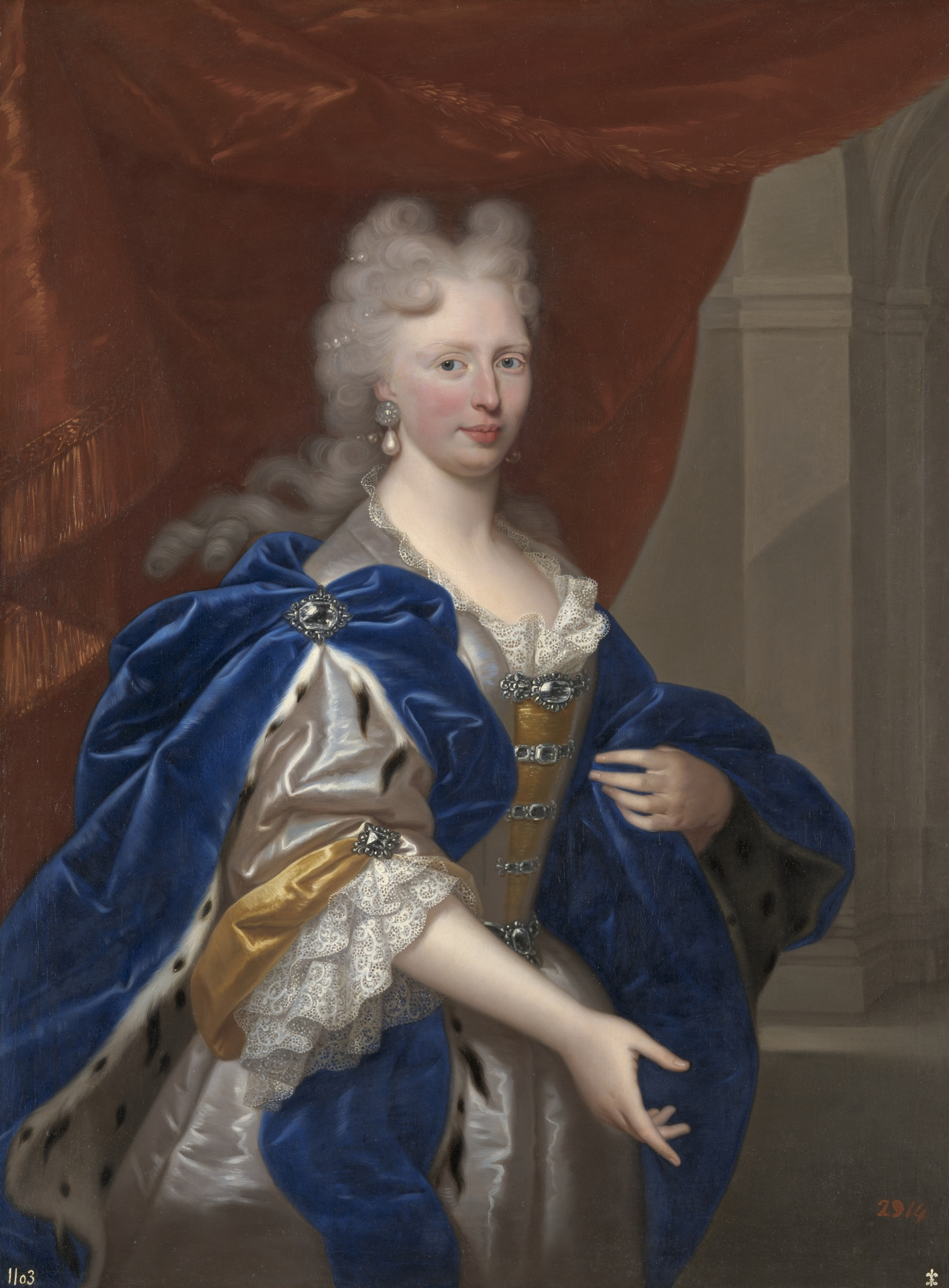
- Dorothea Sophie, circa 1715

Duchess consort of Parma and Piacenza
- Tenure: 7 December 1696 – 26 February 1727
- Born: 5 July 1670; Neuburg Palace, Neuburg
- Died: 15 September 1748 (aged 78); Parma, Duchy of Parma and Piacenza
- Burial: Sanctuary of Santa Maria della Steccata
- Spouses: Odoardo, Hereditary Prince of Parma (m. 1690; died 1693) Francesco, Duke of Parma (m. 1696; died 1727)
- Issue Detail: Prince Alessandro Ignazio; Elisabeth, Queen of Spain
- House: Wittelsbach
- Father: Philip William, Elector Palatine
- Mother: Elisabeth Amalie of Hesse-Darmstadt

Dorothea Sophie of Neuburg (5 July 1670 – 15 September 1748) was Duchess of Parma from 1696 to 1727 by marriage to Francesco, Duke of Parma. She served as Regent of the Duchy of Parma for her grandson Charles I, Duke of Parma between 1731 and 1735.

== Early life ==
Born at the Neuburg Palace, Palatinate-Neuburg, as the fourteenth of seventeen children and the sixth daughter of the Elector Palatine, Philip William of Neuburg, and Landgravine Elisabeth Amalie of Hesse-Darmstadt.

On 3 April 1690, she married by proxy Odoardo Farnese, Hereditary Prince of Parma, heir to the throne of the Duchy of Parma and Piacenza. They would eventually marry in-person on 17 May 1690; the festivities for their wedding were the most splendid that had ever taken place in Parma. In their three years of marriage, they had two children, a son who died in infancy and a daughter, Elisabeth, future Queen of Spain.

== Duchess of Parma ==
Her husband died on 6 September 1693, only a month after the death of their son. On 7 December 1696, Dorothea married Odoardo's half-brother, Francesco Farnese, who had become Duke of Parma when his father died in 1694.

This marriage was decided by Francesco himself, because he did not want to give up Dorothea's dowry should she marry someone else. Nevertheless, this marriage remained childless.

Francesco died in 1727 and was succeeded by his only remaining brother Antonio.

== Regent ==
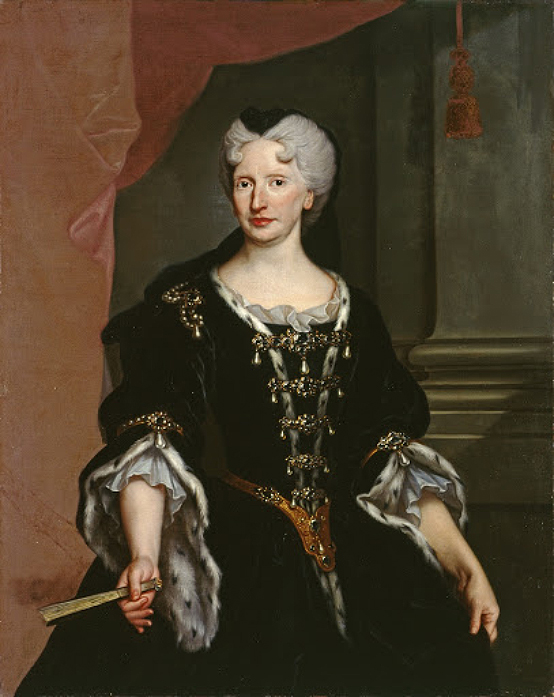
Portrait of Dorothea Sophie as a widow, by Giovanni Maria delle Piane

Antonio died on 20 January 1731. The previous day, he had announced that his wife, Enrichetta d'Este, was pregnant; after his death, a regency council for the potential heir was formed, consisting of Enrichetta, a bishop, the first secretary of state and two gentlemen of the court.

It was decided that, should the child be female, the duchy of Parma would pass to Charles of Spain (then aged 12), eldest of the three sons of Dorothea Sophie's daughter Queen Elisabeth of Spain. Enrichetta was thus invested as regent of Parma, supported by Imperial troops.

Enrichetta's pregnancy was questioned by Elisabeth, though Dorothea Sophie, who wished to defend the right of Charles, as well as by Pope Clement XII, who wished to annex the duchy to the Papal State. However, Enrichetta was supported by Charles VI, Holy Roman Emperor, who opposed Spanish influence in Parma. Of the request of Spain, Enrichetta was examined in May 1731 by doctors confirming her pregnancy. The news was reported around Parma and then around the European courts. Her regency could thus continue, with support by the emperor.

On 22 July however, the Second Treaty of Vienna officially recognised the right of Charles as the duke of Parma and Piacenza, pursuant to the Treaty of London (1718). When Spain demanded that the delivery of Enrichetta should be a public affair, the emperor retracted his support to Enrichetta and discontinued the original plan to arranged a simulated birth.

Queen Elisabeth of Spain convinced her mother to have Enrichetta examined again on 13 September 1731; it was then reported that there was in fact no child, and the House of Farnese was extinct. Charles of Spain was thus recognised as duke, deposing the regency of Enrichetta d'Este. Since Charles was still a minor, Dorothea Sophie (his maternal grandmother) was named regent.

Dorothea ruled as regent until 1735, when the duchy was ceded to Austria after the War of the Polish Succession.

She died in Parma in 1748 and was buried at the Sanctuary of Santa Maria della Steccata.

== Issue ==
Both of her children were with her first husband Odoardo Farnese, Hereditary Duke of Parma.

1. Alessandro Ignazio Farnese (6 December 1691 – 5 August 1693) died in infancy.
2. Elisabeth Farnese (25 October 1692 – 11 July 1766) married Philip V of Spain and had issue.
