= Ranuccio I Farnese =

Duke of Parma and Piacenza from 1592 to 1622

Ranuccio I
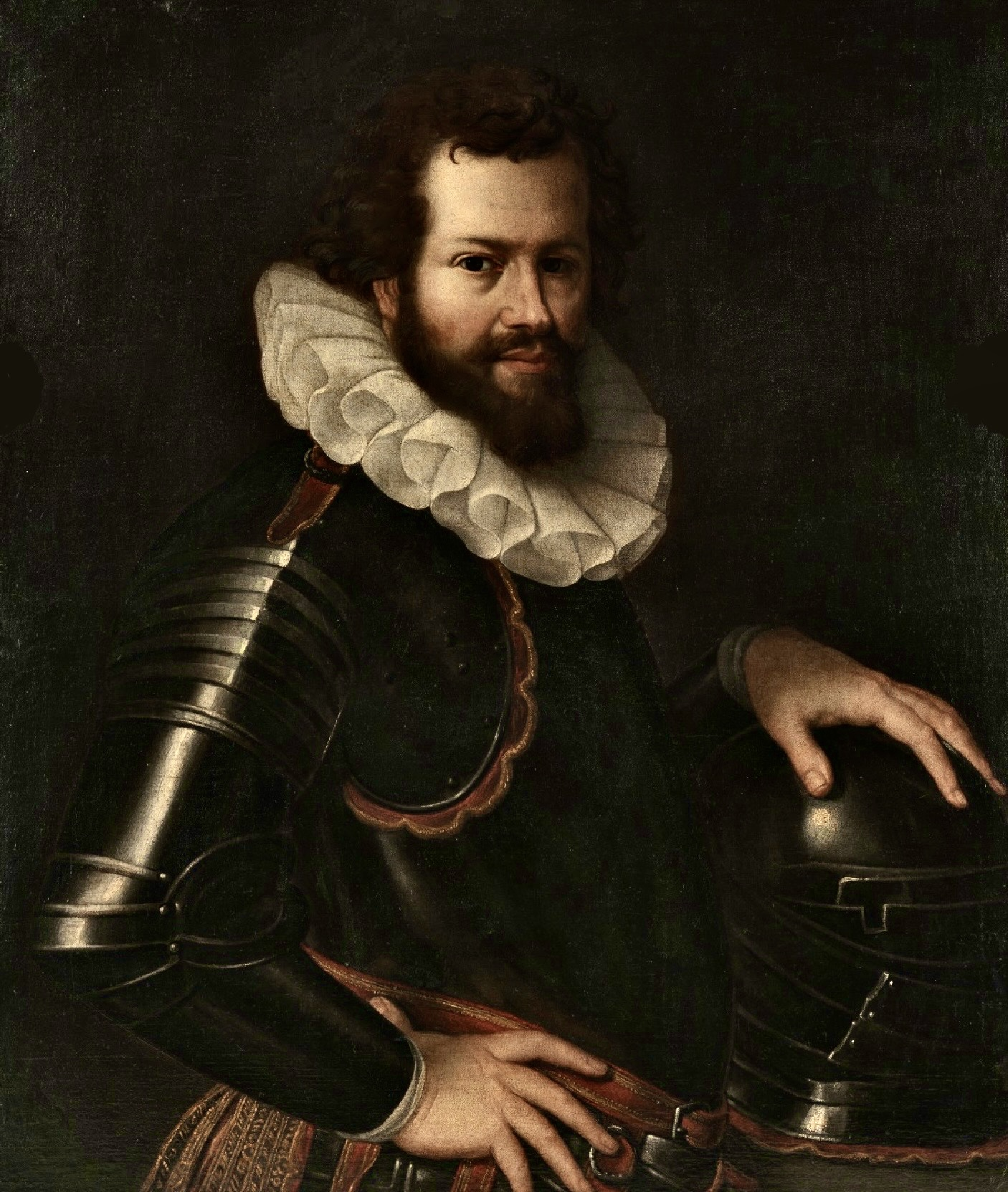
- Portrait by Cesare Aretusi

Duke of Parma and Piacenza
- Reign: 3 December 1592 – 5 March 1622
- Predecessor: Alessandro
- Successor: Odoardo
- Born: 28 March 1569; Parma, Duchy of Parma and Piacenza
- Died: 5 March 1622 (aged 52); Parma, Duchy of Parma and Piacenza
- Burial: Santa Maria della Steccata
- Spouse: Margherita Aldobrandini
- Issue: (illeg.) Prince Ottavio; Odoardo, Duke of Parma; Maria, Duchess of Modena and Reggio; Vittoria, Duchess of Modena; Cardinal Francesco Maria
- House: Farnese
- Father: Alexander Farnese, Duke of Parma
- Mother: Maria of Portugal
- Religion: Roman Catholicism

Ranuccio I Farnese (28 March 1569 – 5 March 1622) reigned as Duke of Parma, Piacenza and Castro from 1592. A firm believer in absolute monarchy, Ranuccio, in 1594, centralised the administration of Parma and Piacenza, thus rescinding the nobles' hitherto vast prerogative.

== Persecution of conspirators ==
Ranuccio was the son of Alexander Farnese, Duke of Parma and Infanta Maria of Portugal. He is best remembered for the "Great Justice" of 1612, which saw the executions of a large number of Piacentine nobles suspected of plotting against him. Claudia Colla his mistress and her mother were accused of using witchcraft to stop him from having offspring, and both were sentenced to death by burning. Because one of the conspirators, Gianfrancesco Sanvitale, falsely implicated several Italian princes, namely Vincenzo Gonzaga, Duke of Mantua and Cesare d'Este, Duke of Modena, in the plot, Vincenzo and Cesare's names appeared on the list of conspirators during formal court proceedings; as a result, Ranuccio's reputation among the rulers of Italy was irreparably damaged because it was evident that he gave credence to Gianfrancesco's obviously false confession. When, consequently, in the early 1620s, Ranuccio was looking for a bride for his younger legitimate son and heir, Odoardo, none of the Italian ruling families were forthcoming with princesses.

== Claim to the Portuguese throne ==
Ranuccio was engaged to Archduchess Catherine Renata of Austria in 1599 but the Archduchess died shortly after and he eventually married Margherita Aldobrandini, niece of Pope Clement VIII a year later. As the son of Maria of Portugal, was considered as a potential king of Portugal when his childless great-uncle King Henry died. The throne, however, passed to Philip II of Spain, whose troops had promptly occupied the country after King Henry's death.

His great-uncle King Henry's death triggered the struggle for the throne of Portugal when Ranuccio was 11 years old. As the son of the late eldest daughter of Duarte, Duke of Guimarães, the only son of King Manuel I whose legitimate descendants survived at that time, Ranuccio was according to the feudal custom, first in line to the throne of Portugal. However his father Alessandro Farnese, Duke of Parma was an ally of the Spanish king, another contender, so Ranuccio's rights were not claimed at the time. Instead, Ranuccio's maternal aunt Catarina, Duchess of Braganza, claimed the throne in an ambitious manner, but failed to become queen.

== Annexation of new areas and patronage of the arts ==
Under Ranuccio I's rule, the dukedom annexed the territories of Colorno, Sala Baganza, and Montechiarugolo. He guided a cultural renewal in the city of Parma, supporting the arts and constructing the 4,500 seat Farnese Theater. Numerous improvements and monuments in Parma were constructed under Ranuccio I at his behest, including a revitalization of the University of Parma and the final expansion of the city walls. Construction of the Palazzo della Pilotta, the court palace of the Farnese family, was completed in 1620.

== Death and succession ==
Ranuccio was succeeded by his son Odoardo, initially under the regency of Ranuccio's brother, Odoardo Farnese.

== Issue ==
Ranuccio married Donna Margherita Aldobrandini, daughter of Don Giovanni Francesco Aldobrandini, Prince of Carpineto and Donna Olimpia Aldobrandini, Princess of Meldola, on 7 May 1600 in Rome, St. Sixtus. The couple had nine children:

- Alessandro Francesco Maria Farnese (8 August 1602), died at birth.
- Maria Farnese (5 September 1603), died at birth.
- Alessandro Farnese (5 September 1610 – 24 July 1630), Hereditary Prince of Parma and Piacenza, deaf and mentally disabled from birth, excluded from the succession.
- Odoardo Farnese, Duke of Parma (28 April 1612 – 11 September 1646), married Margherita de' Medici and had issue.
- Orazio Farnese (7 July 1613 – 28 February 1614), died in infancy.
- Maria Farnese (18 February 1615 – 25 July 1646), married Francesco I d'Este, Duke of Modena
- Maria Farnese (29 April 1618), died at birth.
- Vittoria Farnese (29 April 1618 – 10 Aug 1649), married Francesco I d'Este, Duke of Modena and had issue.
- Francesco Maria Farnese (19 August 1620 – 13 July 1647), Cardinal.

Before his marriage Ranuccio I had a relation with Briseide Ceretoli, who was at that time unmarried; she was the daughter of Ottavio Ceretoli, a colonel who had died in Flanders in the following of Alessandro Farnese, Duke of Parma. The couple had two natural children:

- (illeg.) Ottavio Farnese (1598–1643)
- Isabella Farnese, married Don Giulio Cesare Colonna, Prince of Palestrina and Carbognano (1602-1681)

== Sources ==
- Bellori, Giovanni Pietro (2005). The Lives of the Modern Painters, Sculptors and Architects. Translated by Wohl, Alice Sedgwick. Cambridge University Press.
- Bonfait, Olivier (2001). Geografia del collezionismo: Italia e Francia tra XVI e il XVIII secolo : atti delle giornate di studio dedicate a Giuliano Briganti : Roma, 19-21 settembre 1996 (in Italian). Ecole française de Rome.
- Diffie, Bailey Wallys (1977). Foundations of the Portuguese Empire, 1415-1580. Vol. I. University of Minnesota Press.
- Gamrath, Helge (2007). Farnese: Pomp, Power and Politics in Renaissance Italy. L'Erma di Bretschneider.
- Hanlon, Gregory (2014). The Hero of Italy: Odoardo Farnese, Duke of Parma, his Soldiers, and his subjects in the Thirty Years' War. Oxford University Press. ISBN 9780192586285.
- Williams, George L. (2024). Papal Genealogy: The Families and Descendants of the Popes. McFarland. ISBN 9781476632278.

Ranuccio I Farnese House of Farnese Born: 28 March 1569 Died: 5 March 1622
Regnal titles
Preceded by Alessandro	Duke of Parma, Piacenza and Castro; 1592–1622	Succeeded by Odoardo
