= Francesco I d'Este =

Duke of Modena and Reggio from 1629 to 1658

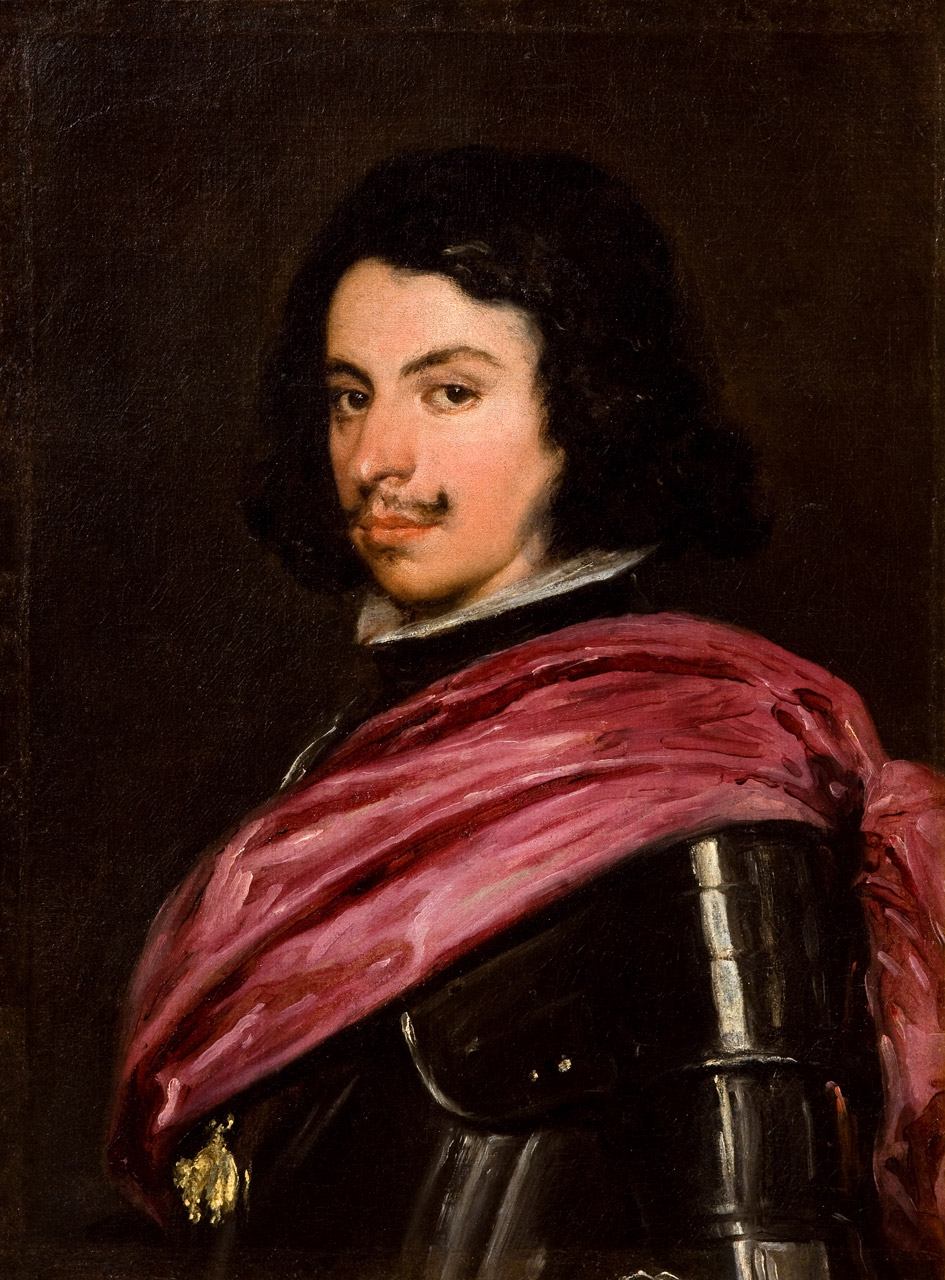
- Portrait of Francesco I d'Este by Diego Velázquez, 1638

Duke of Modena and Reggio
- Reign: 11 July 1629 – 14 October 1658
- Predecessor: Alfonso III d'Este
- Successor: Alfonso IV d'Este
- Born: 6 September 1610; Modena
- Died: 14 October 1658 (aged 48); Santhià, Vercelli, Savoy
- Spouses: Maria Caterina Farnese (m. 1631; died 1646) Vittoria Farnese (m. 1648; died 1649) Lucrezia Barberini (m. 1654)
- Issue: Alfonso, Hereditary Prince of Modena; Alfonso IV, Duke of Modena; Isabella, Duchess of Parma; Eleonora d'Este; Maria, Duchess of Parma; Rinaldo, Duke of Modena
- House: Este
- Father: Alfonso III d'Este, Duke of Modena
- Mother: Isabella of Savoy
- Religion: Roman Catholicism

Francesco I d'Este (6 September 1610 – 14 October 1658) was Duke of Modena and Reggio from 1629 until his death. The eldest son of Alfonso III d'Este, he became reigning duke after his father's abdication.

== Biography ==
Born on 6 September 1610, Francesco was the son of Alfonso III d'Este, Duke of Modena and Isabella of Savoy. He married Maria Caterina Farnese in 1631.

During the First War of Castro, Francesco joined Venice and Florence and sided with the Dukes of Parma against Pope Urban VIII, aiming to reconquer Ferrara. As again no help had come from Spain, Francesco allied with France through the intercession of Cardinal Mazarin. Francesco, with a French army, failed to conquer Cremona in 1646 and 1647, and as the situation of the Thirty Years' War seemed to be favourable for Spain, the Duke sought for an agreement with the latter.

Francesco returned to the service of France by marrying his son and heir Alfonso to Laura Martinozzi, Mazarin's niece. After his wife, Maria's death in 1646, Francesco married her sister Vittoria Farnese who died 1649. His last marriage was to Lucrezia Barberini, daughter of Taddeo Barberini.

After successful resistance to a Spanish invasion from their territories in Milan, he fought alongside France and Savoy, conquering Alessandria and Valenza in 1656–1657 with the help of his son. In 1658 he conquered Mortara but, struck by malaria, died in Santhià soon afterwards.

Although a skillful military commander, Francesco was renowned for his upright character and religious ideals. He enriched Modena with the construction of the Ducal Palace of Modena, the large Teatro della Spelta, the Villa delle Pentetorri, a port on an enlarged Naviglio channel and the restoration of the Cittadella.

=== Francesco in Art ===
Francesco was immortalized by Bernini in a sculpture made around 1650–1651 (Este Gallery and Museum, Modena). It culminates the master sculptor's revolution in portraiture. Much of the freedom and spontaneity of the bust of Cardinal Scipione Borghese is kept, but it is united with a heroic pomp and grandiose movement that portray the ideals of the Baroque age as much as the man. This style of sculpting would later also be seen in the bust of Louis XIV. According to Howard Hibbard, Bernini's portrait bust of Francesco I and the Louis XIV bust "set the standard for monarchical portraiture up to the time of the French Revolution".

== Marriages and issue ==
Francesco and Maria had:

1. Alfonso d'Este, Hereditary Prince of Modena (1632), died in infancy
2. Alfonso IV d'Este, Duke of Modena (2 February 1634 – 16 July 1662), married Laura Martinozzi, parents of Mary of Modena
3. Isabella d'Este (3 October 1635 – 21 August 1666) married Ranuccio II Farnese, Duke of Parma, and had issue
4. Eleonora d'Este (1639–1640), died in infancy
5. Tedaldo d'Este (1640–1643), died in infancy
6. Almerigo d'Este (8 May 1641 – 14 November 1660), died young
7. Eleonora d'Este (2 January 1643 – 24 February 1722), a nun
8. Maria d'Este (8 December 1644 – 20 August 1684), married Ranuccio II Farnese, Duke of Parma, and had issue
9. Tedaldo d'Este (1646), died in infancy

Francesco and Vittoria had:

1. Vittoria d'Este (24 August 1649 – 1656)

Francesco and Lucrezia had:

1. Rinaldo d'Este, Duke of Modena (26 April 1655 – 26 October 1737), married Duchess Charlotte Felicitas of Brunswick-Lüneburg and had issue

== Sources ==
- Cattini, Marco; Romani, Marzio Achille (2009). "Legami di sangue: relazioni politiche, matrimoni e circolazione della ricchezza nelle casate sovrane dell'Italia centro-settentrionale nei secoli XV-XVIII (ricerche in corso)". In Cavaciocchi, Simonetta (ed.). La famiglia nell’economia europea, secoli XIII-XVIII = The Economic Role of the Family in the European Economy from the 13th to the 18th Centuries (in Italian). Firenze University Press. pp. 47–68. ISBN 978-88-8453-911-3.
- Externbrink, Sven (2014). "The Thirty Years' War in Italy 1628-1659". In Asbach, Olaf; Schröder, Peter (eds.). The Ashgate Research Companion to the Thirty Years' War. Ashgate Publishing Limited. pp. 177–192. ISBN 9781317041344.
- Hanlon, Gregory (2014). The Hero of Italy: Odoardo Farnese, Duke of Parma, His Soldiers, and His Subjects in the Thirty Years' War. Oxford University Press. ISBN 9780191510908.
- Hibbard, Howard (1965). Bernini. Penguin.
- Pajerski, Fred M. (1981). Marco Uccellini (1610-1680) and His Music. Vol. 1. Doubleday.
- Ward, A.W.; Prothero, G.W.; Leathes, Stanley, eds. (1934). The Cambridge Modern History. Vol. XIII. Cambridge at the University Press.
