= Margherita Aldobrandini =

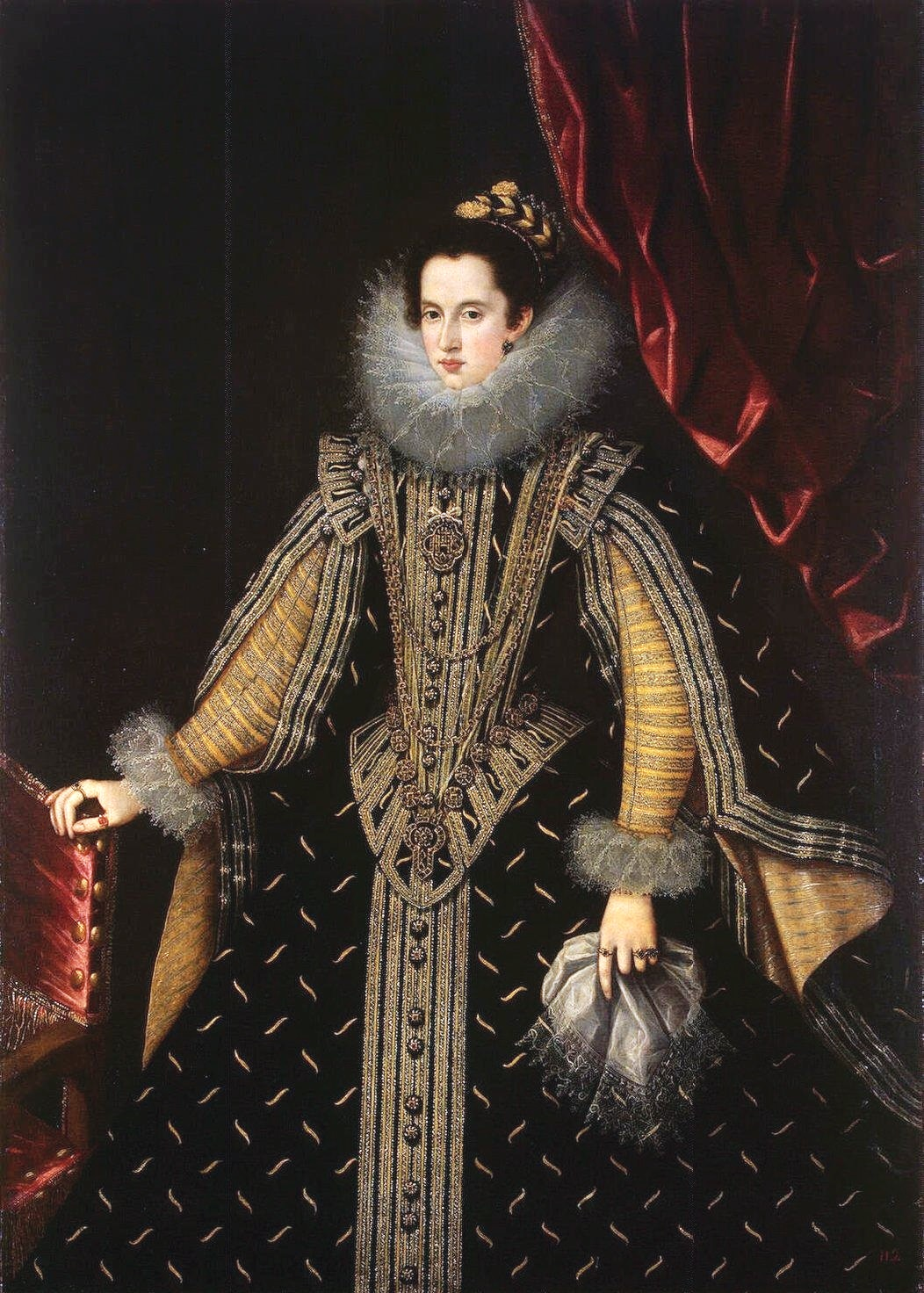
- Portrait by Bartolomé González y Serrano, c. 1610. Currently at Hermitage Museum, Saint Petersburg.

Duchess consort of Parma and Piacenza
- Tenure: 7 May 1600 – 5 March 1622

Regent of Parma and Piacenza
- Regency: 21 February 1626 – 28 April 1628
- Born: 29 March 1588; Capodimonte, Papal States
- Died: 9 August 1646 (aged 58); Parma, Duchy of Parma and Piacenza
- Spouse: Ranuccio I Farnese, Duke of Parma and Piacenza (m. 1600; died 1622)
- Issue: Alessandro Farnese, Hereditary Prince of Parma and Piacenza; Odoardo Farnese, Duke of Parma and Piacenza; Maria Caterina, Duchess of Modena; Vittoria, Duchess of Modena; Cardinal Francesco Maria Farnese
- Noble family: Aldobrandini (by birth); Farnese (by marriage)
- Father: Giovanni Francesco Aldobrandini
- Mother: Olimpia Aldobrandini

Margherita Aldobrandini (29 March 1588 — 9 August 1646), was an Italian noblewoman member of the Aldobrandini family and by marriage Duchess consort of Parma and Piacenza during 1600–1622. She was also Regent of both Duchies during 1626–1628 on behalf of her minor son.

== Life ==
=== Family and early years ===
Born in the castle of Capodimonte in the Duchy of Castro on 29 March 1588, Margherita was the eldest child and daughter of Gianfrancesco Aldobrandini and Olimpia Aldobrandini, (Note: Margherita's parents were distant cousins, both members of the Aldobrandini family: Gianfrancesco was a descendant of Jacopo Aldobrandini (born ca. 1388), Priori di Libertà during 1431–1437, while Olimpia was a descendant of Jacopo's older brother Aldobrandino Aldobrandini (died 1453), also Priori di Libertà in 1417 and Gonfaloniere di Giustizia della Repubblica di Firenze in 1434.) niece of Cardinal Ippolito Aldobrandini, who became Pope Clement VIII in 1592. In 1593, at the invitation of her uncle, the pontiff, Margherita's parents moved to Rome. The Pope wanted to strengthen the position of the Aldobrandini family in the Papal States and provided patronage to his relatives. Margherita's father enjoyed special confidence in the pontiff, who bestowed on him the titles of Count of Sarsina and Meldola (later elevated to the rank of Prince in 1597), and her mother was his favorite niece. The pontiff also patronized the children of the spouses: he elevated their eldest son Salvestro to the rank of Cardinal, and for the eldest daughters Margherita and Elena began to look for husbands of sovereign houses.

As suitors for Margherita, the Pope considered the candidacies of princes from the Houses of Savoy and Medici, and even King Henry IV of France. However, the candidates were not interested in the proposal. From 1598, the Pope began negotiations for the marriage of Margherita with Ranuccio I Farnese, Duke of Parma and Piacenza. This marriage was supposed to stabilize the relationship between the Houses of Aldobrandini and Farnese and lead to a political alliance between the Holy See and the Duchy of Parma. In the course of lengthy and difficult negotiations, the parties came to an agreement on the amount of the bride's dowry, most of which was paid from the treasury of the Papal States. The marriage agreement was signed in Rome with the active participation of Spanish diplomats and Cardinals Pietro Aldobrandini and Odoardo Farnese.

=== Duchess of Parma ===
On 7 May 1600 in Rome, Pope Clement VIII celebrated the marriage between Duke Ranuccio I Farnese and Margherita Aldobrandini. At the request of the Pope, the wedding took place without any special celebrations, but this event in an allegorical form was reflected in the art and literature of that time. The union of a 30-year-old groom and an 11-year-old bride was glorified by contemporary poets in epithals and madrigals. It is believed that the wedding of the Duke and the grand-niece of the Pope inspired the cycle of frescos called The Loves of the Gods, a work of the Bolognese artist Annibale Carracci and his studio, which is located in the west wing of the Palazzo Farnese in Rome. On 4 June, together with her husband, Margherita left Rome for Parma, accompanied by armed guards and a cortege from the Parma nobility. On the way, the newlyweds visited Vittoria Farnese, Duchess consort of Urbino, the paternal aunt of Margherita's husband. On 1 July they arrived in the Duchy of Parma. The young Duchess spent the summer at the Castello di Torrechiara, awaiting the completion of renovations at the Ducal Palace in Parma. In early October, her solemn entry into the capital of the Duchy took place.

The Duchess couldn't get pregnant for a long time; she had several miscarriages and the first two children she gave birth to in the first ten years of her marriage, in 1602 and 1603, only lived for a few hours. Margherita's relatives knew about her gynecological problems before her marriage; in addition, she underwent several operations. The question of the probable infertility of the then bride of the Duke of Parma was also known by his younger brother Cardinal Odoardo Farnese, who, nevertheless, didn't inform the groom. Historians believe that the Cardinal hoped in this way to be the successor of the Ducal throne of Parma after the death of his childless older brother; but in 1605, Duke Ranuccio I legitimized his illegitimate son Ottavio Farnese, whom, much to Margherita's chagrin, he took to the Ducal Palace and began to train and educate him as his heir.

The superstitious Duke Ranuccio I, who believed in the effectiveness of witchcraft, convinced himself that he was the victim of someone's curse. After trying all medical methods, he turned to astrologers and exorcists, began to fast and generously give alms. Finally, he ordered the initiation of an investigation into the witchcraft case, which established that his wife had been damaged by the Duke's former mistresses, the beautiful noblewoman Claudia Colla and her mother Elena, nicknamed "the Roman Woman" (le Romane). The women were convicted and imprisoned in the Rocchetta prison.

In 1610, Margherita finally gave birth a child who survived. The boy, named Alessandro after his paternal grandfather, raised the hopes of the court until it became clear that he was deaf and, as a result, dumb. After numerous unsuccessful attempts to correct his condition, in 1618 Alessandro was officially declared unable to govern the state. The position of Ducal heir went instead to Odoardo, Margherita's second surviving child, born in 1612. By this time the gynecological problems of Margherita had apparently been resolved: between 1613 and 1620 she gave birth to five more children, three of whom survived infancy. According to some researchers, she passed the hereditary obesity to the later representatives of the House of Farnese. To the delight of Margherita, the illegitimate Ottavio Farnese was removed from court. He resented his demotion and was caught participating in a conspiracy against his father, after which he was confined in the Rocchetta prison until his death.

Like most political marriages in the House of Farnese, Margherita's union was unhappy. The interests of the relatives of the Duchess and her husband often overlapped, which led to conflicts between them. The hot-tempered and cruel Duke Ranuccio I did not change his love habits: Margherita had to be patient with the Duke's promiscuous relationships with other women. According to contemporaries, the Duchess had a meek character. She was a pious woman, helped the poor and the sick, and patronized the monks, especially the Theatines, whom in 1629 she helped to settle down at the Church of St. Christina in Parma. Margherita loved art and poetry, patronized the poet Claudio Achillini, whom she helped to take a chair at the University of Parma. Only once during the years of marriage did the Duchess travel with her husband outside Parma: in 1620, they paid an official visit to Piacenza, where they attended the unveiling of the equestrian monuments of the Duke and his father Alessandro Farnese.

=== Regent of Parma ===
Duke Rannucio I died on 5 March 1622. His younger brother, Cardinal Odoardo, acted as Regent of the Duchy of Parma on behalf of his 10-years-old nephew and new Duke Odoardo. The Cardinal's death in February 1626 allowed Margherita, now Dowager Duchess, to become in the new Regent for her son. Her 2-years regency occurred during the Thirty Years' War; she managed to maintain stability in the Duchy, observing neutrality. In the War of the Mantuan Succession she supported Charles Gonzaga, Duke of Nevers, who became in the next Duke of Mantua and Montferrato.

In 1628 Duke Odoardo Farnese attained his majority, and Margherita resigned to her functions as Regent. In October of the same year, the Duke married Margherita de' Medici. Back in 1620, Duke Ranuccio I agreed on the marriage of his heir to Maria Cristina de' Medici, the eldest daughter of Cosimo II de' Medici, Grand Duke of Tuscany, but because of Maria Cristina's health problems (she was born with a deformity and was possibly mentally disabled) in February 1627 was decided that the Grand Duke's second daughter Margherita de' Medici became in the new bride and eventually Duchess consort of Parma.

Little is known of the Dowager Duchess after the end of her regency; the only certainty is that she lived at the court of her son. Margherita Aldobrandini died in Parma on 9 August 1646; her son Duke Odoardo died a few weeks later, on 11 September.

== Issue ==
Margherita and Ranuccio I had nine children:

- Alessandro Francesco Maria Farnese (8 August 1602), Hereditary Prince of Parma and Piacenza, died at birth.
- Maria Farnese (5 September 1603), died at birth.
- Alessandro Farnese (5 September 1610 – 24 July 1630), Hereditary Prince of Parma and Piacenza, deaf and dumb from the birth, excluded from the succession.
- Odoardo Farnese, Duke of Parma (28 April 1612 – 11 September 1646), married Margherita de' Medici and had issue.
- Orazio Farnese (7 July 1613 – 28 February 1614), died in infancy.
- Maria Caterina Farnese (18 February 1615 – 25 July 1646), married Francesco I d'Este, Duke of Modena and had issue.
- Maria Farnese (29 April 1618), died at birth.
- Vittoria Farnese (29 April 1618 – 10 Aug 1649), married Francesco I d'Este, Duke of Modena and had issue.
- Francesco Maria Farnese (19 August 1620 – 13 July 1647), Cardinal.
