= Grand Ducal Crown of Tuscany =

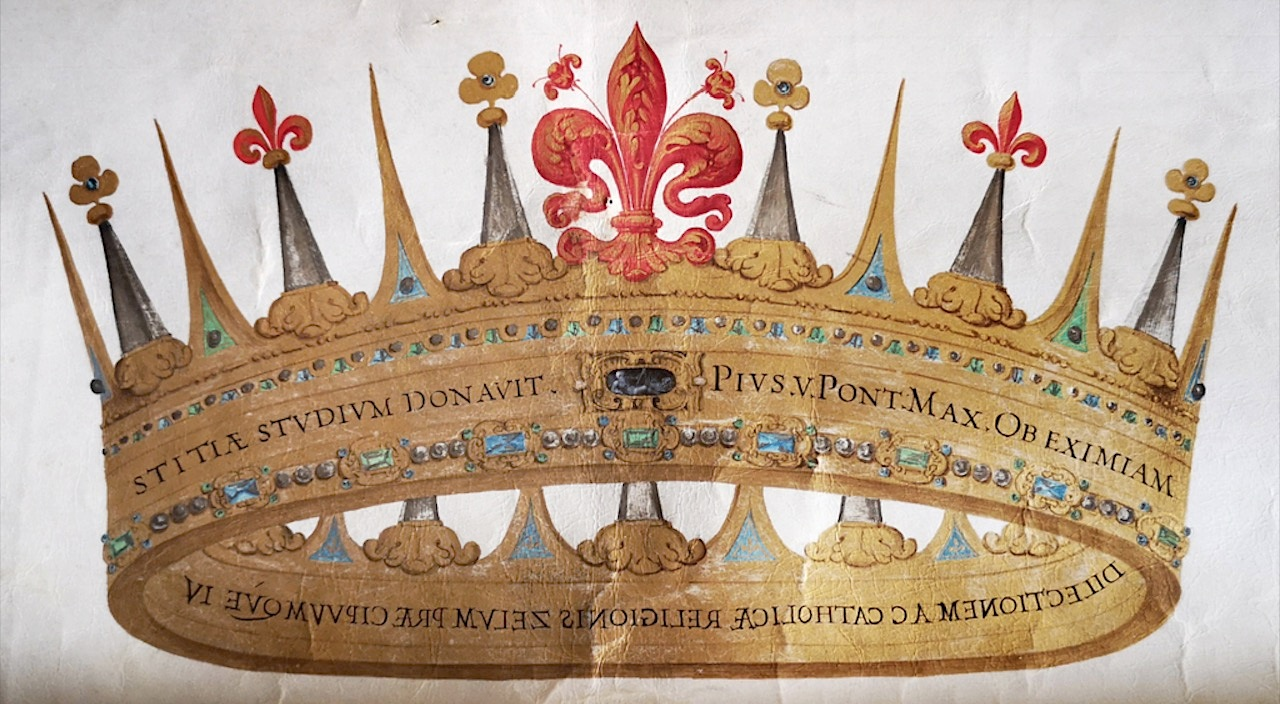
- The depiction of the old crown in Pope Pius V's papal bull

Heraldic depictions

Details
- Country: Italy
- Made: 1570
- Destroyed: XVIII century
- Arches: None
- Material: Gold
- Cap: None
- Notable stones: Pearls, emeralds, cordierite, onyx
- Other elements: Florentine fleurs-de-lis

The Grand Ducal Crown of Tuscany (Italian: corona del Granducato di Toscana) was a ducal crown created by the Medicean Grand Dukes of Tuscany.

== The old crown ==
Cosimo I de' Medici, duke of Florence, sought to achieve a title which removed him from his status as a feudatory of the Holy Roman Emperor and gave him more political independence. Getting nothing from the Emperor, he turned to the Papacy. Already he had attempted to get Paul IV to give him the title of king or archduke with no success. Finally in 1569, after many favours and dealings of differing levels of legitimacy, Pope Pius V released a Papal bull which conferred the style of Altezza Serenissima and the title of Grand Duke, a very rare title that placed the Sovereign of Tuscany above a Duke, but below a Prince.

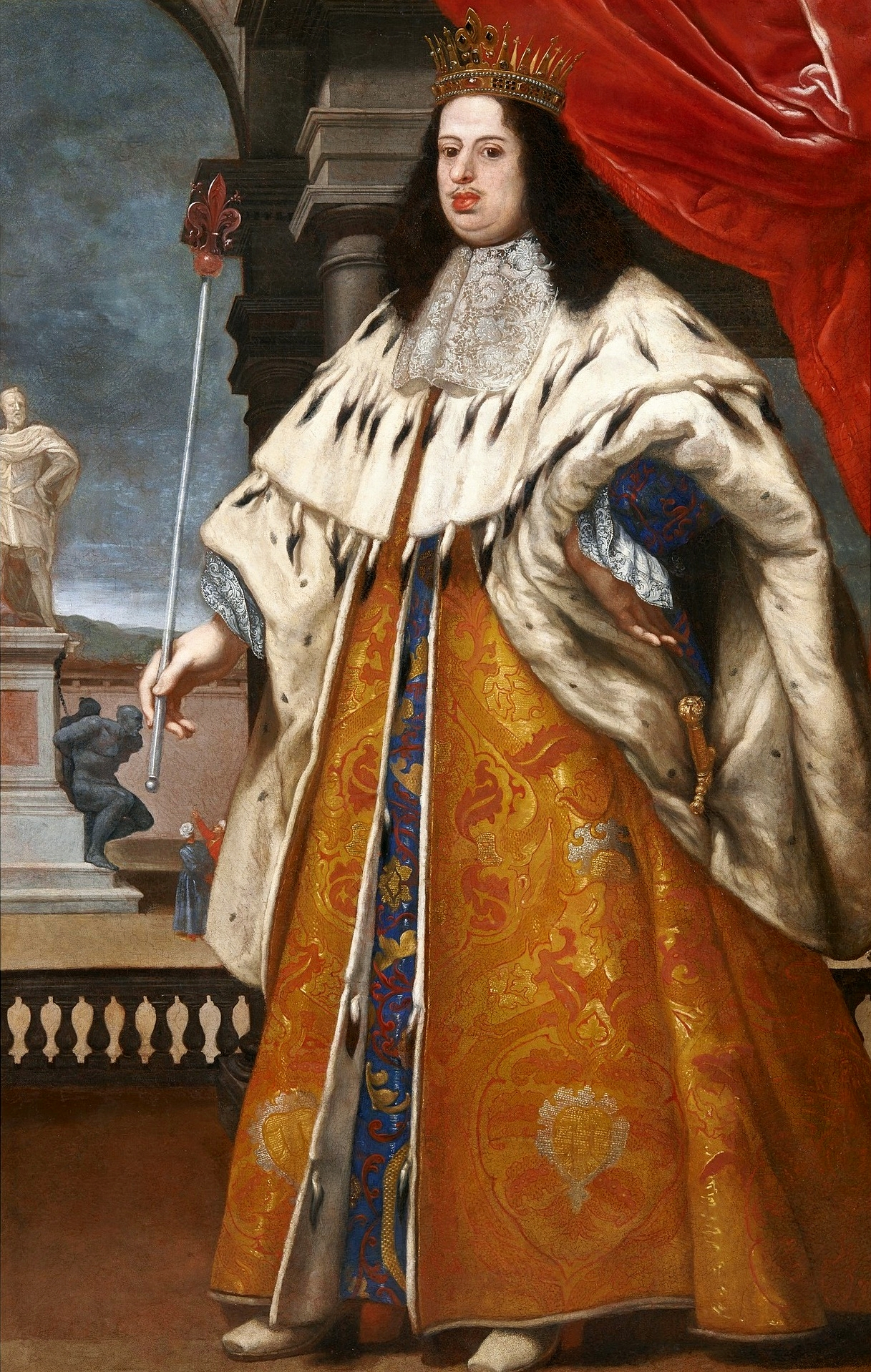
Cosimo III with the old grand ducal crown, without arches

In January 1570 Cosimo I was crowned by Pius himself at Rome, though by rights such an act was the prerogative of the Emperor. For this reason, Spain and Austria refused to acknowledge the new title, though France and England immediately acknowledged its validity. With time all Europe came around.

The crown of the Grand Duke of Tuscany was clearly distinct from both princely and ducal crowns. It was a gold circlet decorated with emeralds, rubies and pearls with rays projecting from the top.

Uniquely the crown had a large giglio bottonato, or Florentine lily – the florentine version of a fleur de lis which bears two tall stamens posed between the petals – positioned above the forehead.

== The new crown ==
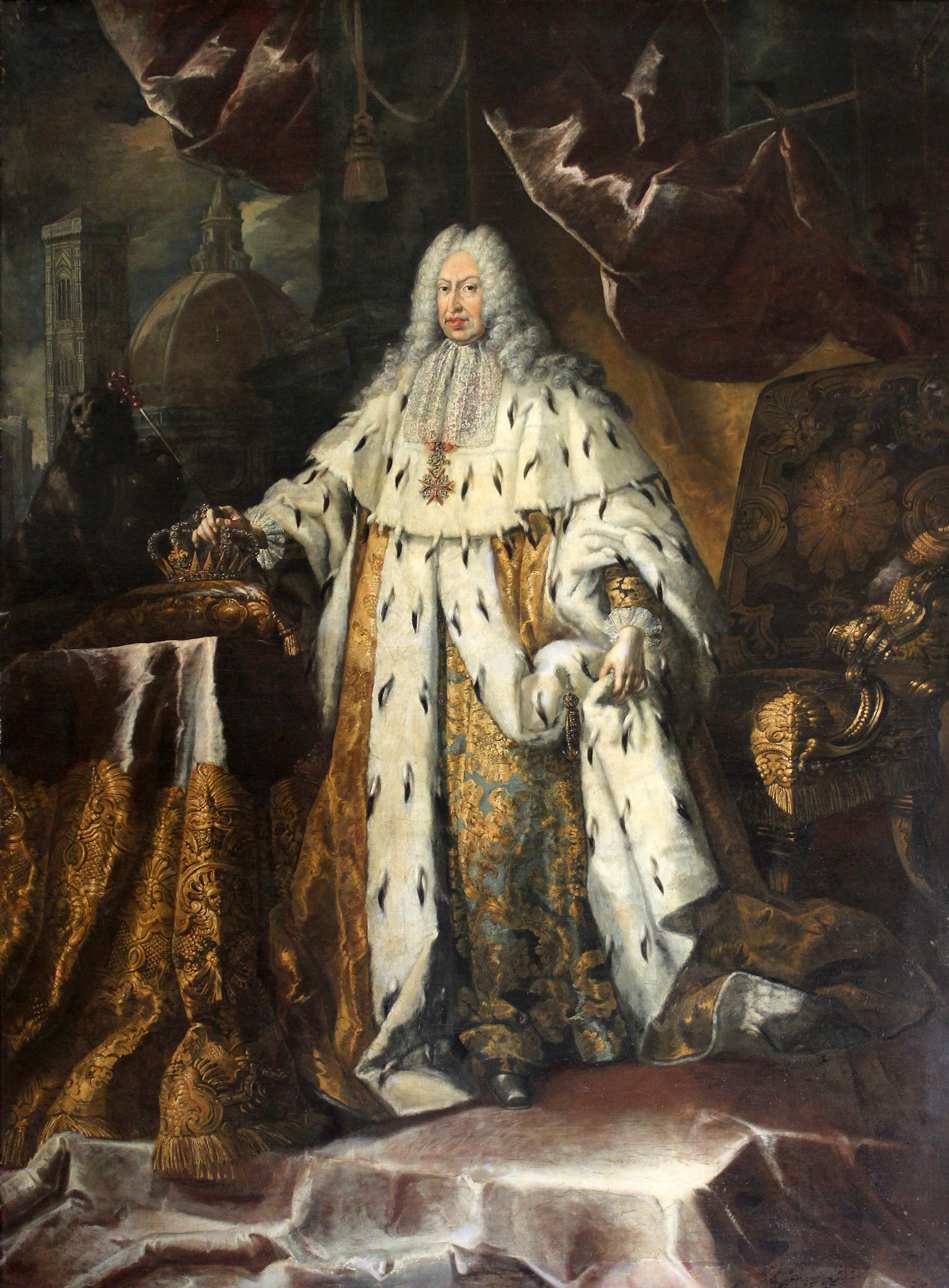
Gian Gastone with the new grand ducal crown, modified from the previous.

When Cosimo III, Grand Duke of Tuscany (1670–1723) received the "right to royal rank" from Vienna, he added arches and a globe to the top of the grand ducal crown, as these were the typical elements of a royal crown. The new status of the Grand Duchy included among other things a change of style from Altezza Serenissima to Altezza Reale.

The Grand Ducal Crown is only known from drawings and paintings, since it was lost during the Napoleonic Occupation. A copy of the crown was placed in the coffin of each of the Grand Dukes at their funerals. One of these, which belonged to Gian Gastone de' Medici (r. 1723–1737), who ruled from the family's last official residence the Pitti Palace (Palazzo Pitti), was recovered during a survey of the corpse and is now conserved in Florence.

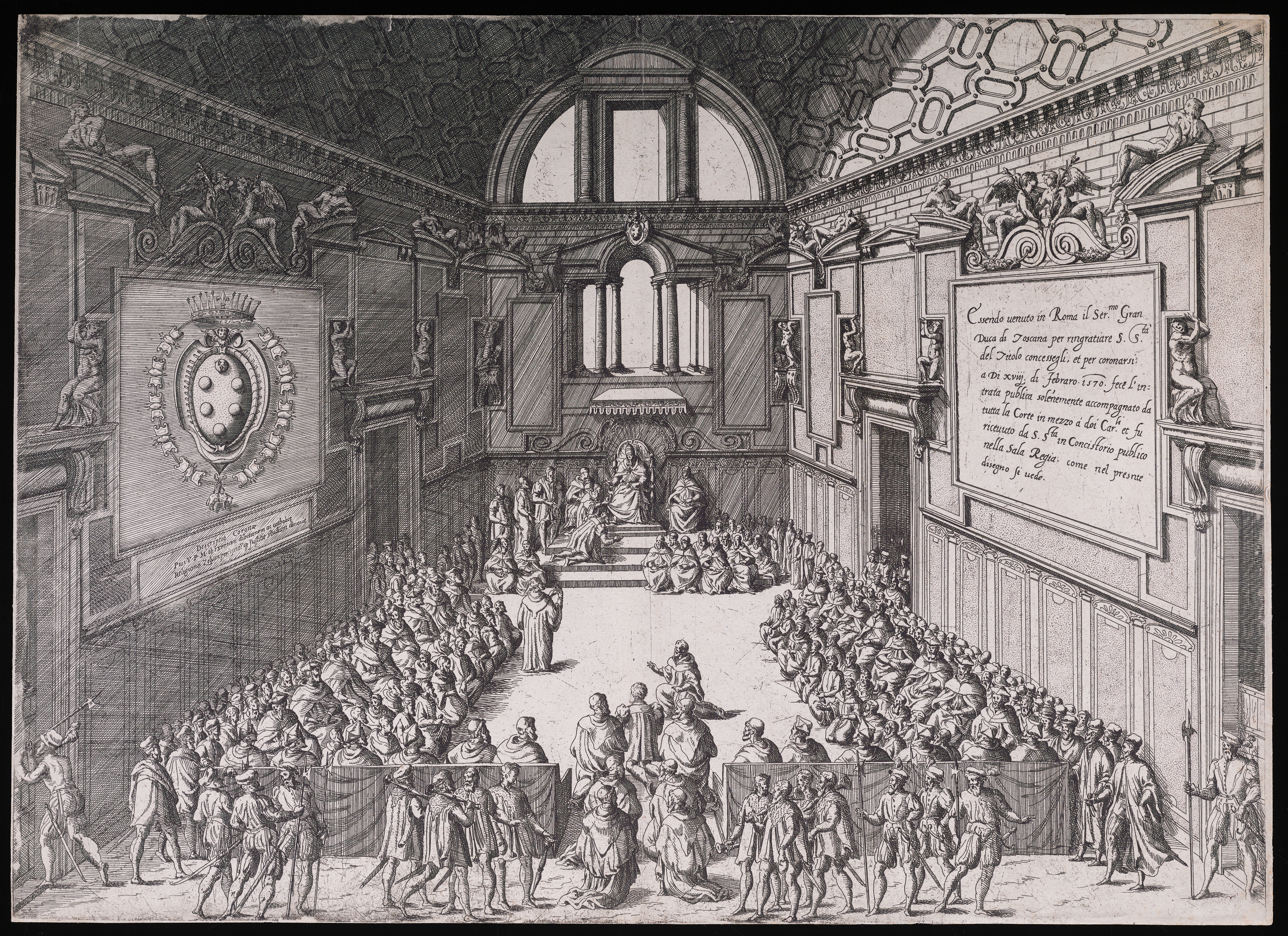
View of the coronation of Cosimo I de' Medici as Grand Duke of Tuscany by Pope Pius V in the Sala Regia of the Vatican Palace.
