= Gian Gastone de' Medici =

Grand Duke of Tuscany from 1723 to 1737

Gian Gastone
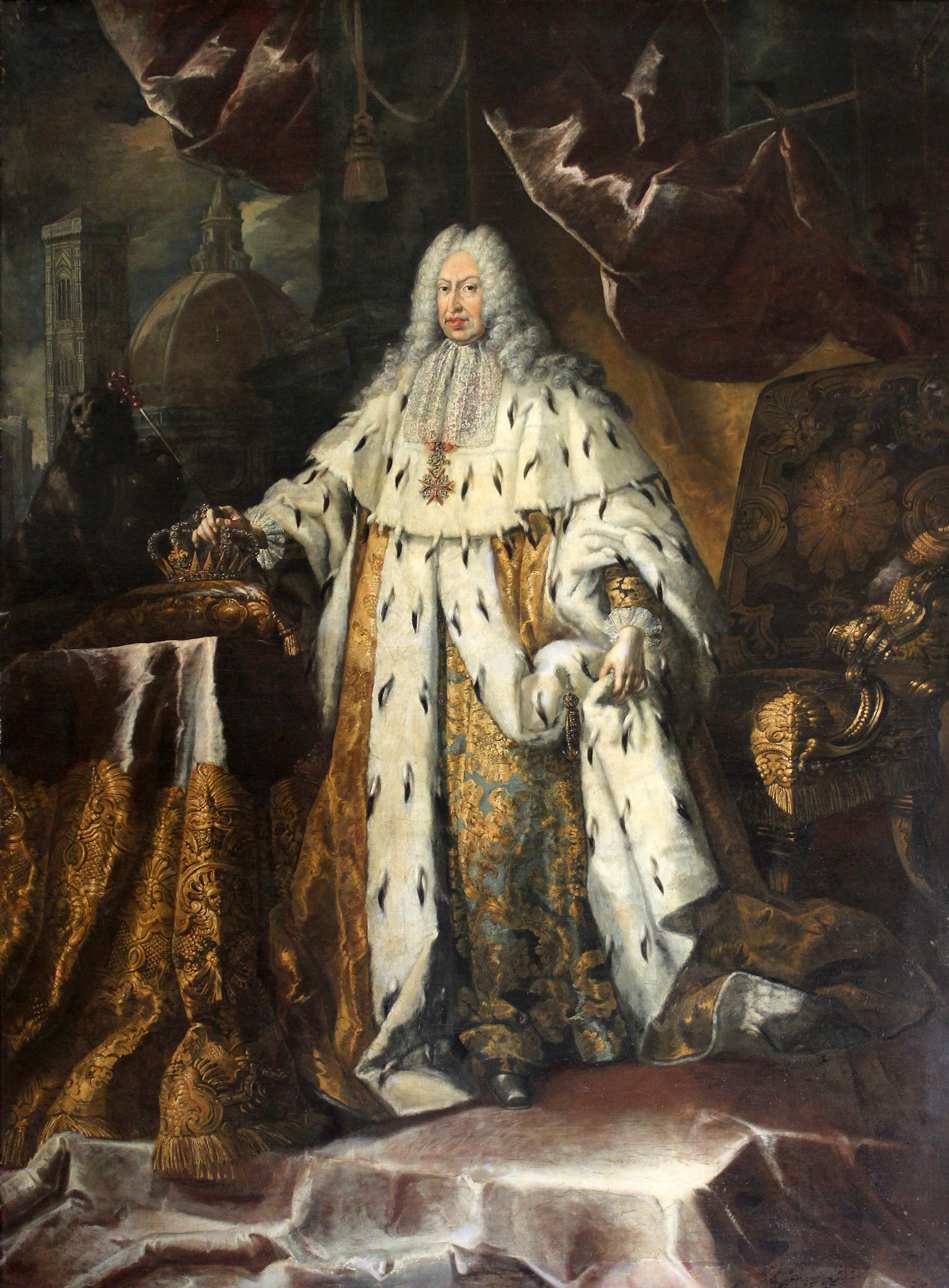
- Portrait by Franz Ferdinand Richter

Grand Duke of Tuscany
- Reign: 31 October 1723 – 9 July 1737
- Predecessor: Cosimo III
- Successor: Francis II Stephen
- Born: 25 May 1671; Palazzo Pitti, Florence, Grand Duchy of Tuscany
- Died: 9 July 1737 (aged 66); Palazzo Pitti, Florence, Tuscany
- Burial: July 1737; Basilica of San Lorenzo
- Spouse: Anna Maria Franziska of Saxe-Lauenburg (m. 1697)
Names
- Giovanni Battista Gastone de' Medici
- House: Medici
- Father: Cosimo III de' Medici
- Mother: Marguerite Louise d'Orléans
- Religion: Roman Catholicism

Gian Gastone de' Medici (born Giovanni Battista Gastone; 25 May 1671 – 9 July 1737) was the seventh and last Medicean grand duke of Tuscany.

He was the second son of Grand Duke Cosimo III de' Medici and Marguerite Louise d'Orléans. His sister, Electress Palatine Anna Maria Luisa, arranged his marriage to the wealthy and widowed Anna Maria Franziska of Saxe-Lauenburg in 1697. The couple despised each other and had no children. As Grand Prince Ferdinando, Gian Gastone's elder brother, predeceased Cosimo III, Gian Gastone succeeded his father in 1723.

His reign was marked by the reversal of his predecessor's conservative policy; he abolished taxes for poorer people, repealed penal laws which restricted Jews and discontinued public executions. The Medici were wanting in male heirs; his father, Cosimo III, wanted the Electress Palatine to succeed Gian Gastone. However, Spain, Great Britain, Austria and the Dutch Republic disregarded Cosimo's plan and appointed Charles of Spain—whose mother, Elisabeth Farnese, was a great-granddaughter of Margherita de' Medici—Gian Gastone's heir. Charles later transferred his claim to Francis Stephen of Lorraine pursuant to a preliminary peace that was finalized in 1738. Francis Stephen duly succeeded at Gian Gastone's demise, on 9 July 1737, ending almost 300 years of Medici rule over Florence. For the latter part of his reign, Gian Gastone chose to remain confined in his bed, tended by his entourage, the Ruspanti.

== Biography ==
=== Early years (1671–1697) ===
On 24 May 1671, the first anniversary of his grandfather Ferdinando II's death, Giovanni Battista Gastone de' Medici was born in Florence to Grand Duke Cosimo III and Marguerite Louise d'Orléans. He derived his baptismal name, Giovanni Battista Gastone, from his maternal grandfather, Gaston, Duke of Orléans. Cosimo and Marguerite Louise frequently quarreled. As a result, four years after his birth, Marguerite Louise returned home to France. Gian Gastone and his siblings were left in the care of their grandmother Vittoria della Rovere.

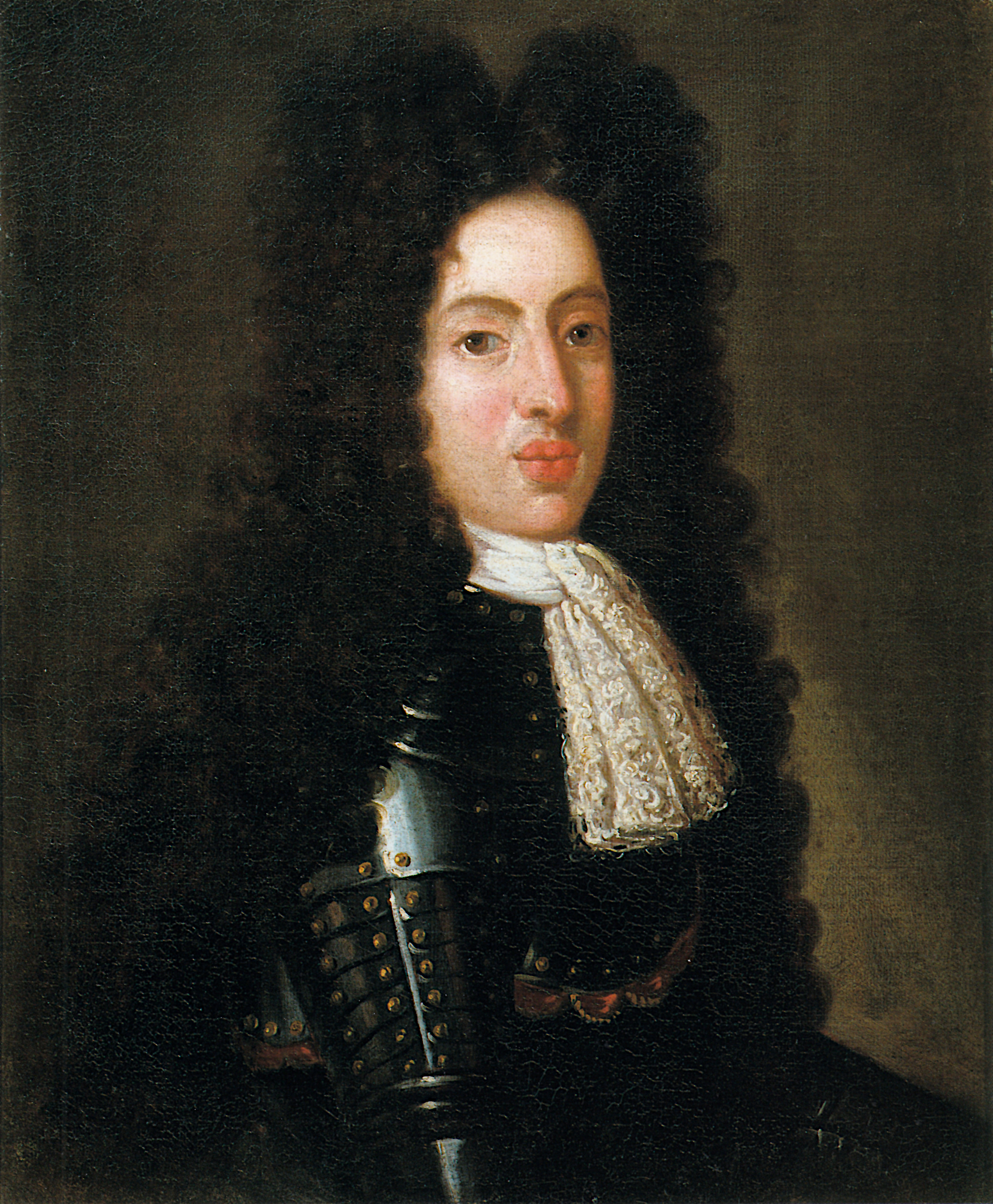
Portrait of a 20-year old Gian Gastone (after Niccolò Cassana, c. 1690)

Gian Gastone was tutored by Cardinal Henry Noris, whose company the prince hardly left. The Tuscan prince was an avid intellectual, being an antiquarian, a botanist and an amateur scientist. In addition, he could speak English, among other languages. However, it was these traits that earned Gian Gastone the disdain of his father and of his elder brother, Grand Prince Ferdinando; Gian Gastone was thus granted a scant allowance by his father and therefore could not enjoy the "dissipations" of court.

Cosimo III considered compelling Gian Gastone to become a cardinal. In order to rally Gian Gastone to its cause, Spain, concerned that another Medicean cardinal—Gian Gastone's uncle, Francesco Maria de' Medici, Duke of Rovere and Montefeltro, already enjoyed that dignity—would tip the scales in favour of France at a Papal conclave, offered to create him "General of the Spanish Seas". Peter II of Portugal, however, had other things in mind for him: he wanted Gian Gastone to marry his only daughter, Isabel Luísa, Princess of Beira. To marry her, Gian Gastone would have to convince his father to allot him an allowance of "adequate stature". However, the Grand Duke refused and neither the cardinalate nor the Portuguese marriage ever materialised.

Out of sympathy, Gian Gastone befriended his unhappy sister-in-law, Duchess Violante Beatrice of Bavaria. Her husband, Grand Prince Ferdinando, thought her too ugly and too dull for him. At the same time, Gian Gastone sank into a state of melancholy. In an attempt to rouse him from this condition, Cardinal Francesco Maria often summoned Gian Gastone to festivities at his villa, Lappeggi. However, these soirées had no effect and Gian Gastone continued to weep unceasingly in his private rooms.

=== Marriage and Bohemia (1697–1708) ===
By 1697, Violante Beatrice and Ferdinando had been married for eight years and still lacked issue, as did Gian Gastone's sister, the Electress Palatine. Concerned for the future of the dynasty, Cosimo urged the Electress to find Gian Gastone—currently the only one of his children unmarried—a suitable bride. She put forward Anna Maria Franziska, her brother-in-law's widow and potential heiress of the Duchy of Saxe-Lauenburg. The bride-to-be was described as "more like a Bohemian peasant than a princess" by a contemporary. They were married in Düsseldorf, the capital of the Electoral Palatinate, by the Bishop of Osnabrück on 2 July 1697. As she did not like cities or courts, Anna Maria Franziska demanded they establish themselves in her Bohemian residences, Ploskovice Castle and Reichstadt, post-haste.

Gian Gastone found life in the little village intolerable. Anna Maria Franziska was unpredictable and prone to outbursts of rage, she held "conversations in the stables [i.e. with the horses]" and would rather have remained a widow than have been married again. The lack of intellectual society there and his wife's hostility towards him drove Gian Gastone to increased drinking. Gian Gastone, unable to rein in his disgust, abandoned Anna Maria Franziska for Paris after one year in Reichstadt. When he arrived there, an enraged Cosimo, who had explicitly told his son not to leave Anna Maria Franziksa without his prior consent, ordered him back to Reichstadt. Anna Maria Franziska made an effort to welcome him back; however, her mood turned sour when Gian Gastone brought up the prospect of wintering in Prague. Thus, he went to Prague alone but for his suite and favourite attendant, Giuliano Dami.

Gian Gastone's once acclaimed complexion and weight were ruined by the course of dissipation he pursued in Prague, becoming blotchy and bloated respectively. Dami acted as a pimp for the Prince, soliciting countless young men for his master's enjoyment. The Prince frequently gambled, racking up exorbitant debts, losing on one occasion 150,000 crowns. His ruinous behaviour was relayed to Florence by the Electress Palatine. Gian Gastone replied to Cosimo's ensuing admonishments with an account of his married life, blaming Anna Maria Franziska's "capriciousness, peevish faces and sharp words" for his desperate conduct. Considering summoning him to Florence, Cosimo sent the Marquis Rinuccini to scrutinise his younger son's debts. Rinnucci was horrified to learn that the Archbishop of Prague was among his creditors. Anna Maria Franziska greeted Rinuccini warmly, and implied that Gian Gastone pawned some of her jewels to ameliorate his gambling debts. The Marquis concluded that nothing— not even the Holy Roman Empress's reproaches— could compel Anna Maria Franziska to Florence, where Gian Gastone longed to be. Forced once again to quell his enmity towards his wife, Gian Gastone returned to Reichstadt as per the Holy Roman Emperor and Holy Roman Empress's advice. Nevertheless, their reconciliation was brief, and Gian Gastone left for Hamburg in October 1703, only to return to Prague the next February.

The Grand Duke tired of the Princess of Saxe-Lauenburg's stubborn ways. He requisitioned the help of Pope Clement XI, who sent the Archbishop of Prague to tell her she must go to Florence with Gian Gastone. The Princess was incensed, replying that there was no point going with him because he was "absolutely impotent." Cosimo III conceded defeat and recalled Gian Gastone to Florence in 1708; he never saw his wife again.

=== Return to Florence (1708–1723) ===
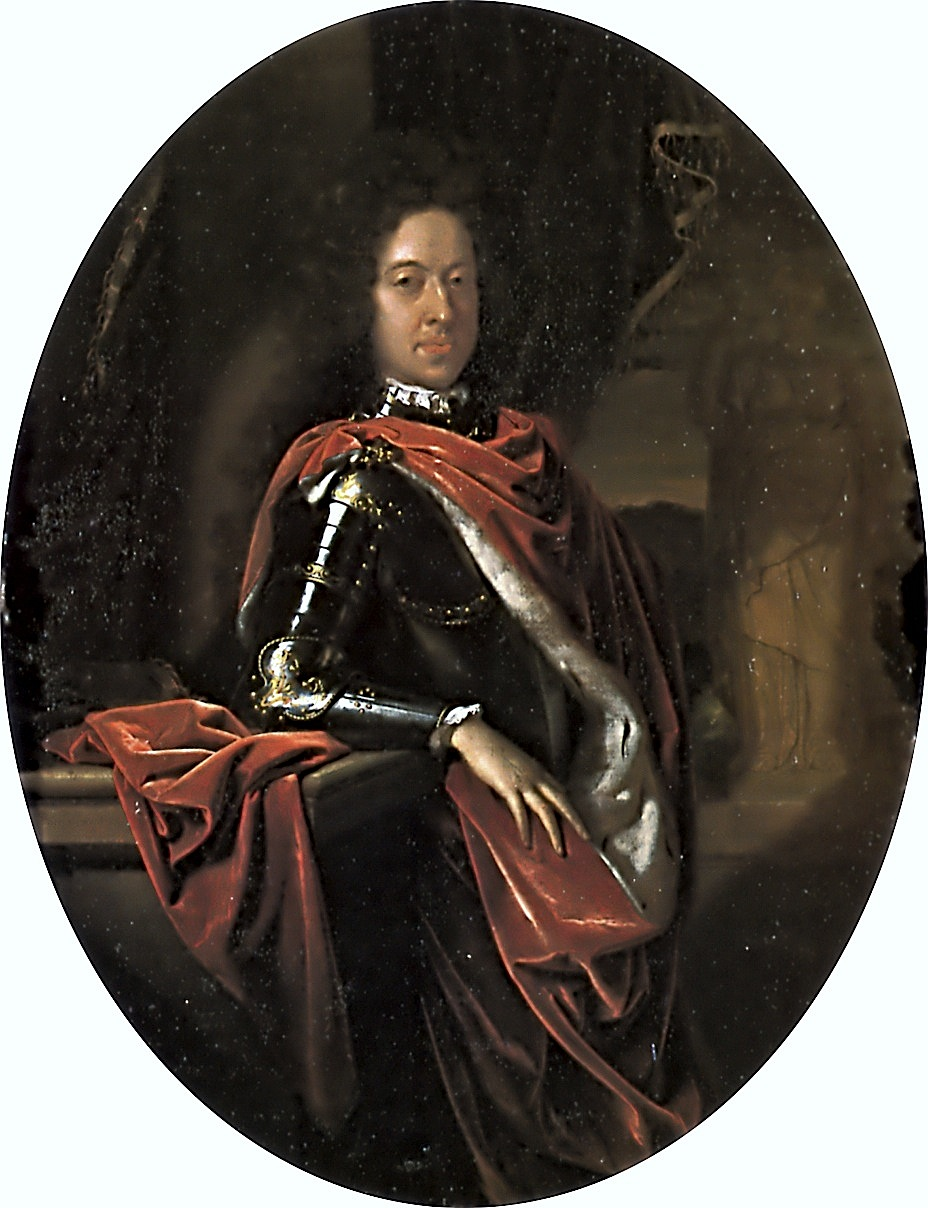
Gian Gastone by Adriaen van der Werff, 1710

As Prince Gian Gastone disliked his father's hyper-pious character, he elected to stay away from him and the royal court. The closed court that Gian Gastone did keep was dominated by his favourite, Dami. Meanwhile, Grand Prince Ferdinando was slowly dying from syphilis, making Gian Gastone's immediate succession more likely. Ferdinando, nonetheless, was not alone in his suffering: Guyot de Merville, a French adventurer, took note of Gian Gastone's mental decline: "He carries [apathy] so far that it is said he never opens a letter, to avoid having to answer." Additionally, Gian Gastone's fragile temperament required long periods of isolation; he spent several hours alone each night, drinking and staring up at the moon.

The Grand Prince finally succumbed to syphilis on 30 October 1713, sparking a succession crisis. Cosimo III deposited a bill in the Tuscan senate, the nominal legislature, provisioning for a male line succession failure by making the Electress Palatine Gian Gastone's heiress. It passed and was disseminated to chancelleries across Europe. Austria refused to sanction it, fearing that Tuscany would fall into the hands of the House of Bourbon. However, France and Great Britain did.

The Electress returned to Florence in October 1717, following the death of her husband the previous summer. Violante Beatrice of Bavaria, to whom Gian Gastone had become quite attached, disliked the Electress and therefore left the grand ducal court for the position of governor of the town of Siena. The Electress, now the First Lady of Tuscany, and Gian Gastone were not on good terms: he scorned her for marrying him to Anna Maria Franziska, who, for eleven years, made his life unbearable.

On 4 April 1718, Great Britain, France and the Dutch Republic (and later Austria) selected Charles of Spain, the elder child of Elisabeth Farnese (a great-granddaughter of Margherita de' Medici) and Philip V of Spain, as the Tuscan heir, the Electress's rights to the throne being completely disregarded in the process. All his ambitions in regards to the succession being thwarted, Cosimo III distributed one final proclamation shortly before his death, on 31 October 1723, decreeing that the Electress should succeed Gian Gastone. Unfortunately for Cosimo, his declaration was completely ignored.

=== Reign (1723–1737) ===
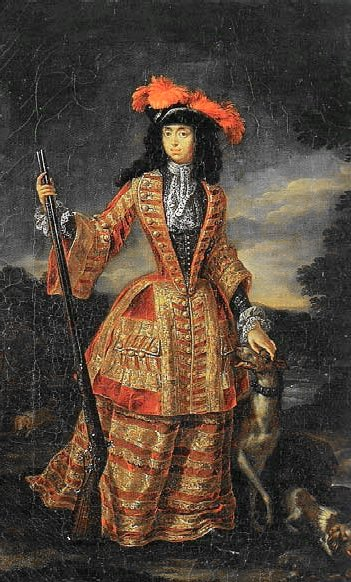
Anna Maria Luisa de' Medici, Electress Palatine of the Rhine, Gian Gastone's sister, by Jan Frans van Douven

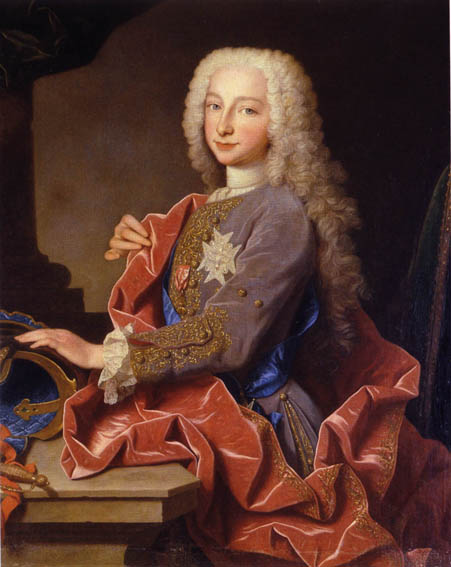
Charles of Spain by Jean Ranc, 1725

The Tuscany Gian Gastone inherited was in a pitiful state: the army numbered less than 3,000, the royal coffers were empty and Florence was full of beggars. The ramshackle condition of the capital was noted by philosopher Montesquieu five years into Gian Gastone's reign: "There is no town where men live in less luxury than Florence". Despite these hindrances, Gian Gastone, aged 52, commenced his reign with a burst of ebullience, releasing prisoners, abolishing exorbitant taxes, "Pensions on the Creed" (monies paid to converts to Christianity) and public executions.

Gian Gastone recalled Violante Beatrice to the royal court and banished his sister, the Dowager Electress, to the Villa La Quiete. The Governor reigned supreme over Tuscan society, and Gian Gastone delegated most of his public duties to her, and chose to spend most of his time in bed. Here, Gian Gastone was entertained by the Ruspanti, a team of poor, handsome young men assembled by Dami, who performed sexual acts for and with the Grand Duke. Loathing the aristocracy, Gian Gastone called the foremost Ruspanti by the names of prominent Tuscan nobles. A contemporary dubbed the head of the Ruspanti, Giuliano Dami, "the despot of Gian Gastone's court"; he exploited his influence with the Grand Duke by offering anybody who was willing to bribe him an audience with their monarch.

During the period 1723–1731, the powers-that-be busied themselves hammering out a solution to the "Tuscan question". Spain zealously endorsed its candidate, Charles of Spain, who had been made heir by the powers in 1718 but did not enjoy universal recognition; Austria would not accept another Bourbon monarch in Italy. Gian Gastone, knowing the Dowager Electress probably would never succeed, went about ensuring his sister's inheritance of all the House of Medici's private property. Thus, he separated Medici possessions from those of the state; hitherto, there had been no distinction between the two.

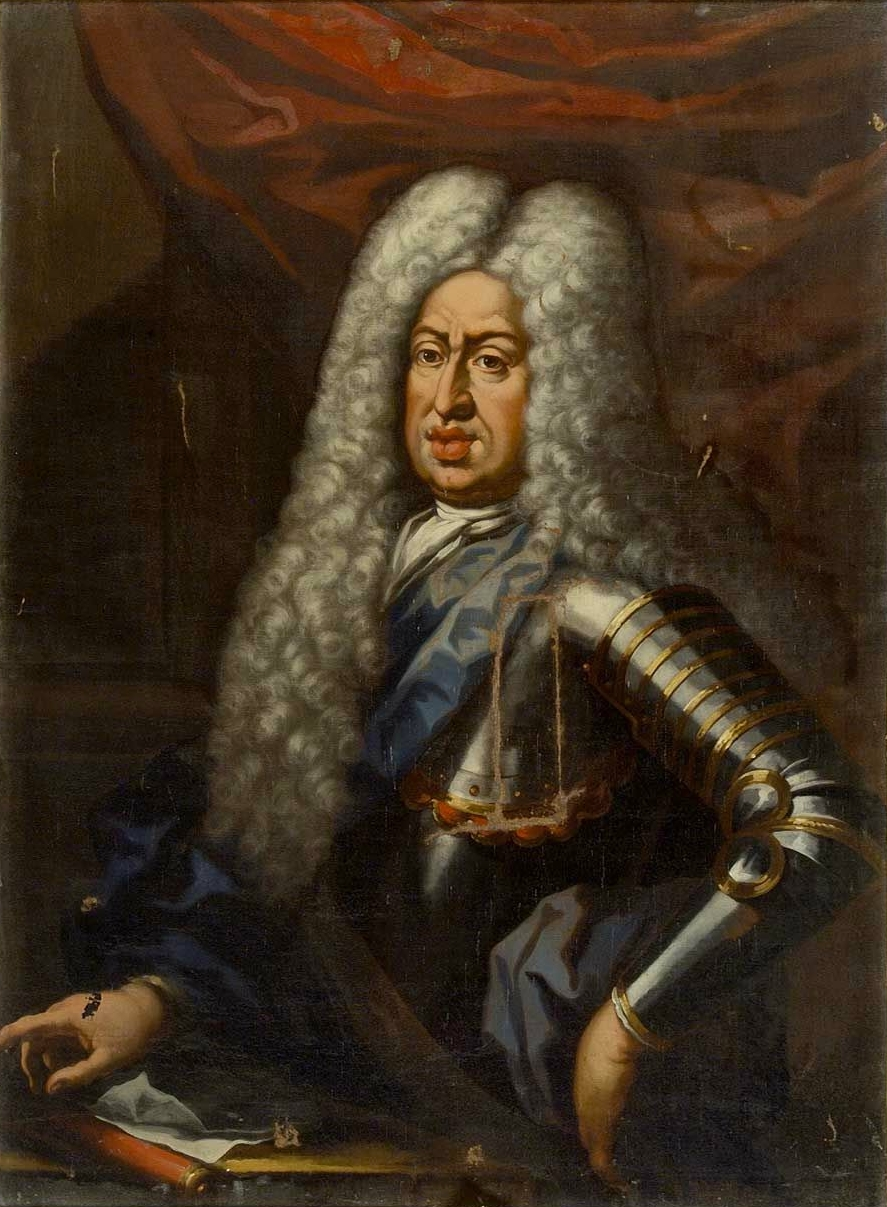
Gian Gastone in armour, painted after Franz Ferdinand Richter

Governor Violante Beatrice and the Dowager Electress, following the former's sojourn in Rome, in spite of their mutual dislike of each other, attempted to ameliorate Gian Gastone's decadent public image together. Violante Beatrice organised banquets to remove him from the sway of the Ruspanti. His behaviour at these sent guests running for their carriages: he vomited into his napkin, wiped his mouth with his peri-wig and told rude jokes. These parties ceased when Violante Beatrice died, in 1731; Gian Gastone was devastated by the loss of his beloved sister-in-law. Rumours abounded that the Grand Duke had died, as the public never saw him. To discredit these, the Dowager Electress induced Gian Gastone to make a public appearance—his final one—on Saint John the Baptist's day of 1729. An alcoholic, Gian Gastone drank too much before the ceremony and vomited repeatedly throughout; he had to be carried unconscious back to the Palazzo Pitti, the royal palace, on a litter. A sprained ankle incurred in July 1729 left the Grand Duke bed-ridden for—barring two occasions—the rest of his life.

The "Tuscan question" finally seemed resolved by the Treaty of Vienna (1731): in exchange for Spain and its allies' recognition of the Pragmatic Sanction of 1713, Austria confirmed Infante Charles as Gian Gastone's heir—the Grand Duke wasn't consulted. He was, however, appointed joint-guardian of the Infante with Dorothea Sophie of the Palatinate-Neuburg, Dowager Duchess of Parma and the Electress Palatine's sister-in-law. Thirty thousand Spanish troops occupied the Grand Duchy of Tuscany on Charles's behalf in October 1731. Charles, known as Duke of Parma since January, arrived in Florence the next March. Gian Gastone was taken with the Infante-Duke, showering him with gifts. He even went so far as to have the Duke created Grand Prince of Tuscany, the title borne by the Tuscan heir-apparent, against the wishes of the Holy Roman Emperor, Charles VI; however, the latter soon had the grant revoked.

After the War of the Polish Succession broke out in 1733, Charles marched a Spanish army south and defeated the Austrians holding the kingdoms of Naples and Sicily. Pursuant to preliminary peace terms negotiated in 1735 (but not finalized until after Gian Gastone's death with the 1738 Treaty of Vienna), Charles surrendered Parma to Emperor Charles VI and the claim to the Tuscan throne to Francis III of Lorraine in exchange for being crowned king of Naples and Sicily. (Francis was forced to surrender the Duchy of Lorraine to Stanisław Leszczyński, the losing claimant to the Polish throne.) Neither the Grand Duke nor Francis III were consulted. The latter was reluctant to cede his homeland to France, but the Holy Roman Emperor (soon to be his father-in-law) compelled him. Gian Gastone was angry; he had become quite attached to the Infante-Duke, and didn't like the prospect of a foreigner ruling Tuscany. Spain accordingly withdrew its troops from Tuscany in January 1737; 6,000 Austrians took their place on Francis's behalf.

=== Death and legacy ===
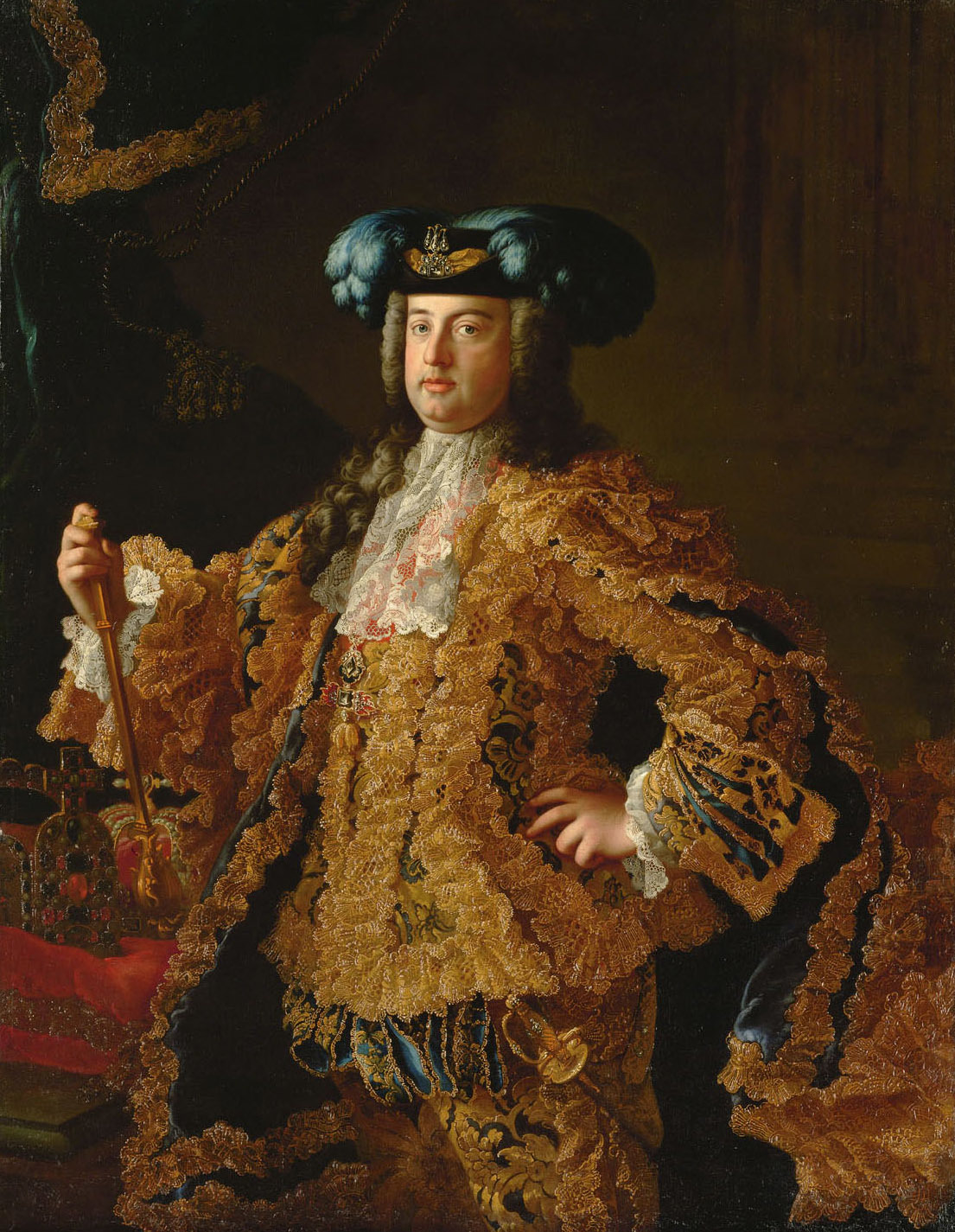
Francis III of Lorraine, Gian Gastone's successor, by Martin van Meytens, 1745

By the time of the Spanish withdrawal, the Grand Duke was dying from "an accumulation of diseases". One of his final acts was to order the erection of a statue of Galileo Galilei, who had been patronised by his great-grandfather Cosimo II and his grandfather Grand Duke Ferdinando II, in the Basilica of Santa Croce. Anna Maria Luisa, the Dowager Electress Palatine, rushed to his bedside when it became apparent he would not recover. Gian Gastone could not eat anything, and his condition steadily worsened; Anna Maria Luisa subsequently had him moved to a clean bed. Worried for her brother's soul, the Dowager Electress had the irreligious Gian Gastone repent for his sins. On 9 July 1737, in the fourteenth year of his reign, the last Medicean Grand Duke died. The Electress Anna Maria Luisa inherited all of the House of Medici's allodial possessions, but in accordance with the wishes of the great powers, Francis of Lorraine inherited the title of Grand Duke of Tuscany.

Gian Gastone had attempted to reform his realm, purging corrupt churchmen from government, reversing Cosimo III's ban of teaching "new ideas", i.e. the philosophy of Galileo et al., in the University of Pisa and abolishing income taxes. As a result, he was sincerely mourned by his people. Charles de Brosses, a French politician and writer, wrote, in 1739, "The Tuscans would give two-thirds of their property to have the Medici back, and the other third to get rid of the Lorrainers." This sentiment did not diminish much in 62 years, when, in 1799, during the French occupation of Tuscany, the people called for the long-dead Gian Gastone to ascend the throne. His remains were interred in the Medicean necropolis, the Basilica of San Lorenzo. His corpse was dressed in "black velvet", according to Official Report on the Examination of the Tombs in the Medici Mausoleum of 1857, "with, over this, the great cloak of Grand Master of the Order of Saint Stephen. On the head was the Grand Ducal crown, worn over a cap; and by his side the sceptre. But the crown and sceptre were corroded by the acids which had been used in embalming the body." The one group who may have taken exception to such adulation is the Freemasons whom, in his final year, under harsh penalty he forbade to meet.

As of August 2015, access to see his white rectangular marble tomb slab is denied. His remains are not under the white slab; they are under a grey circular stone near his slab. Under this grey stone is a red brick staircase which leads to an underground burial chamber that was studied for the first time ever in 2004. In the chamber are many family members. Gian Gastone had a lead coffin in a wooden frame. It was replaced with a modern coffin. Near him are the remains of many de' Medici children who were buried in unmarked graves. Some of them still have their garments.

Gian Gastone was descended from both Cosimo the Elder and Lorenzo the Elder through the marriage between Maria Salviati, grandchild of Lorenzo the Magnificent, and Giovanni de' Medici, great-grandson of Lorenzo the Elder. This becomes clearer when one understands their common ancestor: Giovanni di Bicci de' Medici, father to both Lorenzo the Elder and Cosimo de' Medici. Thus the kings of France from Louis XIII and on, are descended from the 'cadet' branch, continuing the House of Medici in the female line.

== Titles and styles ==
- 30 October 1713 – 31 October 1723: His Royal Highness The Grand Prince [of Tuscany]
- 31 October 1723 – 9 July 1737: His Royal Highness The Most Serene Grand Duke [of Tuscany]

== Ancestors ==
Ancestors of Gian Gastone de' Medici

8. Cosimo II de' Medici, Grand Duke of Tuscany
4. Ferdinando II de' Medici, Grand Duke of Tuscany
9. Maria Magdalena of Austria
2. Cosimo III de' Medici, Grand Duke of Tuscany
10. Federico Ubaldo della Rovere, Duke of Urbino
5. Vittoria della Rovere
11. Claudia de' Medici
1. Gian Gastone de' Medici, Grand Duke of Tuscany
12. Henry IV of France
6. Gaston, Duke of Orléans
13. Marie de' Medici
3. Marguerite Louise of Orléans
14. Francis II, Duke of Lorraine
7. Marguerite of Lorraine
15. Christina of Salm

== Bibliography ==
- Acton, Harold (1980). The Last Medici. London: Macmillan. ISBN 0-333-29315-0.
- Aldrich, Robert; Wotherspoon, Garry (2000). Who's Who in Gay and Lesbian History: From Antiquity to World War II [volume 1 Who's Who]: From Antiquity to the Mid-twentieth Century Vol 1. London: Routledge. ISBN 978-0-415-15982-1.
- Garrido, Fernando; Cayley, Charles Bagot (1876). A history of political and religious persecutions, Reprint: Arkose Press (September 26, 2015), ISBN 978-1343568808.
- Hale, J.R. (1977). Florence and the Medici. London: Orion. ISBN 1-84212-456-0.
- Levy, Carl (1996). Italian Regionalism: History, Identity and Politics. Oxford: Berg, 1996. ISBN 978-1-85973-156-7.
- Row, Augustus (1868). Masonic Biography and Dictionary J.B. Lippincott & Company, Reprint: Kessinger Publishing, LLC; First edition (September 10, 2010) ISBN 978-1165041398.
- Strathern, Paul (2003). The Medici: Godfathers of the Renaissance. London: Vintage. ISBN 978-0-09-952297-3.
- Young, G.F. (1920). The Medici: Volume II. London: John Murray.

Gian Gastone de' Medici House of Medici Born: 14 May 1671 Died: 7 July 1737
Regnal titles
Preceded by Cosimo III de' Medici	Grand Duke of Tuscany; 1723–1737	Succeeded by Francis Stephen of Lorraine
Religious titles
Preceded by Cosimo III de' Medici	Grand Master of the Order of St. Stephen; 1723-1737	Succeeded by Francis Stephen of Lorraine
Italian royalty
Preceded by Ferdinando de' Medici	Grand Prince of Tuscany; 1713–1723	Succeeded by Francis Stephen of Lorraine
