= Maria Cristina de' Medici =

Tuscan princess (1609–1632)

Maria Cristina
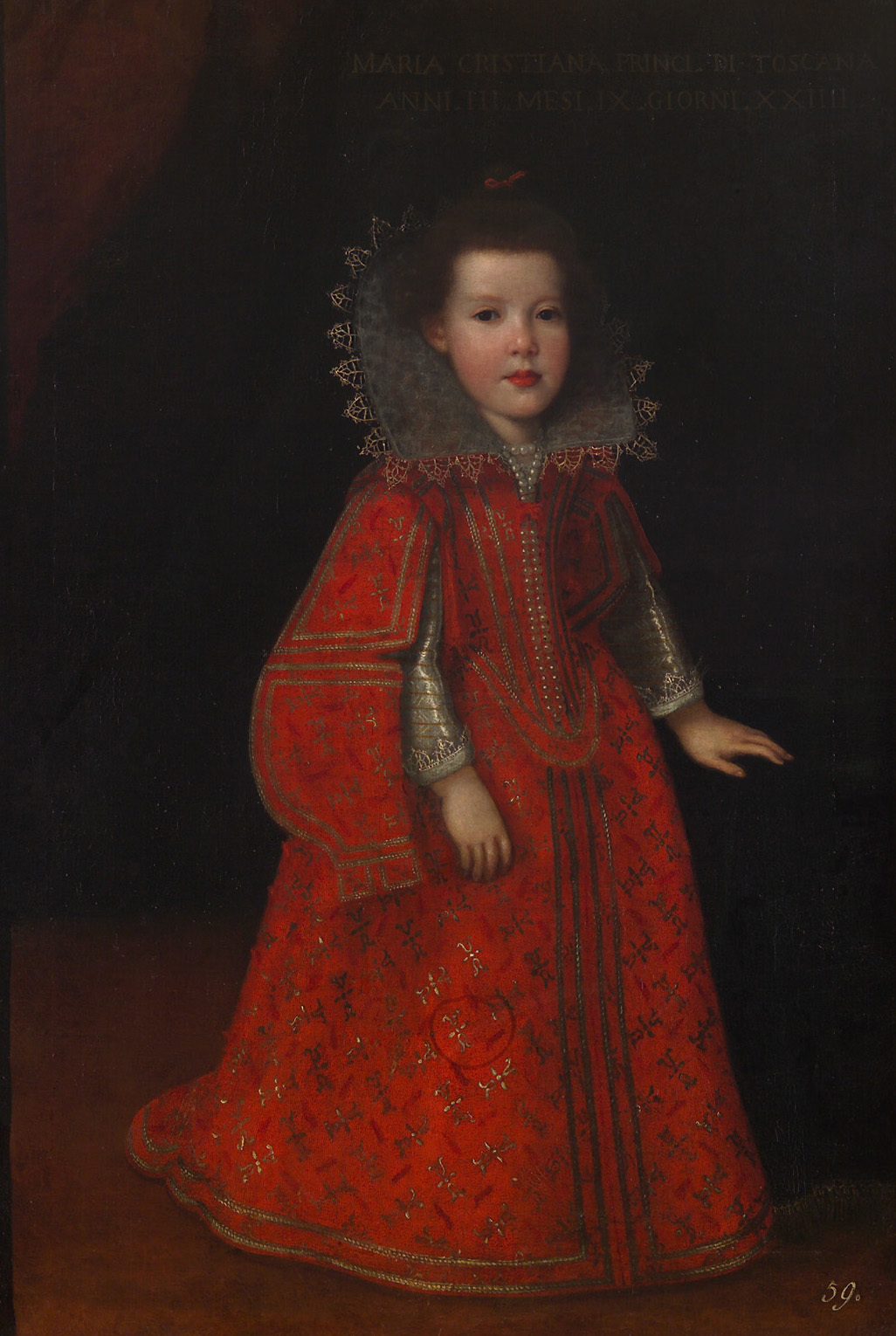
- Maria Christina in 1613, now in the Kunsthistorisches Museum, Vienna
- Born: 24 August 1609; Florence; Grand Duchy of Tuscany
- Died: 9 August 1632 (aged 22); Villa del Poggio Imperiale; Arcetri, Florence; Grand Duchy of Tuscany
- House: Medici
- Father: Cosimo II de' Medici, Grand Duke of Tuscany
- Mother: Archduchess Maria Maddalena of Austria

Maria Cristina de 'Medici (24 August 1609 – 9 August 1632) was a Tuscan princess and the first born child of Cosimo II de' Medici, Grand Duke of Tuscany. Born physically disabled and possibly mentally disabled, she died unmarried in 1632.

== Biography ==
Born ten months after her parents' marriage, Maria Cristina de 'Medici was born on 24 August 1609 in Florence as the first child of Cosimo II de' Medici, Grand Duke of Tuscany and Archduchess Maria Maddalena of Austria. She was born with a physical disability and was possibly mentally disabled. She was baptized in the Catholic faith on 21 November 1610.

Once proposed as a bride for Odoardo Farnese, Hereditary Prince of Parma, he instead married her sister Margherita.

In 1619 she was sent to live in the Convent of the Holy Conception run by the Order of St. Stephen, but never took monastic vows.

She died on 9 August 1632 at the Villa del Poggio Imperiale, and a portrait of her survives at the Kunsthistorisches Museum in Vienna.

In 1857, her tomb in the Medici Chapel was opened, and her remains examined. During the examination, several observations were made:

[...] only the lace that formed the graniglia and some of the metal flowers that made up the crown remained. The hair removed from the skull was mixed with the bones [...]
