= Franz Ferdinand Richter =

German painter

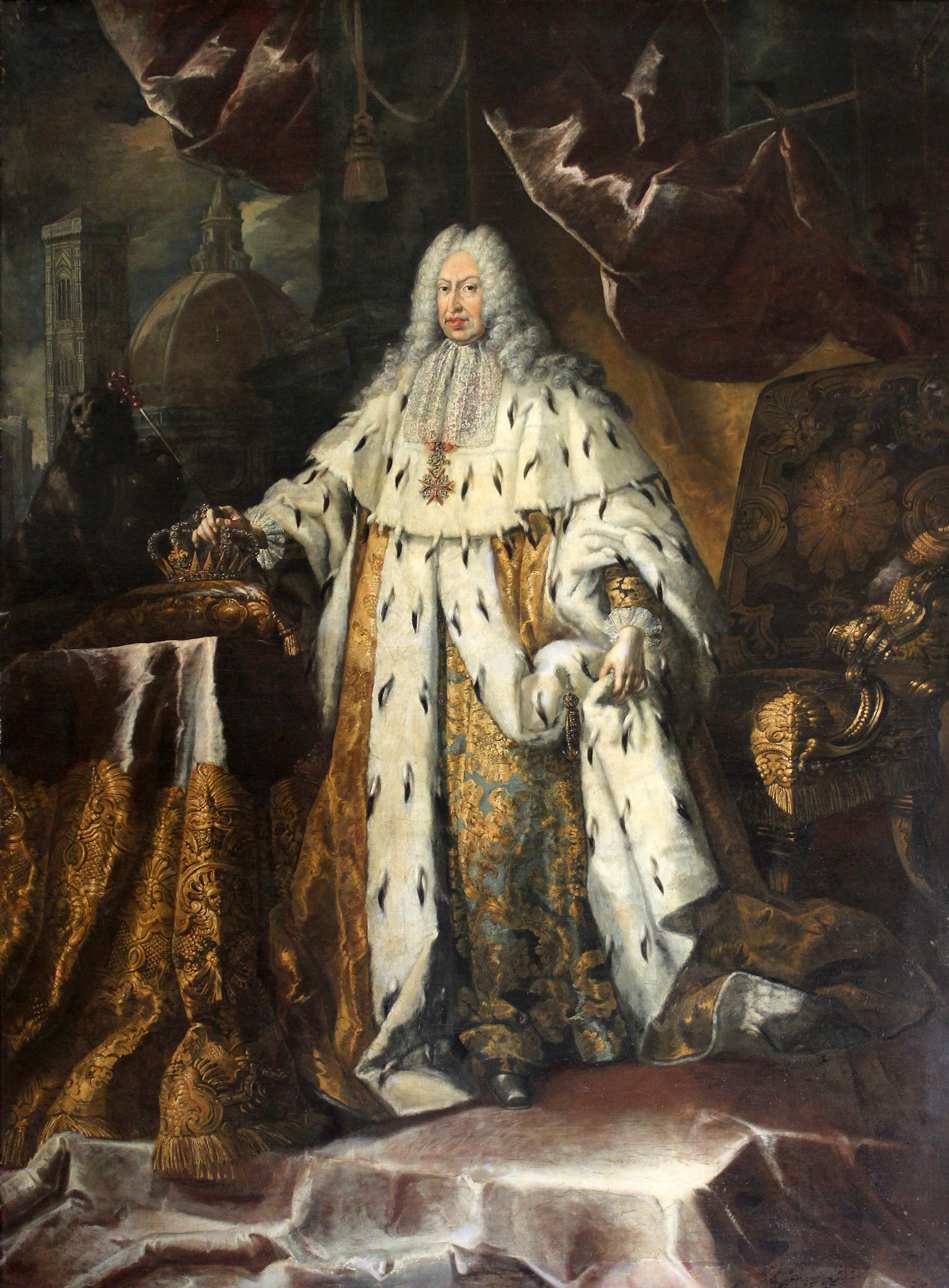
Franz Ferdinand Richter, Gian Gastone de' Medici, Grand Duke of Tuscany, 1737 (Palazzo Pitti)

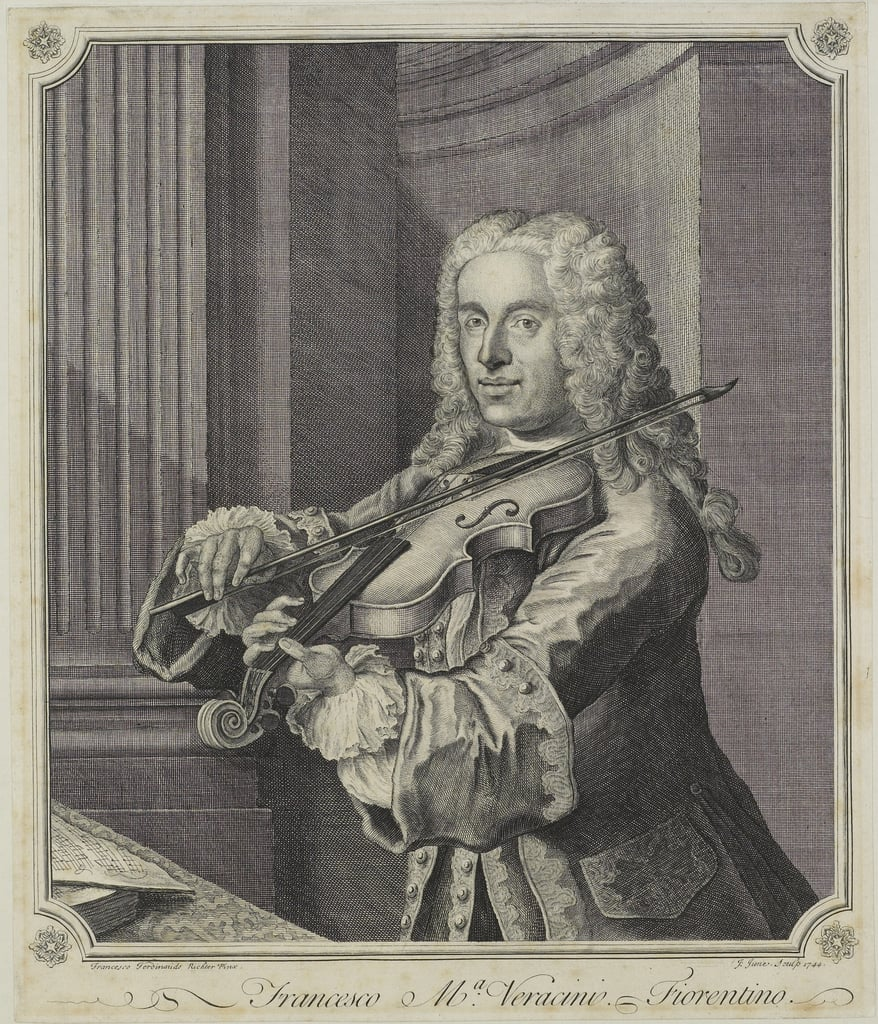
Francesco Maria Veracini; engraving by John June, after a painting by Richter

Franz Ferdinand Richter (c.1693, Ebersdorf, near Breslau - after 1737, Florence) was a German Baroque painter who worked in Italy.

== Life and work ==
Information on his early life is almost totally lacking. He was first documented on 18 May 1727, when he was in Rome; applying for a passport to return home. It is certain that he was a long time resident of Florence; and that he died there.

Works known to be his include a portrait of the violinist and composer, Francesco Maria Veracini, which is better known as an engraving by the English artist, John June. He also created an altarpiece for the Church of the Assumption in Aschbach, which suggests a connection to work done at Ebrach Abbey. There is also record of a portrait of the poet and playwright, Giovan Battista Fagiuoli, from 1736, whose current location is unknown. His self-portrait (c.1720/25) is in the Uffizi Gallery.

In the Galleria Palatina at the Palazzo Pitti, there is a monumental portrait of Gian Gastone de' Medici, wearing his Grand Ducal paraphernalia, in rococo style; one of his last dated works from 1737.
