= Giuliano Dami =

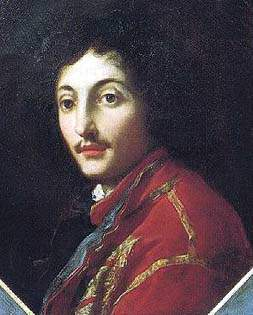
- Giuliano Dami in his twenties, by Anton Domenico Gabbiani (c. 1708). Bagno a Ripoli (Florence), Collection of Alberto Bruschi.
- Born: 14 September 1683; Mercatale in Val di Pesa, (Grand Duchy of Tuscany)
- Died: 5 April 1750 (aged 66); Florence (Grand Duchy of Tuscany)
- Resting place: Santa Maria del Carmine, Florence
- Employer: Gian Gastone de' Medici
- Spouse: Maria Vittoria di Simone di Raffaello Selcini
- Partner: Gian Gastone de' Medici
- Parents: Angelo di Vincenzo Dami (father); Caterina di Cristofano Ambrogi (mother)

Giuliano Dami (14 September 1683 – 5 April 1750) was the favourite and valet (Aiutante di Camera) of Gian Gastone de' Medici, Grand Duke of Tuscany (1723 – 1737). He is known for the "magnetic influence" he exercised on the last Medici Grand Duke of Tuscany, and for his relationship with him.

== Biography ==
=== Early life ===
Son of Angelo (Agnolo) di Vincenzo Dami and Caterina di Cristofano Ambrogi, Giuliano was of popular origins. He had three sisters and one brother: Maria (1685 – 1688), Maria Maddalena (1688 – 1757), Anna Maria (born 1690) and Angelo (1693 – 1737). His father died in 1693 and Giuliano was sent to a farmer in Cavalier Lenzoni's landholdings of Marignolle (Florence), being assigned to menial jobs.

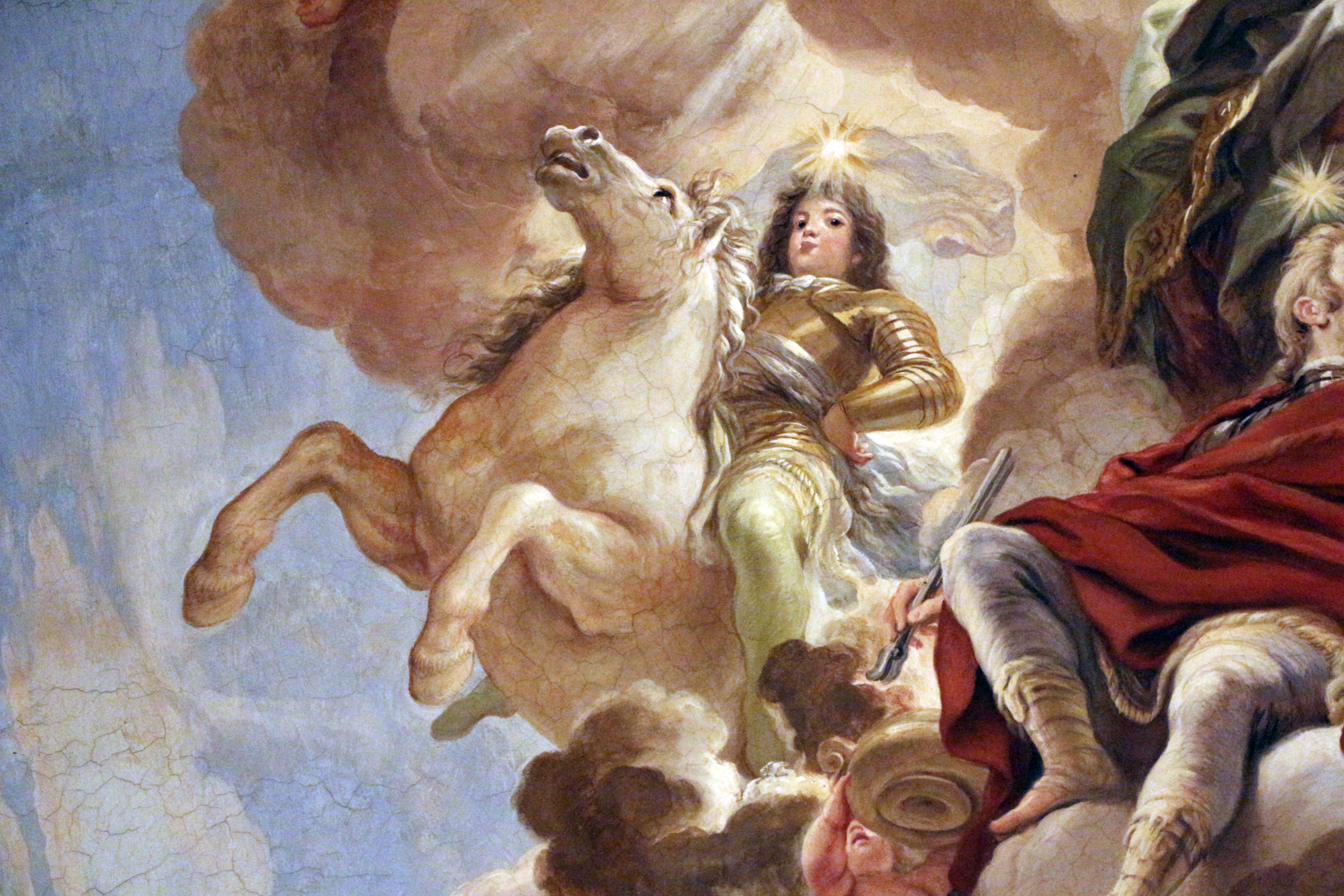
Gian Gastone de' Medici as Castor or Pollux, in Palazzo Medici Riccardi's Gallery frescoed by Luca Giordano (1682/1685).

By 1701, at the age of 18, Giuliano was at the service of Marquis Ferdinando Capponi, as a groom. Marquis Capponi was Knight of the Holy Military Order of Saint Stephen Pope and Martyr, Rector of the Priory of Pescia, Grand Chancellor and aide-de-chambre to the late Grand Duke Ferdinando II, then dignitary of the court of Grand Duke Cosimo III and Bracciere of the Great Princess Violante Beatrice of Bavaria.

=== With Gian Gastone de' Medici ===
During a visit of his master to the Medici court in Palazzo Pitti, Dami, who was said to possess an exceptional physical beauty, struck with his appearance the young Prince Gian Gastone, who asked Capponi to give him the servant. Since then, Dami entered upon domestic familiarity with Gian Gastone and became his lover and companion in adventures.

On 3 July 1697, Gian Gastone had left for Bohemia to marry the German Princess Anna Maria Franziska of Saxe-Lauenburg, eventually returning to Florence on 11 June 1705. He and Giuliano Dami met just between June 1705 and May 1707, when the Prince left again for Bohemia, now in the company of Dami. Initially they stayed in Zákupy/Reichstadt (the capital of the Princess' State) and Ploskovice/Ploschkowitz, two smallest Bohemian villages, then, without Princess Anna Maria, in Prague and Paris. There, Dami acted as a pimp for the Prince, soliciting countless young men for his master's enjoyment.

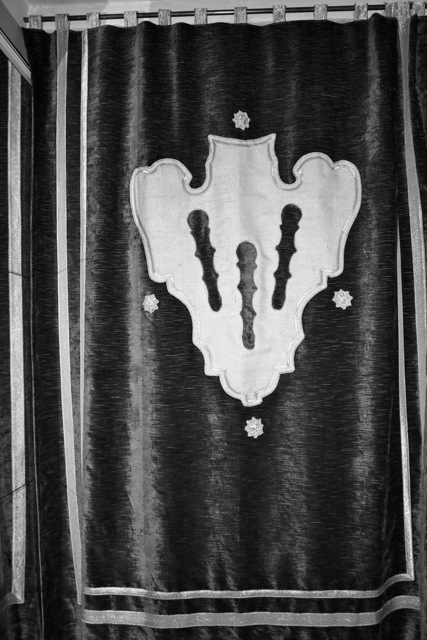
Coat of arms of Giuliano Dami displayed in Palazzo Dami, in Florence.

In 1708, Gian Gastone abandoned his wife and returned to Florence with Giuliano, who in the meantime had become his real éminence grise, and in 1723 he succeeded to his father Cosimo III (Grand Prince Ferdinando, Gian Gastone's older brother, had died prematurely in 1713). The Tuscany Gian Gastone inherited was in a pitiful state: the army numbered less than 3,000, the royal coffer was empty and Florence was full of beggars. Despite these hindrances, Gian Gastone, aged 52, commenced his reign with a burst of ebullience, releasing prisoners, abolishing exorbitant taxes and public executions.

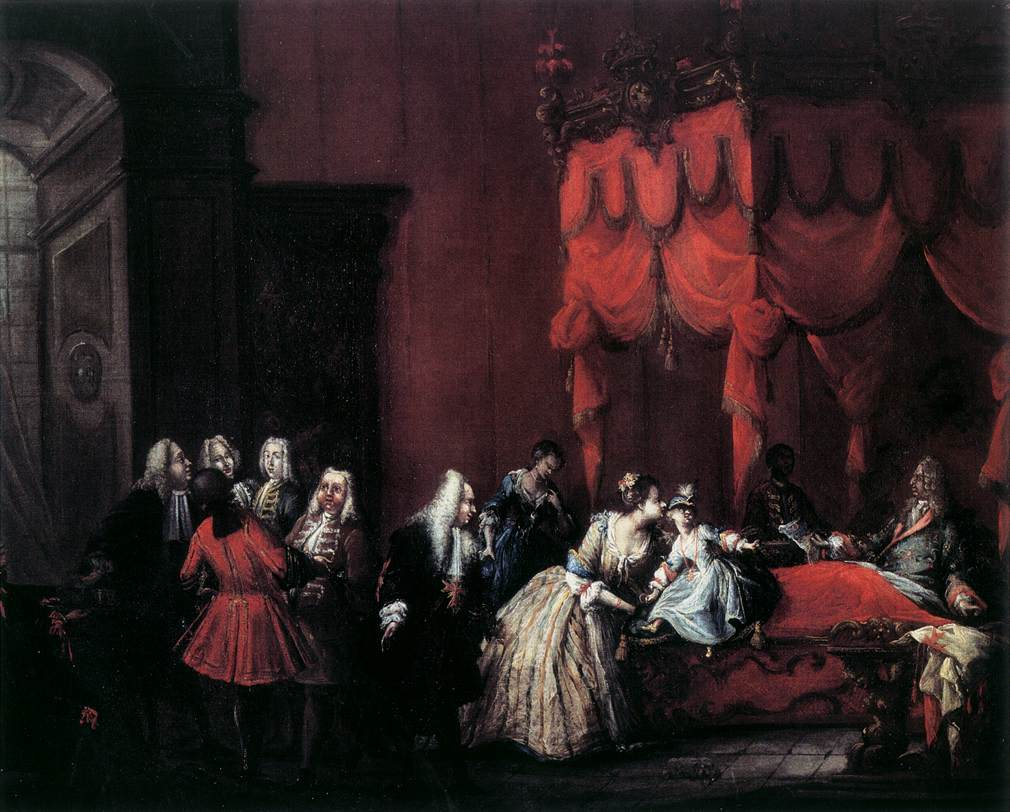
Gian Gastone de' Medici living in his bedchamber, by anonymous (1735).

The Governor Violante Beatrice, Grand Prince's Ferdinando widow, reigned supreme over Tuscan society, and Gian Gastone delegated most of his public duties to her, and chose to spend most of his time in bed, living mainly at night. Here, Gian Gastone was entertained by the Ruspanti (from the ruspo, the coin they were awarded with on Tuesdays and Saturdays), a team of poor, handsome young men assembled by Dami, who performed sexual acts for and with the Grand Duke. Knights, citizens and foreigners figured among the Ruspanti too. A contemporary dubbed the head of the Ruspanti, Giuliano Dami, "the despot of Gian Gastone's Court, and absolute master of his desires"; he exploited his influence with the Grand Duke by offering anybody who was willing to bribe him an audience with their monarch. Dami and the Ruspanti seized almost completely the time of the Grand Duke and their omnipresence during his last years embarrassed historians for a long time.

Gian Gastone de' Medici died religiously on 29 July 1737. The European powers had decided in 1735 that, after the last male Medici's death, Tuscany would go to Francis Stephen, Duke of Lorraine and Bar.

=== Life outside the court ===
On 1 October 1715, Giuliano Dami married the 27 year-old Maria Vittoria di Simone di Raffaello Selcini. On 2 November 1721, he entered the Consiglio dei Duegento. In December of the same year, he became Procuratore di Palazzo, being confirmed on 1 June 1722 (the office was semiannual). On 7 September 1733, Dami bought a villa in Broncigliano, a hamlet of Scandicci (Florence). Giuliano Dami died on 5 April 1750 at the age of 66 and was buried in Santa Maria del Carmine, in Florence. His widow died on 31 January 1760 at the age of 72. In 1770, their heirs sold the villa of Broncigliano. The remains of Giuliano Dami disappeared between 1771, when a fire devastated the church, and 1775, when its restoration was completed.

== Bibliography ==
- Acton, Harold (1980). The Last Medici. London: Macmillan. ISBN 0333293150.
- Bruschi, Alberto (1998). Giuliano Dami. Aiutante di Camera del Granduca Gian Gastone de' Medici (in Italian) (2° ed.). Florence: Opus Libri. ISBN 88-8116-033-1.
- Ombrosi, Luca (1965). Vita dei Medici sodomiti (in Italian). Milan: Canesi.
- Strathern, Paul (2003). The Medici: Godfathers of the Renaissance. London: Vintage. ISBN 978-0-09-952297-3.
