= Claudia Colla =

Italian ducal mistress and alleged witch (died 1611)

Claudia Colla (died 1611) was an Italian alleged witch, and the ducal mistress of the sovereign Ranuccio I Farnese, Duke of Parma. She was convicted for witchcraft, accused of having caused the childess marriage of her former lover the Duke by use of witchcraft, alongside her mother Elena Colla and Antonia Zanini.

== Life ==
Claudia Colla belonged to the Parmesan merchant class. She was described as an attractive girl. She became the lover of the Duke when she was fifteen. During her tenure as Ducal mistress, she and her mother Elena Colla lived in the Ducal Palace in Parma. She had two children with the Duke. In 1599, her ducal lover Farnese married Margherita Aldobrandini for political reasons. Due to the marriage, Claudia Colla and her mother and children were forced to leave the Ducal Palace.

Ranuccio I suffered from heart disease, epilepsy and mood swings. He also suffered from a lack of healthy heirs within his marriage. Two of Margherita Aldobrandini's pregnancies ended prematurely, and two resulted in the birth of children who died shortly after birth. Eventually, Ranuccio I became convinced that his misfortunes were caused by the Devil through a witch.

After a decade of childless marriage, Farnese accused Claudia Colla and her mother Elena for having caused the lack of offspring by the use of sorcery. The accusation of sorcery was unusual for someone of her class. The accusation was launched after Claudia Colla had requested that the Duke acknowledge his natural children by her. This caused the Duke to suspect that Colla caused the infertility of his marriage in order to benefit her own children with him.

Claudia and Elena Colla were imprisoned first in Rocchetta and later in the cellar of the Castle Gragnano on Trebbia. They were subjected to torture, which resulted in them confessing to the crimes of witchcraft. They confessed to having used magic to make the Duke fall in love with Claudia Colla; to cause the illness of the Duke; and to ensure that no healthy children where to be born by the Duchess. They also named Antonia Zanini as their assistant, and Zanini was arrested and confessed to be a Devil worshipper and having met Satan.

The confessions caused the convictions of the accused. Claudia Colla was judged guilty and both she and her mother was sentenced to be executed by burning. She was executed by burning at the stake.

== Bibliography ==
- Ce.unipr.it
- Dallasta, Federica, Luca Ceriotti, Il Posto Di Caifa
