= Vittoria Farnese =

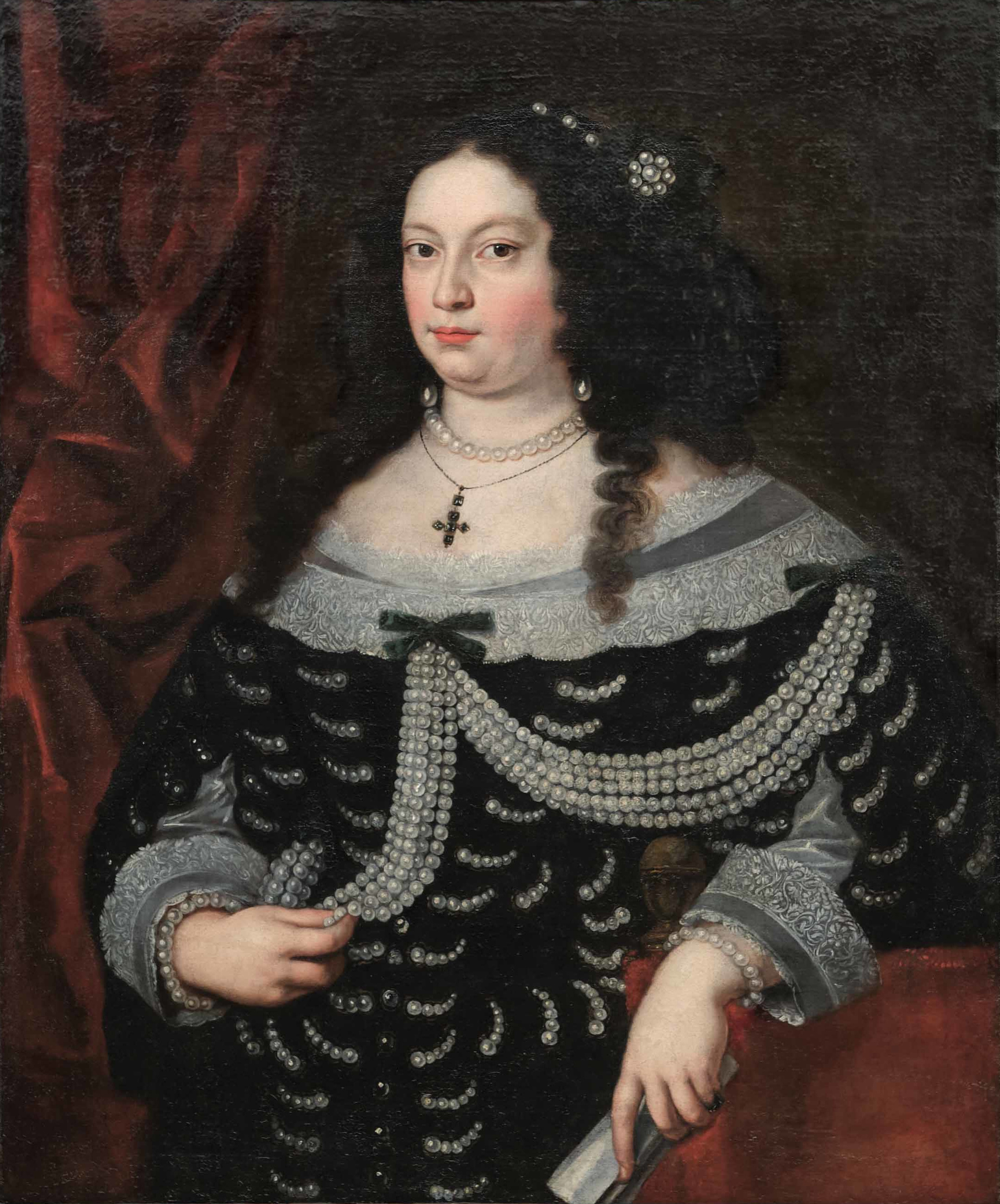

Duchess consort of Modena and Reggio
- Tenure: 12 February 1648 – 10 August 1649
- Born: 29 April 1618; Parma, Duchy of Parma and Piacenza
- Died: 10 August 1649 (aged 31); Modena, Duchy of Modena
- Spouse: Francesco I d'Este, Duke of Modena
- Issue: Vittoria d'Este
- House: House of Farnese (by birth); House of Este (by marriage)
- Father: Ranuccio I Farnese, Duke of Parma
- Mother: Margherita Aldobrandini

Vittoria Farnese (29 April 1618 – 10 August 1649) was an Italian noblewoman, and by her brief marriage to Francesco I d'Este, she became duchess of Modena and Reggio.

== Life ==
Vittoria Farnese was born in Parma, the daughter of Ranuccio I Farnese, Duke of Parma and Margherita Aldobrandini, niece of Pope Clement VIII.

On 12 February 1648 she married Francesco I d'Este, widower of her sister Maria Farnese. Vittoria died in Modena in 1649, while giving birth to the couple's only child, also named Vittoria (1649–1656). Francesco then married a third time, to Lucrezia Barberini, in Loreto in October 1654.
