= Francesco Maria Farnese =

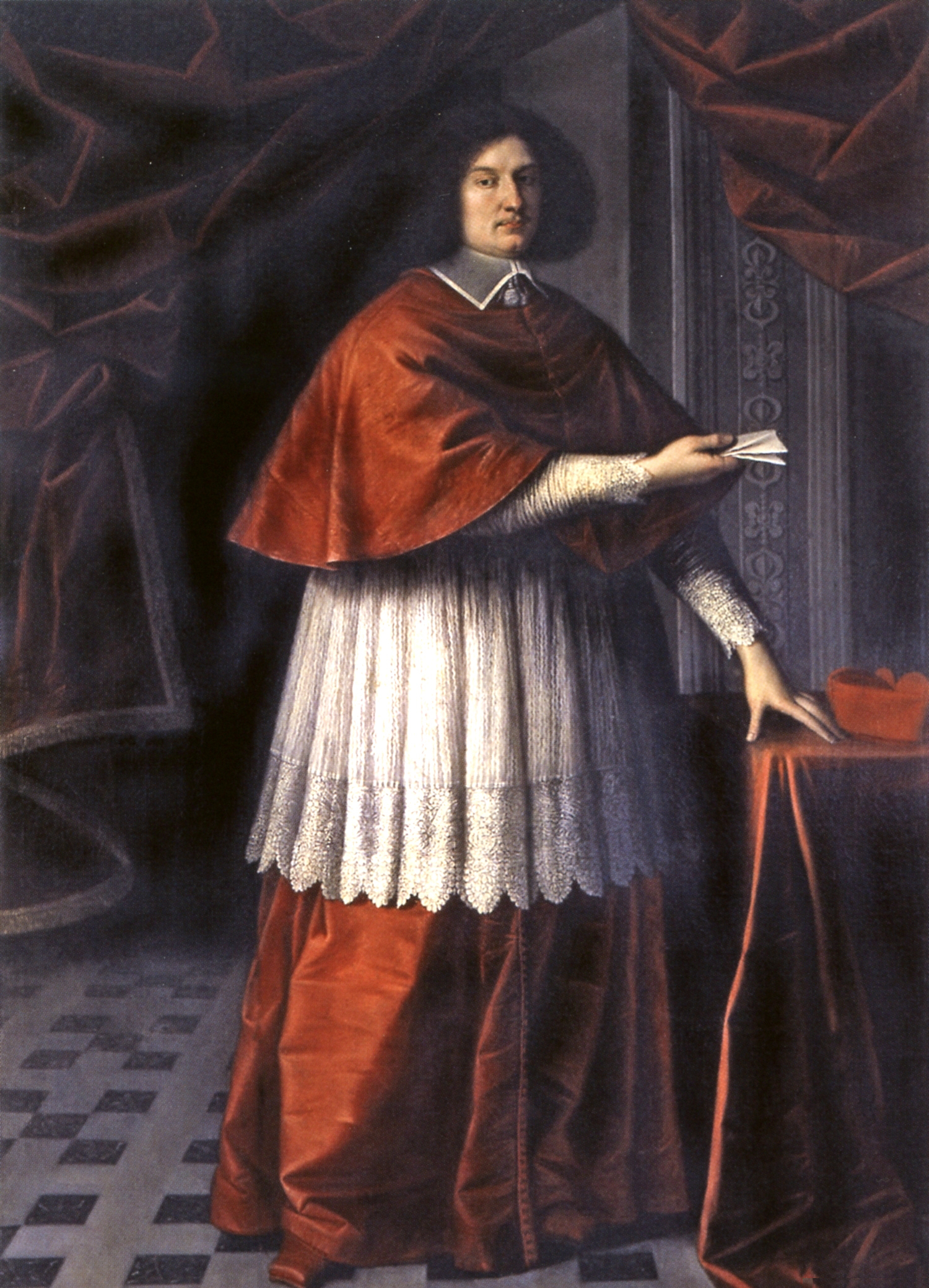
Francesco Maria Farnese

Francesco Maria Farnese (15 August 1619 – 12 July 1647) was an Italian Roman Catholic cardinal.

He was born in Parma, the son of Ranuccio I Farnese, duke of Parma, and Margherita Aldobrandini, niece of Pope Clement VIII. He was appointed as cardinal by Pope Innocent X in 1644, but he never came to Rome to receive the cardinalatial hat. After the death of his brother Odoardo I Farnese in 1646, Francesco Maria acted for two years as regent of the Duchy of Parma of Piacenza for his nephew Ranuccio II.

He died at Parma in 1647.
