= Cosimo II de' Medici =

Grand Duke of Tuscany from 1609 to 1621

Cosimo II
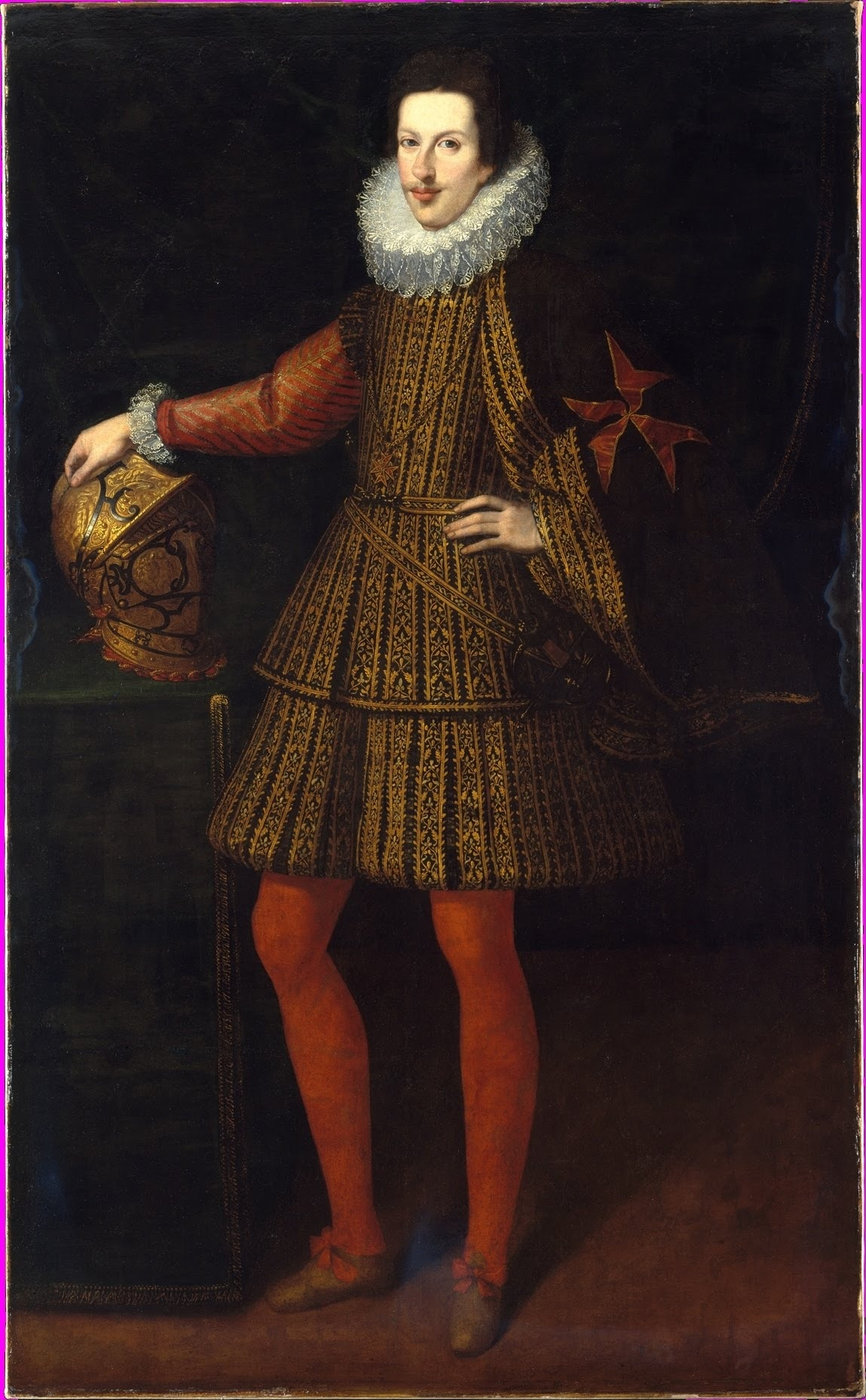
- Cosimo II after Justus Sustermans

Grand Duke of Tuscany
- Reign: 17 February 1609 – 28 February 1621
- Predecessor: Ferdinando I
- Successor: Ferdinando II
- Born: 12 May 1590; Palazzo Pitti, Florence, Grand Duchy of Tuscany
- Died: 28 February 1621 (aged 30); Palazzo Pitti, Florence, Grand Duchy of Tuscany
- Spouse: Maria Maddalena of Austria (m. 1608)
- Issue Detail: Maria Cristina; Ferdinando II, Grand Duke of Tuscany; Cardinal Gian Carlo; Margherita, Duchess of Parma; Mattias, Governor of Siena; Francesco; Anna, Archduchess of Austria; Cardinal Leopoldo
Names
- Cosimo de' Medici
- House: House of Medici
- Father: Ferdinando I
- Mother: Christina of Lorraine
- Religion: Roman Catholicism

Cosimo II de' Medici (12 May 1590 – 28 February 1621) was Grand Duke of Tuscany from 1609 until his death. He was the elder son of Ferdinando I de' Medici, Grand Duke of Tuscany, and Christina of Lorraine.

For the majority of his 12-year reign, he delegated the administration of Tuscany to his ministers. He is best remembered as the patron of Galileo Galilei, his childhood tutor.

== Biography ==
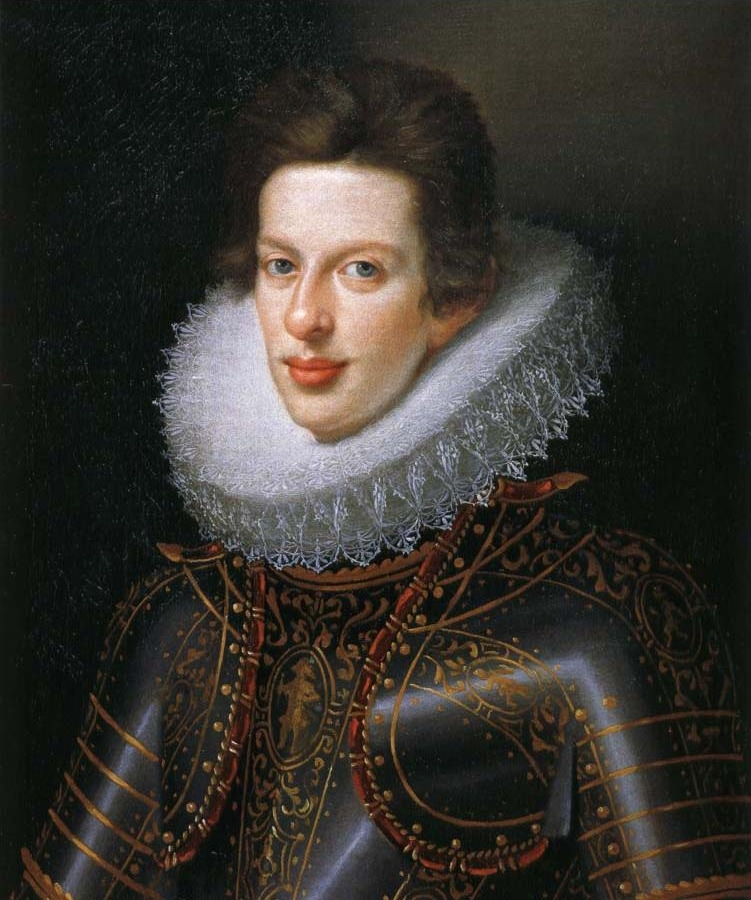
Cristofano Allori: Cosimo II

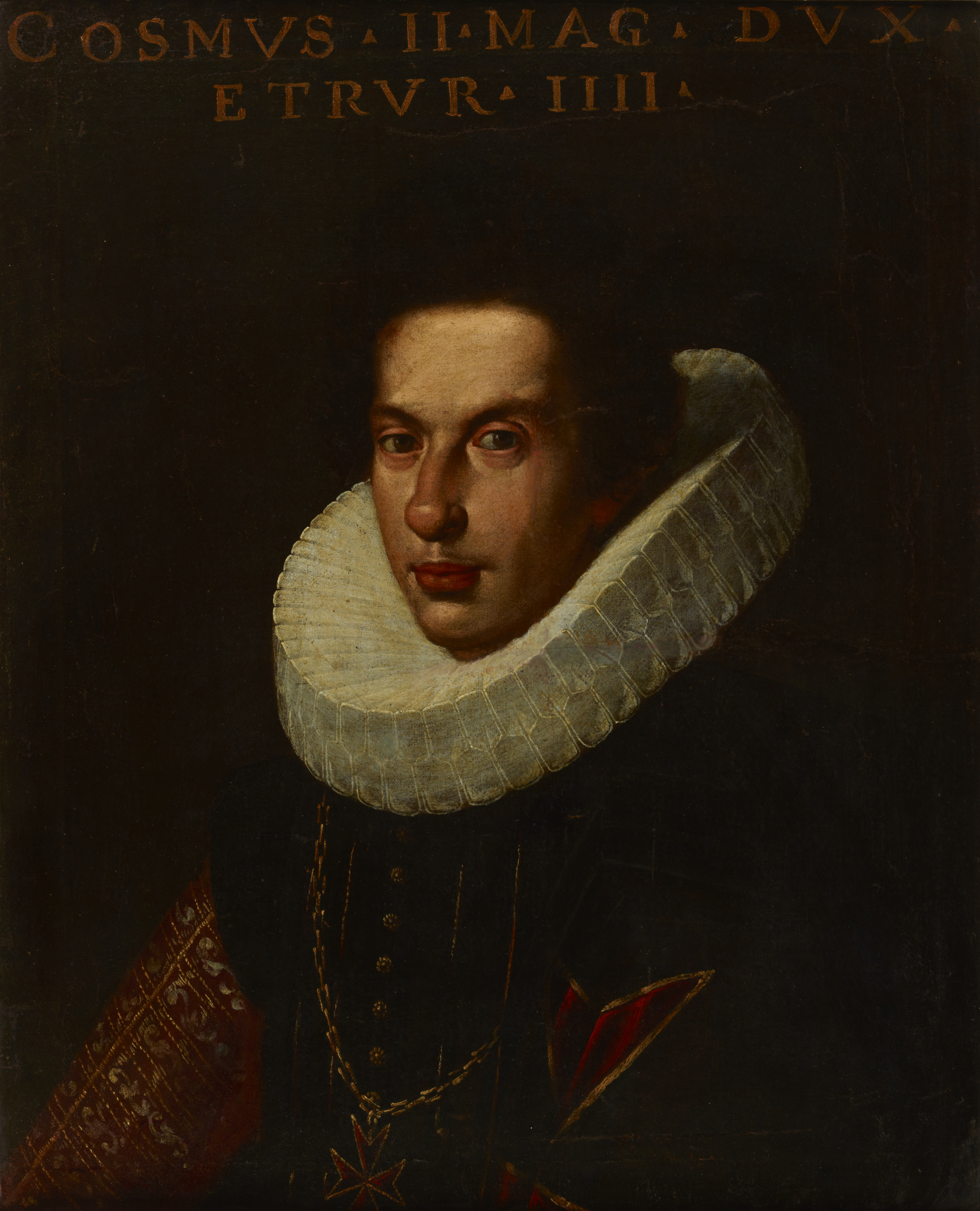
Portrait of Cosimo II de' Medici, 17th century, National Museum in Kraków

Cosimo's father Ferdinando I took care to provide him with a modern education. Indeed, Galileo Galilei was Cosimo's tutor between 1605 and 1608. Ferdinando arranged for him to marry Archduchess Maria Maddalena of Austria, daughter of Archduke Charles II, in 1608. Their marriage was celebrated with an elaborate display on the Arno, which included a performance of the Argonautica, in which Jason sailed around an artificial island and presented Maria Maddalena with six red apples, alluding to the Medici family symbolic balls, or palle. Cosimo and Maria Maddalena had eight children in just eight years; among them was Cosimo's eventual successor, Ferdinando II, an Archduchess of Inner Austria, a Duchess of Parma and two cardinals.

Ferdinando I died in 1609. Due to his precarious health, Cosimo did not actively participate in governing his realm, but he was a great patron of science and letters. Just over a year after Cosimo's accession, Galileo dedicated his Sidereus Nuncius, an account of his telescopic discoveries, to the grand duke.

Cosimo extended the Palazzo Pitti, and he reconstructed the Villa del Poggio Imperiale.

In spite of his lack of interest in governance, the grand duke did assiduously enlarge the navy.

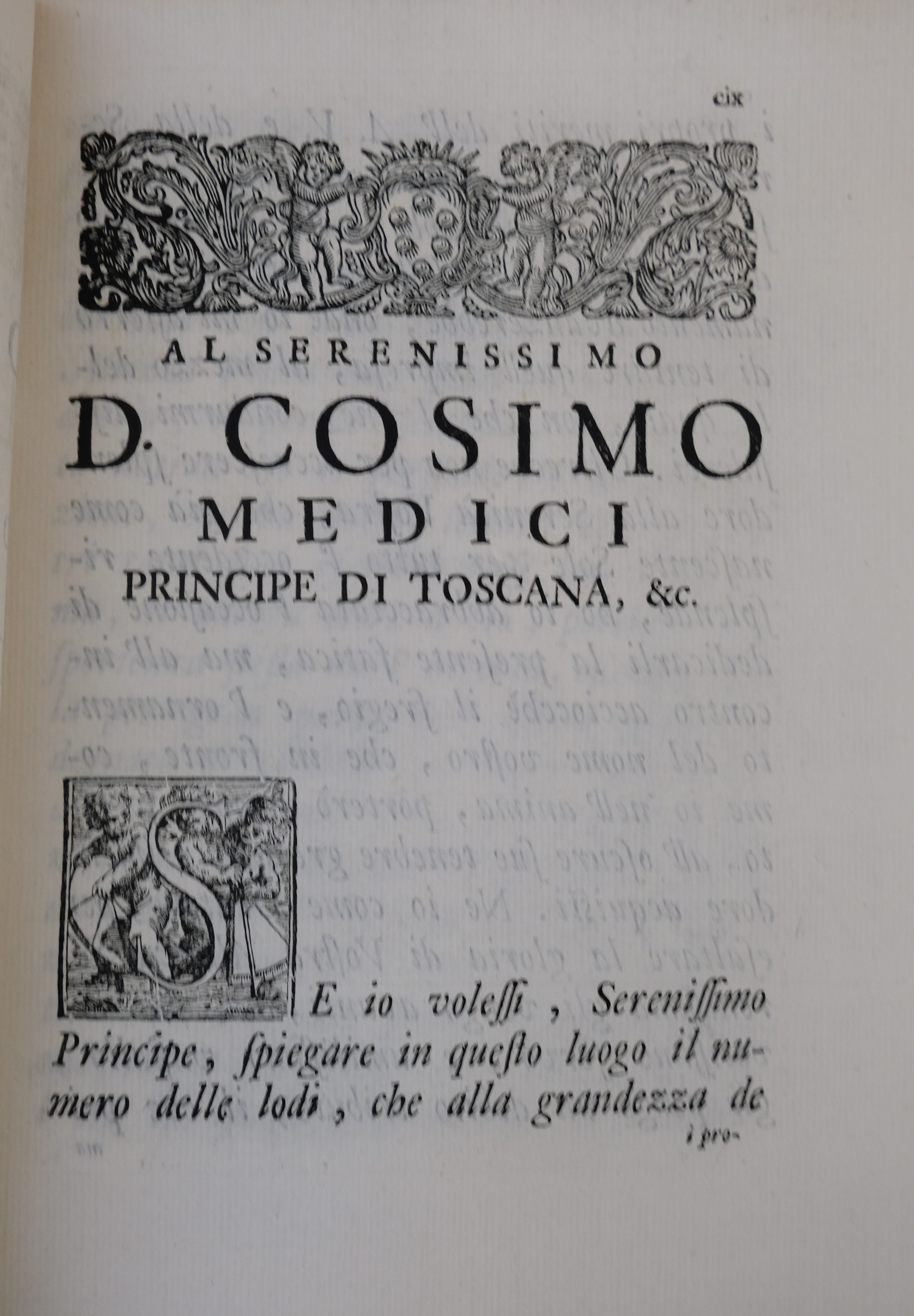
Dedication to Medici in volume I of "Opere di Galileo Galilei" (1718)

He died on 28 February 1621 from tuberculosis and was succeeded by his elder son, Ferdinando II, still a minor at the time of his father's death. The regency for the new grand duke was bestowed upon Cosimo II's wife and mother, as per his wishes.

== Patronage ==
=== Science ===
Galileo Galilei was named court mathematician to Cosimo in 1610, a post that freed Galileo from the constraints of teaching mathematics at universities. As court mathematician, Galileo was free to challenge the distinction between disciplines and advance theories of Nicolaus Copernicus by using mathematics to address questions of physics. The already famous Galileo had used his telescopic accomplishments in his bid for patronage. Once appointed, Galileo moved to the Florence court and found a resource rich environment where he worked as philosopher, mathematician and astronomer. Galileo was actively involved in court life and supported the dynastic rhetoric of the Medici family. Aside from producing intellectual spectacles, Galileo used the Medici court to advance his theoretical claims and discoveries. The four moons of Jupiter he had discovered were named Medicean Stars in reference to Cosimo and his three brothers. Tuscan ambassadors were used to advance scientific debate in Europe. Ambassadors in Prague, Paris, London and Madrid received copies of Galileo's Sidereus Nuncius and were sent telescopes constructed by Galileo, paid for by the court treasury.

=== Art ===
Notable artist Jacques Callot worked at the court of Grand Duke Cosimo II till the death of his patron in 1621. Callot visually documented feasts and carnivals in Florence.

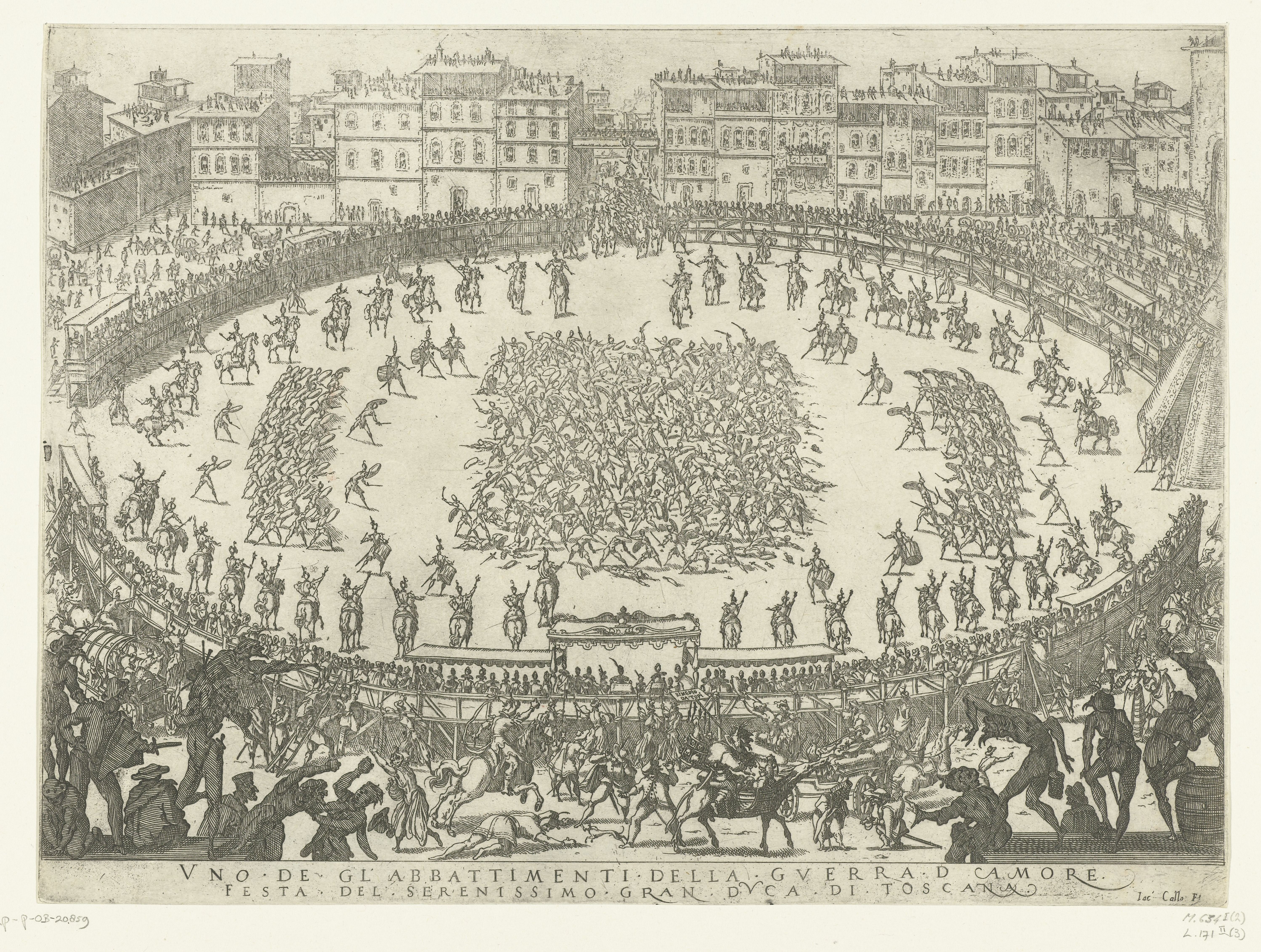
Carnaval te Florence infanteriegevecht, RP-P-OB-20.859

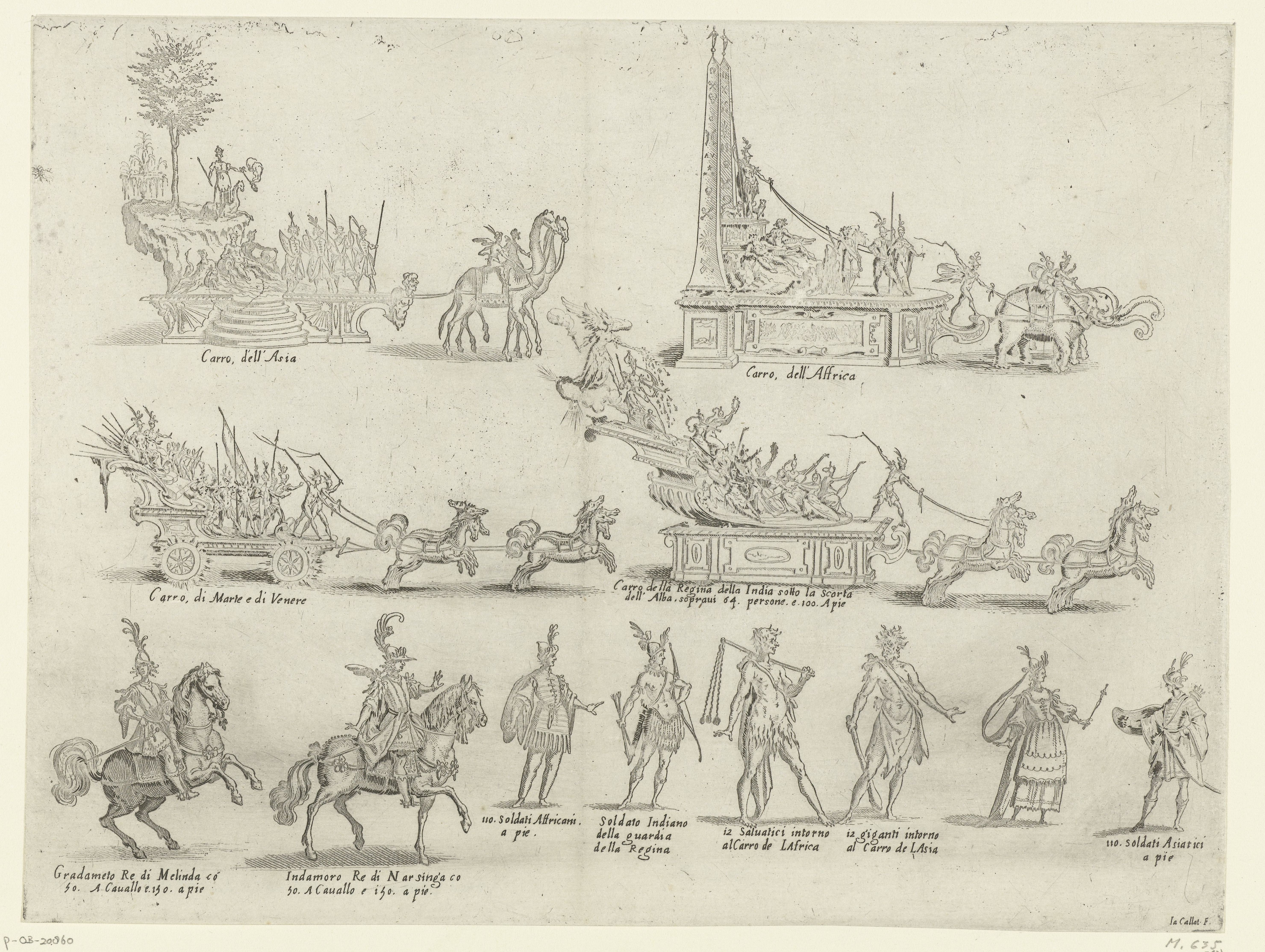
Carnaval te Florence praalwagens en deelnemers aan de optocht, RP-P-OB-20.860

== Issue ==
1. Maria Cristina de' Medici (24 August 1609 – 9 August 1632), died unmarried
2. Ferdinando II de' Medici, Grand Duke of Tuscany (14 July 1610 – 23 May 1670), who married Vittoria della Rovere and had issue
3. Gian Carlo de' Medici (24 July 1611 – 23 January 1663), died unmarried
4. Margherita de' Medici (31 May 1612 – 6 February 1679) married Odoardo Farnese, Duke of Parma, and had issue
5. Mattias de' Medici (9 May 1613 – 14 October 1667), died unmarried
6. Francesco de' Medici (16 October 1614 – 25 July 1634), died unmarried
7. Anna de' Medici (21 July 1616 – 11 September 1676), married Ferdinand Charles, Archduke of Austria (1628–1662) and had issue
8. Leopoldo de' Medici (6 November 1617 – 10 November 1675), died unmarried

== Ancestors ==
Ancestors of Cosimo II de' Medici

8. Ludovico di Giovanni de' Medici
4. Cosimo I de' Medici, Grand Duke of Tuscany
9. Maria Salviati
2. Ferdinando I de' Medici, Grand Duke of Tuscany
10. Pedro de Toledo y Zúñiga
5. Eleanor of Toledo
11. María Osorio y Pimentel
1. Cosimo II de' Medici
12. Francis I, Duke of Lorraine
6. Charles III, Duke of Lorraine
13. Christina of Denmark
3. Christina of Lorraine
14. Henry II of France
7. Claude of Valois
15. Catherine de' Medici

== Bibliography ==
- Strathern, Paul. The Medici: Godfathers of the Renaissance. Vintage books, London 2003, ISBN 978-0-09-952297-3
- Hale, J.R. Florence and the Medici. Orion books, London 1977, ISBN 1-84212-456-0

Cosimo II de' Medici House of Medici Born: 12 May 1590 Died: 28 February 1621
Regnal titles
Preceded by Ferdinando I de' Medici	Grand Duke of Tuscany; 1609–1621	Succeeded by Ferdinando II de' Medici
