= Margherita de' Medici =

Duchess of Parma and Piacenza from 1628 to 1646

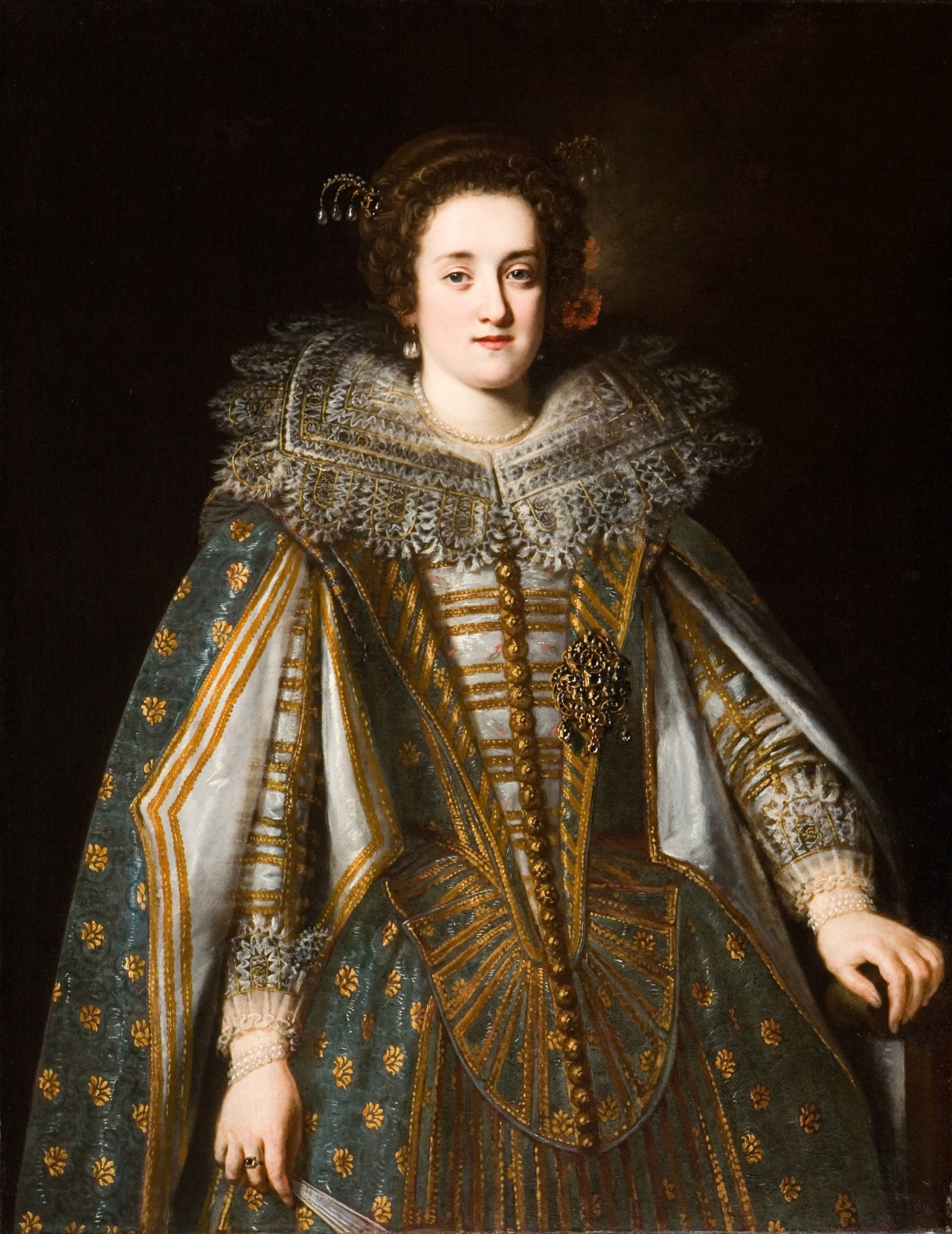
- Portrait by Justus Sustermans

Duchess consort of Parma and Piacenza
- Tenure: 11 October 1628 – 11 September 1646

Regent of Parma and Piacenza
- Regency: 1646–1648
- Co-Regent: Francesco Maria Farnese
- Born: 31 May 1612; Palazzo Pitti, Florence, Grand Duchy of Tuscany
- Died: 6 February 1679 (aged 66); Parma, Duchy of Parma and Piacenza
- Spouse: Odoardo Farnese, Duke of Parma (m. 1628; died 1646)
- Issue: Caterina Farnese; Ranuccio II, Duke of Parma; Maria Maddalena Farnese; Alessandro Farnese, Governor of the Habsburg Netherlands; Orazio Farnese; Caterina Farnese; Pietro Farnese; Ottavio Farnese
Names
- Margherita de' Medici
- House: Medici
- Father: Cosimo II de' Medici
- Mother: Maria Magdalena of Austria
- Religion: Roman Catholicism

Margherita de' Medici (31 May 1612 – 6 February 1679) was Duchess of Parma and Piacenza by her marriage to Odoardo Farnese, Duke of Parma. Margherita was regent of Piacenza in 1635, and regent of the entire duchy from 1646 until 1648 during the minority of her son.

== Life ==
She was the fourth of eight children and the second daughter born to Cosimo II de' Medici, Grand Duke of Tuscany and his wife Maria Magdalena of Austria. Hence Margherita was a descendant of the Holy Roman Emperors.

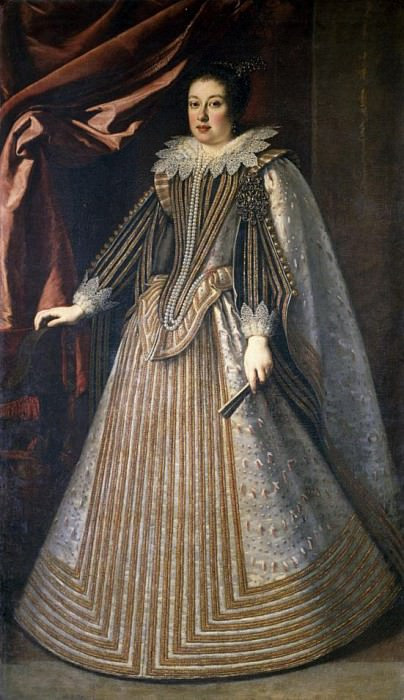
Portrait of Margherita by Sustermans

Margherita became engaged to Odoardo Farnese, Duke of Parma in 1620. They married in 1628 when he came of age. The marriage had been strongly desired by Odoardo's father, Ranuccio, who saw it as a means of strengthening the alliance between the Duchy of Parma and the Grand Duchy of Tuscany, then ruled by the Medici family.

=== Duchess of Parma ===
The marriage took place on 11 October 1628 in Florence. The wedding celebrations were accompanied by much spectacle and pageantry, including the performance of Marco da Gagliano's opera La Flora, composed especially for the occasion. To welcome the couple back to Parma, Mercury and Mars, with music by Claudio Monteverdi and text by Claudio Achillini was performed in the Teatro Farnese.

The years in which the couple ruled over Parma were marked by the plague of 1630 and the contrast between the splendour of the court and the tax burden to which they had subjected their subjects. The tax money was used to improve Odoardo's armies. The Duke also had a pro-French policy.

According to portraiture and the sources of the time, Margherita was a beautiful woman, as well as amiable and well-educated. Unlike his predecessors, the duke was very devoted and loyal to her and there were never any sources that claimed Odoardo had illegitimate children.

=== Regency ===
On 11 September 1646, Odoardo died. Their eldest son, Ranuccio was not yet old enough to rule the Duchy alone so his mother, Margherita acted as regent until her son was old enough to govern alone two years later. She served in co-regency with her former brother-in-law, her son‘s uncle, Francesco Maria Farnese. In 1648, her son was declared of legal majority and thus ended her regency.

Margherita outlived at least four of her children. She died in Parma on 6 February 1679.

== Issue ==
1. Caterina Farnese (2 October 1629) died at birth.
2. Ranuccio II Farnese (17 September 1630 – 11 December 1694) married (1) Margaret Yolande of Savoy, (2) Isabella d'Este, (3) Maria d'Este.
3. Alessandro Farnese (10 January 1635 – 18 February 1689), Governor of the Habsburg Netherlands died unmarried.
4. Onorato Farnese (24 January 1636 – 2 November 1656) died unmarried.
5. Caterina Farnese (3 September 1637 – 24 April 1684) a nun
6. Maria Maddalena Farnese (15 July 1638 – 11 March 1693) died unmarried.
7. Pietro Farnese (4 April 1639 – 4 March 1677) died unmarried.
8. Ottavio Farnese (5 January 1641 – 4 August 1641) died in infancy.

== Ancestry ==
Ancestors of Margherita de' Medici

8. Cosimo I de' Medici, Grand Duke of Tuscany
4. Ferdinando I de' Medici, Grand Duke of Tuscany
9. Eleonora di Toledo
2. Cosimo II de' Medici, Grand Duke of Tuscany
10. Charles III, Duke of Lorraine
5. Christina of Lorraine
11. Claude of Valois
1. Margherita de' Medici
12. Ferdinand I, Holy Roman Emperor
6. Charles II of Austria
13. Anna of Bohemia and Hungary
3. Maria Magdalena of Austria
14. Albert V, Duke of Bavaria
7. Maria Anna of Bavaria
15. Anna of Austria
