= Santa Teresa del Bambin Gesù =

Santa Teresa del Bambin Gesù (Italian for 'St. Therese of the Child Jesus') may refer to the following Roman Catholic churches in Italy:

- Santa Teresa del Bambin Gesù, Parma
- Santa Teresa del Bambin Gesù in Panfilo, Rome

== See also ==
- Santa Teresa di Gesù Bambino, Verona
- Santa Maria del Bambin Gesù, Parma
- Bambino Gesù (disambiguation)
