= Bambino Gesù =

Bambino Gesù or Bambin Gesù (Italian for 'Baby Jesus') may refer to:

- Bambino Gesù Hospital, a children's hospital in Rome, Italy
- Bambino Gesù di Praga, a Roman Catholic image in Arenzano, Italy
- Oblate Sisters of the Holy Child Jesus (Suore Oblate del Santo Bambino Gesù), a Roman Catholic religious order in Italy

== See also ==
- "Gesù bambino", an Italian Christmas carol
- Santa Teresa del Bambin Gesù, Roman Catholic churches in Italy
- Santa Teresa di Gesù Bambino, a Roman Catholic church in Verona, Italy
- Santa Maria del Bambin Gesù, a Roman Catholic church in Parma, Italy
