= History of the Duchy of Parma and Piacenza =

History of former Italian state

History of the Duchy of Parma and Piacenza Ducato di Parma e Piacenza
- Coat of arms
- Motto: Dirige me Domine Guide me, O Lord
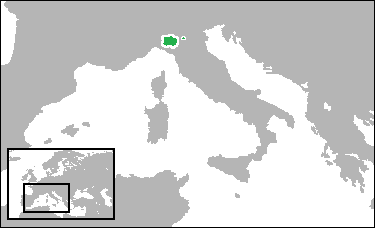
- Status: Monarchy
- Capital: Parma
- Official languages: Emilian dialects, Italian
- Religion: Catholic Church
- Currency: Écu (under Farnese), then Parman lira

The history of the Duchy of Parma and Piacenza, a former state on the Italian Peninsula whose capital was the city of Parma, begins in 1545 and ends in 1860.

The duchy was established due to nepotism practised by Pope Paul III and was initially governed by the Farnese family, to which the pontiff belonged. Despite the claims of France, Spain, and Austria, the duchy maintained its autonomy, particularly after the extinction of the Farnese in 1731, when a branch of the Spanish Bourbons, the Bourbon-Parma, assumed the throne.

The duchy's geographical location in the heart of the Po Valley made it susceptible to incursions by foreign armies, particularly during the succession wars of the 18th century. In 1796, it was occupied by the Italian Army, and in 1808, it was annexed to the First French Empire. Implementing French laws resulted in significant disruption to the country's traditions and transformation into the Taro department.

In 1815 the Congress of Vienna reinstated the Duchy of Parma and designated Marie Louise of Austria, the second wife of Napoleon I, as its ruler. She remains the most esteemed sovereign in the history of the Parmesans. She re-established the duchy's alignment with Austrian interests, a shift that extended to much of the Italian Peninsula. Following her death in 1847, the Bourbon-Parma returned to Parma. However, less than fifteen years later, in 1860, the unifying forces of the Risorgimento, which swept through Italy, led to the annexation of the duchy by the Kingdom of Sardinia, as evidenced by the results of a plebiscite.

== Farnese period (1545–1731) ==
=== Creation of the Duchy ===
Italian peninsula in 1494.

The Duchy of Parma originated from a significant portion of the Duchy of Milan, situated to the south of the Po River. On 22 September 1346, Lucien Visconti purchased Parma for 60,000 gold florins from the Marquis of Ferrara, Obizzo III d'Este, who had held Parma for two years since acquiring it from Azzo di Correggio.

In 1512, during the Congress of Mantua, the region of Parma was detached from the Duchy of Milan for the benefit of the Papal States. This was the first instance in which Italian princes were united against the French presence. Maximilian Sforza, the son of the deposed Duke of Milan, was compelled to concede nearly a quarter of the lands previously owned by his father in exchange for papal intervention.

In the aftermath of the French victory at Marignano in 1515, Francis I reclaimed the Duchy of Milan, restoring it to its original boundaries and effectively removing Parma from papal authority. In 1521, Pope Leo X and Charles V allied and expelled the French from Parma (and the entire Duchy of Milan). The city was besieged once more by the French and their Venetian allies in December, but the attempt was unsuccessful. In 1528, Charles V visited Parma and placed the city, along with Piacenza, under papal control. The Este family retained control of Reggio Emilia and Modena, which had formed the Duchy of Modena and Reggio since 1452.

During this period, the Farnese family achieved a prominent position within the political and social hierarchy of the time. In 1527 Pier Luigi Farnese, a condottiere serving Charles V, participated in the Sack of Rome with imperial troops while defending his family's properties and the Palazzo Farnese. His father, Cardinal Alessandro Farnese, was meanwhile positioned alongside Pope Clement VII, who was imprisoned in Castel Sant'Angelo. Alessandro participated in the subsequent lengthy negotiations in Bologna. In 1534, Clement VII died, and the conclave elected Alessandro as pope. He took the name Paul III and promptly engaged in nepotism by appointing two of his grandsons, Alessandro Farnese and Guido Ascanio Sforza di Santa Fiora, as cardinals.

The family's ascendance persisted with the marriage of Ottavio Farnese, son of Pier Luigi, to Margaret of Parma, the illegitimate daughter of Charles V and Jeanne van der Gheyst, in 1538. In 1543, Pope Paul III asserted the claim of the Duchy of Milan on behalf of Ottavio, but Charles V granted him the Marquessate of Novara. Despite opposition from prelates concerned about losing two important cities, the pope renewed his family's claim to Parma and Piacenza for Pier Luigi, as he had failed to secure the entirety of Milan. Subsequently, the pope appointed his son as Gonfalonier of the Church and established a new fiefdom, which was formally recognized by a papal bull dated 26 August 1545. Pier Luigi had to await the official investiture until 23 September and selected Piacenza as the capital due to its proximity to Milan, Genoa, and Piedmont.

=== Farnese consolidation ===
Pier Luigi undertook considerable diplomatic endeavours with the emperor to substantiate his appointment; however, Charles V remained undecided, opting to confer the title upon his son-in-law, Ottavio Farnese, whom Pier Luigi deemed too youthful. Venice, seeking support against France, was the inaugural state to acknowledge Pier Luigi.

During his tenure, Pier Luigi established a Supreme Council of Justice (Supremo Consiglio di Giustizia) and appointed a magistrate for the ducal chamber's revenues (Magistrato delle rendite della Camera Ducale). He undertook a comprehensive reorganization of the postal system, conducted a population census, and sought to curtail the privileges of the feudal system.

However, the longevity of his dynasty was not assured. In 1547, Pier Luigi was assassinated by the nobility of Piacenza, likely with the approval of the governor of Milan, Ferrante Gonzaga. The emperor, Ferrante Gonzaga, or the lords of Piacenza were potential candidates for involvement.

But Ottavio assumed control of Parma, whose lords had not participated in the conspiracy, and resisted Paul III's attempts to reclaim the duchy, thereby asserting his authority. He sought assistance from his father-in-law, Charles V, who was initially reluctant to recognize the duchy. Following the pope's death, his successor Julius III, who was closely aligned with the emperor, sought to offer the duchy to the House of Austria. With few remaining options, Ottavio sought support from France and secured a political agreement with Henry II of France.

Pope Julius III, incensed, issued a threat of excommunication, which Ottavio met with the proposal of establishing an independent Gallican Church. The War of Parma commenced in June 1551, with Gonzaga temporarily occupying parts of the duchy. However, Ottavio emerged triumphant with French support. Furthermore, the Pope, concerned about France's Gallican stance, acquiesced on the issue of Parma and restored diplomatic relations with the King of France. In 1556, the Treaty of Ghent saw Ottavio gain control of Piacenza from Charles V's successor, Philip II of Spain. However, in return for this, he was obliged to grant amnesty to the lords who had been responsible for his father's assassination. The 1559 Treaties of Cateau-Cambrésis subsequently confirmed his possession of these lands.

From an economic standpoint, Ottavio demonstrated a notable degree of frugality. Despite this, the duchy witnessed some significant developments during his reign, including the construction of the Farnese Palace in Piacenza and the Church of SS. Furthermore, he initiated the construction of the Annunziata in Codiponte and the Jesuit College. He proceeded with the policy of weakening the nobility, and in 1582, he issued a decree for confiscating the lands belonging to the Landi family, who had been lords of Piacenza and had participated in his father's assassination. This was justified on the grounds of another attempted regicide.

=== Three centuries of rule ===
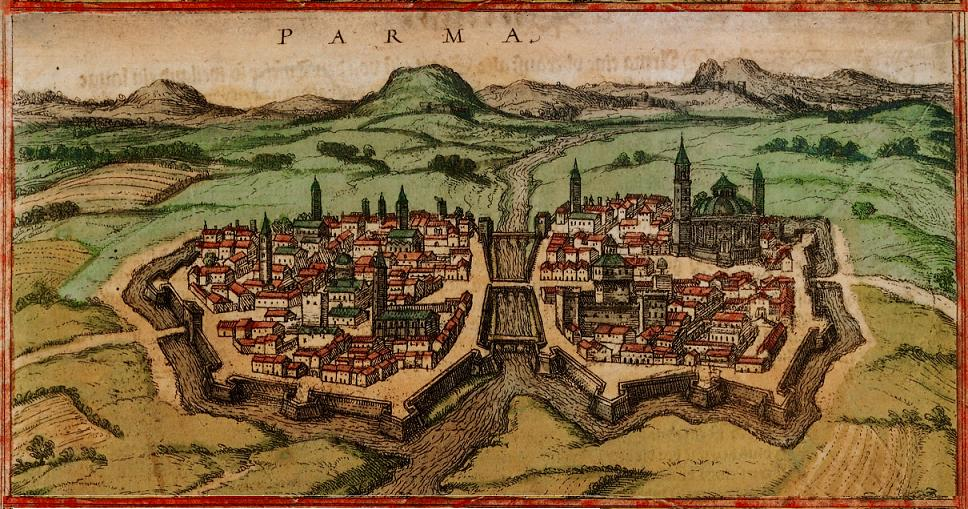
The city of Parma in the 16th century.

Upon the death of Ottavio in 1586, his son Alessandro, who held the rank of general in the army of King Philip II of Spain, ascended to the ducal throne. Alessandro was married to Infanta Maria of Portugal, granddaughter of King Manuel I in the male line. He had been raised at the Spanish court and was therefore unfamiliar with his capital. Serving his king, he remained distant from his duchy throughout his life. The future duke participated in the Battle of Lepanto in 1571 alongside Marcantonio Colonna and other battles against Muslims in the Balkans. His military actions resulted in his promotion to general commander during the Flemish War, and he also participated in the French Wars of Religion, where he died in 1592 from injuries sustained in battle.

Duke Ranuce I assumed the rule of the Duchy of Parma in 1580, following the death of his predecessor, King Alexander, who had laid claim to the Portuguese crown in 1578. This claim was based on the rights derived from Alexander's mother, Maria, who had died in 1577. Ranuce ruled the duchy with an iron fist for thirty years and was responsible for the economic and urban development of Parma through initiatives such as the construction of the theater at the Palazzo della Pilotta and the establishment of four fortified bastions. In 1599, he married Marguerite Aldobrandini, the niece of Pope Clement VIII. In 1611, he exposed a conspiracy against him and had numerous nobles arrested. A trial resulted in the condemnation of the conspirators to death and the confiscation of their property. The duke died in 1622 at the age of 52.

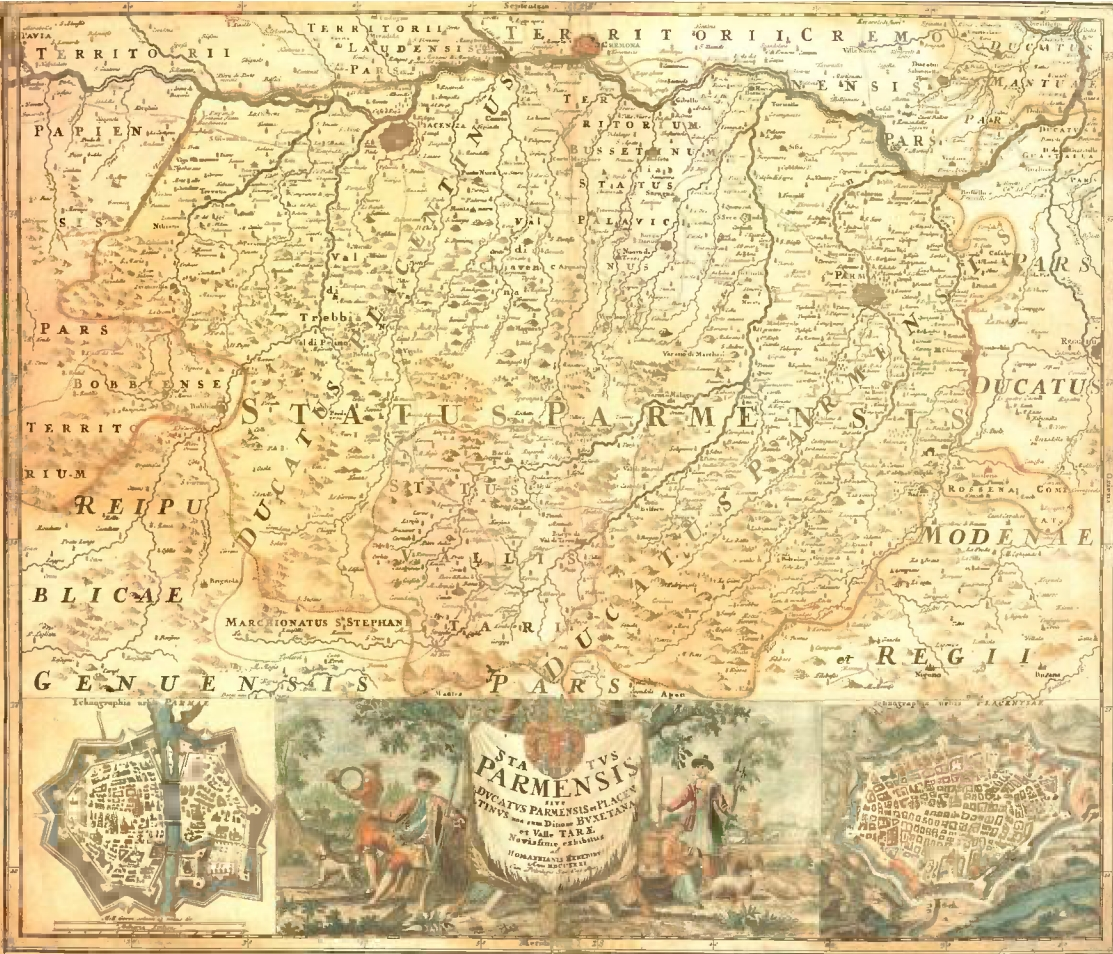
Map of the Duchy of Parma and Piacenza.

His son Odoardo, who was only ten years of age, succeeded him. The regency of the duchy was assumed by his mother, Marguerite Aldobrandini, and his uncle, Cardinal Odoardo Farnese. In 1628, Odoardo married Margherita de' Medici, the eldest daughter of Cosimo II, Grand Duke of Tuscany. He relocated his court closer to France under the influence of Jacopo Gaufrido, a French official in the employ of the Farnese family, who was suspected of acting on behalf of Richelieu. In 1636, Odoardo initiated hostilities with Spain, a venture that proved to be exceedingly challenging for him. The intervention of the Pope and the Grand Duke of Tuscany facilitated the conclusion of a peace treaty on 4 February 1637, which concluded the conflict and secured the future of the duchy. He was compelled to disavow his alliance with France and reestablish diplomatic relations with Madrid. As a consequence of the financial obligations incurred through the Monti Farnesiani loans, the duchy of Castro was pledged as collateral. In 1641, the failure to repay the debt and his refusal to cede the duchy of Castro to the Barberini family, his primary creditors, resulted in the initial War of Castro against Pope Urban VIII, who was also a member of the Barberini family. In 1644, the intervention of Cardinal Mazarin's France facilitated the conclusion of peace between the two belligerents through the Treaty of Venice, signed on 31 March. This treaty confirmed the retention of Castro within Farnese hands. Édouard died in 1646.

His son Ranuce II, then sixteen years of age, ascended to the throne in his father's stead. During his reign, in 1659, the Farnese permanently lost Castro after a second war against Pope Innocent X. Ranuce II entered into three marriages. His first marriage was to Margaret Yolande of Savoy in 1660, who died three years later. He intended to regain Castro through this marriage. He subsequently entered into matrimony with Isabella d'Este on two further occasions, and with Maria d'Este on one additional occasion. Ranuce pursued a policy of maintaining equilibrium between France and Spain and expanded the duchy by acquiring the territories of Bardi and Compiano. These, being former imperial fiefs, aroused Austria's ambitions, leading to its invasion in 1691. An occupying force settled at the duchy's expense. Ranuce died in 1694, a year after his son Odoardo II, who was supposed to succeed him.

Francesco Farnese, brother of the late Édouard, assumed the ruler role following Ranuce II's death and entered into a marital union with his brother's widow, Dorothea Sophie of Neuburg. François then implemented a punitive fiscal policy, imposing significant financial burdens on the population. He also levied contributions from the clergy, who had previously been exempt, to raise the ransom demanded by the Austrians for their departure from the occupied territories. The duchy, like the rest of northern Italy, became a theater of war during the War of Spanish Succession. The duke attempted to maintain neutrality, although he did dispatch Giulio Alberoni to the Duke of Vendôme. Following the French defeat at Turin in 1706, the Austrians once again occupied Parma. François arranged the marriage between his niece Elisabeth, daughter of Odoardo II, and King Philip V of Spain, at the instigation of Alberoni. After the duke's sudden death in 1727, the duchy came under the regency of his brother, Antoine.

During his four-year tenure, Antoine sought to maintain the authority of the Imperialists and the papacy, implementing only a limited number of reforms. He married Enrichetta d'Este in 1728 but died three years later without leaving an heir. Consequently, the male line of the Farnese family became extinct. On 29 December, the Parmesan nobility swore allegiance to the new duke, the infant Charles of Bourbon, son of Philip V and Elisabeth Farnese.

== First Bourbons and foreign domination (1731–1802) ==
=== Turbulent succession between Spain and Austria ===
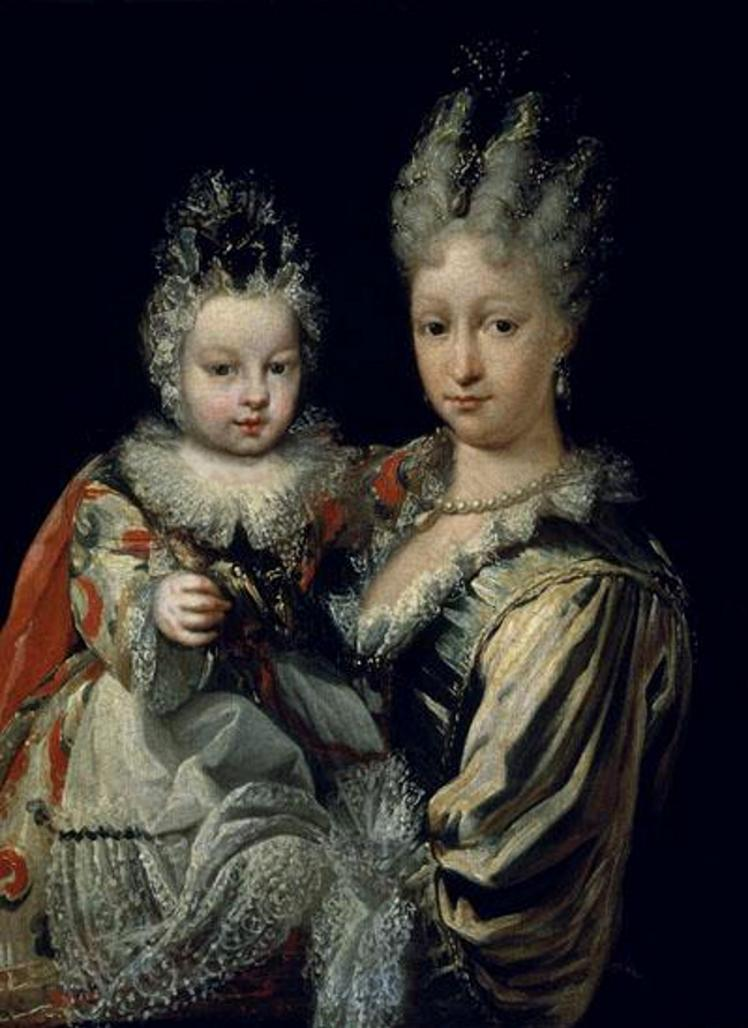
Elisabeth Farnese and her eldest son Charles de Bourbon in 1716.

Following the marriage of Elisabeth Farnese, the niece of the last Duke of Parma, to King Philip V of Spain in 1715, the Treaty of London of 1718 stipulated that the duchy should be passed to the children of the Bourbon house of Spain born from Elisabeth's marriage. Consequently, her mother, Dorothea Sophie, was designated as regent until the arrival of Charles of Bourbon. Subsequently, he was crowned Duke of Parma as Charles I before conquering the throne of Naples in 1734, following battles with Austrian troops. With the conclusion of the War of Polish Succession, as formalized by the Treaty of Vienna in 1738, the Duchy of Parma and Piacenza was returned to the Austrian Habsburgs, who administered it until 1745. This period saw the authority of Charles VI and subsequently that of Maria Theresa. Meanwhile, Charles had departed for his new kingdom of Naples, taking with him a considerable quantity of artistic works and archives of Parma.

In 1740, the War of Austrian Succession saw Austrian and Piedmontese troops engage in combat with Spanish troops, in which the infant Philip of Spain was involved. Piacenza was captured by Charles Emmanuel III of Sardinia, and the remainder of the duchy was incorporated into Austrian Milan. On 15 September 1745, Spanish troops, having previously occupied Piacenza, proceeded to enter Parma. It was Lieutenant-General the Marquis of Castellar who received the act of obedience from the Parmesans to Elisabeth Farnese on 22 October 1745. Subsequently, the Austrians dispatched 70,000 troops to Italy, under the command of General Braun. Meanwhile, General Gian Luca Pallavicini laid siege to Parma. The Spaniards managed to evade the Austrians' vigilance and withdrew from the city, leaving the population to its fate. Parma was sacked and returned to Austria, while Piacenza was ceded to the House of Savoy.

=== Stability ===
Bourbon-Parme coat of arms.

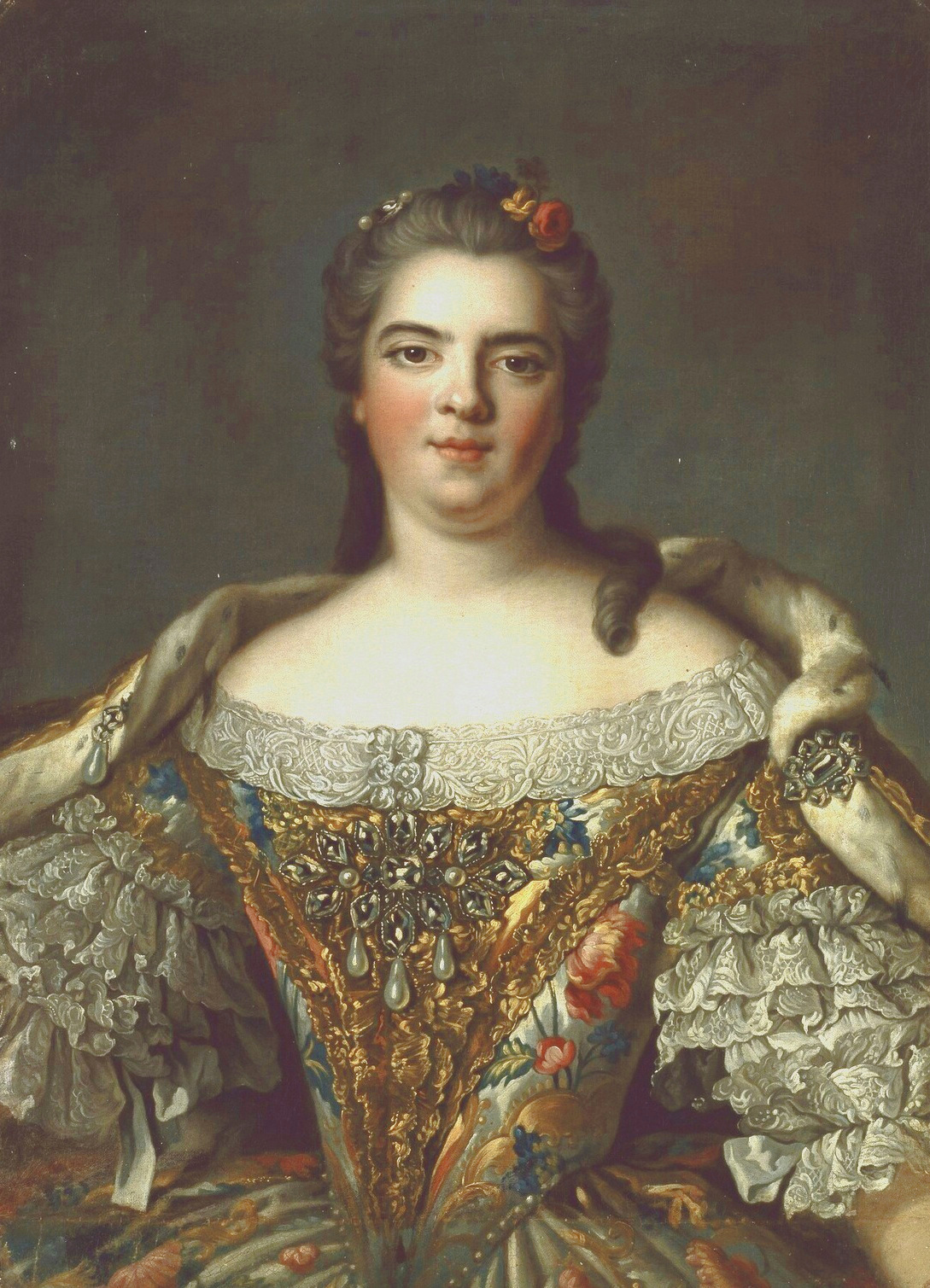
Portrait of Louise-Elisabeth of France, Duchess of Parma, circa 1740–1750, Nattier workshop, Palace of Versailles

On 18 November 1748, with the signing of the Treaty of Aix-la-Chapelle, which brought the War of Austrian Succession to a close, the Farnese duchies and the Duchy of Guastalla, which had become extinct with the death of the Gonzaga dynasty, were placed under the protection of the Empire, with France and Spain acting as their tutelary powers. The infant Philip, who had been married since 26 August 1739, to Elisabeth of France, daughter of King Louis XV and Marie Leszczyńska (who was twelve years old at the time), ascended to the dukedom of Parma, Piacenza, and Guastalla. He entered Parma in July 1749.

Duke Philip implemented an enlightened, expansive, and Jansenist policy, which was supported from 1759 onwards by his Prime Minister, the Frenchman Guillaume du Tillot. He initiated reforms that improved financial management, reinforced state authority, and established public schools. In 1768, Du Tillot issued an edict that resulted in the expulsion of the Jesuits, the seizure of Roman Catholic Church properties, and the dissolution of ecclesiastical courts.

Notable figures were drawn to Parma, including the philosopher Condillac, who served as a tutor to the crown prince Ferdinand, and the mathematician Auguste de Keralio, who served as his governor from 1757 to 1769. Whether by choice or otherwise, progressive ideas began to take hold. Condillac instructed the young prince in the tenets of sensualism, a highly contentious philosophical doctrine that was the subject of considerable debate in Europe at the time. Keralio, meanwhile, served as an intermediary facilitating interactions between the French encyclopedic scholars D'Alembert, Condorcet, and Bossut and the Milanese philosophers Cesare Beccaria, Pietro Verri, and Paolo Frisi. The duchy attracted artists such as the sculptor Boudard and the architect Ennemond Alexandre Petitot, who contributed to enhance Parma through his urban designs, including Stradone and the casino that bears his name. In 1771, Goya was awarded the second prize for painting by the Academy of Parma.

Despite the duchy's status as a French protectorate, it initiated diplomatic ties with the Empire. This resulted in the 1760 marriage of Marie-Isabelle, daughter of Duke Philip, to Archduke Joseph, who later ascended to the imperial throne as Joseph II. Marie-Isabelle died three years later, in 1763.

=== New marital arrangements ===
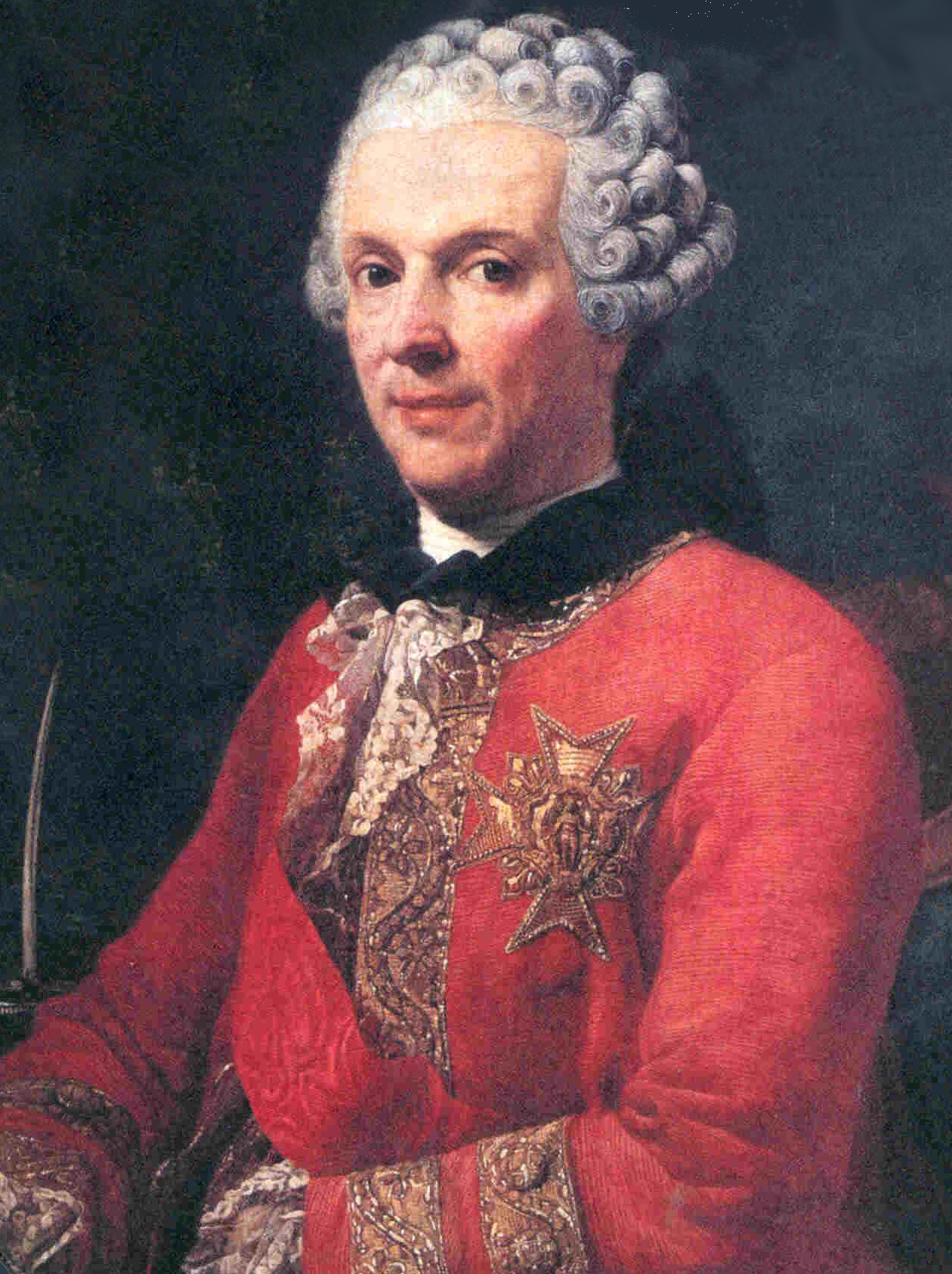
Guillaume du Tillot was Prime Minister of the Duchy from 1759 to 1771.

Following the death of Philip in 1765, his son Ferdinand I assumed the throne. France and Spain employed all available means to facilitate Ferdinand's marriage. Guillaume du Tillot, who remained Prime Minister, indicated his preference for Maria Beatrice d'Este, daughter of Duke Hercule III of Modena. He proposed that, following the latter's death, the two duchies would be united under Ferdinand's rule. The Duke of Choiseul, for his part, proposed Mademoiselle, the Princess of Orléans, who was particularly wealthy, but Spain rejected this proposal. Meanwhile, Emperor Joseph II postulated that the duchy would revert to Austria if Ferdinand remained without an heir.

As France and Spain remained undecided, the Viennese court sought to ascertain the opinions of all relevant parties and proposed Archduchess Maria Amalia, daughter of Empress Maria Theresa of Austria and sister of Marie Antoinette, as the wife of the French dauphin Louis-Auguste (the future Louis XVI). On 21 June 1769, Ferdinand, then 19 years of age, requested the hand of Maria Amalia, who was 23, after obtaining the requisite papal dispensation due to their close kinship. The marriage was solemnized by proxy in Vienna on 27 June 1769. On 1 July 1769, Maria Amalia departed from Austria, reaching Mantua on 16 July accompanied by her brother, Emperor Joseph II. Ferdinand proceeded to meet them, accompanied by Duke Sforza-Cesarini and Duke Grillo. During a ceremony held on 19 July in the Palazzo Ducale in Colorno, the bishop confirmed the marriage. Subsequent festivities and spectacles were held. The ducal couple arrived in Parma on the morning of the 24th.

Since 1759, the duchy had been effectively governed by Guillaume du Tillot, installed by France. Upon her arrival, Maria Amalia sought to replace French and Spanish influence with that of Austria. She openly opposed the Prime Minister and was successful in persuading her husband to dismiss him, despite opposition from France and Spain. The two powers sent the Spaniard José Augustin de Llano as minister, with explicit instructions to rectify the chronic financial deficiencies of the duchy, which had been exacerbated by the profligate lifestyle of the ducal couple. José Augustin de Llano, who was poorly received, was dismissed in October 1772. He was replaced by Italians Giuseppe Sacco and Lorenzo Pompeo Canossa, who continued the policy of enlightened despotism but with a national character, thereby ending Spanish influence in the duchy.

== French period ==
=== Turbulence of the revolutionary wars ===
The upheavals of the French Revolution and the specter of war compelled Ferdinand to proclaim neutrality, although he clandestinely allied with Austria on 13 May 1794. In 1796, Bonaparte was appointed to command the Italian Army, which entered Piacenza on 7 May and secured an armistice on 9 May. Ferdinand was unable to meet the French demands, which included the payment of two million francs, the provision of 1,200 draft horses, 400 for the dragoons, 100 saddles for officers, 1,000 tons of wheat, 500 of oats, 2,000 oxen, and 5,000 pairs of shoes. Consequently, Parma was occupied on 20 June, yet the duke retained his authority. His circumstances were challenging due to the Jacobins in Lombardy and Reggio Emilia, who regarded the perpetuation of the duchy as a provocation to the republican ethos. The duchy held a pivotal position in diplomatic relations between France and Spain, with the latter perceiving itself as the custodian of the duchy due to the duke's lineage.

With the resumption of conflict between France and Austria, which resulted in a French victory at Marengo in 1800, the duchy, despite its neutral status, was subjected to a continuous influx of troops. As a result of diplomatic negotiations between France and Spain, Parma was transferred to French control, allowing them to occupy the entire Po plain in exchange for the Grand Duchy of Tuscany. These agreements were formalized in February 1801 through the Treaty of Lunéville, which was subsequently followed by the Treaty of Aranjuez. Tuscany was assigned to Duke Ferdinand, who declined to relinquish his authority in Parma. Consequently, the two states established the Kingdom of Etruria, which they bestowed upon Ferdinand's son, Louis of Bourbon. Ferdinand was permitted to remain in Parma until his death and was placed under French surveillance by Moreau de Saint-Méry.

In his final moments, Ferdinand designated his son, Louis, as the heir to the Duchy of Parma, appointing Count Francesco Schizzati and Marquis Cesare Ventura as regents. He died with the possibility of poisoning being a contributing factor. The regency, however, was short-lived, lasting only a few days before Moreau de Saint- Méry assumed control of the duchy on behalf of France.

=== Napoleonic period (1802–1814) ===
In the wake of Ferdinand's death, Moreau de Saint- Méry ascended to the role of general delegate administrator of the Parmesan States, assuming control of the duchy in his capacity as the designated administrator. Through a series of administrative acts, he implemented significant innovations in law, including the abolition of anti-Jewish legislation, the prohibition of torture, and the complete separation of civil and criminal law. He also reformed the judicial system by introducing new laws, some of which were derived from new French legislation. On 3 June 1805, the legal reforms he had instituted were replaced by the introduction of the Napoleonic Code throughout the Empire.

Napoleon I made a brief visit to Parma on 27 June 1805, during which he stayed with Count Stefano Sanvitale, a prominent figure within the local government.

The growing discontent among the populace, which was linked to the implementation of increased taxes (such as the tax on doors and windows) and the military conscription of 12,000 men on 16 June, reached its zenith in 1806 with the peasant revolt of Castel San Giovanni. Subsequently, this revolt escalated into a confrontation with French soldiers in Bardi and Borgotaro. Napoleon perceived these occurrences as evidence of Moreau's inadequacy in managing the situation, particularly given the discrepancy between his administration's performance and the expectations of Parisians, and the perceived inadequacy of Parma's contribution. On 28 January 1806, Napoleon recalled Moreau and replaced him with General Junot, who was appointed governor-general, along with the administrator-prefect Hugues Nardon, who had previously administered the Montenotte department. The Piedmontese Jean-Baptiste De Gubernatis, a diligent official and amateur painter, was appointed as sub-prefect. Junot arrived with orders for severe repression, including the burning of five or six villages and the shooting of approximately sixty individuals. Despite the intervention of a delegation composed of Giacomo Tommaini, Luigi Torrigiani, and Filippo Luigi Linati with the Viceroy of Italy, Eugène de Beauharnais, twenty-one executions were carried out. Junot left his post in July 1806, having been recalled to Paris to take up the post of military governor. He was replaced by Marshal Pérignon.

In 1806, Nardon enacted a decree that divided the territory into thirteen town halls in accordance with the tenets of French communal law. Furthermore, public acts were to be drafted in French. Count Sanvitale was appointed mayor of Parma. By 1808, the two duchies constituted the 111th French Department of Taro, which sent six deputies to the legislative body, including Cardinal Charles François Caselli. On 24 April 1808, Jean-Jacques-Régis de Cambacérès was designated Prince of the Empire and Duke of Parma, while Piacenza was allotted to Charles-François Lebrun. These titles did not bestow upon them any authority over the territories that constituted the former Duchy of Parma and Piacenza. From August 1810 to 1814, Baron Dupont-Delporte administered the department as prefect. His tenure is viewed with a certain degree of ambivalence: economically prosperous, he promoted tobacco and sugar cultivation, silk production, and the revitalization of industry. Conversely, he closed the university and downgraded the Academy of Fine Arts.

Following Napoleon's defeat at the Battle of Leipzig in 1813, Austrian troops, aided by Neapolitan forces under Murat and led by General Nugent, advanced from Modena and entered Parma on 13 February 1814. The French forces, under the command of General Pierre Guillaume Gratien, retreated to Piacenza and subsequently regained the upper hand. The Starhemberg brigade elected to establish a defensive position along the Taro. On 2 March, the French forces were successful in recapturing Parma for a brief period of one week. However, the coalition forces were able to regain control of the city permanently, forming a provisional regency with Marquis Cesare Ventura, Prince Casimiro Meli Lupi di Soragna, and Count Filippo Magawly as leaders. The Parmesans were pleased with the arrival of the Allies due to the taxes and levies imposed by France.

On 9 March, the front stabilized on the Taro. Nugent's division comprised 6,000 men and 14 cannons, while Carrasco's Neapolitan forces numbered 100,000 and included two British divisions of 1,700 men. The French forces, under the command of Antoine Louis Popon, were positioned in Borgo San Donnino (present-day Fidenza), with 9,800 troops and 10 cannons. On 24 March, Pope Pius VII arrived in Borgo San Donnino from Paris, having been permitted by Napoleon to return to Rome. He was transferred to Austrian custody and made a stop in Parma at the ducal palace before departing on 27 March. On the night of 12–13 April, the Austrians advanced toward the Taro and secured a decisive victory due to their numerical superiority. The French retreated to the Val Nure, and the final confrontation in Piacenza was avoided due to Napoleon's abdication.

From the Napoleonic period onward, Parma retained several key infrastructural developments. These included the partial realization of a cadaster, the expansion of the Via Emilia, which connected it to the Paris-Naples route and was elevated to the rank of imperial road, as well as the construction of a 142-kilometer road linking Parma to La Spezia.

== Restoration ==
=== Marie-Louise, "the good duchess" (1814–1847) ===
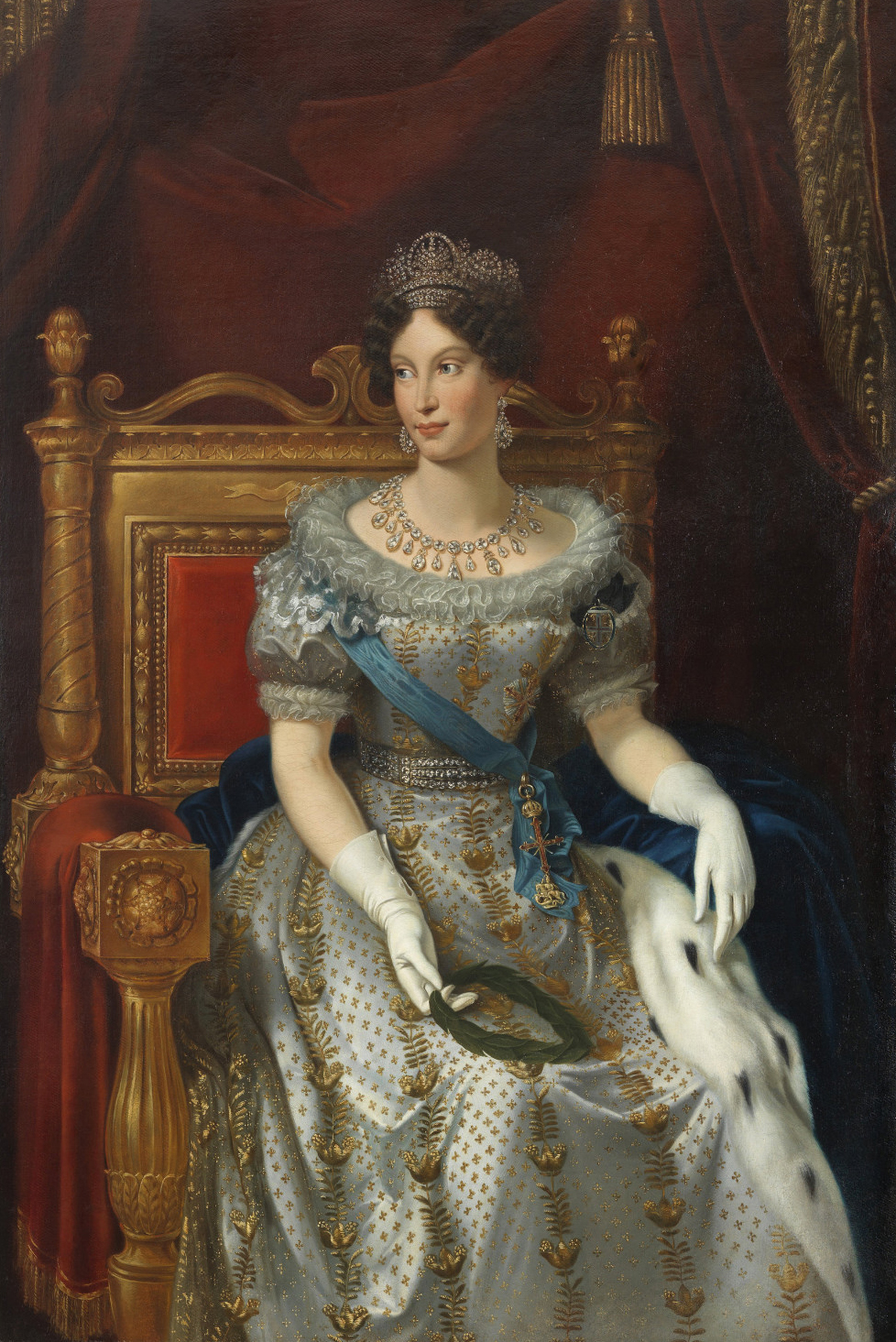
Portrait of Marie-Louise, Duchess of Parma, by Giovan Battista Borghesi (1839).

Arms of Marie-Louise, Duchess of Parma.

Article 5 of the Treaty of Fontainebleau, which was signed on 11 April 1814, states the following: "The Duchies of Parma, Piacenza, and Guastalla shall henceforth be held in full ownership and sovereignty by Her Majesty the Empress Marie-Louise. Such holdings will subsequently pass to her son and his direct descendants. The prince, her son, will henceforth be designated as Prince of Parma, Piacenza, and Guastalla." The Congress of Vienna, convened on 9 June 1815, reaffirmed the allocation of the duchies to Marie-Louise. However, it withdrew succession rights from her son, the Duke of Reichstadt, in favor of the Bourbon-Parma family, who were temporarily installed as rulers of a new Duchy of Lucca. The Treaty of Paris, dated 10 June 1817, confirmed these provisions.

On 31 March 1815, during the Hundred Days, Marie-Louise, from Schönbrunn Castle, requested that the subjects of the duchy pledge obedience to her father, Emperor Francis II, so that he could temporarily administer the duchy. On March 7, 1816, the emperor proclaimed his intention to reinstate the mandate to his daughter Marie-Louise. At last, prepared to assume governance of her territories, the 25-year-old Marie-Louise entered Parma on 9 April. Accompanied by Count Adam Albert von Neipperg, her minister and romantic partner, she would go on to have four children with him.

Neipperg assumed responsibility for foreign and military affairs, while Minister Magawly Cerati supervised civil and judicial administration. During this period, the Academy of Fine Arts was reestablished, churches were reopened, and the College of Nobles, which had been merged with the Lalatta College, became the Marie-Louise College. The University Palace was placed under the authority of the Jesuits. Due to political machinations within the court, Magawly Cerati was compelled to resign on 27 December 1816, and the duchess dissolved his ministry. Neipperg then assumed control of all governmental functions.

In 1817, the Austrian government in Vienna informed Neipperg of secret organizations in Switzerland that originated from the Duchy of Modena. These organizations were named the Unitari, Guelfi, and Carbonari. However, Neipperg expressed skepticism about the veracity of this information, citing the peaceful nature of the Duchy of Modena as a rationale for his doubt. Between 1819 and 1820, the Sublimi Maestri Perfetti and the Carbonari emerged, attempting to organize an uprising in the wake of the movements of 1820–1821. In response to pressure from Vienna, Marie-Louise was compelled to establish a commission of civilians and military officers to adjudicate the Carbonari with fairness and leniency. The two death sentences that had been handed down were subsequently commuted to terms of forced labor.

On 22 February 1829, Count Neipperg, who had reached the age of fifty-four, died. For thirteen years, he had prudently administered the duchy on behalf of Marie-Louise. Austria replaced him with Baron Josef von Werklein, who had served as Secretary of State since 1820.

In the following year, the July Revolution in France served to further fuel liberal sentiments. In 1831, following a popular uprising in the Duchy of Modena that spread to Bologna in the Papal States, the duchy's population rose up in revolt. While expressing admiration for the duchess, they demanded to establish a constitution and remove Werklein from power. Despite implementing strict measures, Werklein was unable to gain the support of Metternich, who held no affinity for him. Facing a threat to his life, Werklein fled Parma, and Marie-Louise sought refuge in Piacenza, concerned about the growing hostility toward Austria. On 15 February, a provisional government was established, and on 25 February, hostilities commenced in Fiorenzuola, situated near Piacenza. This confrontation involved an Austrian battalion comprising 500 soldiers and a column of 170 insurgents, the majority of whom were students. On 10 March, Austrian troops advanced on Parma, and the government submitted to Marie-Louise, who revoked all the measures taken by the provisional government. Between June and July 1831, members of the provisional government were tried, with most receiving amnesty. On 8 August, Marie-Louise returned to Parma in a freezing atmosphere.

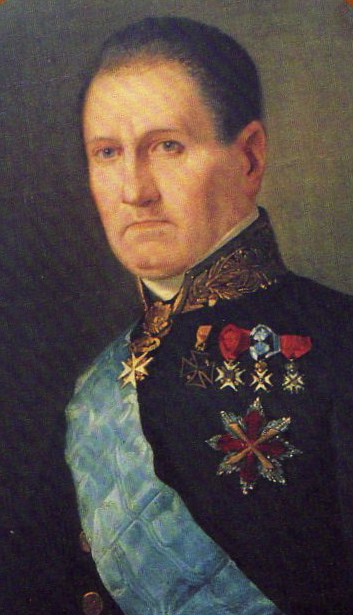
Charles-René de Bombelles.

Baron Marschall, initially designated as an extraordinary plenipotentiary, assumed the role previously held by Werklein. In November 1832, he submitted his resignation, citing the impossibility of achieving the financial reforms he had been tasked with. Furthermore, the duchy supported Austrian troops, a cost that Vienna was unwilling to reduce. Count Charles-René de Bombelles, appointed by Metternich, succeeded him as Prime Minister. Bombelles' administration was prudent, and indeed, Austria, through him, maintained a watch over the duchy to prevent the resurgence of liberalism, which had been suppressed in 1831. He entered into a morganatic marriage with Marie-Louise on 17 February 1834.

The final revolutionary episode occurred while Marie-Louise was convalescing in Meidlingen, situated close to Vienna, accompanied by Count Bombelles. On 16 June 1847, as students and professors celebrated the anniversary of the election of reformist Pope Pius IX, some assailants attacked the palace of Bishop Neuschel, whom they held responsible for his foreign nationality. The army intervened, and the revolt spread. Count Bombelles returned to Parma, where he dismissed and imprisoned all high-ranking officials considered liberal. Marie-Louise returned to Parma without having fully recovered, and she lingered for a month before dying on 17 December 1847.

From this period, the memory of a duchess who was beloved by all remains. She was responsible for renewing urban planning in Parma, thereby elevating the city to the status of a neoclassical capital. Her contributions to the city include the construction of a bridge over the Taro, the Villetta cemetery, the Teatro Regio, which was inaugurated on 16 May 1829, with Bellini's Zaira, a work commissioned for the occasion, the transformation of the Pilotta and Ducal Palace, the Beccherie, and the Ducal Library.

=== Return of the Bourbons (1847–1859) ===
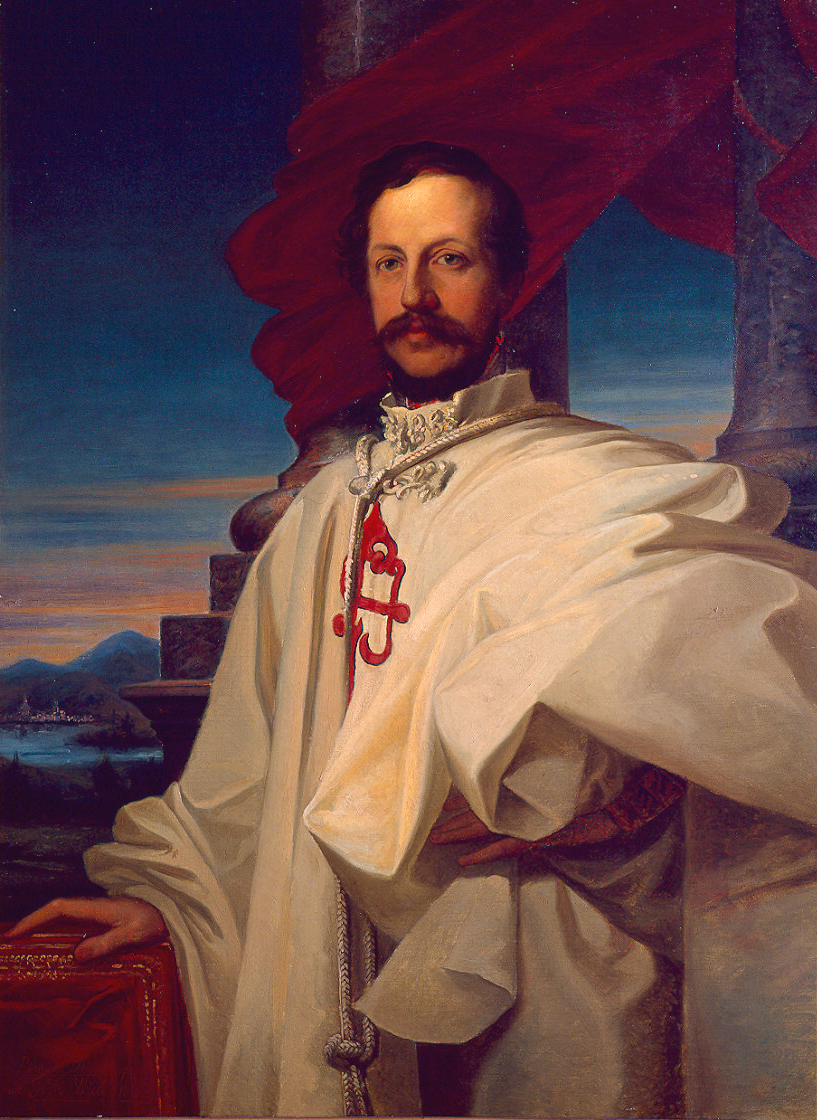
Duke Charles II in Order of Santiago habit.

In accordance with the terms of the Treaty of Paris, the duchy was returned to the House of Bourbon-Parma upon the death of Marie-Louise. The head of the family at the time was Charles-Louis, son of the former King Louis I of Etruria, who had been Duke of Lucca since 1824. However, the situation was not straightforward. Baron Philipp von Neumann, an advisor to the emperor who had been sent from Vienna to Parma, informed Metternich that, following the death of the duchess, liberals had attempted to stage an insurrection. Count Cantelli, the Podestà of Parma, was dismissed for attempting to form a provisional government before the arrival of the new duke.

On 31 December 1847, Bombelles apprised Metternich of the clandestine arrival of the newly appointed Duke Charles II, accompanied by his son. Charles II was revealed to be a weak and vile ruler, fostering a climate of suspicion and distrust. He pledged to the Viennese that he would oppose the liberals and promised them a constitution that he ultimately did not grant. As early as 1844, while Marie-Louise was still the Duchess of Parma, he had negotiated the cession of Guastalla to the Duke of Modena through the secret Treaty of Florence. In return, he received substantial financial compensation from the Grand Duchy of Tuscany, including the city of Pontremoli. The cession took place in January 1848.

In the early months of 1848, the outbreak of an insurrection in Milan impacted on the political landscape of Parma, leading to the eruption of a revolt on 20 March of that year. The inhabitants assembled with arms and tricolour cockades. A gunshot initiated the insurrection, resulting in fatalities and injuries. The duke's son initiated a repressive action, while Charles II, concerned by the magnitude of the rebellion, ordered a ceasefire and appealed to the populace to "await the wise decisions of their Father and Sovereign", promising a constitution.

The popular revolt compelled Charles II to defer the defensive alliance treaty with Austria and instead form an alliance with Leopold II of Tuscany, Pius IX, and Charles Albert of Sardinia, who were then engaged in the First Italian War of Independence. He subsequently reconsidered his position and abdicated in April, appointing a regency composed of liberals with the mandate of drafting a constitution. The members of the provisional government included Counts Giromola Cantelli and Luigi Sanvitale, lawyers Ferdinando Maestri and Pietri Gioia, and Professor Pietro Pellegrini. Charles II subsequently chose to leave the duchy, taking refuge in Weistropp, Saxony, on 8 April. The crown prince, who had been appointed major general by his father, fled to join Charles Albert but was imprisoned in Cremona and held for several months in Milan.

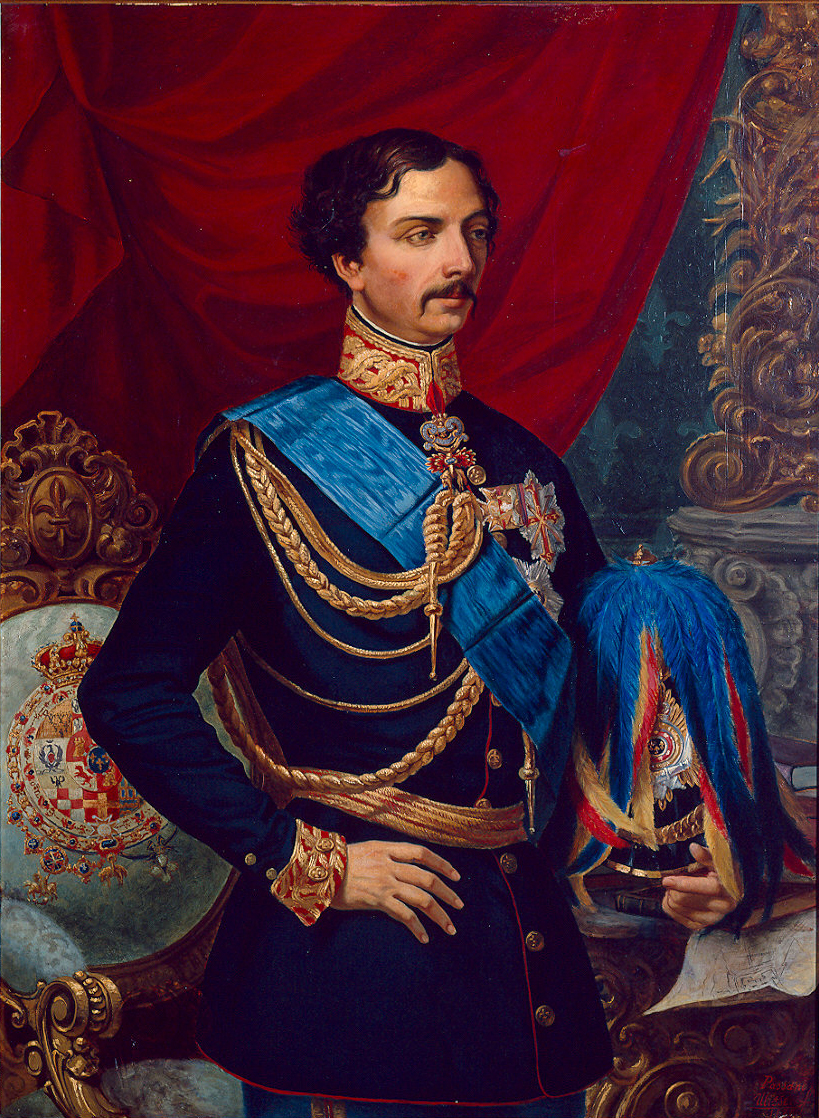
Duke Charles III.

The unification movement that was sweeping across the peninsula, accompanied by the victories of Piedmont, prompted the central states to pursue unification. On 10 and 17 May 1848, respectively, the cities of Piacenza and Parma petitioned the Kingdom of Sardinia for annexation through the medium of a plebiscite. On 16 June, the Sardinian commissioner assumed control of the duchy. However, as a consequence of the Piedmontese defeat and their inability to overcome Austrian forces, resulting in their surrender on 9 August, Austrian troops once again advanced towards Parma. On 18 August, Marshal Count de Thurn established a provisional military government, which Charles II approved from his Saxon exile. Gian Battista Niccolosi assumed responsibility for the Interior and Justice departments, while Antonio Lomnardini was charged with the management of Finance and Public Works. All legislation enacted by the provisional government was annulled. The coexistence between the occupying forces and the population became increasingly challenging, leading to the proclamation of martial law and the implementation of stringent measures, including the death penalty for individuals found in possession of weapons. With the resumption of the conflict, the Austrians left the duchy to engage in battle, and after the disastrous Piedmontese defeat at Novara, which definitively sealed the fate of the war, the Austrians, upon their return, reinstated Charles II on the throne while General Constantin d'Aspre, at the request of Field Marshal Joseph Radetzky, became the civil and military governor of Parma. On 14 March 1849, Charles II abdicated definitively in favour of his son Ferdinand-Charles, who, from London, accepted a commission that assumed administrative and executive powers until his arrival.

On 25 August 1849, Ferdinand Charles ascended the throne under the name Charles III of Parma. He was married to Louise d'Artois, daughter of the Duke of Berry Charles-Ferdinand d'Artois and sister of the "Count of Chambord", a legitimist claimant to the French throne. He was a highly controversial figure, intelligent but eccentric, and one of his first actions was to intervene against members of the regency and establish a commission tasked with investigating the expenses of the revolutionary government.

The duke asserted his intention to pursue autonomy from Austria, a relationship he perceived as constraining and a source of reliability in the face of external aggression or internal uprisings. He demanded behaviour from his subjects that he did not display and was known to be violent, exhibiting a lack of consistency in his conduct. The duchy was divided between liberals and legitimists, a movement that originated during the French Restoration and was supported by a traditionalist campaign. The cities exhibited a greater inclination towards the liberals. In 1853, the legitimists of Parma, with the support of the duchess, called for the abdication of the duke, who was then in Austria attending military manoeuvres. Upon learning of this, the duke closely monitored the duchess and dismissed the officials involved in the plot. In Parma, taxes were increased, and the inhabitants were subjected to surveillance by Police Chief Bassetti, who issued numerous orders for corporal punishment under the duke's demands. This resulted in a growing sense of discontent within the city. On 26 March 1854, the duke was stabbed on a street in Parma by Antonio Carra and subsequently died the following day at the age of 31.

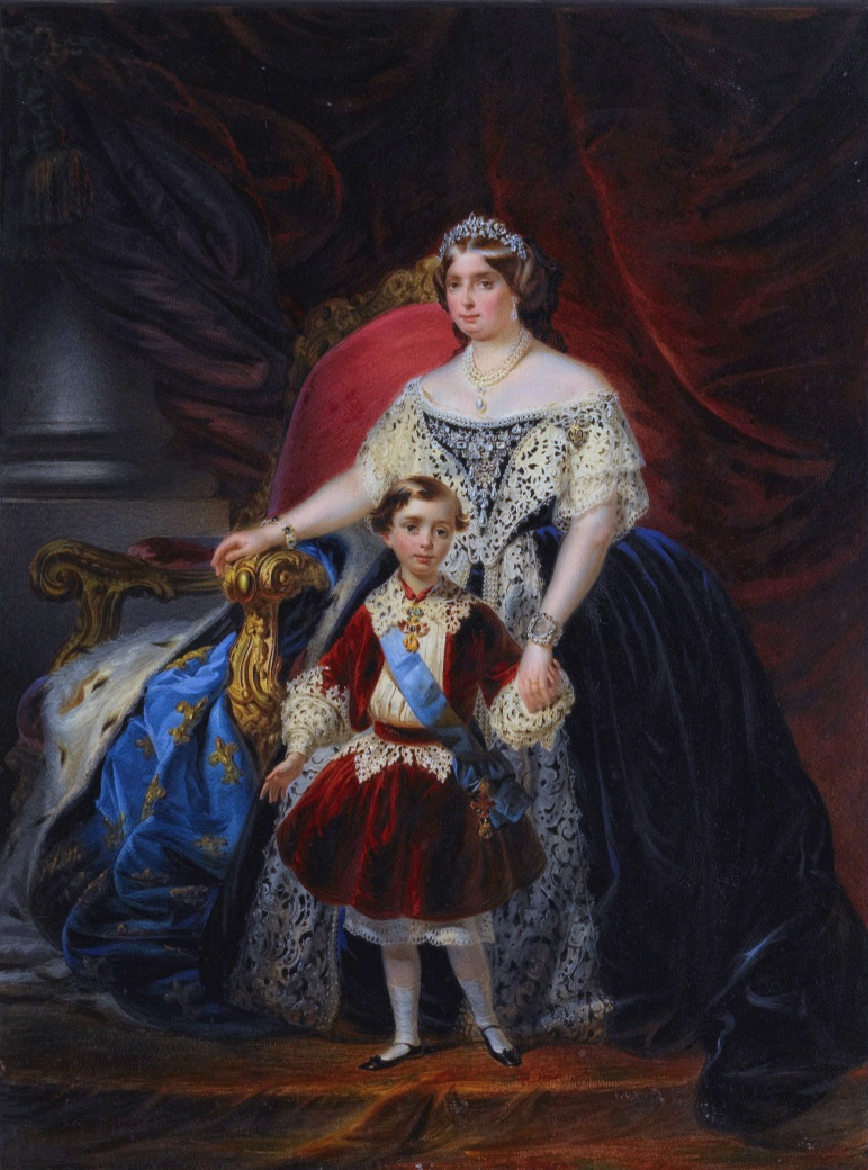
Duke Robert I and his mother, the regent Louise d'Artois, in 1854.

On 27 March the duke's widow, Louise-Marie, announced the death of her husband and the ascension of her son, Robert I, to the position of sovereign, with herself assuming the role of regent. To facilitate the alleviation of existing tensions, all ministers were replaced. The new government, which succeeded the military government of Charles III, sought to pursue neutrality and independence from Austria. However, on 22 July 1854, anxious subjects attempted to revolt. The uprising commenced with the occupation of two cafés. Upon the arrival of troops, shots were fired, inciting an insurrection that was forcefully suppressed by the Austrian army. Louise-Marie articulated her opposition to excessive judicial repression and called for an end to the trials and the return of the harshest officers to Austria. The Austrian troops permanently departed the duchy on 5 February 1857.

In early May 1859, with the outbreak of the Second Italian War of Independence, new unrest erupted. This resulted in the ruling family's relocation to Mantua. The Mazzinians established a provisional government, which was subsequently undermined by the military, who did not endorse their actions. The duchess then returned to Parma. On 9 June 1859, following the victory at Magenta, Louise-Marie departed Parma permanently, although she did not acquiesce without expressing her disapproval in a letter of protest written from St. Gall on 28 June.

Duke Robert I entered into two marriages and had 14 children. Among them was Princess Zita of Bourbon-Parma, who married Emperor Charles I of Austria in 1911. Additionally, there were Princes Sixtus of Bourbon-Parma and François-Xavier of Bourbon-Parma, who served as intermediaries in 1917 during a peace process initiated by their brother-in-law, the Emperor of Austria (Sixtus Affair). Prince François-Xavier assumed the role of head of the Carlist Bourbon-Parma House. Prince Félix of Bourbon-Parma married Grand Duchess Charlotte of Luxembourg. In the subsequent generation, Princess Anne of Bourbon-Parma, niece of the aforementioned, married former King Michael I of Romania in 1948, and Prince Carlos Hugo of Bourbon-Parma, eldest son of Prince François-Xavier, married Princess Irene of the Netherlands, sister of Queen Beatrix of the Netherlands, in 1964.

== Integration into the Kingdom of Sardinia (1859–1860) ==
The unification of Northern Italy was on the verge of being achieved under the leadership of the Kingdom of Sardinia. In June 1859, Lombardy was annexed by the results of the plebiscite held in 1848. However, the same did not occur concerning the states of Parma, which on 7 June 1859, were placed under Sardinian administration. On 15 August, Luigi Carlo Farini assumed the role of dictator over the region of Emilia, encompassing the states of Parma, Piacenza, and Modena. Concurrently, on 8 August, negotiations for peace between France and Austria commenced, though they lacked the approval of the Piedmontese. Indeed, on 11 July, Napoleon III had unilaterally requested an armistice. On 7 September 1859, Farini convened a constituent assembly that voted for the deposition of the Bourbon dynasty and union with the Kingdom of Sardinia. The Treaty of Zurich, signed on 11 November, which definitively ended the Franco-Austrian war, advocated for an Italian confederation in which the rights of sovereigns would be preserved. Nevertheless, the process of annexation had already commenced, and following a period of delay, on 3 December 1859, the United Provinces of Central Italy were established, uniting Modena, Parma, Piacenza, and Tuscany under the direction of Carlo Bon Compagni di Mombello. In January 1860, Sardinian Prime Minister Cavour formed a new government and organized a plebiscite, which was held on 11 March 1860, and confirmed the annexation of Emilia to the Kingdom of Victor Emmanuel II (Note: The annexation became official on 18 March 1860.) and thus to the Kingdom of Italy, which was proclaimed on 17 March 1861.

Plebiscites
Date	Registered voters	In favour of the annexation	Others
10 May 1848, Plaisance (annexation to the Kingdom of Sardinia)	37,587	37,089	For annexation to the Papal States: 352 For the Lombardy-Venetian Kingdom: 62 For Parma: 11
24 May 1848, Parma (annexation to the Kingdom of Sardinia)	39,000	37,250	For Charles II: 1,100 For annexation to the Papal States: 500 For the republic: 1
24 August 1859, Parma (annexation to the Kingdom of Sardinia)		63,167	Against annexation: 504
11 March 1860, Emilia (union with the constitutional monarchy of Victor-Emmanuel II)	427,512	426,006	Against annexation: 667

== See also ==
- House of Farnese
- House of Bourbon-Parma

== Bibliography ==
- Nuovo dizionario geografico universale statistico-storico-commerciale (in Italian). Giuseppe Antonelli. 1831. Archived from the original on 16 September 2024.
- Codice penale per gli Stati di Parma, Piacenza (PDF) (in Italian). Parma: Reale tipografia. 1820. Archived from the original (PDF) on 16 September 2024.
- Dall'Acqua, Marzio (1998). Enciclopedia di Parma. Dalle origini ai giorni nostri (in Italian). Parma: Franco Maria Ricci.
- Alfieri, Luigi (1993). Parma, la vita e gli amori. Storia della città dal Mille al Millenovecento (in Italian). Parma: Silva. ISBN 88-7765-042-7.
- Dall'Acqua, Marzio (1995). Gigli azzurri. Storia di casa Farnese (in Italian). Parma: Silva.
- Banti, Alberto Mario (2011). Il Risorgimento italiano (in Italian). Bari: Laterza. ISBN 978-88-420-8574-4.
- Bazzi, Tullo; Benassi, Umberto (1908). Storia di Parma (Dalle origini al 1860) (in Italian). Parma: Battei.
- Bernini, Ferdinando (1954). Storia di Parma (Dalle terramare al 1914) (in Italian). Parma: Battei.
- Chastenet, Geneviève (1982). Marie-Louise, l'impératrice oubliée (in French). Paris: J'ai lu. ISBN 2-277-22024-8.
- Lopresti, Lucia (1999). Granducato di Parma e Piacenza (in Italian). Demetra: Altante della Storia.
- Nafziger, George F; Gioannini, Marco (2002). The Defense of the Napoleonic Kingdom of Northern Italy, 1813–1814. Greenwood Publishing Group. ISBN 978-0-275-96797-0. Archived from the original on 11 March 2023.
- O. M. (1846). Quelques notices sur le comte Philippe François Magawly-Cerati de Calvy (in French). Paris: Librairie scientifique française et orientale. Archived from the original on 18 May 2022.
- Marchi, Adele Vittoria (1988). Parma e Vienna (in Italian). Parma: Artegrafica Silva.
- Molossi, Lorenzo (1834). Vocabolario topografico di Parma, Piacenza e Guastalla (in Italian). Parma. pp. 52–59. Archived from the original on 16 September 2024.
- Parente, Maria. Archivio di Stato di Parma (in Italian). Archives d'État de Parme. Archived from the original (PDF) on 2 December 2021.
- Romeo, Rosario (2011). Vita di Cavour (in French). Bari: Laterza. ISBN 978-88-420-7491-5.
- Rossi, Antonio Domenico (1833). Ristretto di storia patria ad uso dei Piacentini (in Italian). Vol. 5. Plaisance. Archived from the original on 27 March 2022.
- Stella, Gianfranco (1988). Parma (in Italian). Quaderni Parmensi.
- Ulrich, Ricken (1986). "Les deux grammaires de Condillac : Histoire Épistémologie Langage". Histoire Épistémologie Langage (in French). 8 (1). Dictionnaires, Grammaires, Catégories, Philosophie, Déchiffrement: 71–90. doi:10.3406/hel.1986.1230. Archived from the original on 16 September 2024.
- Zannoni, Mario (1981). L'esercito farnesiano dal 1694 al 1731 (in Italian). Palatina.
- Zannoni, Mario (2006). Napoleone Bonaparte a Parma nel 1805 (in Italian). MUP.
- Emilia Romagna (in French). Touring Club Italiano. 1998.
- Lasagni, Roberto (1987). "Farnese Ranuccio". Dizionario biografico dei Parmigiani (in Italian).
