= Duchy of Parma and Piacenza =

Former Italian state from 1545–1802 and 1814–1859

Duchy of Parma and Piacenza Ducato di Parma e Piacenza (Italian) Ducatus Parmae et Placentiae (Latin)
- 1545–1802 (1808); 1814–1859
- Top: Flag (1545–1731); Bottom: Flag (1851–1859) Coat of Arms under the House of Farnese Coat of Arms under the House of Bourbon-Parma
- Motto: Dirige me Domine! (Latin) Lead me, oh Lord!
- The Duchy of Parma and Piacenza (green)

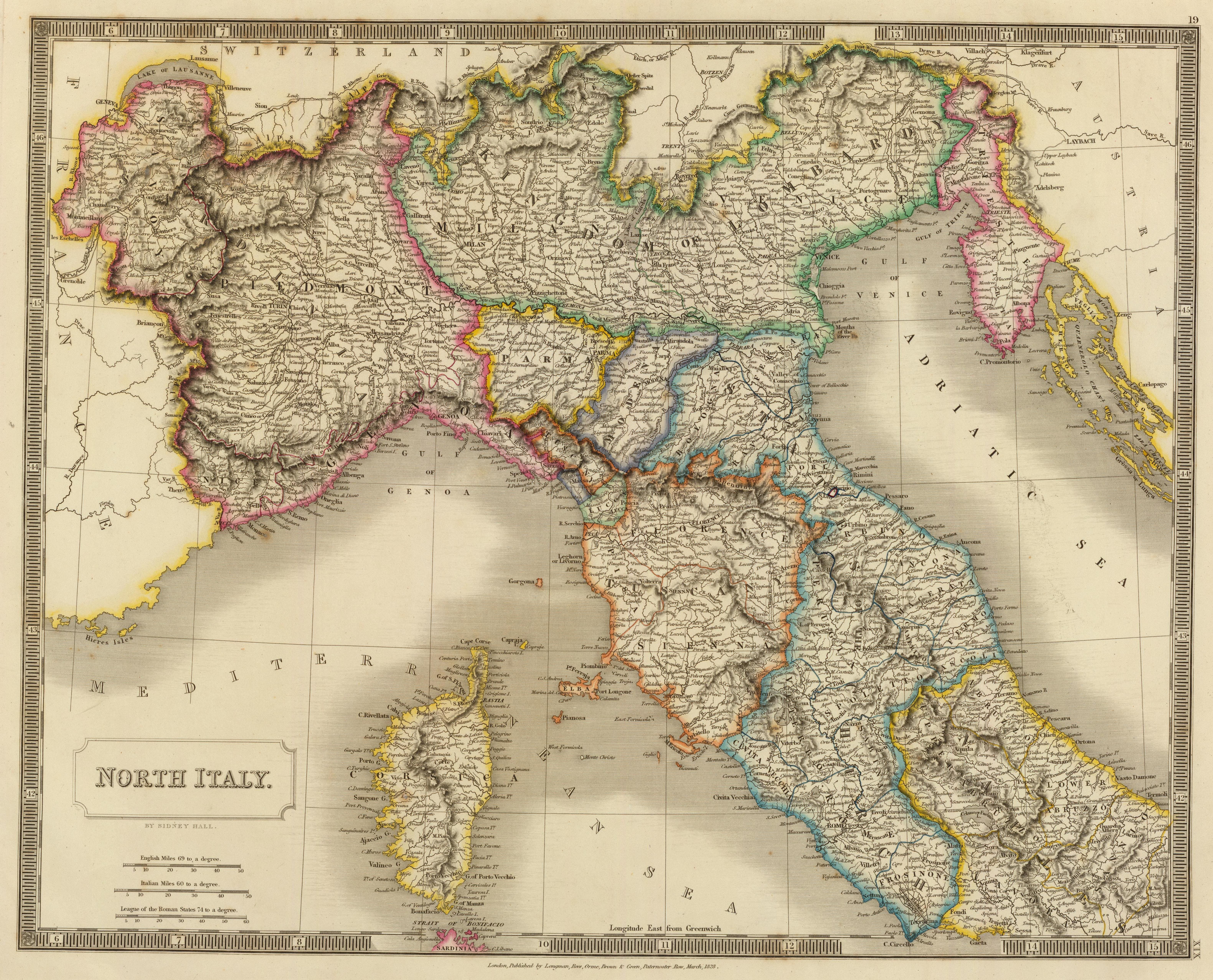
- Northern Italy in 1828.
- Status: Duchy
- Capital: Parma; Piacenza
- Common languages: Emilian; Italian; Latin
- Religion: Roman Catholicism
- Demonym: Parman
- Government: Absolute monarchy; Duchy
- Duke
  - 1545–1547: Pier Luigi Farnese (first)
  - 1854–1859: Robert I (last)
- History
  - Creation and granting of the title of duke to Pier Luigi Farnese by Pope Paul III: 16 September 1545
  - Treaty of Aix-la-Chapelle: 24 April 1748
  - Ceded to France: 21 March 1801
  - Formal annexation by France: 1808
  - Restored: 11 April 1814
  - Ceded to the United Provinces of Central Italy: 8 December 1859

Area
  - 1852: 2,184 sq mi (5,660 km^{2})

Population
  - 1852: 466,000
- Currency: Parman lira
Preceded by
| Papal States |
| Taro (department) |
| Duchy of Guastalla |
| Kingdom of Etruria |
Succeeded by
| Taro (department) |
| Kingdom of Etruria |
| United Provinces of Central Italy |
- Today part of: Italy

The Duchy of Parma and Piacenza (Italian: Ducato di Parma e Piacenza, Latin: Ducatus Parmae et Placentiae) was an Italian state created in 1545 and located in northern Italy, in the current region of Emilia-Romagna.

Originally a realm of the Farnese family after Pope Paul III made it a hereditary duchy for his son, Pier Luigi Farnese, it was ruled by the dynasty until 1731, when the last duke, Antonio Farnese, died without direct heirs. After a decade of Habsburg rule, the duchy passed to the House of Bourbon-Parma.

It was invaded by Napoleon and annexed by France, having its sovereignty restored in 1814 after Napoleon's defeat. Napoleon's wife, Marie Louise (Maria Luigia), then ruled as its duchess until her death. Parma was restored to Bourbon rule in 1847, and in 1859, the duchy was formally abolished as it was integrated into the new Italian state.

== History ==
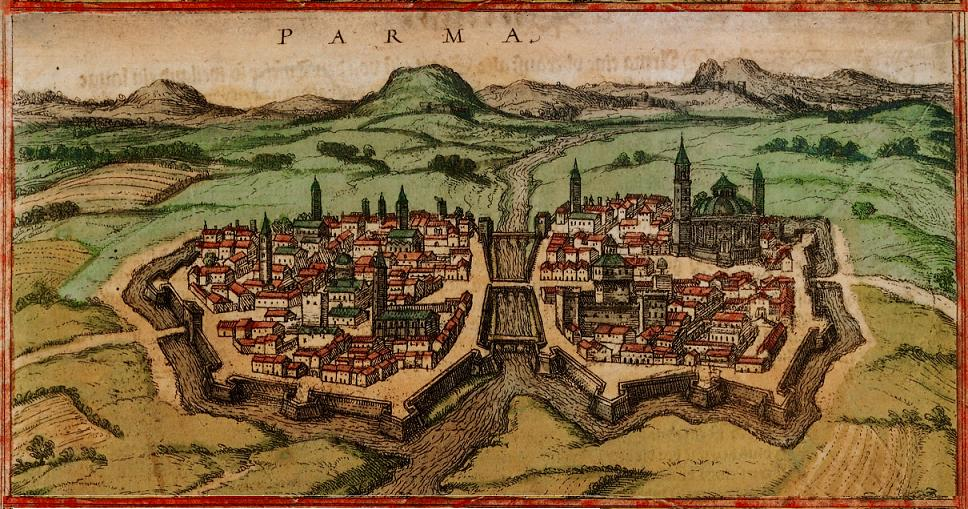
The 16th-century city of Parma, at the early stages of the duchy.

The Duchy of Parma was created by Pope Paul III (Alessandro Farnese) in 1545 from former parts of the Duchy of Milan south of the Po River which had been conquered by the Papal States in 1512. These territories, centered on the city of Parma, were given as a fief to Paul III's illegitimate son, Pier Luigi Farnese.

In 1556, the second Duke, Ottavio Farnese, was given the city of Piacenza, becoming thus also Duke of Piacenza, and so the state was thereafter known as the Duchy of Parma and Piacenza (Italian: Ducato di Parma e Piacenza). The Farnese family continued to rule until the extinction of their male line in 1731.

=== The consolidation of the duchy ===
Ottavio Farnese strove to make the duchy prosperous, to win the support of the people by applying the wise measures already taken by his father, and to flatter the local nobility using more moderation than Pier Luigi. He knew how to consolidate the duchy by promoting its economy and financial and commercial exchanges and culture. He started territorial expansion with the annexation of some fiefdoms. In 1573 the number of inhabitants of the new capital had increased considerably reaching 26,000. Alessandro Farnese, who was also an important general of the Spanish army, succeeding the leadership of the duchy, was forced by King Philip II of Spain to appoint his seventeen-year-old son Ranuccio I Farnese, as regent, since the Spanish King did not want to deprive himself of the able and valiant general.

Alessandro died far from Parma on 3 December 1592 from gangrene caused by an arquebus ball during the siege of Can de Bec. A year before his death, he ordered the construction of the fortress of the Citadel with the aim of affirming the power of the family but also to provide work to a labor force of 2,500 people made up mostly of the poor sections of the city population. Ranuccio I, passionate about arts and music, made the ducal court the first in Italy in the musical arts. During this period, the city was enriched with unique monuments, such as the Palazzo della Pilotta, the Palazzo Ducale, and the Teatro Farnese, modern legislation was passed, which made Parma a center of excellence both in terms of lifestyle and as an architectural model, elevating it as a cultural capital to the same level of other important European capitals. His government was guilty of the public execution of over 100 Parma citizens accused of conspiring against him. In 1628, on the death of Ranuccio I, the duchy was passed on to his just sixteen-year-old son Odoardo, who on 11 October of the same year married the fifteen-year-old Margherita de' Medici in Florence, daughter of Cosimo II de' Medici, Grand Duke of Tuscany.

These were difficult years for the duchy, whose population was decimated by the terrible plague of 1630. In addition, to finance his army of 6,000 infantry the new duke forced his subjects into severe deprivation, getting into debt with bankers and merchants. Despite the high expenses incurred, his first campaign was negative: Piacenza was occupied by Spanish troops, Odoardo's troops were defeated in the territory of Parma by Francesco I d'Este, Duke of Modena, and he was forced to sign a peace treaty with Spain under which, once the alliance with France was dissolved, he would have evacuated Piacenza.

On his death in Piacenza on 11 September 1646 at the age of 34, the duchy passed to his son Ranuccio II. For two years the regency was exercised by Odoardo's widow, Margherita de' Medici and his brother Cardinal Francesco Maria Farnese, until Ranuccio II reached the age of eighteen. In 1691 the Duchy of Parma was invaded by the Imperial army and plundered by the four thousand soldiers who arrived in Parma with women and children; not only their maintenance fell on the subjects, but rape, abuse, and violence followed one another without respite. Ranuccio II made many works to improve the situation of his subjects, but the contrast between the carefree life of the court and the coffers of the treasury was truly remarkable. To meet the expenses of the court, the duke taxed everything except ecclesiastical income. During his reign, Ranuccio II acquired many precious paintings and volumes. He also moved most of the Farnese Collection from Rome to Parma. In 1688 the new Ducal Theater was inaugurated.

Ranuccio II's eldest son, Odoardo (1666-1693), married Countess Palatine Dorothea Sophie of Neuburg in 1690. They had two children: Alessandro (1691-1693) and Elisabeth (1692-1766).

On 11 December 1694, Ranuccio II died suddenly. His sixteen-year-old second son Francesco succeeded as duke. He married Dorothea, the widow of his brother.

=== Rule of Francesco Farnese ===
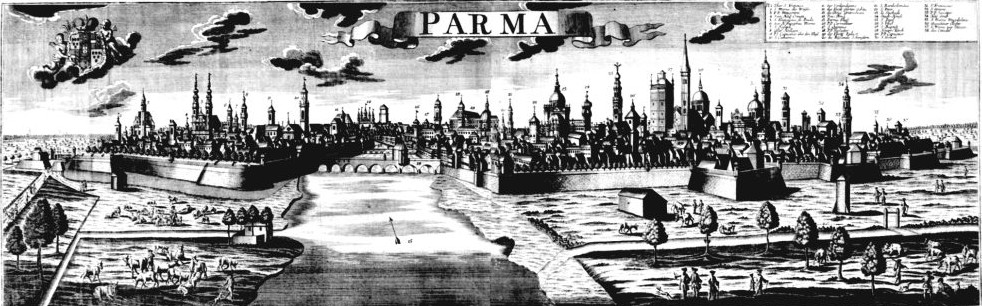
Parma in the early 18th century.

Francesco Farnese's work fully brought the Farnese dynasty back to the center of great politics. Having inherited a disastrous financial situation, in order to try to heal it he cut all the unnecessary expenses of the court by firing most of the servants, musicians, jesters and dwarves. He also abolished performances, court parties and banquets. A hydraulic work was built to defend the city of Piacenza from the erosion of the Po, the expansion of the University of Parma and the Collegio dei Nobili was favored, encouraging the study of public law, history, languages and geography. Artists, writers, musicians and playwrights enjoyed the protection of the Court. In 1712 the renovation works of the Ducal Palace of Colorno began, completed in 1730. In 1714 the duchy achieved an important diplomatic success when Francesco, thanks to the offices of his ambassador in Spain Giulio Alberoni, was able to marry his niece Elisabeth to King Philip V of Spain, who had been widowed earlier that year.

=== Extinction of the Farnese and House of Bourbon-Parma ===
Because of the lack of male heirs, Elisabeth Farnese, niece of Duke Antonio Farnese, was declared the Farnese heiress. She received many marriage proposals, finally marrying in 1714 Philip V of Spain. On the death of childless Duke Antonio in 1731, Philip V asserted the rights that his wife had over the duchies according to the agreements signed in the Treaty of Vienna of 1725 and the Treaty of Seville of 1729, and he claimed both for the Spanish House of Bourbon. The Duchy would thus be inherited by his first son with Elisabeth, Infante Carlos of Spain, who reigned as Duke Charles I of Parma and Piacenza. He ruled his territories for four years until the end of the War of the Polish Succession, when, according to what was established in the Treaty of Vienna (1738), he handed over both duchies to the House of Habsburg in exchange for the Kingdoms of Naples and Sicily.

The Habsburgs only ruled until the conclusion of the War of the Austrian Succession in 1748, whose final peace treaty, the Treaty of Aix-la-Chapelle, ceded back the duchy to the Bourbons in the person of Infante Philip of Spain, younger brother of Charles I. Duke Philip became the founder of the House of Bourbon-Parma, reigning over an expanded Duchy of Parma, Piacenza and Guastalla (Italian: Ducato di Parma, Piacenza e Guastalla), the Gonzaga rulers of neighbouring Guastalla having died out in 1746.

In 1796, the duchy was occupied by French troops under Napoleon, and the political situation of the state became extremely confused. Ferdinand maintained his throne under French military governors until the Treaty of Aranjuez of 1801, when a general agreement between the House of Bourbon and Napoleon formally decided the cession of the duchy to France in exchange for Tuscany, but the Duke remained in Parma until he died in 1802.

=== Napoleonic era (1796-1814) ===
Napoleon Bonaparte was undecided about the future of the duchy, aspiring to a total engagement of the Bourbons in the European wars as his allies. Even as French laws and administration were gradually introduced by the French "administrator" Médéric Louis Élie Moreau de Saint-Méry, the formal annexation to the French Empire was declared only in 1808 after the outbreak of the Peninsular War. The duchy was reformed as the département of Taro.

=== Last decades of the duchy (1814 to 1860) ===
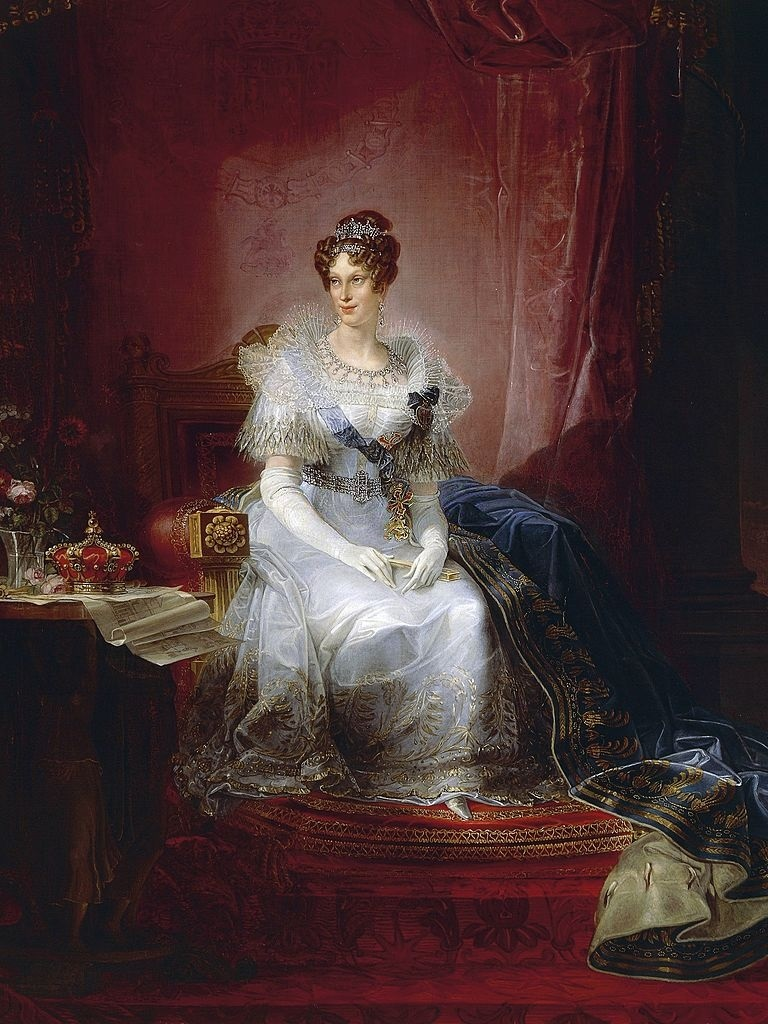
Portrait of Marie Louise by Giovanni Battista Borghesi, 1839

In 1814, the duchies were given to Napoleon's Habsburg wife, Marie-Louise, styled in Italian Maria-Luigia, who ruled them for the rest of her life. After her death in 1847, the Duchy was restored to the Bourbon-Parma family, which had been ruling the tiny Duchy of Lucca. Guastalla was ceded to Modena. The Bourbon-Parma regime was more reactionary than Marie-Louise's, provoking an uprising in 1848 which temporarily drove them out.

The Bourbons ruled until 1859, when they were driven out by a revolution following the French and Sardinian victory in the war against Austria (called the Austrian War in France and the Second War of Independence in Italy). It was the only case in Italy where the ruling monarchs were successfully driven out by two consecutive uprisings, thanks to the inhabitants' rising aspirations for Italian unification and strong hatred for the Bourbons after the less reactionary reign of Marie Louise.

In December 1859, the Duchy of Parma and Piacenza was combined with the Grand Duchy of Tuscany and the Duchy of Modena to form the United Provinces of Central Italy. In March 1860, after a referendum, this merged with the Kingdom of Sardinia, which in 1861 changed its name to the Kingdom of Italy.

== Historical flags and coat of arms ==
State Flags

1545-1731
(Farnese)

1815-1847
(Habsburg-Lorraine)

Civil ensign
1815-1847
(Habsburg-Lorraine)

1848-1849
(Bourbon-Parma)

1850-1851
(Bourbon-Parma)

1851-1859
(Bourbon-Parma)

Civil ensign
1851-1859
(Bourbon-Parma)
Coat of arms

1545-1586
(Farnese)

1586-1731
(Farnese)

1748-1802
(Bourbon-Parma)

1814-1847
(Habsburg-Lorraine)

1847-1860
(Bourbon-Parma)

== See also ==
- County of Guastalla
- Historical states of Italy
- House of Farnese
- House of Bourbon-Parma
- Duke of Parma
- Pauline Bonaparte
- History of the Duchy of Parma and Piacenza
- Guardasone Castle
