= Giovanni Battista Tinti =

Italian painter (1558–1617)

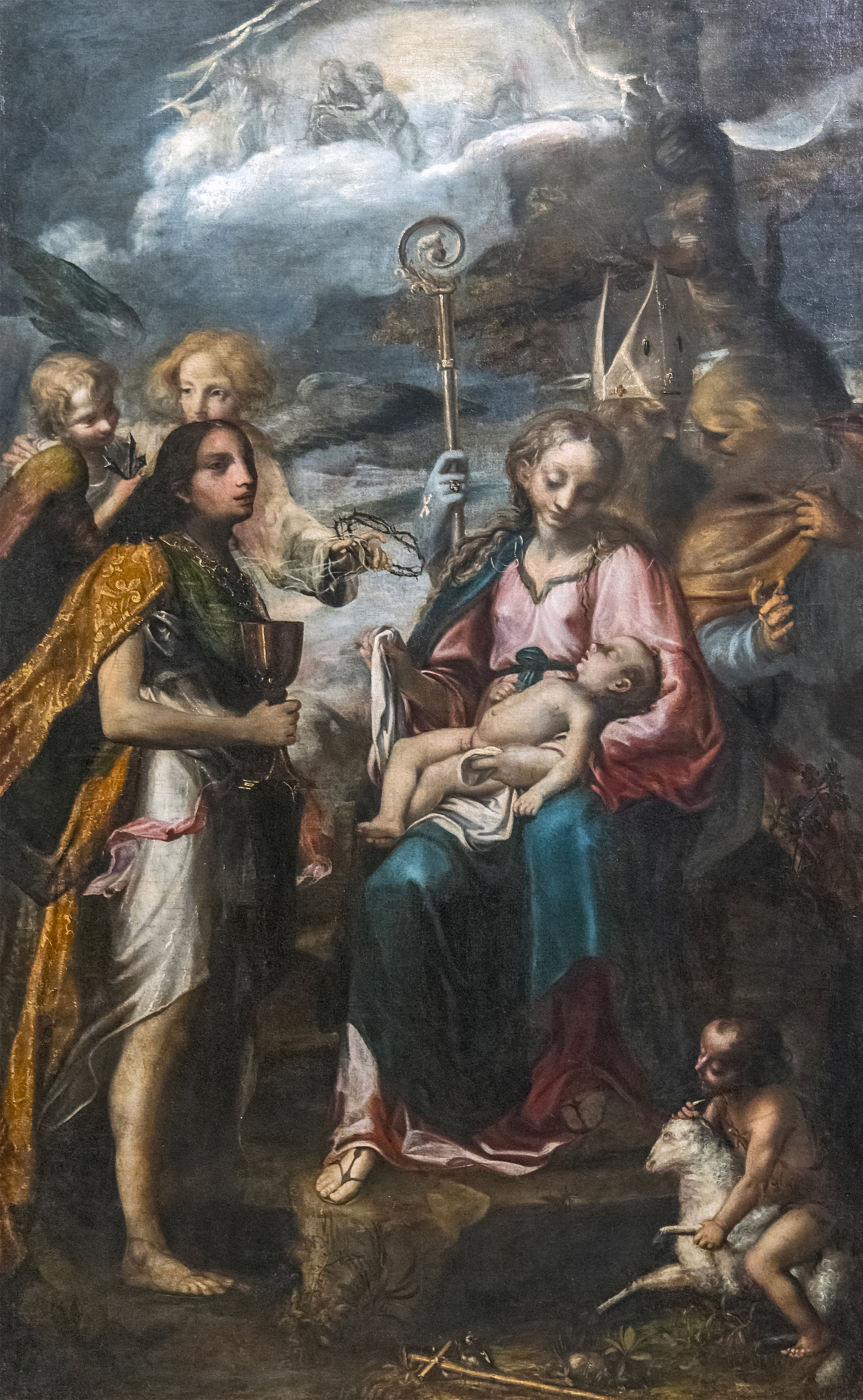
Giovanni Battista Tinti, The Virgin with the child and the mystery of the Passion, 1588 Musée des Augustins de Toulouse

Giovanni Battista Tinti (1558-1617) was an Italian painter of the Renaissance period. He studied first under Orazio Samacchini in Bologna, and subsequently established himself in Parma, where he was inspired chiefly by the work of Tibaldi, Correggio and Parmigianino. He painted an Assumption for the cathedral of Parma and the cupola frescoes for the church of Santa Maria degli Angeli in Parma.
