= Portrait of Marie Louise (Borghesi) =

Painting by Giovanni Battista Borghesin

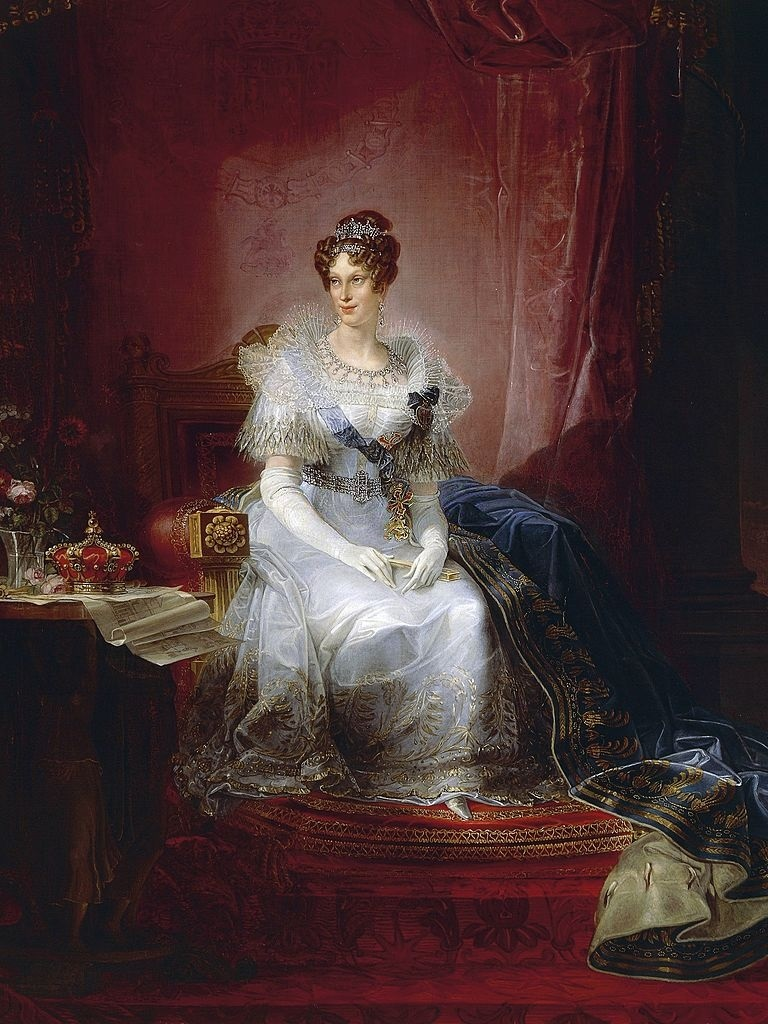
- Artist: Giovanni Battista Borghesi
- Year: 1839
- Type: Oil on canvas, portrait painting
- Dimensions: 252 cm × 192 cm (99 in × 76 in)
- Location: Galleria nazionale di Parma; Parma

Portrait of Marie Louise (Italian: Ritratto di Maria Luigia d'Austria) is an 1839 portrait painting by the Italian artist Giovanni Battista Borghesi. It depicts Marie Louise, Duchess of Parma. Part of the Hapsburg Dynasty, she was the eldest the daughter of Francis I of Austria. In 1810 at the age of eighteen she became the second wife of Napoleon. She was Empress of the French from 1810 to Napoleon's defeat in 1814, and had a son the King of Rome with him. By the terms of the Congress of Vienna she became Duchess of Parma, the sovereign ruler of the Duchy of Parma and Piacenza for the rest of her life. She was separated from her husband, who after his defeat at the Battle of Waterloo was exiled to the British island of Saint Helena from 1815 to his death in 1821.

Borghesi, a former pupil of the neoclassical artist Biagio Martini, served as the court painter for the Duchy. The painting was commissioned in 1837 by the Duchess for the Palazzo del Giardino, instructing Borghesi to base the head on the 1812 portrait of her produced by François Gérard while she was still Empress of France. Today the painting is in the Galleria nazionale di Parma.

== Bibliography ==
- Palmer, Alan. Napoleon & Marie Louise: The Second Empress. Constable, 2001.
- Schianchi, Lucia Fornari. Galleria Nazionale di Parma. Catalogo delle opere, L'Otto e Novecento. Milan, 2001
