= Santa Teresa del Bambin Gesù, Parma =

Church building in Parma, Italy

Coordinates: 44°48′21.75″N 10°19′43.45″E

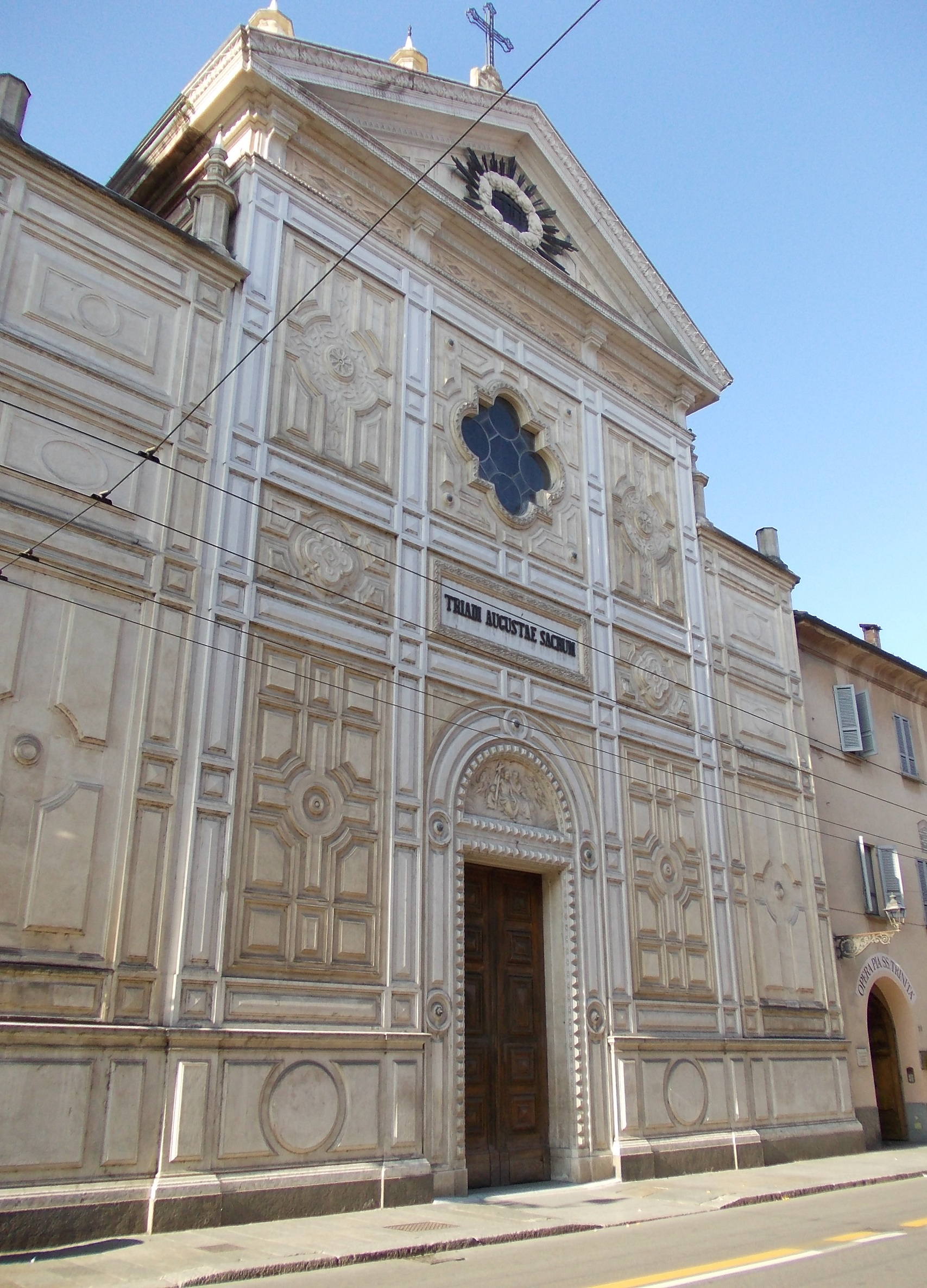

Santa Teresa del Bambin Gesù, also known as the Chiesa della Trinità Nuova, is a Roman Catholic parish church located on Strada Garibaldi 28 in Parma, region of Emilia Romagna, Italy. This building was once was the Oratory dei Trinità Rossi.

== History ==
The church was founded by the Confranternity dei Rossi, so-named because they wore a pink cape. In 1584, they had been associated with the church of the Santissima Trinità, but by the first two decades of the 1600s, they had chosen a small oratory near San Barnaba, to build a new site of prayer. It was first enlarged in 1636 under the direction of Girolamo Rainaldi, again in 1685 under Stefano Lolli. In 1920, the church was passed on to the Discalced Carmelites, and renamed in 1973, as Santa Teresa del Bambino Gesù and dedicated to Saint Thérèse of Lisieux.

The third chapel on the right reproduces the measurements of the Santa Casa that is venerated in the Shrine of Loreto. The bas-relief on the portal is by Antonio Ilarioli. The present marble façade was designed by Ernesto Piazza, and built from 1862 to 1864. The interior stucco decoration was completed by Domenico Reti in the 17th century.

The oval canvas in the main altar is a Trinity by Giovan Battista Borghesi. The church also has paintings by Alessandro Tiarini; Giulio Cesare Amidano (Virgin and Child with St Carlo Borromeo, Francesco, and Caterina); and Vincenzo Campi.
