= Santa Maria degli Angeli, Parma =

Church in Parma, Italy

Coordinates: 44°47′42.85″N 10°19′38.08″E

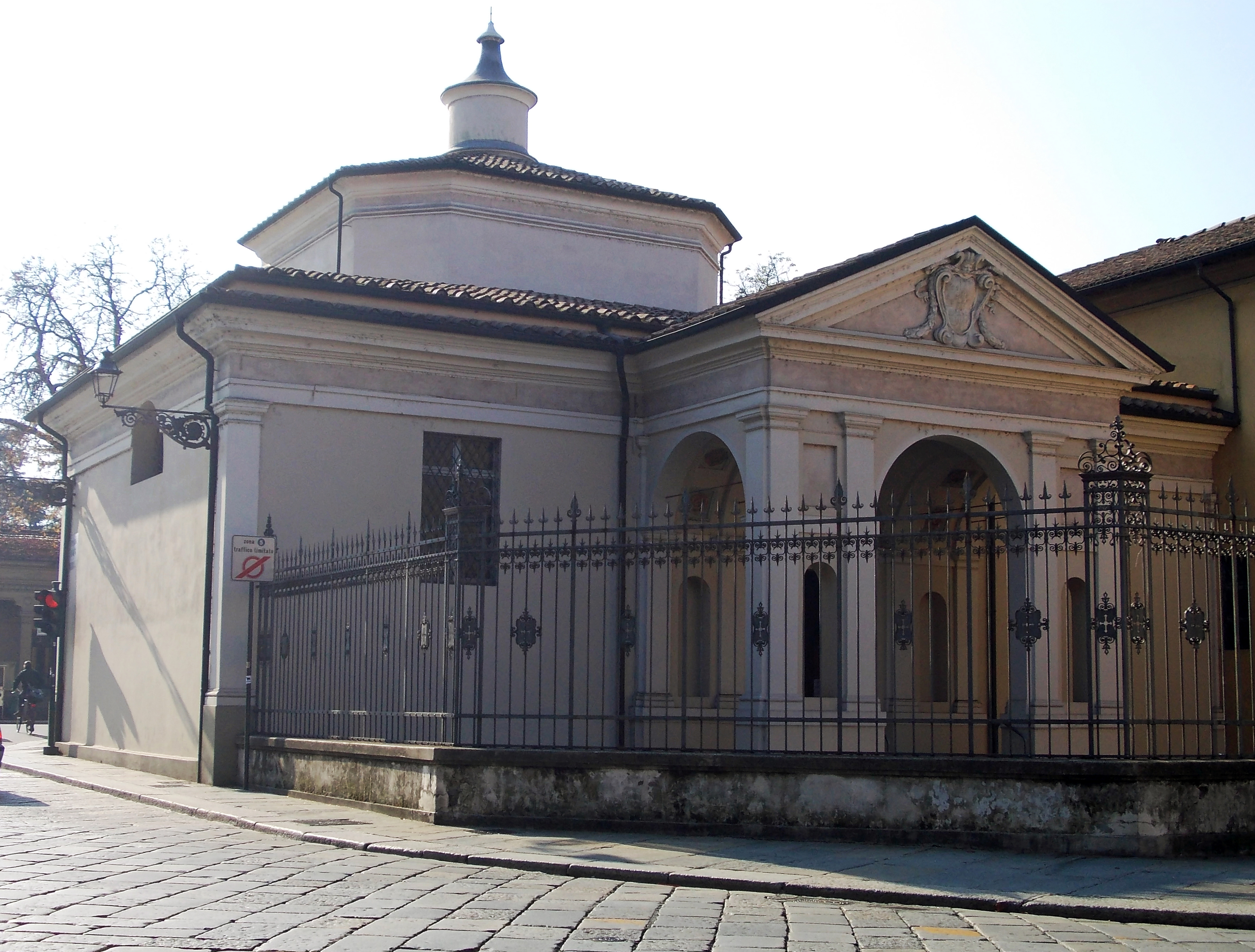
Chiesa di Santa Maria degli Angeli

Santa Maria degli Angeli (Saint Mary of Angels), also called Santa Maria dell'Addolorata (Saint Mary of Sorrows) or Santa Maria del Bambin Gesù (Saint Mary of the Child Jesus), is a church in central Parma, Italy.

== History ==
An oratory on the site was erected for the veneration of an icon painted on the wall of the city, near the Porta Nuova. In 1562–1569, a church was built under the designs of the architect Giovanni Francesco Testa. In 1686, a monastery of Capuchin Clare nuns was founded adjacent to the church by the Duke Ranuccio II Farnese. The monastery was suppressed in 1810.

The cupola was frescoed starting in 1588 by Giovanni Battista Tinti with an Assumption of Mary surrounded by the biblical figures of Mozes, Ezekiel, Gideon, and Jesse. The paintings on the walls of the nave were completed by Alessandro and his brother, Pier Antonio Bernabei. The main altarpiece is a Pieta by the Venetian Sebastiano Ricci.
