= Santa Teresa di Gesù Bambino =

Catholic sanctuary in Verona, Italy

Coordinates: 45°25′6″N 10°59′11″E

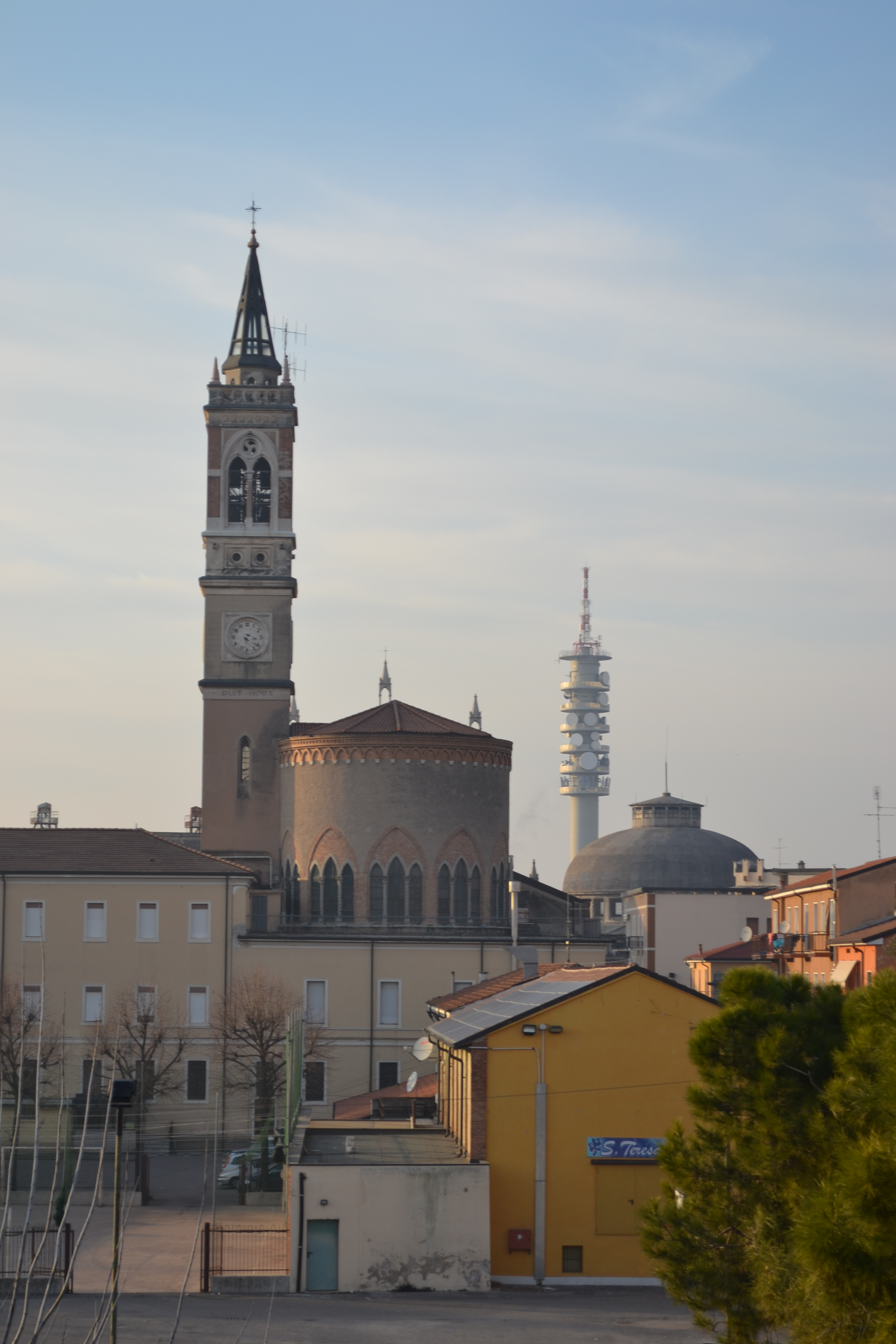
Santa Teresa di Gesù Bambino

Santa Teresa di Gesù Bambino (St. Therese of the Child Jesus) is a place of Roman Catholic worship, or sanctuary, in Verona, Italy. Located in the southern outskirts of the city, in the Borgo Roma District, entrusted to the Discalced Carmelites. Construction began in 1901, was completed in 1904 and the church was consecrated the following year.

The first stone was laid on 29 July 1901 and the project was completed in 1904. On 15 January 1905, Bartolomeo Cardinal Bacilieri, Bishop of Verona inaugurated and blessed the church, originally dedicated to the Holy Family. Pope Pius XI raised it to the rank of minor basilica in 1938.

== Description ==
=== Exterior ===
Two Gothic spires adorn the church's roof. The façade was clad in brick in 1968, while the bell tower was completed in 1955.

The large square is surrounded by a sober and elegant wrought iron gate, supported by a foundation and white marble columns. In the middle of the square, surrounded by a bed of roses, stands the monument to Saint Therese, in white Carrara marble, sculpted in the characteristic position of throwing "her roses" towards those who come to the sanctuary.

The neo-Gothic bell tower, with bold and sweet forms, houses a fine concert of bells hung for ringing in Veronese bellringing art. The collection was forged by the secular papal company of Daciano Colbachini of Padua in 1955. The largest of the nine bells emits the note of E flat, has a diameter of 120 cm and weighs 992 kg. Electricity was installed in 1957, in defiance of the Carmelite spirit and tradition of bell-ringing concerts which has previously only been performed by hand.

=== Interior ===
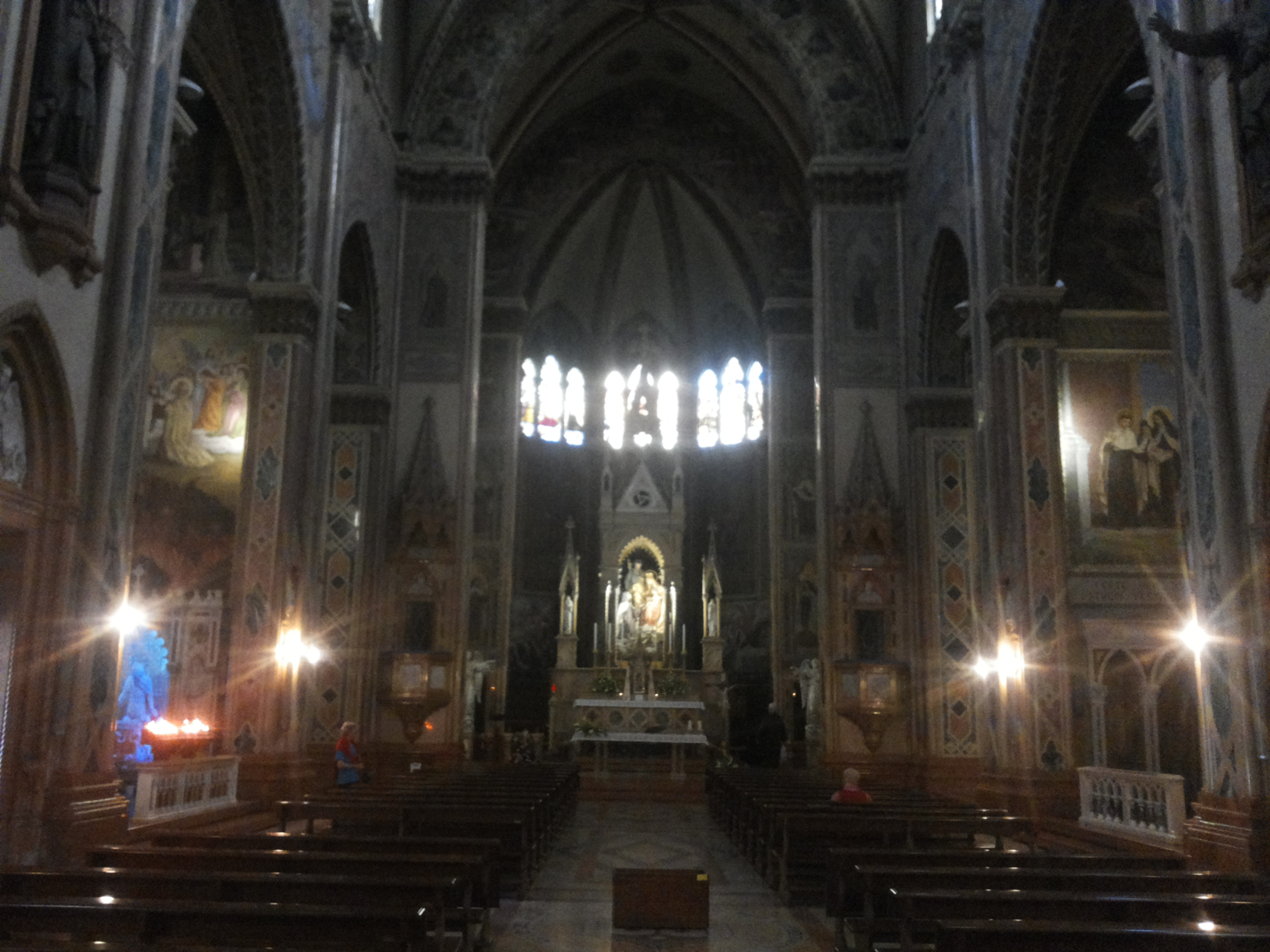
Interior of the Church

The church's origins date back to January 1905, when it was blessed and inaugurated by the then Bishop of Verona Bartolomeo Bacilieri. The building was left incomplete (with only perimeter walls, no plaster, a rough ceiling and a concrete floor) until 1922 to 1923, when devotion to St Therese of the Child Jesus began to spread. The Gothic style church is presented in rare splendour with polychrome marbles, sculptures, mosaics, windows, paintings and decorations. On the large wall behind the façade is a fresco by Ugo Bargellini of Florence, which depicts the apotheosis of the Carmelite, with details of Saint Therese of the Child Jesus. 220 figures are depicted across 144 m² of wall.

==== Chapel of Saint Therese of the Child Jesus ====
The heart of the sanctuary is the chapel of Santa Teresa of the Child Jesus, which is richly decorated. At the centre is a solid bronze urn, supported by four angels. It contains a wax statue of the saint, depicted in the act of breathing her last, peering at the crowds of devotees and pilgrims who trust in her. In her hands she holds roses, eternally renewing her promise: "I will let fall a shower of roses." The statue is dressed in a Carmelite habit, wearing the veil that Teresa had worn for several years in the monastery of Lisieux, and bears a reliquary chest in silver filigree containing a vertebra of the saint.

==== Pipe organ ====
The 4700 pipes of the organ designed by Fratelli Ruffatti are placed around two rooms with open galleries in the presbytery. It was installed in 1959 and restored in 1994. It has, 3 keyboards, 61 keys and a radial concave pedalboard of 32 keys, with an electric console, 101 plates, 3 pedal brackets (crescendo, espressivo I, espressivo III), and 10 to 16 adjustable memory banks.
