= Giovanni Battista Borghesi =

Italian painter (1790–1846)

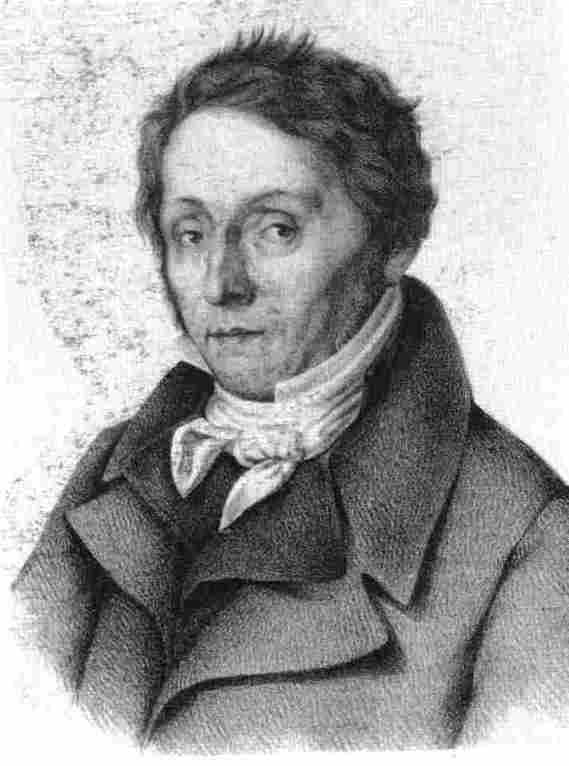
- Engraved portrait in Le strade di Parma, by Tiziano Marcheselli.
- Born: Giovanni Battista Borghesi; 25 November 1790; Parma
- Died: 11 December 1846 (aged 56); Parma, Italy
- Known for: Painting
- Movement: Neoclassicism

Giovan Battista Borghesi, also called Giovanni Battista or Giambattista (25 November 1790 – 11 December 1846) was an Italian painter and scenic designer of the Neoclassic period, active mainly in Parma.

== Biography ==
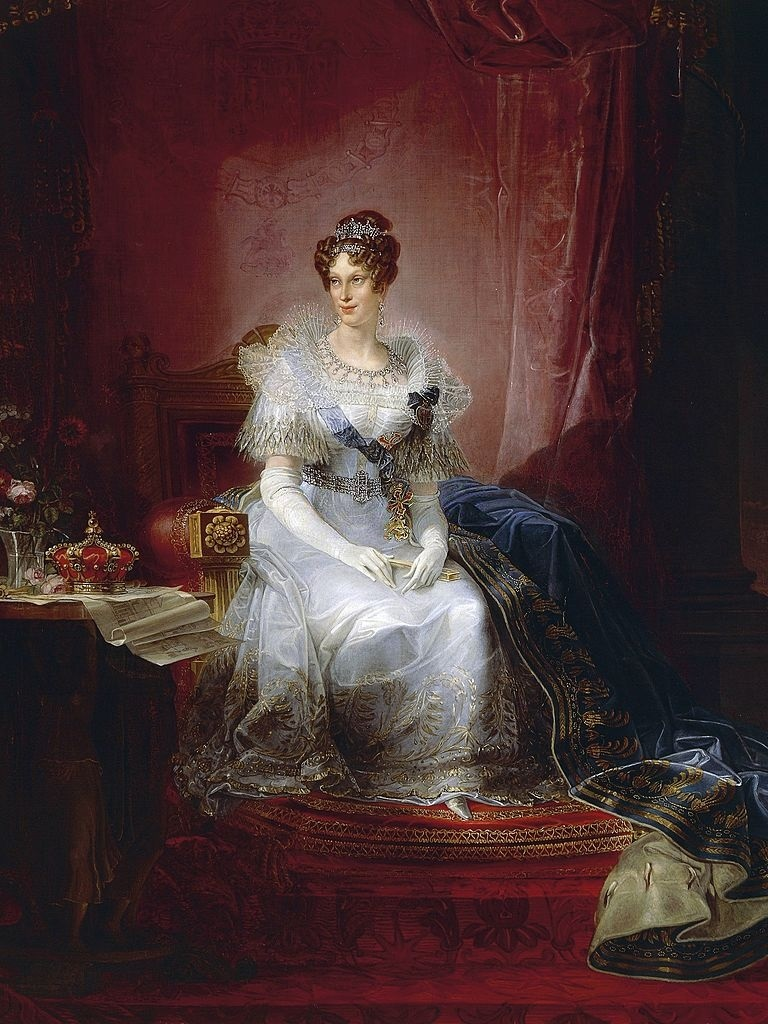
Portrait of Marie Louise, 1839

He studied in Parma under Biagio Martini. Among his first works were frescoes of the Death of Hector and Flight of the Vestals painted for the house of his uncle, Pietro Borghesi. He painted a Madonna and Child with Saints for the church of Santa Margherita in Colorno; a Sant'Antonio Abate for the church of Sant'Uldarico; and a Trinity altarpiece (1822) for the Oratory of Trinità dei Rossi.

He obtained a stipend from the Duchy in 1823, and used it to study and work for years in Rome, where he also painted scenography for the Teatro Argentina. Returning to Parma in 1830, he was nominated professor of painting at the Parmesan Academy of Fine Arts. In Parma, he worked as a restorer, including of the frescoes of Parmigianino at the Rocca Sanvitale of Fontanellato. He painted a portrait of the Duchess Maria Luigia (portrait now in the Galleria Nazionale di Parma). He painted the ceiling and theater curtain (sipario) of the new Teatro Regio of Parma. The latter depicts the Triumph of Wisdom. He also frescoed a ceiling in the Biblioteca Palatina. He died after an illness that led to paralysis.
