= Princess Amalia d'Este =

Amalia d'Este
- Princess of Modena and Reggio
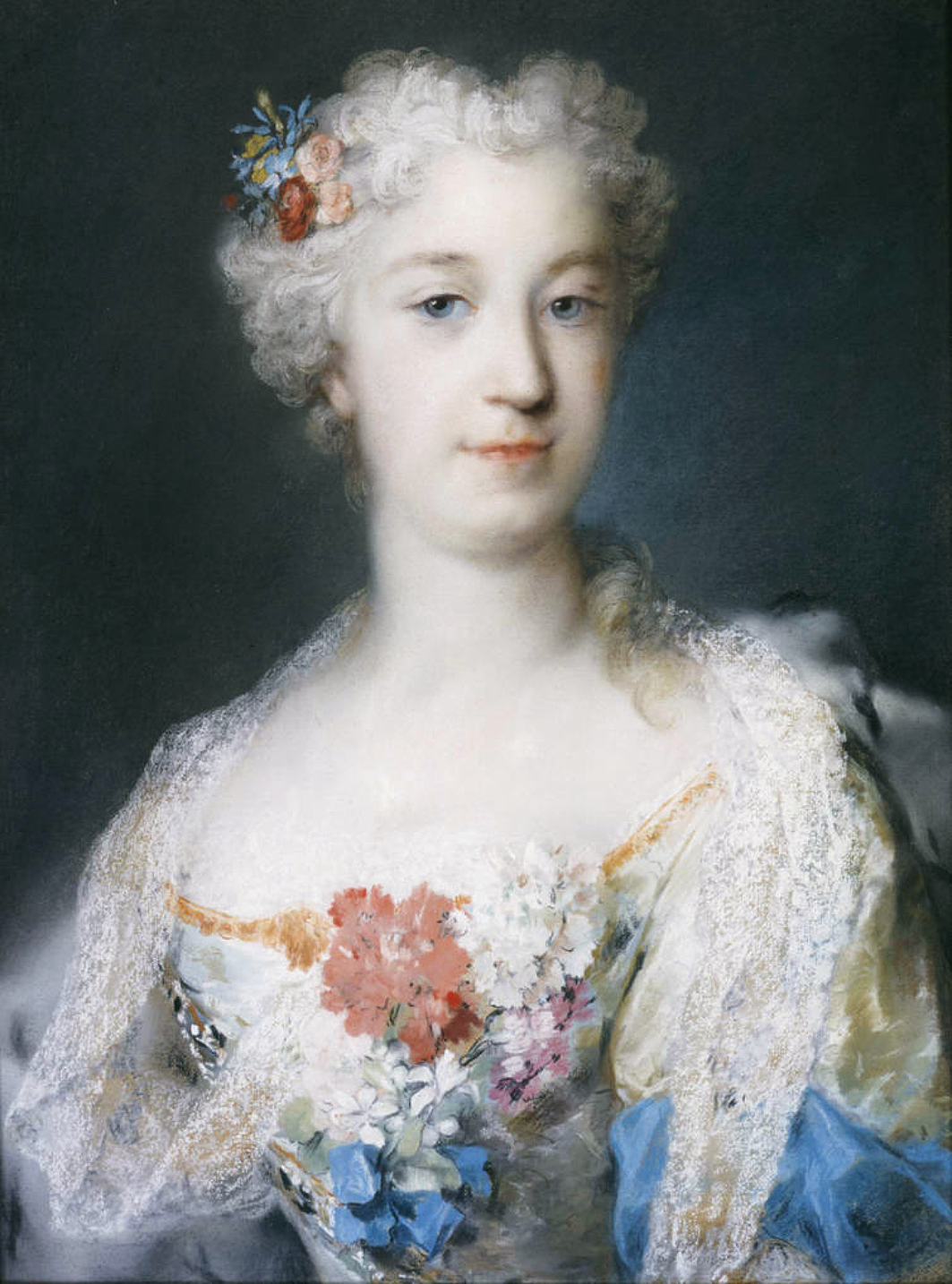
- Portrait by Rosalba Carriera.
- Born: 28 July 1699; Ducal Palace of Modena, Modena
- Died: 5 July 1778 (aged 78); Modena
- Burial: San Vincenzo, Modena
- Spouse: Marquis of Villeneuf
Names
- Amalia Giuseppina d'Este
- Father: Rinaldo d'Este
- Mother: Duchess Charlotte of Brunswick-Lüneburg

Amalia Giuseppina d'Este (28 July 1699 – 5 July 1778) was an Italian noblewoman and princess of Modena and Reggio by birth. She served as Regent of the Duchy of Modena and Reggio in October-December 1737 during the absence of her brother Francesco III.

== Biography ==
Amalia was the daughter of the Duke Rinaldo d'Este and Duchess Charlotte of Brunswick-Lüneburg, daughter of John Frederick, Duke of Brunswick-Calenberg. One of seven children, she was the second daughter of the family. Her parents' marriage had required papal dispensation because of the close interrelationships of the ducal families of Brunswick and Modena. Her mother died in 1710 after giving birth to a dead daughter, leaving five small children behind. Amalia grew up in the Ducal Palace of Modena alongside her siblings Benedetta, Francesco, Gian Federico (who died young) and Enrichetta.

In 1723, her portrait was painted by Rosalba Carriera during the painter's stay in Modena at the request of her father. The portrait is currently kept in the Gemäldegalerie Alte Meister, Dresden.

After the death of her father in October 1737, her brother Francesco succeeded him as Duke of Modena in his absence. Since her brother was absent from Modena fighting in the Russo-Turkish War, Amalia and her older sister Benedetta assumed the regency of the duchies until the return of their brother in December.

Charles Emmanuel III of Sardinia was proposed as a possible husband for her, but the marriage never materialized. Amalia secretly married an adventurer, the "Marquis de Villeneuf" (¿?-1739), who died fighting at the Battle of Futach in 1739. The couple had no children. Amalia died on July 5, 1778, shortly before her seventy-ninth birthday. She was buried in the Church of San Vincenzo, Modena.
