= Princess Benedetta d'Este =

Benedetta d'Este
- Princess of Modena and Reggio
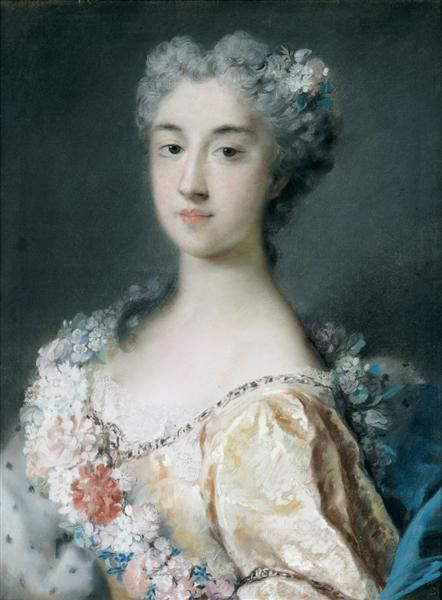
- Portrait by Rosalba Carriera, 1723.
- Born: 18 August 1697; Palazzo Ducale, Modena
- Died: 17 September 1777 (aged 80); Sassuolo, Modena
- Burial: San Vincenzo, Modena
Names
- Benedetta Maria Ernestina d'Este
- Father: Rinaldo d'Este
- Mother: Duchess Charlotte of Brunswick-Lüneburg

Benedetta Maria Ernestina d'Este (18 August 1697 – 17 September 1777) was an Italian noblewoman and princess of the Duchy of Modena and Reggio. She served as Regent of the Duchy of Modena and Reggio during the absence of her younger brother Francesco III d'Este in October - December 1737.

== Biography ==
She was the first child and eldest daughter of Duke Rinaldo d'Este and Duchess Charlotte of Brunswick-Lüneburg, daughter of the Duke of Brunswick and Lüneburg. Her parents' marriage had required papal dispensation because of the close interrelationships of the ducal families of Brunswick and Modena. She was given the name Benedetta ‘blessed’ after her maternal grandmother, Benedicta Henrietta of the Palatinate.

Her cousin James Francis Edward Stuart, then the Jacobite claimant to the thrones of England, Scotland, and Ireland, paid a visit to Modena in March 1717. He quickly fell in love with Benedetta and asked her to marry him. However, their union was seen as an undesirable entanglement by Rinaldo, who wanted to maintain good relations with George I. Rinaldo first insisted that the betrothal remain secret, and then definitively refused his consent to it in September 1717, while James was living in Urbino.

After the death of her father in October 1737, her younger brother Francesco succeeded him as Duke of Modena. Since her brother was absent from Modena fighting in the Russo-Turkish War, Benedetta and her younger sister Amalia assumed the regency of the duchies until the return of their brother in December.

Benedetta never married and had no children. She died on 16 September 1777 at Modena, aged 80. She was buried at San Vincenzo, Modena.
