= Francis II =

Francis II may refer to:

- Francis II, Duke of Brittany (1433–1488)
- Francesco II Gonzaga, Marquess of Mantua (1466–1519), ruler of the Italian city of Mantua
- Francis II of France (1544–1560), king of France
- Francis II, Duke of Lorraine (1572–1632), son of Charles III, Duke of Lorraine, and Claude of Valois
- Francesco II d'Este, Duke of Modena (1660–1694)
- Francis II Rákóczi (1676–1735), Prince of Transylvania
- Francis II, Holy Roman Emperor (1768–1835), last Holy Roman Emperor and first Austrian emperor
- Francis II of the Two Sicilies (1836–1894), last king of the Two Sicilies
- Franz, Duke of Bavaria (born 1933), called "Francis II" by supporters of the Jacobite claim to the thrones of England, Scotland, Ireland, and France
- Francis II, Duke of Saxe-Lauenburg (1547–1619), third son of Francis I of Saxe-Lauenburg and Sybille of Saxe-Freiberg

== See also ==
- Francesco II (disambiguation)
- Franz Joseph II, Prince of Liechtenstein
