= Duchess Charlotte Felicitas of Brunswick-Lüneburg =

Charlotte Felicitas
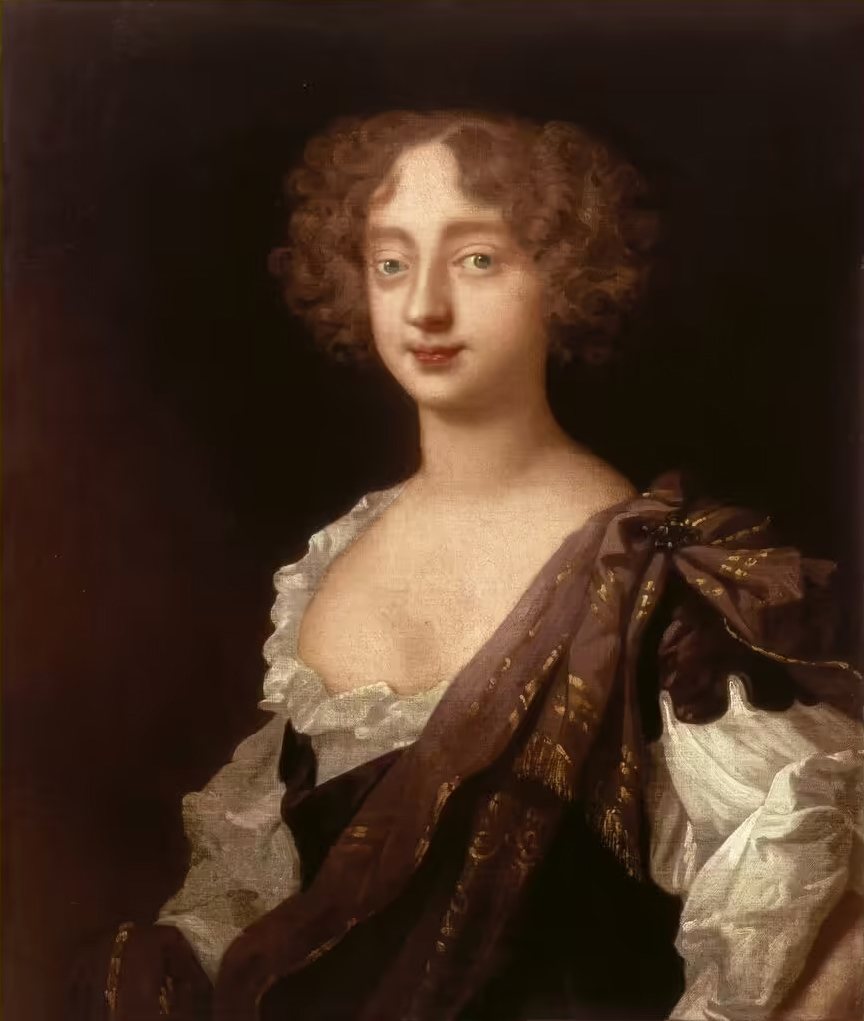
- Portrait by Henri Gascar

Duchess consort of Modena
- Tenure: 1 February 1696 – 29 September 1710
- Born: 6 March 1671; Hanover, Duchy of Brunswick-Lüneburg, Holy Roman Empire
- Died: 29 September 1710 (aged 39); Ducal Palace of Modena, Modena
- Spouse: Rinaldo d'Este, Duke of Modena (m. 1695)
- Issue Detail: Princess Benedetta; Francesco III d'Este, Duke of Modena; Princess Amalia, Marchioness of Villeneuf; Princee Gian Federico; Enrichetta, Duchess of Parma
- House: Hanover (by birth); Este (by marriage)
- Father: John Frederick, Duke of Brunswick-Lüneburg
- Mother: Benedicta Henrietta of the Palatinate
- Religion: Roman Catholicism

Charlotte Felicitas of Brunswick-Lüneburg (8 March 1671 – 29 September 1710) was a German princess. She was born into the House of Hanover and later married into the House of Este, which were both part of the House of Welf. She was thus the Duchess of Modena by marriage. She died in childbirth. Some sources refer to her simply as Charlotte.

== Biography ==
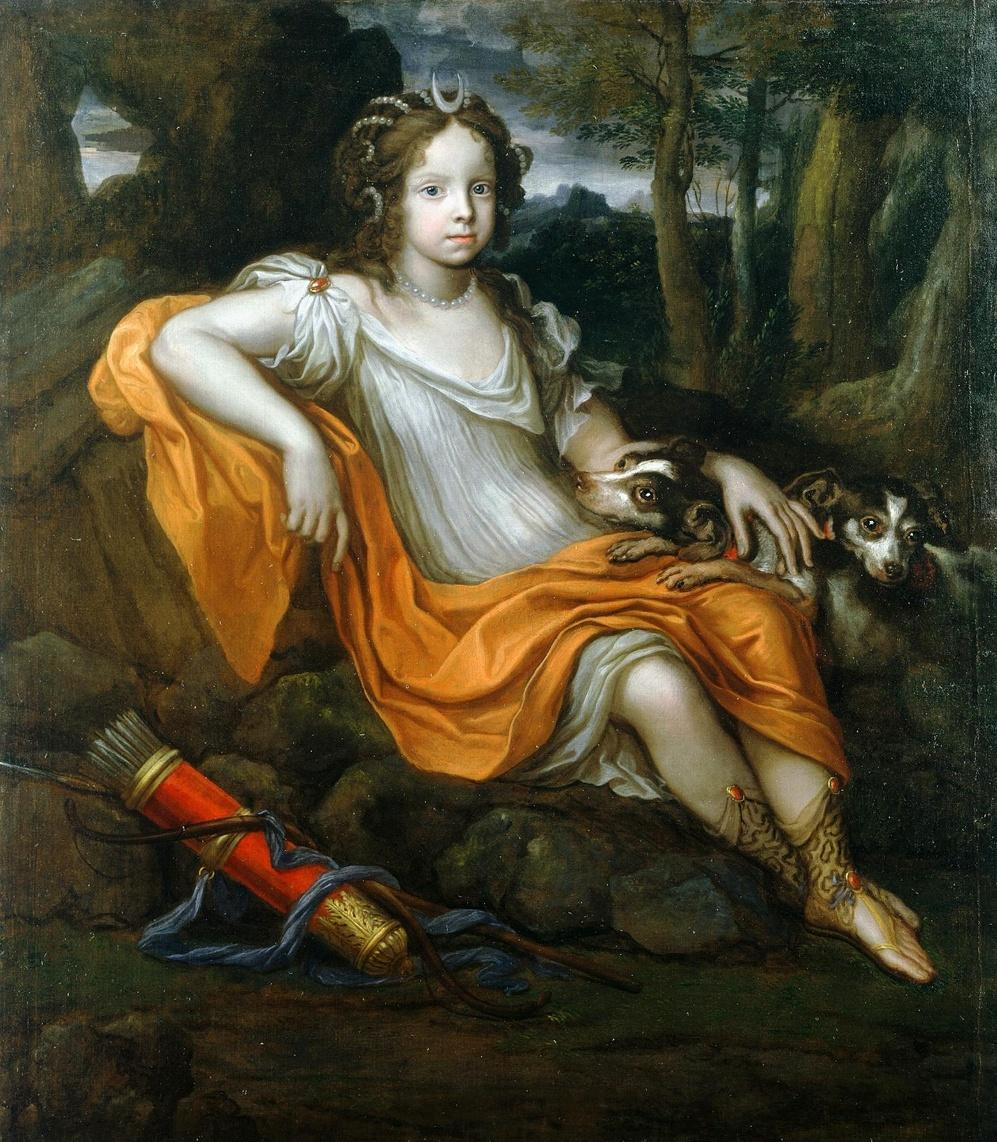
Young Charlotte Felicitas as Diana, painted by Jean Michelin

Born at Schloss Herrenhausen in Hanover, a palace later destroyed in World War II, she was the eldest surviving daughter (Note: An older sister, Anne Sophie died in 1672 at the age of 2) of John Frederick, Duke of Brunswick-Lüneburg and his wife, Benedicta Henrietta of the Palatinate. Her father had been the ruler of Brunswick-Lüneburg since 1665 and her parents had been married since 1668.

Charlotte Felicitas had an older sister, Princess Anna Sophie (who died in childhood), as well two younger sisters: Princess Henrietta (who died unmarried) and Princess Wilhelmina Amalia, who made a prestigious marriage in 1699 to the Holy Roman Emperor, Joseph I. After the death of her father in 1679, her mother returned to France, taking her three daughters with her. In France, Charlotte Felicitas and her sisters were given a Catholic education by her great-aunt Louise Hollandine at the convent of Maubuisson.

Charlotte Felicitas married Rinaldo d'Este in 1695. The youngest child of Francesco I d'Este, Duke of Modena and his third wife Lucrezia Barberini, Rinaldo had been created a cardinal in 1685, but he left the church in 1694 to succeed his nephew Francesco II d'Este as Duke of Modena. Rinaldo wanted to encourage relations between Modena and Brunswick, whose ruling house was the House of Hanover. The marriage was celebrated splendidly despite financial problems in Modena; the artist Marcantonio Franceschini was commissioned to paint a room, the Salone d'onore at the ducal palace in honour of the marriage.

Charlotte Felicitas fled Modena for Bologna in 1702 along with the rest of the Modenese royal family in order to avoid French troops in Italy due to the War of the Spanish Succession.

Her husband was sixteen years older than Charlotte Felicitas, but the two had seven children. After her death, her son Francesco, the ducal heir, married in 1721 Charlotte Aglaé d'Orléans, the daughter of Philippe II, Duke of Orléans, the Régent of France during the childhood of King Louis XV. Her third daughter, Enrichetta, went on to marry first in 1727 Antonio Farnese, Duke of Parma and, after his death in 1731, Leopold, Landgrave of Hesse-Darmstadt (1708-1764), Imperial Field Marshal, youngest surviving son of Philip of Hesse-Darmstadt and Princess Marie Ernestine of Croÿ (1673–1714).

Charlotte Felicitas died at the Ducal Palace of Modena after giving birth to a daughter in September 1710. The child also died. She was buried at the Church of San Vincenzo in Modena. Her son succeeded as Duke of Modena in 1737.

== Issue ==
- Princess Benedetta d'Este (18 Aug 1697 – 16 September 1777) died unmarried;
- Francesco III d'Este (2 July 1698 – 22 February 1780) future Duke of Modena; married Charlotte Aglaé d'Orléans and had issue;
- Princess Amalia d'Este (28 Jul 1699 – 5 July 1778) married the Marquis de Villeneuf, had no issue;
- Gian Federico d'Este (1 September 1700 – 24 April 1727)
- Princess Enrichetta d'Este (27 May 1702 – 30 January 1777) married Antonio Farnese, Duke of Parma had no issue; married Leopold, Landgrave of Hesse-Darmstadt, grandson of Louis VI, Landgrave of Hesse-Darmstadt, had no issue;
- Clemente d'Este (20 April 1708 – 23 April 1708) died in infancy;
- X d'Este (September 1710) female, died at birth;

== Ancestry ==
Ancestors of Duchess Charlotte Felicitas of Brunswick-Lüneburg

16. Ernest I, Duke of Brunswick-Lüneburg
8. William, Duke of Brunswick-Lüneburg
17. Sophia of Mecklenburg-Schwerin
4. George, Duke of Brunswick-Lüneburg
18. Christian III of Denmark
9. Princess Dorothea of Denmark
19. Dorothea of Saxe-Lauenburg
2. John Frederick, Duke of Brunswick-Lüneburg
20. George I, Landgrave of Hesse-Darmstadt
10. Louis V, Landgrave of Hesse-Darmstadt
21. Magdalena of Lippe
5. Anne Eleonore of Hesse-Darmstadt
22. John George, Elector of Brandenburg
11. Magdalene of Brandenburg
23. Elisabeth of Anhalt-Zerbst
1. Princess Charlotte Felicitas of Brunswick
24. Frederick IV, Elector Palatine
12. Frederick V of the Palatinate
25. Louise Juliana of Nassau
6. Edward, Count Palatine of Simmern
26. James VI and I of Scotland and England
13. Elizabeth Stuart
27. Anne of Denmark
3. Benedicta Henrietta of the Palatinate
28. Louis Gonzaga, Duke of Nevers
14. Charles I Gonzaga, Duke of Mantua
29. Henriette of Cleves
7. Anna Gonzaga
30. Charles of Lorraine, Duke of Mayenne
15. Catherine of Mayenne
31. Henriette de Savoie-Villars

== Bibliography ==
Taddei, Elena (2024). "An Intercultural Marriage and Experiences of Difference at the English Court: Mary of Modena (1658-1718) as a Carrier of Culture and Political Influencer". In Grüne, Niels; Ehrenpreis, Stefan (eds.). The British and German Worlds in an Age of Divergence (1600-1850). Routledge. pp. 227–247. doi:10.4324/9781003499190-9.

Duchess Charlotte Felicitas of Brunswick-Lüneburg House of Hanover Cadet branch of the House of Welf Born: 6 March 1671 Died: 29 September 1710
Royal titles
Vacant Title last held by Margherita Maria Farnese	Duchess consort of Modena; 11 February 1696 – 29 September 1710	Vacant Title next held by Charlotte Aglaé d'Orléans
