= Wilhelmine Amalie of Brunswick-Lüneburg =

Holy Roman Empress from 1705 to 1711

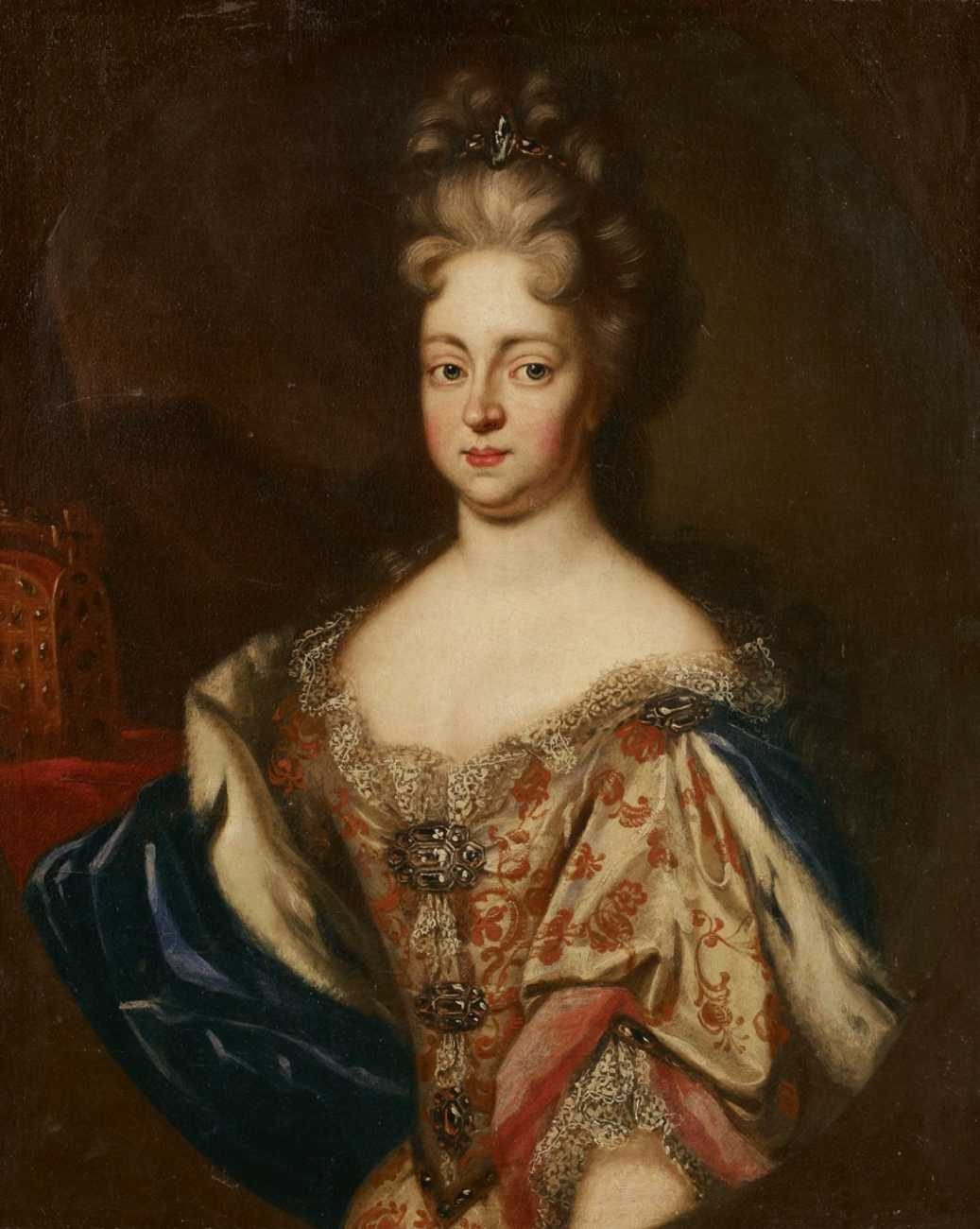
- Wilhelmine Amalie c. 1700

Holy Roman Empress
- Tenure: 5 May 1705 – 17 April 1711
- Born: 21 April 1673; Hanover, Duchy of Brunswick-Lüneburg, Holy Roman Empire
- Died: 10 April 1742 (aged 68); Vienna, Archduchy of Austria
- Burial: Salesian convent, Vienna
- Spouse: Joseph I, Holy Roman Emperor (m. 1699; died 1711)
- Issue: Maria Josepha, Queen of Poland; Archduke Leopold Joseph of Austria; Maria Amalia, Holy Roman Empress
- House: Hanover
- Father: John Frederick, Duke of Brunswick-Calenberg
- Mother: Benedicta Henrietta of the Palatinate

Wilhelmine Amalie of Brunswick-Lüneburg (21 April 1673 – 10 April 1742) was Holy Roman Empress, Queen of the Germans, Queen of Hungary, Queen of Bohemia, Archduchess consort of Austria etc. as the spouse of Joseph I, Holy Roman Emperor.

== Early life ==
Wilhelmine Amalie born on 21 April 1673, as the youngest daughter of John Frederick, Duke of Brunswick-Calenberg, and Princess Benedicta Henrietta of the Palatinate. Her two surviving sisters were Charlotte Felicitas, who married Rinaldo d'Este, Duke of Modena, and Henriette Marie, who died young. An older sister, Anna Sophie, died in childhood. After the death of her father in 1679, her mother returned to France, taking her three daughters with her. In France, Wilhelmine was given a Catholic education by her great-aunt Louise Hollandine at the convent of Maubuisson, and did not return to Hanover until she was 20 years old, in 1693.

Early on, the Holy Roman Empress Eleonore Magdalene of Neuburg decided that Wilhelmine Amalie would be her daughter-in-law. The Prince of Salm was instrumental in speaking for her candidacy. The adviser of Eleonore, Marco d'Aviano, had convinced her that Wilhelmine Amalie, being pious and older than Joseph, could act as a tempering influence and discontinue his sex life outside of marriage, and to Leopold, he claimed that he had a vision that the pair would be happy. She was subjected to medical examination, which established that she was fertile.

== Marriage ==
As a result, on 24 February 1699, she married Eleonore's son, Archduke Joseph, the heir of Emperor Leopold I. At their wedding, the opera Hercule and Hebe by Reinhard Keiser (1674–1739) was performed. Upon Joseph's succession as emperor in 1705, she became empress of the Holy Roman Empire.

They had three children:

- Archduchess Maria Josepha (8 December 1699 – 17 November 1757); married Augustus III, King of Poland and Grand Duke of Lithuania
- Archduke Leopold Joseph of Austria (29 October 1700 – 4 August 1701); died in infancy
- Archduchess Maria Amalia (22 October 1701 – 11 December 1756); she married Charles VII, Holy Roman Emperor

== Empress ==
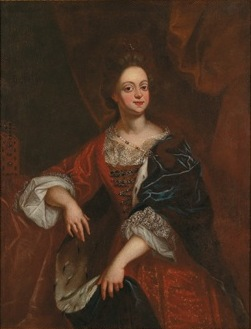
Empress Wilhelmine Amalie

Wilhelmine Amalie was described as beautiful but also as religious and serious. Her relationship with her husband was initially described as happy, but it soon deteriorated. Joseph had a long line of mistresses, both servants and nobles, such as Princess Dorothea Porcia (1683-1738), born Countess von und zu Daun. His hunting companion Count Johann Philip von Lamberg (1684-1735) provided him with lovers, and he eventually had a long-term relationship with Countess Marianne Pálffy of Erdöd (d. 1756), eldest daughter of Count János Pálffy, who became his official mistress. This was a scandal, as official mistresses had not been a custom at the Austrian court, and both Wilhelmine Amalie and the pope protested. Her mother-in-law supported her, scolding Joseph and placed his procurers in prison, but after he became emperor, nothing could be done. He had several illegitimate children, but no surviving male heir with his spouse. In 1704, Joseph contracted a venereal disease, reportedly from the daughter of a gardener, and passed the disease to his wife. Because of the prudishness of the Austrian court, she initially did not know what had happened to her and blamed herself for the infection. It has been suggested that this condition was the reason for the failure of the empress to produce more children after the birth of her second daughter. Without male heirs, a crisis developed in regards to the imperial succession.

As empress, Wilhelmine Amalie as well as her successor were described as accomplished in music, discretion, modesty and diligence, and was regarded to fulfill her representational role as empress well both within the Spanish court protocol of hunting and balls and amateur theater as well as the religious devotion days of pietas austriaca. Joseph did not allow her any political influence what so ever and kept her outside of state affairs as he did his mother and mistress Marianne Pàlffy, but she was described as intelligent and self-sufficient and she established political connections among the ministers, especially her relative Prince of Salm, whom she generally supported even when he promoted the interests of the Holy German Empire against Austria. She is described as an active participator in dynastic intrigue, and assisted in the marriage between her cousin and brother-in-law. She worked closely with the Hanoverian envoy to benefit interests of her family the Guelphs.

=== Empress Dowager ===
In 1711, Wilhelmine Amalie became a widow, after Joseph died of smallpox, and her mother-in-law became the interim regent until her brother-in-law, the Archduke Charles, could return from Spain where he was the Austrian nominee for the Spanish throne during the War of the Spanish Succession. At the death of her spouse, the stress caused the venereal disease of Wilhelmine Amalie to return in full force after several years remission.

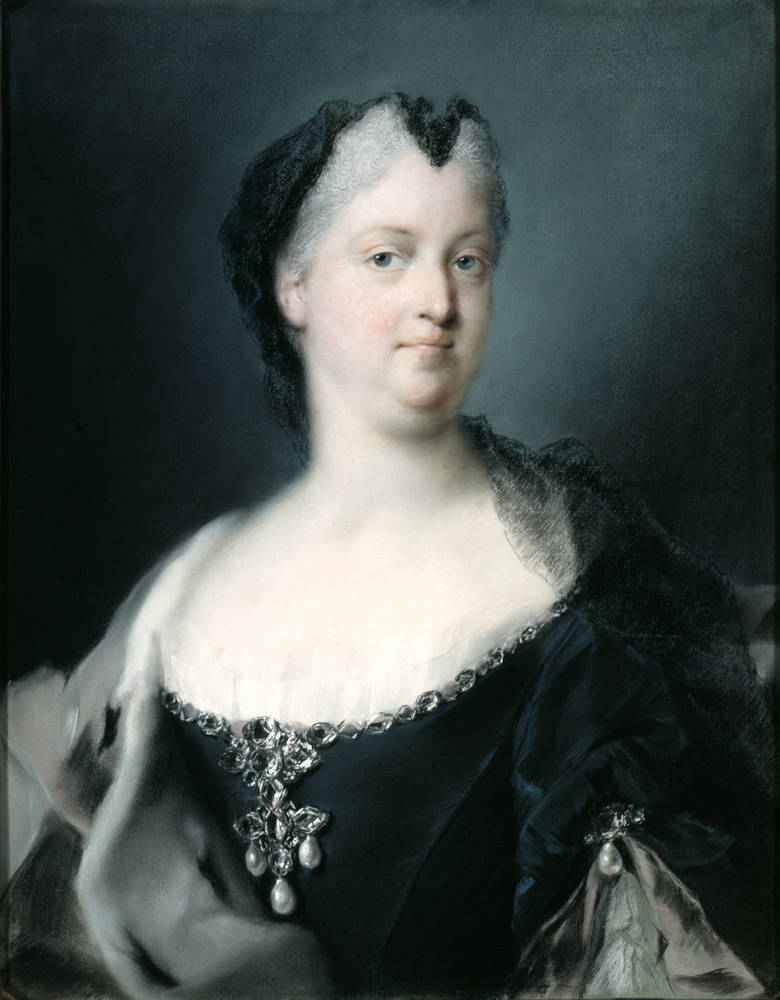
Wilhelmine Amalie as a widow, Rosalba Carriera, 1730

When Charles returned, he was elected as the new Holy Roman Emperor, Charles VI. His inability to produce male heirs irked Charles VI and eventually led to the promulgation of the Pragmatic Sanction of 1713, a document which abolished male-only succession and declared his lands indivisible. The new emperor favoured his own daughters over those of Joseph I and Wilhelmine Amalie, in the succession, ignoring the Mutual Pact of Succession he had signed during the reign of his father, Leopold I.

She as well as her mother-in-law was active in fighting for their daughter's right to the throne. By the secret pactum mutuae successionis of 1703, Leopold had made an agreement with his sons that the daughters of Joseph would be first in the line of succession, followed by those of Charles and Leopold, and though none of the empresses knew of the existence of the document, there had been talk of it, and Joseph had hinted about it to Wilhelmine Amalie. Baron Seilern apparently showed Wilhelmine Amalie the document before it was presented to the head of her family, the elector of Hanover. In 1712, the elector sent the famous Gottfried Leibniz to her to assist her in defending her daughters rights against Charles, and on 21 April 1713, Charles VI presented the Pragmatic Sanction in which he adjusted himself to the memorandum of Wilhelmine Amalie from the document of pactum mutuae successionis, after which she celebrated with a dinner for the empresses and archduchesses at the table of Empress Dowager Eleanore, where she was congratulated on her success and answered that she hoped the emperor would have a son. In 1715, however, her supporter Seilern died, and in 1717, Charles VI changed the terms of the Pragmatic Sanction to favor his daughters over hers. She did not approve, but did not openly protest.

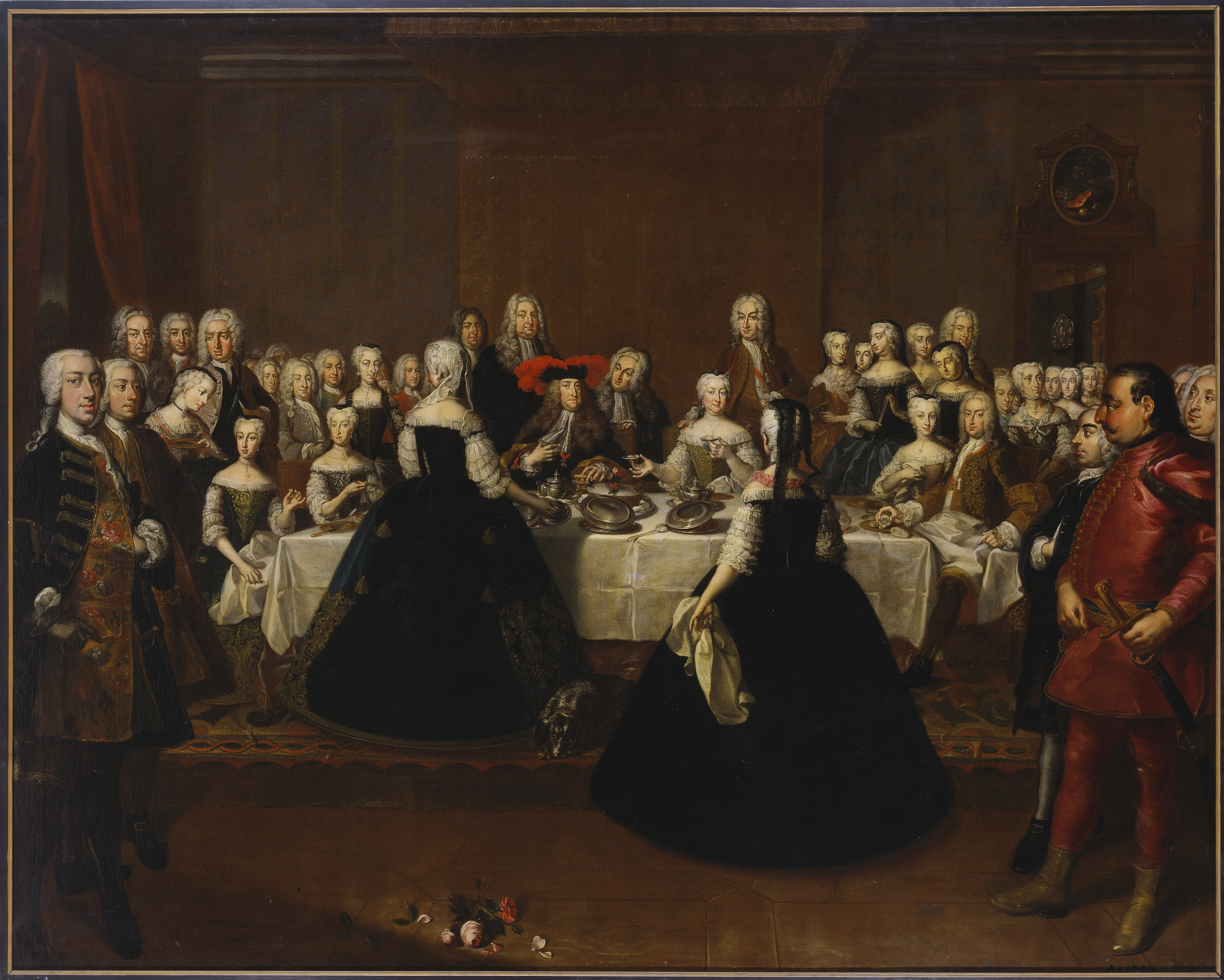
Wedding breakfast of Maria Theresa of Austria and Francis of Lorraine, with the Dowager Empress Wilhelmine Amalie in attendance at the left side of the table, c. 1736

In 1722, after her daughters were married, Wilhelmine Amalie retired to a convent that she had founded earlier in 1717, the Salesianerinnenkloster auf dem Rennwege in Vienna. The convent did not mean a retreat from social life, as she was in fact very active as a dowager, regularly leaving the convent for family visits as well as representational visits. It was as an empress dowager that she had her greatest impact upon cultural life in Vienna. Her medical prescriptions in her care for the sick was recommended, and she founded a boarding school as well as one of Vienna's first orphanages for girls. She admired Francois de Sales and Jeanne Francoise Fremont de Chantal, and helped promote her canonisation. She was also a patron of the Catholic reformer Lodovico Antonio Muratori.

Wilhelmine Amalie got along very well with her mother-in-law Eleonore and her sister-in-law Elisabeth Christine as well as with the archduchesses, and the three empresses were described as supportive toward each other: Wilhelmine Amalie nursed Elisabeth Christine when she had smallpox, and Elisabeth Christine nursed Eleanor during her last illness.

In 1740, Charles VI died. During the War of the Austrian Succession, Wilhelmine Amalie initially supported her son-in-law, Charles Albert, Elector of Bavaria, in his pursuit of the imperial crown, but soon retired again to private life. In June 1741, Empress Maria Theresa visited her and asked her to act as a mediator between herself and her son-in-law the Bavarian elector, but she refused.

Wilhelmine Amalie outlived her spouse by more than 30 years, dying on 10 April 1742. She is buried in the Salesian convent in Vienna. Her heart is buried in the Imperial Crypt.

Wilhelmine Amalie of Brunswick-Lüneburg House of Hanover Born: 21 April 1673 Died: 10 April 1742
German royalty
| Preceded by Eleonore Magdalene of Neuburg | Holy Roman Empress; 1705–1711 | Succeeded by Elisabeth Christine of Brunswick |
| Preceded by Eleonore Magdalene of Neuburg | German Queen; 1699–1711 | Succeeded by Elisabeth Christine of Brunswick |
| Preceded by Eleonore Magdalene of Neuburg | Queen consort of Bohemia; 1705–1711 | Succeeded by Elisabeth Christine of Brunswick |
| Preceded by Eleonore Magdalene of Neuburg | Queen consort of Hungary and Croatia; 1699–1711 | Succeeded by Elisabeth Christine of Brunswick |
| Preceded by Eleonore Magdalene of Neuburg | Archduchess consort of Austria; 1705–1711 | Succeeded by Elisabeth Christine of Brunswick |
