= Francesco II =

Francesco II may refer to:

- Francesco II Ordelaffi (1300–1386)
- Francesco II of Lesbos (c. 1365 – 1403/1404)
- Francesco II Acciaioli (died 1460), last Duke of Athens
- Francesco II Gonzaga, Marquess of Mantua (1466–1519), ruler of the Italian city of Mantua
- Francesco II Sforza (1495–1535), Duke of Milan from 1521 until his death
- Francesco II d'Este, Duke of Modena (1660–1694), Duke of Modena and Reggio from 1662 to 1694
- Francesco II of the Two Sicilies (1836–1894)
