= Béatrice Hiéronyme de Lorraine =

French abbess (1662–1738)

Béatrice Hiéronyme
- Abbess of Remiremont
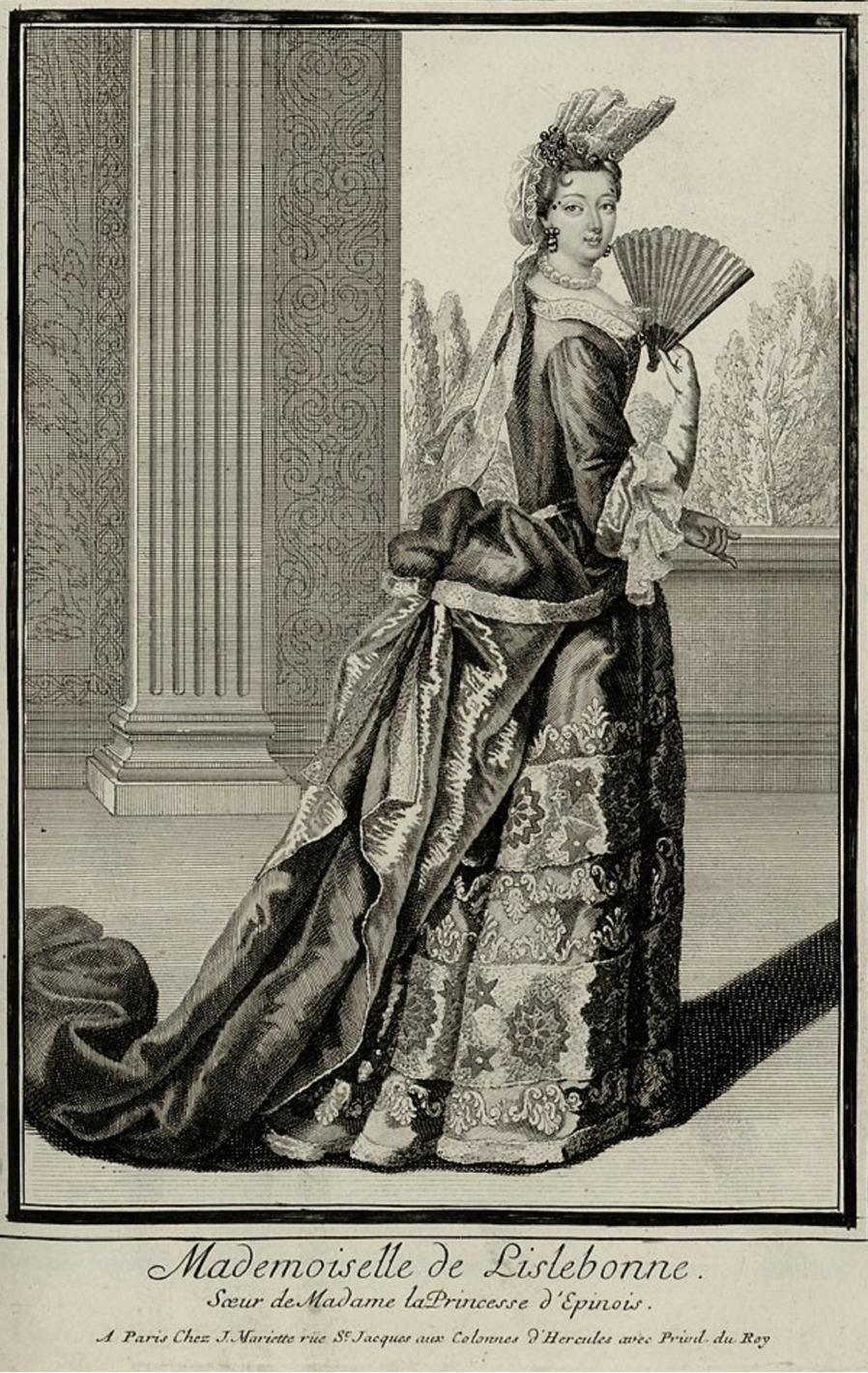
- Born: 1 July 1662
- Died: 9 February 1738 (aged 75); Paris, France
- Béatrice Hiéronyme de Lorraine
- House: Lorraine
- Father: François Marie, Prince of Lillebonne
- Mother: Anne de Lorraine

Béatrice Hiéronyme de Lorraine (1 July 1662 – 9 February 1738) was a member of the House of Lorraine and was the Abbess of Remiremont. She was a member of the household of Le Grand Dauphin and was the supposed wife of her cousin the Chevalier de Lorraine. She died childless.

== Biography ==
Béatrice Hiéronyme was the eldest daughter of François Marie de Lorraine, Prince de Lillebonne and his second wife Anne de Lorraine. She never married. Known as Mademoiselle de Lillebonne in her youth, she was a member of the Household of Louis, le Grand Dauphin before she took a religious path in life. She was very close to her sister Élisabeth.

While in the household of the Dauphin, she became close to Louise Françoise de Bourbon known as Madame la Duchesse. She was also close to her uncle Charles Henri, Prince of Vaudémont and the Duke of Vendôme.

A member of the House of Guise founded by Claude, Duke of Guise, he was a Prince of Lorraine as a male line descendant of René II, Duke of Lorraine. At court, she, like his Lorraine family, held the rank of Foreign Prince, a rank which was below that of the immediate Royal Family and Princes of the Blood.

In 1686, she was a proposed bride of Francesco II d'Este, Duke of Modena. Louis XIV had initially supported the marriage but later said he would not involve himself in the union. Instead, Francesco married Margherita Maria Farnese and never had any children.

Her paternal first cousins included the Chevalier de Lorraine (lover of Philippe I, Duke of Orléans), Count of Armagnac; her maternal cousins included Louis XIV of France and the above-mentioned Duke of Orléans.

She was made the coadjutrice of Remiremont in 1705; In 1710, she became the Abbess of Remiremont, a prestigious Benedictine abbey near Remiremont, Vosges, France. Taking over from Christina of Salm, she would remain the Princess-Abbess till her death in 1738.

She died in Paris. Saint-Simon said that she married her cousin Philippe, Chevalier de Lorraine.

== Ancestry ==
Ancestors of Béatrice Hiéronyme de Lorraine

16. René de Lorraine, Marquis of Elbeuf
8. Charles de Lorraine, Duke of Elbeuf
17. Louise de Rieux
4. Charles de Lorraine, Duke of Elbeuf
18. Léonor Chabot, count of Charny
9. Marguerite de Chabot
19. Françoise de Longwy
2. François Marie de Lorraine, Prince de Lillebonne
20. Antoine de Bourbon, King of Navarre
10. Henry IV of France
21. Jeanne III of Navarre
5. Catherine Henriette de Bourbon, Légitimée de France
22. Antoine d'Estrées
11. Gabrielle d'Estrées
23. Françoise Babou de La Bourdaisière
1. Béatrice Hiéronyme de Lorraine
24. Charles III, Duke of Lorraine
12. Francis II, Duke of Lorraine
25. Claude of Valois
6. Charles IV, Duke of Lorraine
26. Paul of Salm-Brandenburg
13. Christina of Salm
27. Marie Le Veneur de Tillières
3. Anne de Lorraine
28. Evandelin-Simon de Cusance
14. Claude-François de Cusance
29. Béatrice de Vergy
7. Béatrice de Cusance
30. Jean de Witthem
15. Ernestine van Witthem
31. Maria Margaretha van Merode

== Sources ==
- Georges Poull, La maison ducale de Lorraine, 1991
