= John Frederick, Duke of Brunswick =

John Frederick
- Duke of Brunswick-Lüneburg; Prince of Calenberg
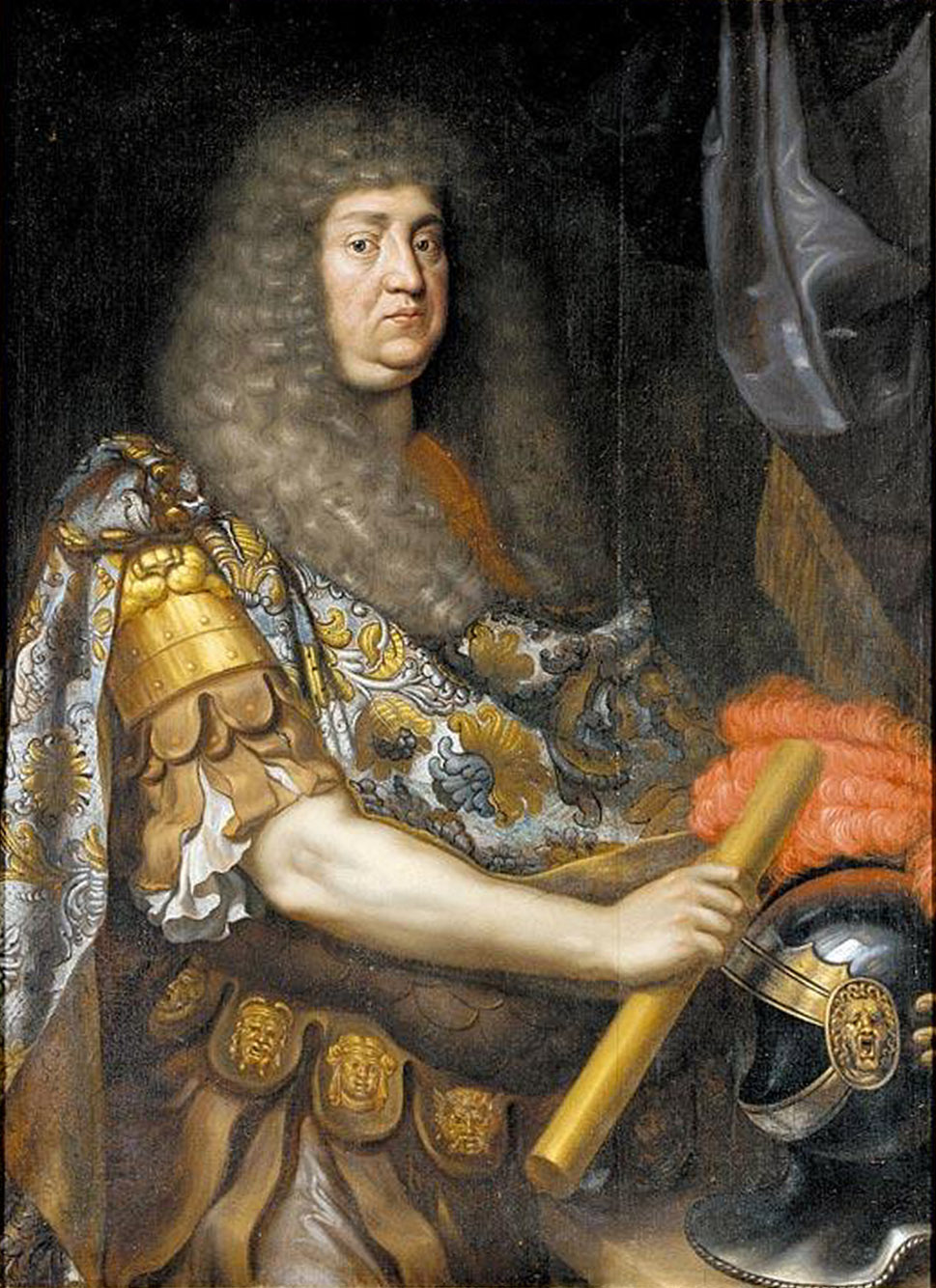
- Born: 25 April 1625; Herzberg am Harz, Göttingen, Principality of Calenberg, Kingdom of Germany
- Died: 18 December 1679 (aged 54); Mixed Imperial City of Augsburg, Kingdom of Germany
- Spouse: Benedicta Henrietta of the Palatinate (m. 1668)
- Issue: Princess Charlotte Felicitas of Brunswick-Lüneburg; Wilhelmina Amalia, Holy Roman Empress
- House: Hanover
- Father: George, Duke of Brunswick-Lüneburg
- Mother: Anne Eleonore of Hesse-Darmstadt

John Frederick (German: Johann Friedrich; 25 April 1625 in Herzberg am Harz – 18 December 1679 in Augsburg) was duke of Brunswick-Lüneburg. He ruled over the Principality of Calenberg, a subdivision of the duchy, from 1665 until his death.

The third son of George, Duke of Brunswick-Lüneburg, John converted to the Catholic Church, the only member of his family to do so, in 1651, after witnessing Joseph of Cupertino miraculously levitate while in Italy in 1649. He received Calenberg when his elder brother George William inherited the Principality of Lüneburg. In 1666, he had a palace built in Herrenhausen near Hanover that was inspired by the Palace of Versailles and is famous for its gardens, the Herrenhausen Gardens.

In 1667, he employed as his master builder the Venetian architect Girolamo Sartorio, who designed many buildings in the town, including the Neustädter Kirche, and was instrumental in the expansion of the Herrenhausen Gardens.

In 1676, John Frederick employed Gottfried Wilhelm Leibniz as Privy Councillor and librarian of the important ducal library. Thus began Leibniz's 40-year association with the House of Hanover, which resulted in three generations of Hanovers being patrons to one of the most eminent philosophers and mathematicians of Europe.

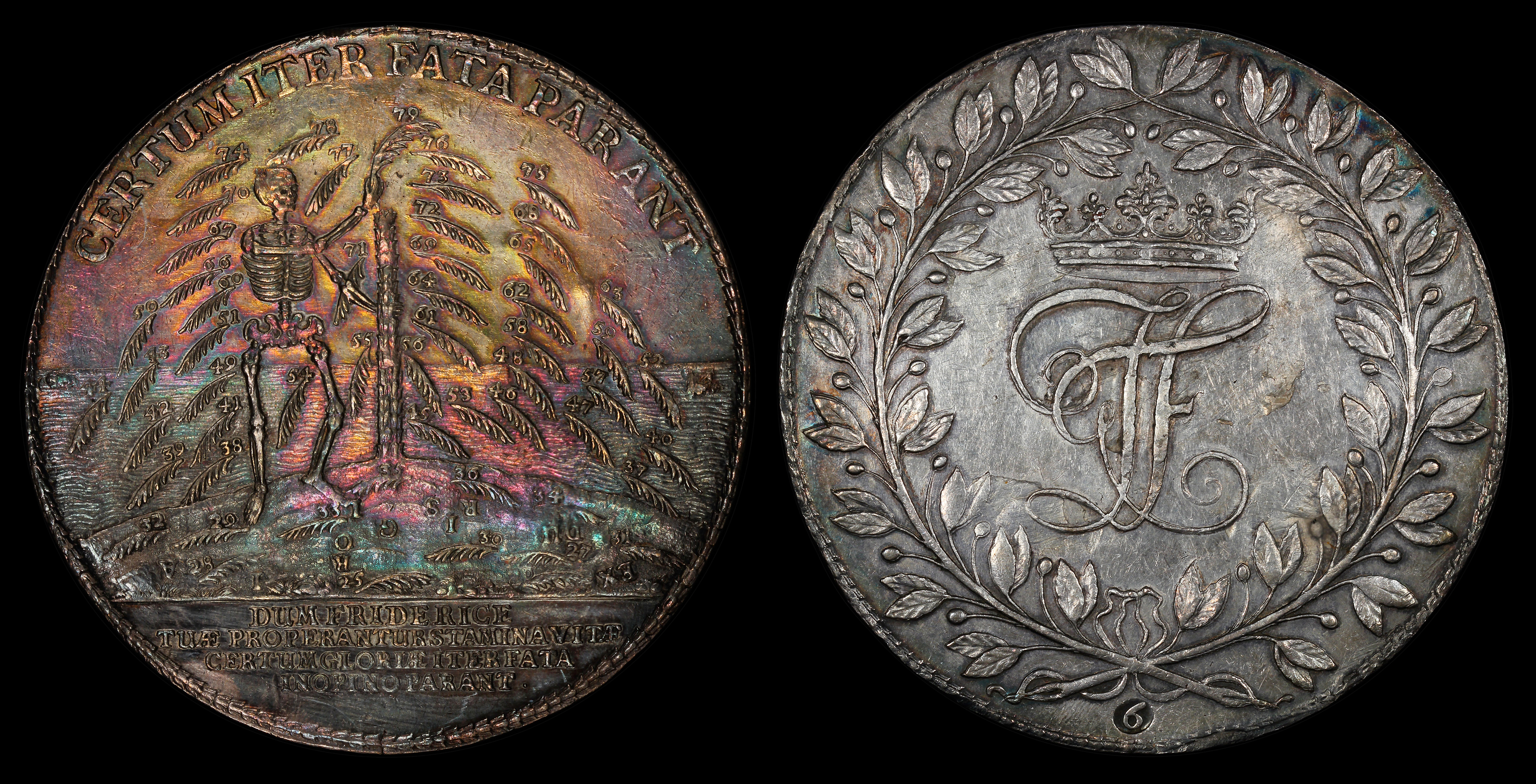
Funeral thaler for John Frederick, 1679

== Children ==
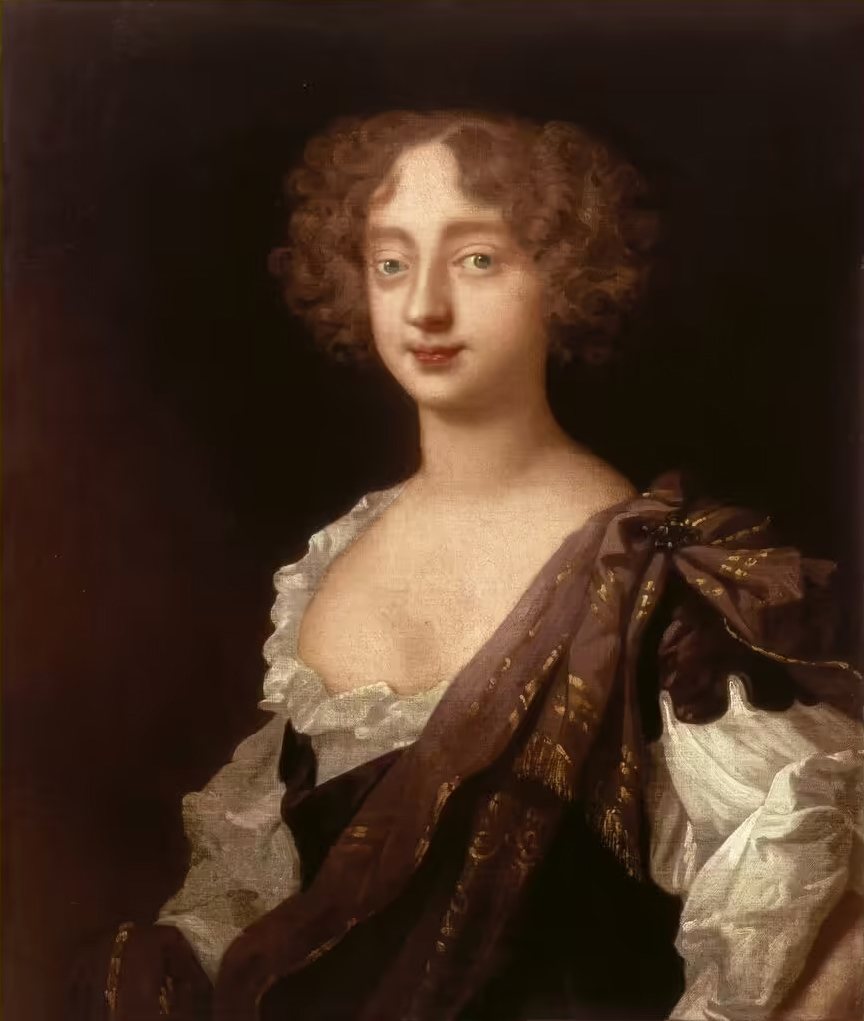
Charlotte Felicitas, his middle daughter

John Frederick married Benedicta Henrietta of the Palatinate, daughter of Edward, Count Palatine of Simmern and Anna Gonzaga, on 30 November 1668. They had four daughters:

- Anna Sophie (10 February 1670 – 24 March 1672), died in childhood;
- Charlotte Felicitas (8 March 1671 – 29 September 1710), married Rinaldo d'Este, Duke of Modena
- Henriette Maria (9 March 1672 – 4 September 1687), died unmarried;
- Wilhelmina Amalia (1673 – 10 April 1742), married Joseph I, Holy Roman Emperor

== Ancestry ==
Ancestors of John Frederick, Duke of Brunswick

8. Ernest I, Duke of Brunswick-Lüneburg
4. William, Duke of Brunswick-Lüneburg
9. Sophia of Mecklenburg-Schwerin
2. George, Duke of Brunswick-Lüneburg
10. Christian III of Denmark
5. Dorothea of Denmark
11. Dorothea of Saxe-Lauenburg
1. John Frederick, Duke of Brunswick-Lüneburg
12. George I, Landgrave of Hesse-Darmstadt
6. Louis V, Landgrave of Hesse-Darmstadt
13. Magdalene of Lippe
3. Anne Eleonore of Hesse-Darmstadt
14. John George, Elector of Brandenburg
7. Magdalena von Brandenburg
15. Elisabeth of Anhalt-Zerbst

== Notes ==
John Frederick, Duke of Brunswick House of Hanover Cadet branch of the House of Welf Born: 25 April 1625 Died: 18 December 1679
German nobility
Preceded by George William	Duke of Brunswick-Lüneburg; Prince of Calenberg; 1665–1679	Succeeded by Ernest Augustus
