= Benedicta Henrietta of the Palatinate =

Benedicta Henrietta of Hanover
- Duchess of Brunswick-Lüneburg
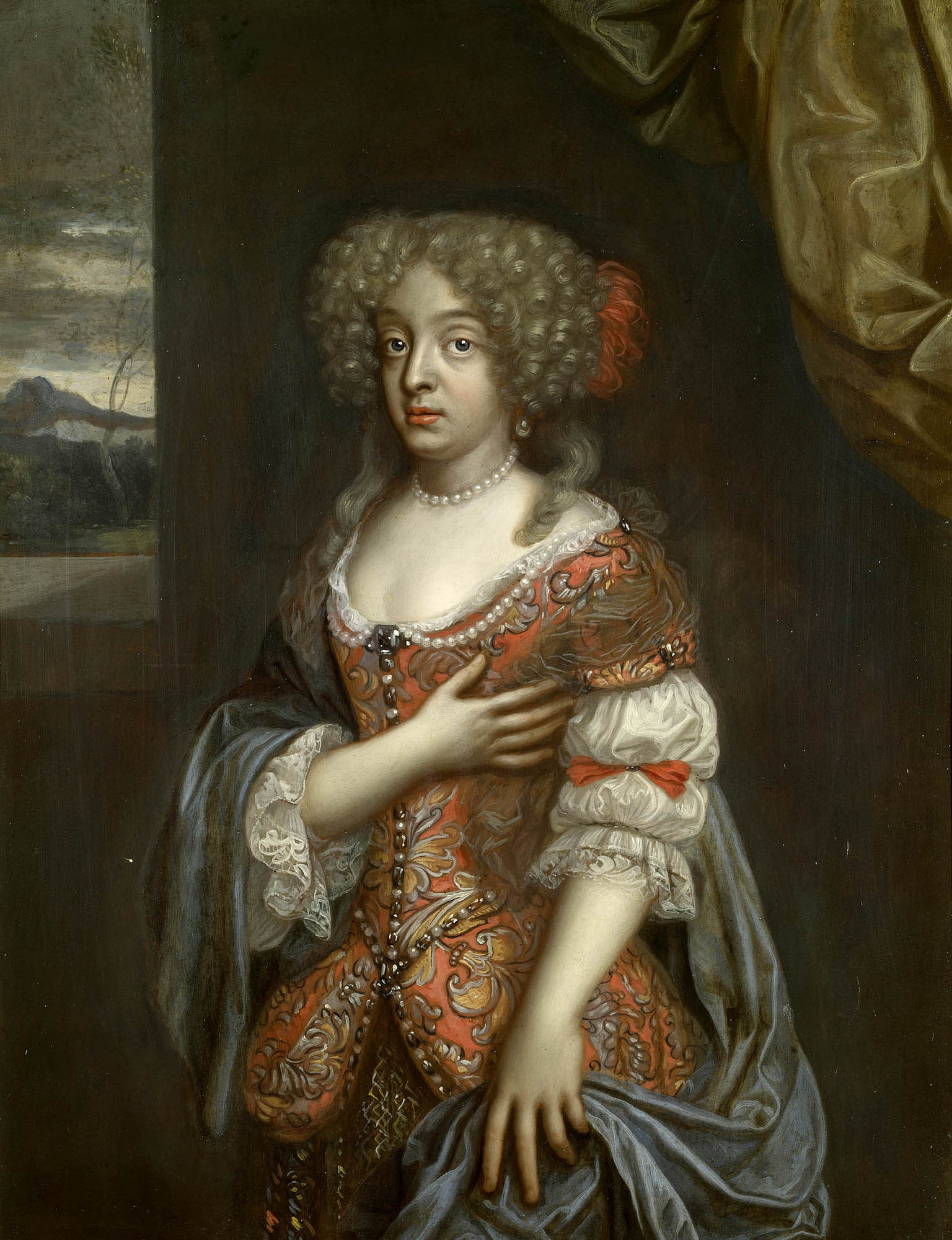
- Portrait c. 1680
- Born: 14 March 1652; Paris, France
- Died: 12 August 1730 (aged 78); Asnieres-sur-Seine, France
- Spouse: John Frederick, Duke of Brunswick-Lüneburg (m. 1668; died 1679)
- Issue Detail: Duchess Anne Sophie; Charlotte, Duchess of Modena; Duchess Henriette Maria; Wilhelmine, Holy Roman Empress
- House: Palatinate-Simmern (by birth); Hanover (by marriage)
- Father: Edward, Prince Palatine
- Mother: Anna Gonzaga

Princess Palatine Benedicta Henrietta (Benedicta Henrietta Philippina; 14 March 1652 – 12 August 1730) was Duchess of Brunswick-Lüneburg, or of Hanover, by her marriage to Duke John Frederick. She was the third and youngest daughter of Prince Palatine Edward and the political hostess Anna Gonzaga.

== Life ==
Born in Paris to the landless Prince Palatine Edward, Bénédicte Henriette's paternal grandparents were Frederick V, Elector Palatine and Elizabeth Stuart, the Winter Queen. Her maternal grandparents were Charles I, Duke of Mantua and Montferrat and his French wife Catherine de Mayenne, daughter of Charles de Lorraine-Guise, Duke of Mayenne. She was the youngest of three daughters.

Bénédicte was reared by Louise de La Fayette, a courtier-turned-nun known as Sister Louise-Angélique.

=== Duchess of Brunswick-Lüneburg ===
She was married at the age of sixteen to a distant cousin, John Frederick, Duke of Brunswick-Lüneburg, who was the same age as her father, and childless. They were married on 30 November 1668. The union, which had been arranged by the French diplomatist Gourville, produced four daughters, only two of whom lived to mature adulthood.

John Frederick died in 1679 without a male heir, and the duchy of Brunswick was inherited by his Protestant younger brother, Ernest Augustus, the husband of Benedicta Henrietta's paternal aunt, Sophia of Hanover, and father of George I of Great Britain. After her husband's death, Benedicta returned to her native France and resided there with her sister, the princess of Condé.

She corresponded with Gottfried Leibniz.

Benedicta died the age of 78, at Asnieres, her late sister's residence near Paris, on 12 August 1730.

== Issue ==
- Anna Sophie of Brunswick-Lüneburg (10 February 1670 – 24 March 1672), died in childhood;
- Charlotte Felizitas of Brunswick-Lüneburg (8 March 1671 – 29 September 1710), married Rinaldo d'Este, Duke of Modena, and had issue;
- Henriette Maria of Brunswick-Lüneburg (9 March 1672 – 4 September 1687), died unmarried;
- Wilhelmine Amalia of Brunswick-Lüneburg (21 April 1673 – 10 April 1742), married Joseph I, Holy Roman Emperor and had issue.

== Ancestry ==
Ancestors of Benedicta Henrietta of the Palatinate

8. Frederick IV, Elector Palatine
4. Frederick V, Elector Palatine
9. Countess Louise Juliana of Nassau
2. Prince Palatine Edward
10. James I of England
5. Elizabeth Stuart
11. Anne of Denmark
1. Princess Palatine Benedicta Henrietta
12. Louis Gonzaga, Duke of Nevers
6. Charles I, Duke of Mantua and Montferrat
13. Henriette of Cleves, Duchess of Nevers
3. Anna Gonzaga
14. Charles of Lorraine, Duke of Mayenne
7. Catherine of Mayenne
15. Henriette de Savoie, Marquise de Villars

== Sources ==
- Bougaud, Emile. St. Chantal and the Foundation of the Visitation. Vol. 2. New York: Benziger Brothers, 1895. Google Books. Web.

German nobility
Preceded by Sophia Dorothea of Schleswig-Holstein-Sonderburg-Glücksburg	Duchess consort of Brunswick-Lüneburg; 1668–1679; Served alongside: Éléonore Desmier d'Olbreuse	Vacant Title next held by Sophia of Hanover
