= Archduke Leopold Joseph of Austria =

Archduke Leopold Joseph of Austria may refer to:

- Archduke Leopold Joseph of Austria (1682–1684), son of Leopold I, Holy Roman Emperor
- Archduke Leopold Joseph of Austria (1700–1701), son of Joseph I, Holy Roman Emperor
