= Margherita Maria Farnese =

- Duchess of Modena and Reggio
- Born: 24 November 1664; Parma
- Died: 17 June 1718 (aged 53); Ducal Palace of Colorno, Colorno
- Burial: Sanctuary of Santa Maria della Steccata, Parma
- Spouse: Francesco II d'Este, Duke of Modena
- Father: Ranuccio II Farnese, Duke of Parma
- Mother: Isabella d'Este

Margherita Maria Farnese (24 November 1664 – 17 June 1718) was an Italian noblewoman born into the House of Farnese. She was the Duchess of Modena and Reggio by marriage to her first cousin Francesco II d'Este, Duke of Modena. Her niece was Elisabeth Farnese, wife of Philip V of Spain.

== Biography ==
Margherita Maria was the eldest child of Ranuccio II Farnese, Duke of Parma and his second wife Isabella d'Este. Her mother died in childbirth in 1666 after giving birth to Odoardo, Hereditary Prince of Parma (father of the famous Elisabeth Farnese, Queen of Spain). She was described as 'lively and penetrating of spirit and has extremely engaging manners' by Emanuele Filiberto, Prince of Carignano.

Her father Ranuccio had previously been married to Margaret Yolande of Savoy but the marriage produced no surviving issue; as such, Margherita Maria was the first of Ranuccio's children to survive infancy. Her younger half brothers Francesco Farnese and Antonio Farnese were successively the rulers of Parma. When the latter died, the House of Farnese became extinct.

Her father married her aunt Maria d'Este with whom he had nine further children. She was married to her cousin Francesco II d'Este, Duke of Modena who had previously been part of a Franco-Modenese alliance proposed with Francesco and a princess of Lorraine named Béatrice Hiéronyme de Lorraine but the marriage never materialised.

Francesco was the son of the late Alfonso IV d'Este, Duke of Modena and Laura Martinozzi, niece of Cardinal Mazarin. He was also the brother of Mary of Modena, second wife of James II of England

She married Francesco 14 July 1692 in Parma. The couple had no children, Francesco dying in 1694 after just two years of marriage of gout and polyarthritis. The widowed Duchess of Modena retired to her native Parma where she died in the summer of 1718 at the Ducal Palace of Colorno, the summer residence of the Farnese. She was buried at the Sanctuary of Santa Maria della Steccata in Parma.

== Ancestors ==
Ancestors of Margherita Maria Farnese

8. Ranuccio I Farnese, Duke of Parma
4. Odoardo Farnese, Duke of Parma
9. Margherita Aldobrandini
2. Ranuccio II Farnese, Duke of Parma
10. Cosimo II de' Medici, Grand Duke of Tuscany
5. Margherita de' Medici
11. Maria Maddalena of Austria
1. Margherita Maria Farnese
12. Alfonso III d'Este, Duke of Modena
6. Francesco I d'Este, Duke of Modena
13. Isabella of Savoy
3. Isabella d'Este, Duchess of Parma
14. Ranuccio I Farnese, Duke of Parma (= 8)
7. Maria Caterina Farnese
15. Margherita Aldobrandini (= 9)
