= Rinaldo d'Este (1655–1737) =

Duke of Modena and Reggio from 1694 to 1737

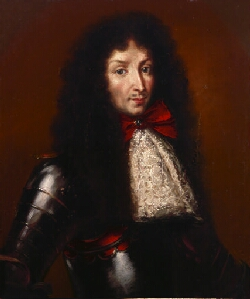
- Portrait by Benedetto Gennari II

Duke of Modena and Reggio
- Reign: 6 September 1694 – 26 October 1737
- Predecessor: Francesco II d'Este
- Successor: Francesco III d'Este
- Born: 26 April 1655; Ducal Palace, Modena
- Died: 26 October 1737 (aged 82); Ducal Palace, Modena
- Spouse: Charlotte Felicitas of Brunswick-Lüneburg (m. 1696; died 1710)
- Issue Detail: Princess Benedetta; Francesco III, Duke of Modena; Princess Amalia, Marchioness of Villeneuf; Prince Gian Federico; Enrichetta, Duchess of Parma; Rinaldo de Reggio (ill.)
- House: Este
- Father: Francesco I d'Este, Duke of Modena
- Mother: Lucrezia Barberini
- Religion: Roman Catholicism

Rinaldo d'Este (25 April 1655 – 26 October 1737) was Duke of Modena and Reggio from 1694 until his death, as well as a member of the House of Este. He attempted to expand his holdings by siding with the Holy Roman Empire during the War of the Spanish Succession and the War of the Polish Succession, though his gains only consisted of the Duchy of Mirandola and the county of Novellara and Bagnolo. Rinaldo married his oldest son Francesco to the regent of France's daughter in an attempt to improve diplomatic relations with France. He died in 1737 and was succeeded by his son, Francesco.

== Biography ==
Born 25 April 1655, at the Ducal Palace of Modena, Rinaldo was the son of Francesco I d'Este, Duke of Modena and Lucrezia Barberini, daughter of Taddeo Barberini and Anna Colonna. Created cardinal on 2 September 1686, he aided in the elections of Popes Alexander VIII and Innocent XII. Rinaldo left the ecclesiastical career in 1694 to succeed his nephew Francesco II as duke.

Rinaldo married Princess Charlotte Felicitas of Brunswick-Lüneburg (1671–1710), eldest daughter of Johann Friedrich, Duke of Brunswick-Lüneburg and Benedicta Henrietta of the Palatinate, on 11 February 1696. He wanted to encourage relations between Modena and Brunswick, whose ruling house was the House of Hanover. Rinaldo hoped that this marriage to a German princess would provide him needed support from the various German royal houses, including the Habsburgs, who were connected to his wife by blood. The marriage was celebrated splendidly despite financial problems in Modena; the artist Marcantonio Franceschini was commissioned to paint a room, the Salone d'onore at the ducal palace in honour of the marriage.

== Duke ==
Rinaldo's first act as duke was to reduce the price of the grain and to improve the conditions of life of the peasants. At the outbreak of the War of Spanish Succession (1702), he feigned neutrality but allowed Prince Eugene of Savoy to occupy the fortress of Brescello. This did not prevent the French troops from capturing Modena, forcing Rinaldo to flee to Bologna. In November 1706, Rinaldo, as part of the Imperial army, was restored to Modena. In the resulting peace treaty, Rinaldo acquired the Duchy of Mirandola.

Rinaldo's wife, Charlotte, died at the Ducal Palace of Modena after giving birth to a daughter on 29 December 1710. (Note: Matteo Al Kalak, Professor of Early Modern History, states Charlotte died on 29 September 1710 in childbirth.) The child also died. She was buried at the Church of San Vincenzo in Modena.

In 1720, Rinaldo attempted to establish friendlier relationship with France by marrying his son Francesco to Charlotte Aglaé d'Orléans, the daughter of Philippe d'Orléans, Duke of Orléans, Regent of France. Charlotte Aglaé received an enormous dowry of 1.8 million livres, half of which was contributed in the name of the young king, Louis XV, on orders of the Regent. From her adopted country, Charlotte Aglaé received a trousseau consisting of diamonds and portraits of her future husband.

In order to keep peace at court, Rinaldo had to build a separate residence for them in Rivalta, near Reggio Emilia. He also failed in an attempt to obtain the Duchy of Parma through the marriage of his daughter, Enrichetta, with Antonio Farnese, Duke of Parma. When the duke died without an heir, Elisabeth Farnese, the Queen of Spain, acquired the duchy for her son, Charles III of Spain, a member of the House of Bourbon.

In 1734, during the War of Polish Succession, Rinaldo financially supported an Austrian commander and aided the Imperial army with auxiliary troops. He moved to Bologna, expecting French retaliation. The peace treaty in 1736 was favourable for the Este, who obtained the county of Novellara and Bagnolo.

Rinaldo died on 26 October 1737. He was succeeded by his son Francesco as Duke of Modena.

== Issue ==
Rinaldo and Charlotte had:

- Benedetta Maria Ernesta d'Este (18 Aug 1697 – 16 September 1777), died unmarried and without issue.
- Francesco d'Este (2 July 1698 – 22 February 1780), future Duke of Modena; married Charlotte Aglaé d'Orléans
- Amalia Giuseppina d'Este (28 Jul 1699 – 5 July 1778), married the Marquis of Villeneuf, had no issue.
- Gian Federico d'Este (1 September 1700 – 24 April 1727)
- Princess Enrichetta d'Este (27 May 1702 – 30 January 1777), married Antonio Farnese, Duke of Parma had no issue; married Leopold, Landgrave of Hesse-Darmstadt
- Clemente d'Este (20 April 1708 – ), joined ecclesiastical order 1719
- X d'Este (September 1710), female, died at birth.

The duke also had an illegitimate son:

- Rinaldo de Reggio, Chevalier de Reggio, married Félicité De Canapan

== Sources ==
- Al Kalak, Matteo (2016). "Rinaldo I d'Este, duca di Modena e Reggio". Dizionario Biografico degli Italiani (in Italian). Vol. 87. Istituto della Enciclopedia Italiana.
- Braglia, Graziella Martinelli (2022). "Matilde di Canossa e gli antenati estensi nelle esequie di Carlotta Felicita di Brunswick-Lüneburg d'Este (1711)". MATILDICA (in Italian) (5): 103–112.
- Condren, John Patrick (2016). Louis XIV et le repos de l'Italie: French Policy towards the Duchies of Parma, Modena, and Mantua-Monferrato, 1659–1689 (Thesis). University of St Andrews. doi:10.17630/10023-8259.
- Condren, John (2024). Louis XIV and the Peace of Europe: French Diplomacy in Northern Italy, 1659 – 1701. Taylor & Francis. ISBN 978-0367691875.
- Frey, Linda; Frey, Marsha L., eds. (1995). The Treaties of the War of the Spanish Succession: An Historical and Critical Dictionary. Bloomsbury Academic. ISBN 9780313278846.
- Friedrich, Markus (2023). The Maker of Pedigrees: Jakob Wilhelm Imhoff and the Meanings of Genealogy in Early Modern Europe. Johns Hopkins University Press. ISBN 9781421445809.
- Hanlon, Gregory (2008). The Twilight Of A Military Tradition: Italian Aristocrats And European Conflicts, 1560-1800. Taylor & Francis. ISBN 9781135361426.
- Muratori, Lodovico Antonio (2010). Marri, Fabio; Lieber, Maria (eds.). La corrispondenza di Lodovico Antonio Muratori col mondo germanofono carteggi inediti (in Italian). Peter Lang. ISBN 9783631610626.
- Taddei, Elena (2024). "An Intercultural Royal Marriage and Experiences of Difference at the English Court: Mary of Modena (1658-1718) as a Carrier of Culture and Political Influencer". In Grüne, Niels; Ehrenpreis, Stefan (eds.). The British and German Worlds in an Age of Divergence. Taylor & Francis. pp. 227–247. ISBN 9781040104576.
- Williamson, David (1977). Montgomery-Massingberd, Hugh (ed.). Burke's Royal Families of the World: Europe & Latin America. Vol. I: Europe & Latin America. Burke's Peerage Ltd. ISBN 0 85011 023 8.

Rinaldo d'Este (1655–1737) House of Este Born: 26 April 1655 Died: 26 October 1737
Regnal titles
Preceded by Francesco II	Duke of Modena and Reggio; 1695–1737	Succeeded by Francesco III
