= San Vincenzo, Modena =

Roman Catholic church in Modena, Italy

Church of St Vincent; Chiesa di San Vicenzo (Italian)
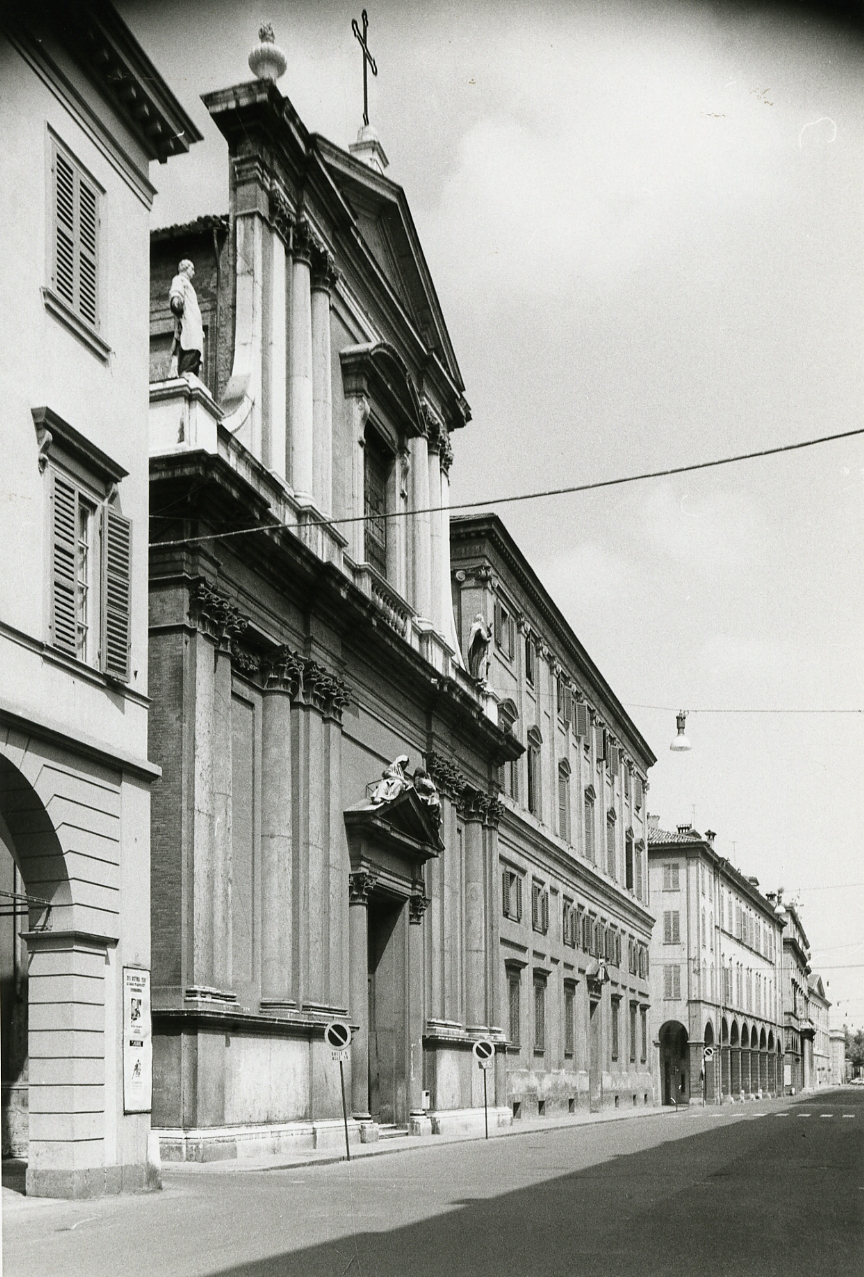
- Photo by Paolo Monti, 1973

Religion
- Affiliation: Catholic

Location
- Location: Modena, Italy
- Interactive map of: Church of St Vincent; Chiesa di San Vicenzo (Italian)
- Coordinates: 44°38′44.48″N 10°55′45.7″E

Architecture
- Architect: Bartolomeo Avanzini
- Style: Baroque
- Groundbreaking: after 1634
- Completed: 1761

The church of San Vincenzo is a Baroque style, Roman Catholic church located on Corso Canalgrande, number 75 in Modena, Italy.

== History ==
Built on the site of a prior 13th century church, the Theatine order tore down the structure to build a new church.

The layout of the church resembles that of other Theatine churches such as Sant'Andrea della Valle in Rome. With a long nave and a number of side chapels. The architect, sometime after 1634, was Bartolomeo Avanzini. The interior stucco was mainly the work of Avanzini, who was also active in similar decoration at the Ducal Palace of Sassuolo.

On May 13, 1944, a bomb destroyed the presbytery and choir, destroying the apse and cupola frescoes (1671) by Sigismondo Caula. The apse, now bare, had a Glory of St Vincent. The main altar, restored after the bombing, was carved by Tommaso Loraghi. A funeral chapel for the House of Austria-Este was built in 1836 by Francis IV, Duke of Modena using designs by Francesco Vandelli. The first chapel on the left has an altarpiece of St Gregory reading by Guercino.
