= Ducal Palace of Modena =

Baroque palace in Modena, Italy

- Palazzo ducale di Modena
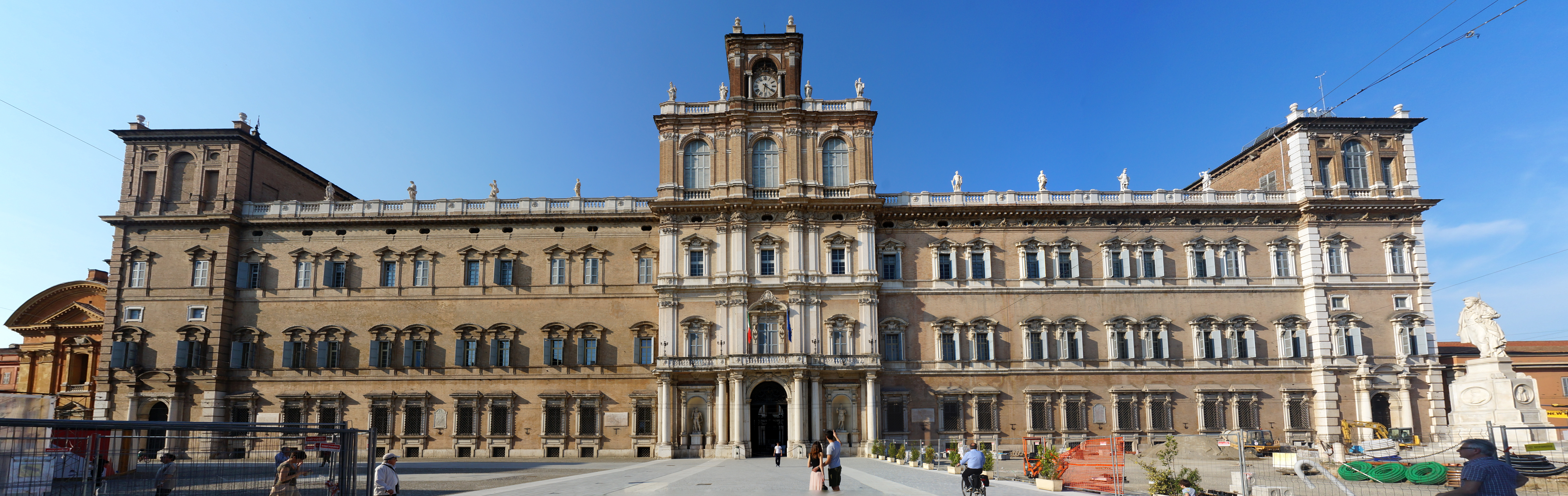
- The Ducal Palace of Modena.
- Interactive map of the Ducal Palace of Modena area

General information
- Type: Palace
- Architectural style: Italian Baroque
- Location: Modena, Italy
- Coordinates: 44.6484°N 10.9294°E
- Current tenants: Italian Military Academy
- Construction started: 1634
- Client: Francesco I d'Este
- Owner: Este

Technical details
- Floor count: 3

Design and construction
- Architects: Gaspare Vigarani, Bartolomeo Avanzini

The Ducal Palace of Modena is a Baroque palace in Modena, Italy. It was the residence of the Este Dukes of Modena between 1452 and 1859. It currently houses a portion of the Italian Military Academy.

== History ==
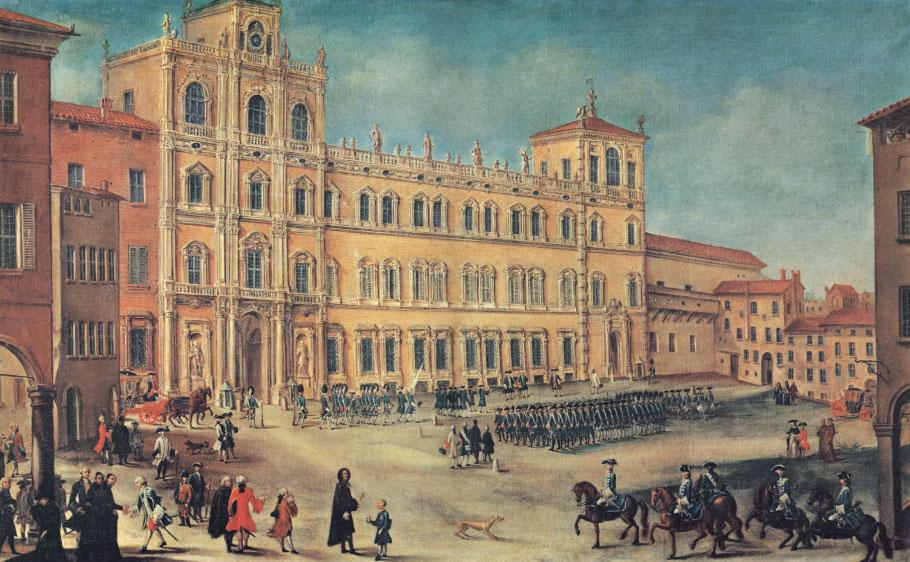
Ducal Palace of Modena, 18th century, unknown artist

The palace occupies the site of the former Este Castle, once at the periphery of the city. Although generally credited to Bartolomeo Avanzini, it has been suggested that advice and guidance in the design process had been sought from Pietro da Cortona, Gian Lorenzo Bernini and Francesco Borromini.

The Palace has a Baroque façade, from which the Honour Court and the Honour Staircase can be accessed.

In 1696, Marcantonio Franceschini was commissioned to create a frescoed ceiling for the central Sala d'Onore ("Hall of Honour") for the marriage of Rinaldo d'Este to Princess Charlotte Felicity of Brunswick. The Salottino d'Oro ("Golden Sitting Room"), covered with gilded removable panels, was used by Duke Francis III as his main office.

== Modern use ==
The Palace currently houses the Italian Military Academy, the Military Museum and a library.

Military ceremonies are held in the Honour Court.

== Este births and deaths ==
Being a residential palace, a significant number of Este family members were born or died at the palace including:

- Isabella d'Este (1635–1666) - born at the palace.
- Rinaldo d'Este, Duke of Modena (1655–1737) - born and died at the palace.
- Mary of Modena (1658–1718) aka Maria Beatrice Eleonora d'Este, Queen of England, Scotland and Ireland--born at the palace
- Duchess Charlotte of Brunswick-Lüneburg (1671–1710) - died at the palace in childbirth (the child also died).
- Maria Teresa Felicitas d'Este (1726–1754) - born at the palace.
- Ercole III d'Este, Duke of Modena (1727–1803) - born at the palace.
- Maria Fortunata d'Este (1731–1803)

== See also ==
- List of Baroque residences
- Modena
- House of Este
- Santo Peranda - painted The defeat of the Saracens for the palace.

== Gallery ==
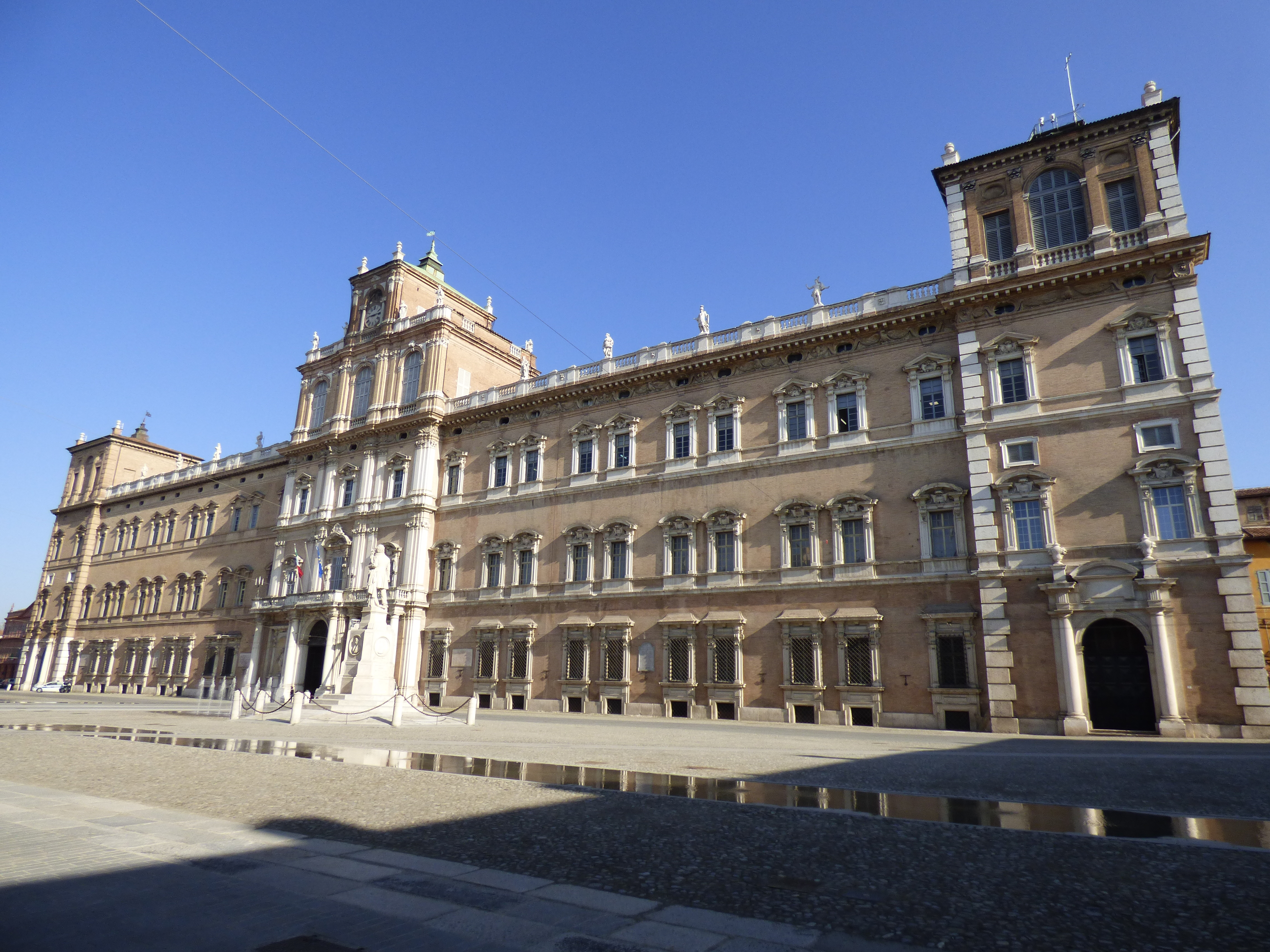

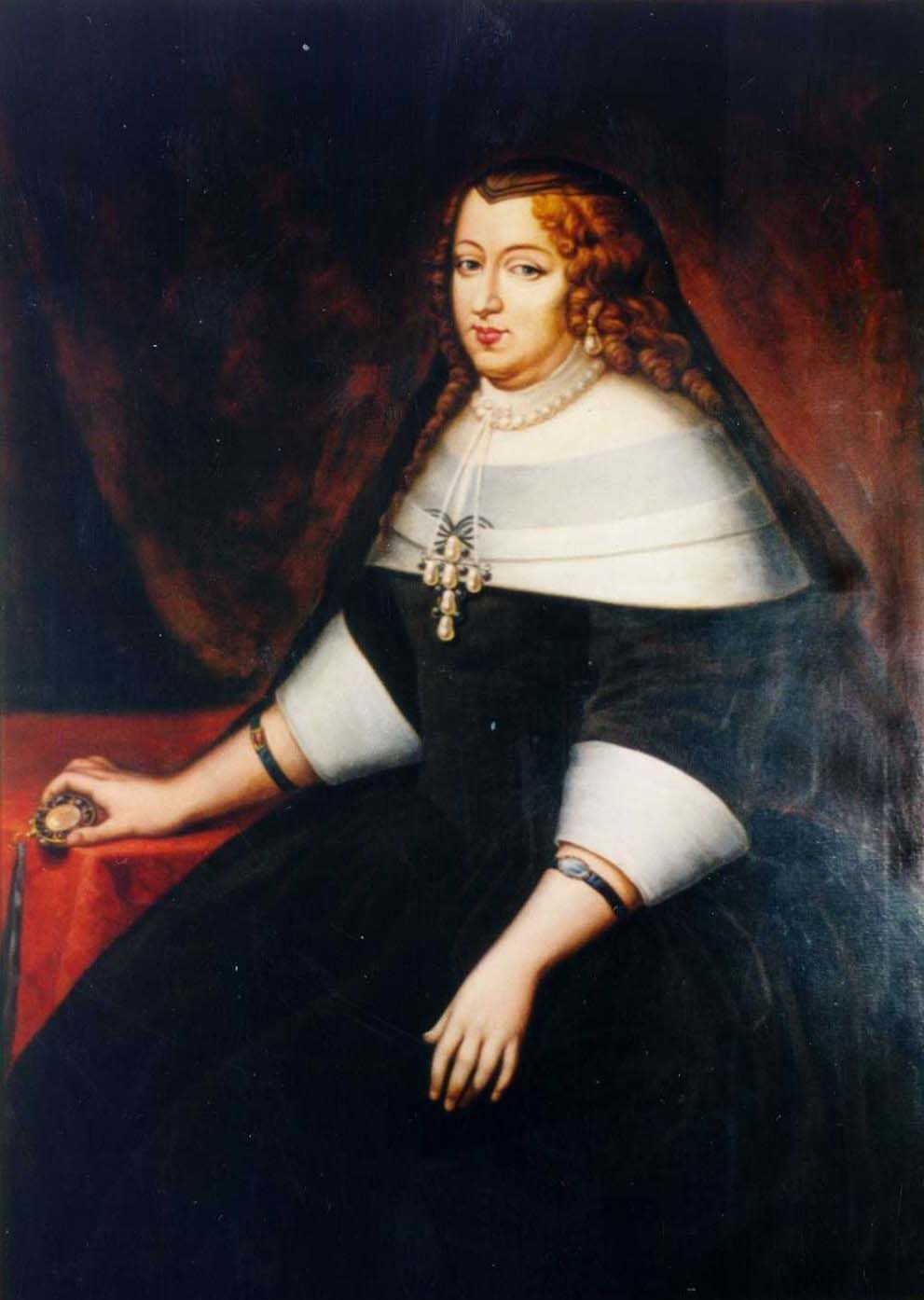
Portrait of Marie Jeanne of Savoy as a widow held at the Ducal Palace of Modena, unknown Artist, c.1680

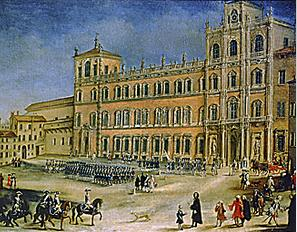
Ducal Palace of Modena, 18th century, unknown artist

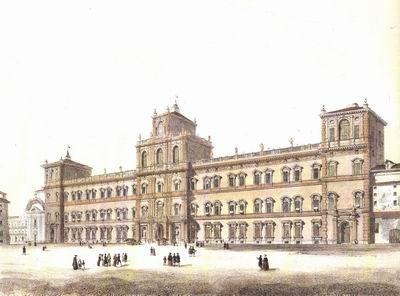
Ducal Palace of Modena, c.1750, unknown artist
