= Francesco II d'Este =

Duke of Modena from 1662 to 1694

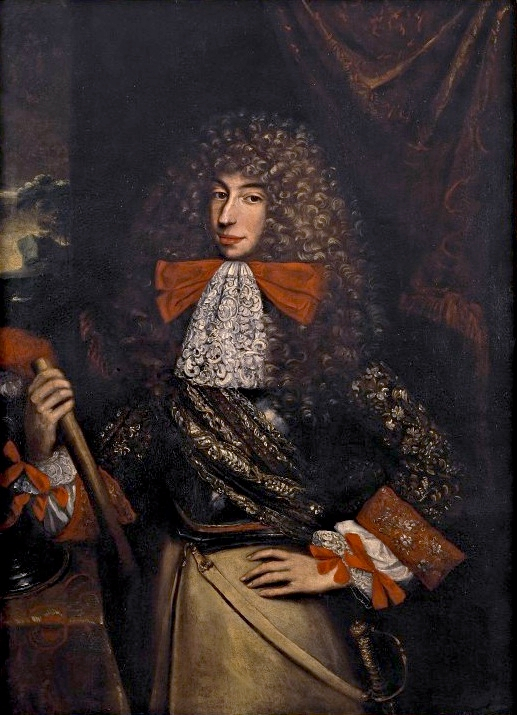
- Portrait, c. 1670s–1680s

Duke of Modena and Reggio
- Reign: 16 July 1662 – 6 September 1694
- Predecessor: Alfonso IV d'Este
- Successor: Rinaldo d'Este
- Regent: Laura Martinozzi (1662–1674)
- Born: 6 March 1660
- Died: 6 September 1694 (aged 34)
- Spouse: Margherita Maria Farnese (m. 1692)
- House: Este
- Father: Alfonso IV d'Este
- Mother: Laura Martinozzi
- Religion: Roman Catholicism

Francesco II d'Este (6 March 1660 – 6 September 1694) was Duke of Modena and Reggio from 1662 to 1694.

== Biography ==
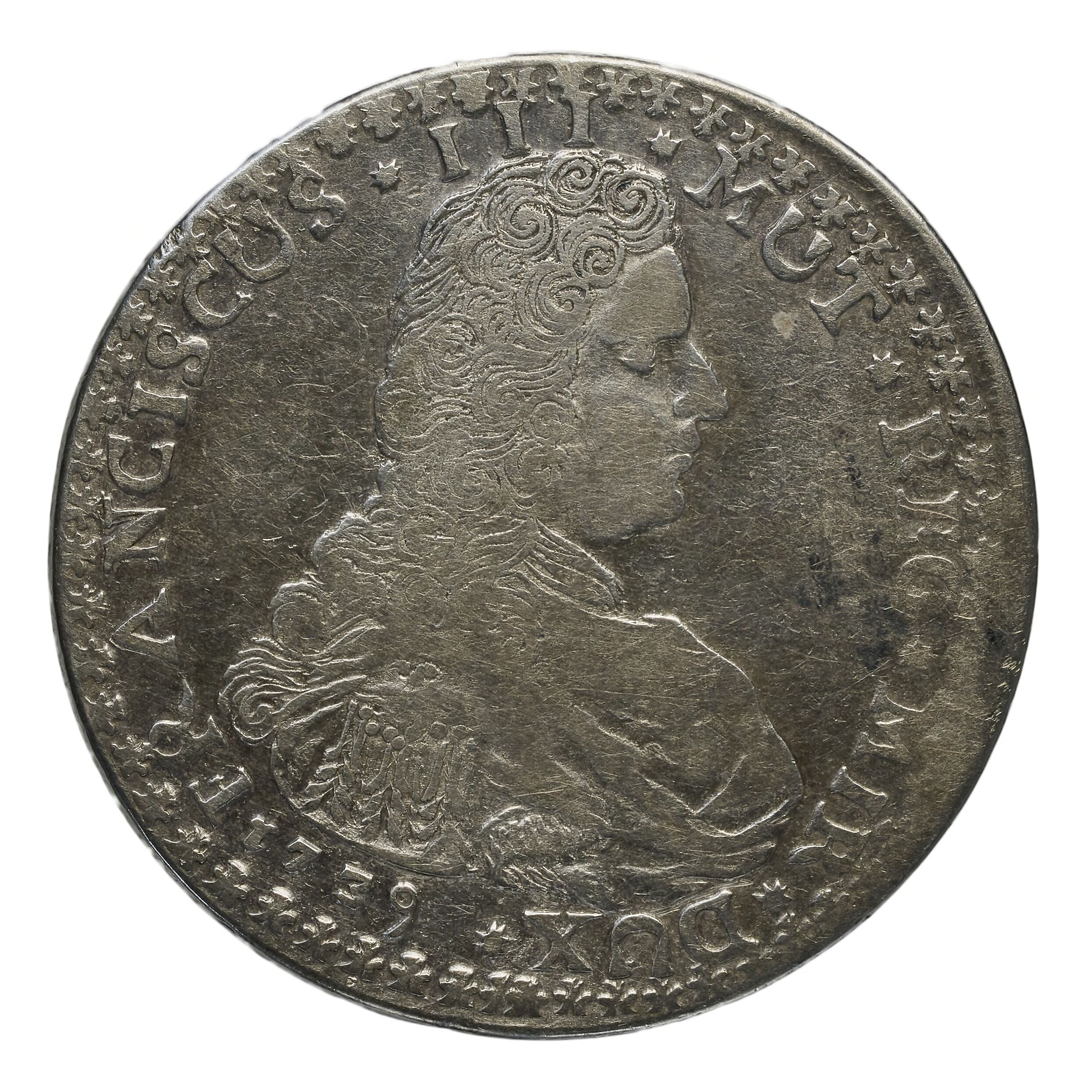
Écu of Francesco II d'Este

He was born in Modena to Alfonso IV d'Este, duke of Modena, and Laura Martinozzi, niece of Cardinal Mazarin. His sister, Mary of Modena, married the future James II of England in 1673 and became queen of England in 1685. Their child, and therefore Francesco's nephew, was James, the Old Pretender who struggled to regain the throne of England during the 1715 Jacobite rebellion.

He became duke at the age of two. His mother, pious and rigorous, served as his regent until 1674, filling state offices with clerics under the advice of her Jesuit confessor Father Garimberti. When she left to accompany the princess to England, Francesco assumed control at the age of fourteen. His character changed dramatically in the free and easy company of his cousin, principe Cesare Ignazio d'Este, and after her return the dowager duchess withdrew from court.

Francesco's foreign policy was affected by the requirements of Louis XIV, his sister's patron after 1688, but he resisted French attempts to interfere in the duchies. A Franco Modenese alliance was proposed with Francesco and a princess of the House of Lorraine, Béatrice Hiéronyme, the eldest daughter of François Marie, Prince of Lillebonne. The marriage never materialised and instead, he married Margherita Maria Farnese.

The couple had no children and when Francesco died heirless in 1694 after just two years of marriage, he was succeeded by his half-uncle Cardinal Rinaldo d'Este, who renounced his ecclesiastical career and cardinalate for this purpose.

He learned the violin as a boy and the court orchestra was revived for him when he was eleven; one of the musicians employed there was Giovanni Maria Bononcini. Francesco was a lavish and discerning patron of music, and the composer Arcangelo Corelli dedicated his Op. 3 trio sonatas (Rome, 1689) to him. His library has remained substantially complete in the Biblioteca Estense, Modena.

== Ancestry ==
Ancestors of Francesco II d'Este

16. Cesare d'Este, Duke of Modena
8. Alfonso III d'Este, Duke of Modena
17. Virginia de' Medici
4. Francesco I d'Este, Duke of Modena
18. Charles Emmanuel I, Duke of Savoy
9. Isabella of Savoy
19. Catherine Michelle of Austria
2. Alfonso IV d'Este, Duke of Modena
20. Alessandro Farnese, Duke of Parma
10. Ranuccio I Farnese, Duke of Parma
21. Maria of Portugal
5. Maria Caterina Farnese
22. Giovanni Francesco Aldobrandini
11. Margherita Aldobrandini
23. Olimpia Aldobrandini
1. Francesco II d'Este
24. Giovanni Battista Martinozzi
12. Vincenzo Martinozzi
25. Bianca Lanci
6. Hieronymus Martinozzi
26. Matteo Marcolini
13. Margherita Marcolini
27. Tommosa Bertozzi
3. Laura Martinozzi
28. Girolamo Mazarini
14. Pietro Mazzarini
29. Margherita de Franchis Passavera
7. Laura Mazarini
30. Giulio Buffalini
15. Hortense Buffalini
31. Francesca Bellone

== Bibliography ==
- Crowther, Victor. "A Case-Study in the Power of the Purse: The Management of the Ducal 'Cappella' in Modena in the Reign of Francesco II d'Este", Journal of the Royal Musical Association, 115.2 (1990), pp. 207–219.
- Cont, Alessandro. "'Sono nato principe libero, tale voglio conservarmi': Francesco II d’Este (1660-1694)", Memorie Scientifiche, Giuridiche, Letterarie, Accademia Nazionale di Scienze Lettere e Arti di Modena, ser. 8, 12 (2009), 2, pp. 407–459.

Francesco II d'Este House of Este Born: 1660 Died: 1694
Regnal titles
Preceded by Alfonso IV	Duke of Modena and Reggio; 1662–1694	Succeeded by Rinaldo III
